= Pope Pius XII =

Head of the Catholic Church from 1939 to 1958

Venerable Pius XII
- Bishop of Rome
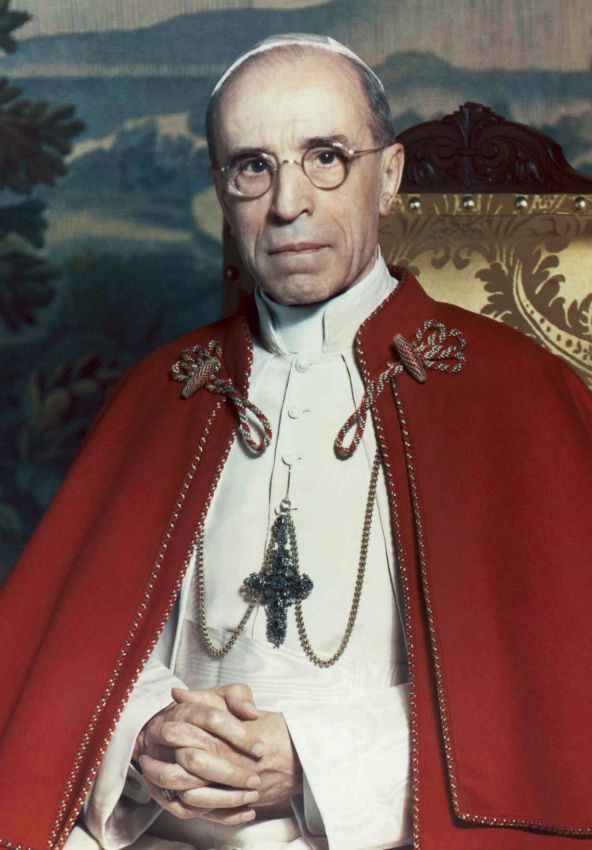
- Pius XII, c. 1951
- Church: Catholic Church
- Papacy began: 2 March 1939
- Papacy ended: 9 October 1958
- Predecessor: Pius XI
- Successor: John XXIII
Previous posts
Previous posts	Pro-Secretary of the Congregation for Extraordinary Ecclesiastical Affairs (1912‍–‍1914); Secretary of the Congregation for Extraordinary Ecclesiastical Affairs (1914‍–‍1917); Titular Archbishop of Sardes (1917‍–‍1929); Apostolic Nuncio to Bavaria (1917‍–‍1925); Apostolic Nuncio to Germany (1920‍–‍1930); Apostolic Nuncio to Prussia (1926‍–‍1929); Cardinal Priest of Santi Giovanni e Paolo al Celio (1929‍–‍1939); Prefect of the Congregation for Extraordinary Ecclesiastical Affairs (1930‍–‍1939); Cardinal Secretary of State (1930‍–‍1939); Archpriest of St. Peter's Basilica (1930‍–‍1939); Camerlengo of the Apostolic Chamber (1935‍–‍1939)

Orders
- Ordination: 2 April 1899 by Francesco di Paola Cassetta
- Consecration: 13 May 1917 by Benedict XV
- Created cardinal: 16 December 1929 by Pius XI
- Rank: Cardinal priest

Personal details
- Born: Eugenio Maria Giuseppe Giovanni Pacelli; 2 March 1876 Rome, Italy
- Died: 9 October 1958 (aged 82) Castel Gandolfo, Italy
- Education: Almo Collegio Capranica; Pontifical Gregorian University; Pontifical Roman Athenaeum Saint Apollinare; Sapienza University of Rome
- Motto: Opus justitiae pax (Latin for 'The work of justice [shall be] peace') (Note: Isaiah 32:17)
- Signature: Pius XII's signature

- Coat of arms: Pius XII's coat of arms

Ordination history
History
Priestly ordination
- Ordained by: Francesco di Paola Cassetta
- Date: 2 April 1899
Episcopal consecration
- Principal consecrator: Pope Benedict XV
- Co-consecrators: Agostino Zampini; Giovanni di Corneliano
- Date: 13 May 1917
- Place: St. Peter's Basilica, Rome
Cardinalate
- Elevated by: Pope Pius XI
- Date: 16 December 1929
Episcopal succession
Bishops consecrated by Pope Pius XII as principal consecrator
- Michel d'Herbigny: 29 March 1926
- Giuseppe Pizzardo: 27 April 1930
- Luigi Centoz: 14 February 1932
- Francis Spellman: 8 September 1932
- Albert Levame: 4 February 1934
- Saverio Ritter: 11 August 1935
- Maurilio Silvani: 13 September 1936
- Eugène Tisserant: 25 July 1937
- Francesco Cialeo: 29 October 1939
- Carlo Confalonieri: 4 May 1941
- Pope Pius XII's voice Message of Pope Pius XII at the opening of the Holy Year; Recorded 1949

Pope Pius XII (Italian: Pio XII; born Eugenio Maria Giuseppe Giovanni Pacelli; 2 March 1876 – 9 October 1958) was head of the Catholic Church and sovereign of the Vatican City from 2 March 1939 until his death in 1958. His pontificate spanned World War II, the Holocaust, and the first years of the Cold War. He is the most recent Pope to take the name Pius.

Born, raised, educated, ordained and resident for most of his life in Rome, prior to his papacy he was secretary of the Vatican's Department of Extraordinary Ecclesiastical Affairs, nuncio to Germany, Camerlengo of the Apostolic Chamber, and Cardinal Secretary of State for the Holy See, in which capacity he was entrusted with negotiating treaties with other sovereign states.

The Vatican was officially neutral during World War II. The Reichskonkordat — the treaty Pacelli had signed with Nazi Germany — and Pius' actions during the war remain the subject of debate, including accusations of public silence and inaction concerning the fate of the Jews. Pius' defenders state that he employed diplomacy to aid the victims of the Nazis and directed the Church to provide discreet aid to Jews and others, thereby saving thousands of lives; that the Nazis viewed him as an Allied sympathizer who had dishonored his policy of Vatican neutrality; and that Pius maintained links to the German resistance and shared intelligence with the Allies. His detractors state that he did not issue any widespread orders to hide or shield Jews, that Church rescue efforts depended instead on the initiatives of local clergy (including those in Vatican City and Rome) and nuncios; and that Pius's generalized public statements about genocide did not specifically mention Jewry and were considered inadequate by the Allies and Polish government-in-exile.

During his papacy, the Catholic Church issued the Decree against Communism, declaring that Catholics who profess the atheistic and materialist doctrines of communism are to be excommunicated as apostates from the Christian faith. He explicitly invoked ex cathedra papal infallibility with the dogma of the Assumption of Mary in his Apostolic constitution Munificentissimus Deus. His forty-one encyclicals include Mystici Corporis Christi, on the Church as the Mystical Body of Christ; Mediator Dei on liturgy reform; and Humani generis, in which he instructed theologians to adhere to episcopal teaching and allowed that the human body might have evolved from earlier forms. He removed, by international cardinal appointments, the Italian majority in the College of Cardinals in 1946.

After he died in 1958, Pius was succeeded by Pope John XXIII. Pius' beatification process was opened in 1965 by Pope Paul VI during the final session of the Second Vatican Council. Upon the opening of the beatification process in 1990, Pius was titled a Servant of God. Pope Benedict XVI declared Pius venerable in 2009.

== Early life ==
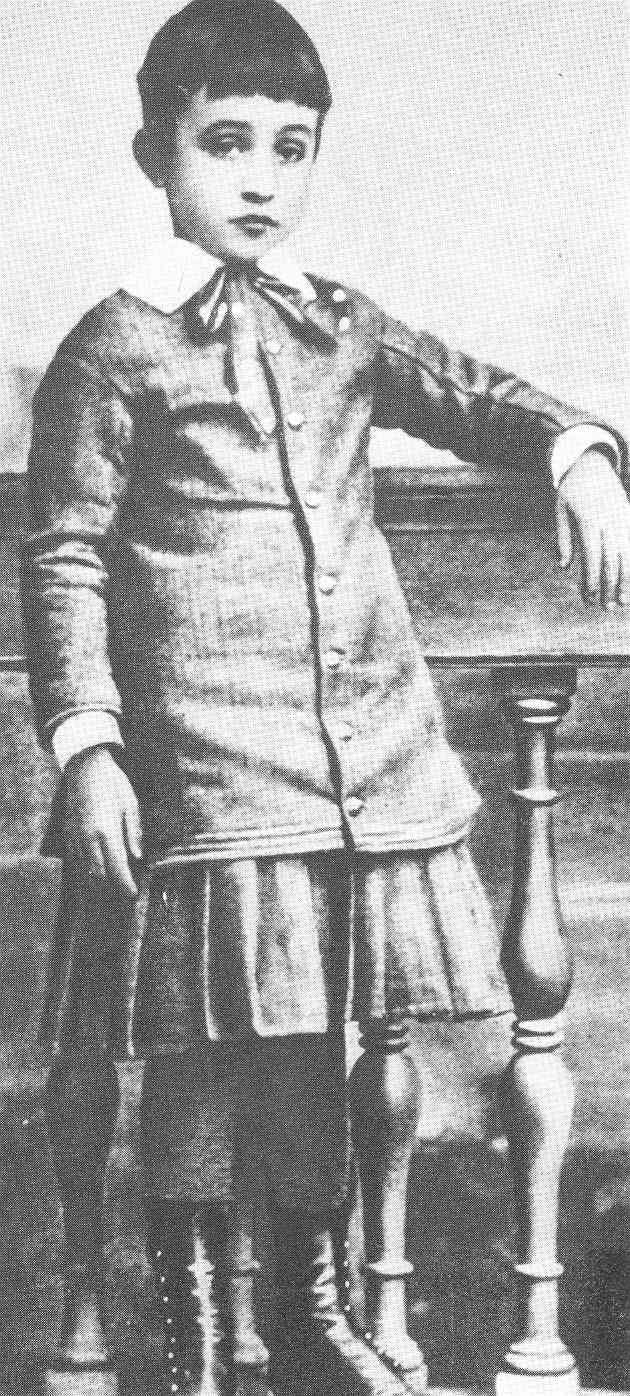
Eugenio Pacelli at the age of six in 1882

Eugenio Pacelli was born in Rome into an upper-class family with a history of ties to the papacy (the Black Nobility). His parents were Filippo (1837–1916) and Virginia (née Graziosi) (1844–1920) Pacelli. His grandfather Marcantonio Pacelli had been Undersecretary in the Papal Ministry of Finances and then Secretary of the Interior under Pope Pius IX from 1851 to 1870, and helped found the Vatican's newspaper, L'Osservatore Romano. His cousin, Ernesto Pacelli, was a key financial advisor to Pope Leo XIII, his father a Franciscan tertiary and dean of the Roman Rota. His brother, Francesco Pacelli (1872-1935), became a lay canon lawyer and the legal advisor to Pope Pius XI, in which role he negotiated the Lateran Treaty in 1929 with Benito Mussolini.

Together with his brother and two sisters, Giuseppina (1874–1955) and Elisabetta (1880–1970), Eugenio grew up in the Parione district in the centre of Rome. He began school at the convent of the French Sisters of Divine Providence and served as an altar boy at the church his family attended; in 1886, he was sent to the private school of Professor Giuseppe Marchi. In 1891, he entered the Ennio Quirino Visconti Liceo Ginnasio, a state school situated in what had been the Collegio Romano.

In 1894, aged 18, Pacelli began his theology studies at the Almo Collegio Capranica, and in November of that year registered to take philosophy at the Jesuit Pontifical Gregorian University and theology at the Pontifical Roman Athenaeum S. Apollinare. He also enrolled at the State University, La Sapienza where he studied modern languages and history. At the end of the first academic year, he dropped out of both the Capranica and the Gregorian University; according to his sister Elisabetta, the food at the Capranica was to blame. Having received a special dispensation, he continued his studies from home and so spent most of his seminary years as an external student. In 1899, he completed his education in Sacred Theology with a doctoral degree awarded on the basis of a short dissertation and an oral examination in Latin.

== Church career ==
=== Priest and monsignor ===
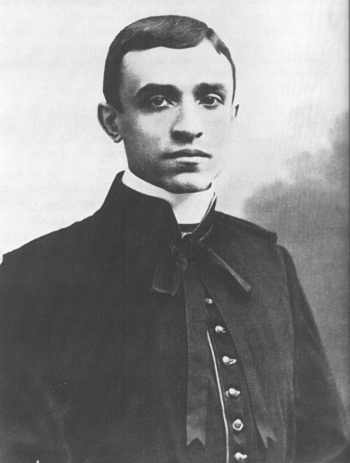
Pacelli on the day of his ordination: 2 April 1899

Pacelli was ordained in 1899 in the private chapel of a family friend, the Vicegerent of Rome. Shortly afterwards, he began postgraduate studies in canon law at Sant'Apollinaire. In 1901, he entered the Congregation for Extraordinary Ecclesiastical Affairs, a sub-office of the Vatican Secretariat of State.

Pietro Gasparri, the recently appointed Extraordinary Affairs undersecretary, proposed that Pacelli work in the "Vatican's equivalent of the Foreign office," highlighting the "necessity of defending the Church from the onslaughts of secularism and liberalism throughout Europe". As an apprendista (apprentice) in Gasparri's department, he was chosen to deliver the Vatican's condolences to Edward VII after the death of Queen Victoria in 1901.

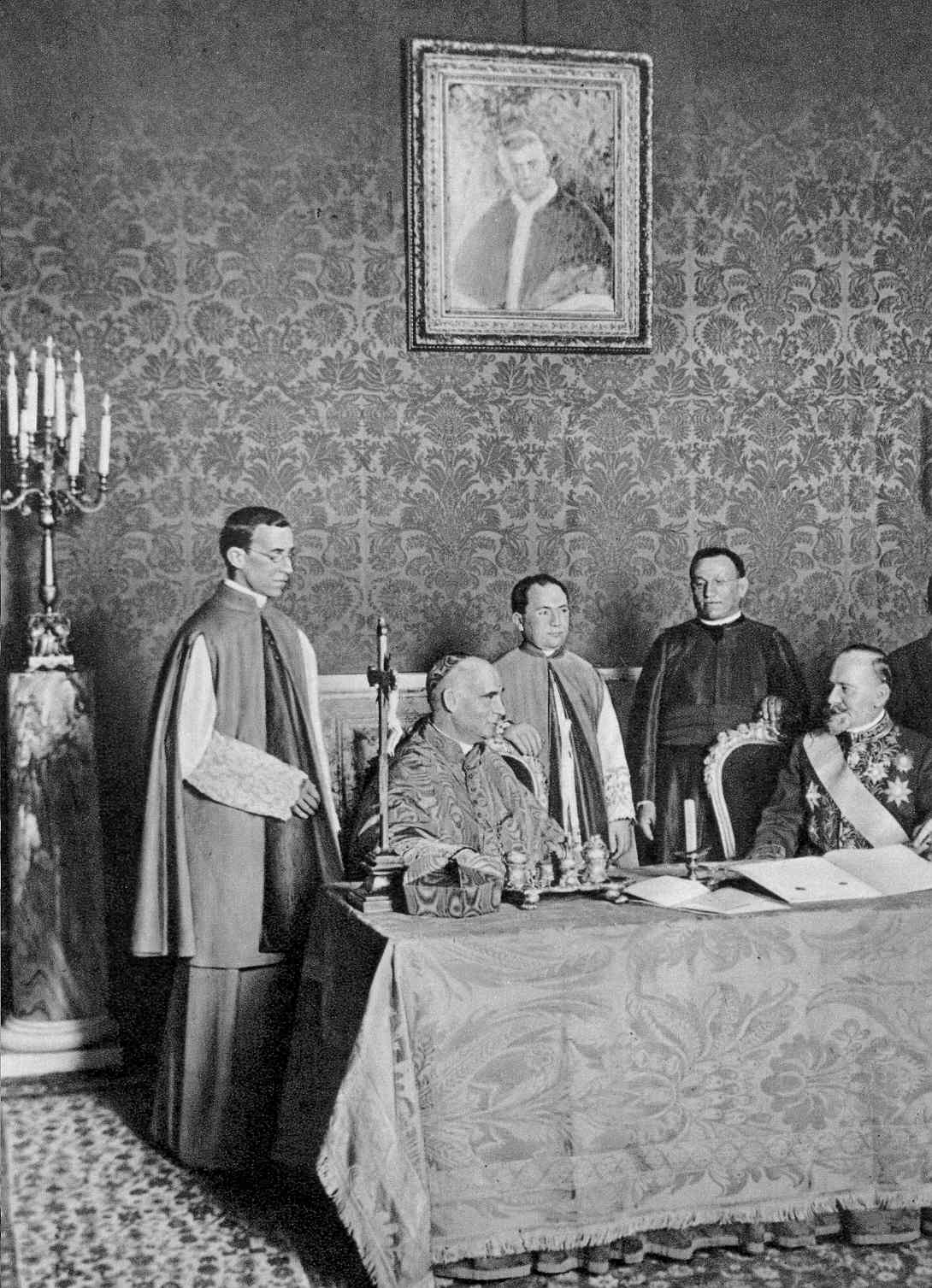
The Serbian Concordat, 24 June 1914. Present for the Vatican were Cardinal Merry del Val and next to him, Pacelli.

By 1904, Pacelli received his doctorate. The topic of his thesis was the nature of concordats and the function of canon law when a concordat falls into abeyance. Promoted to the position of minutante, he prepared digests of reports that had been sent to the Secretariat. In the same year, he became a papal chamberlain, and in 1905 was named domestic prelate. From 1904 until 1916, he assisted Gasparri in the Vatican's codification of canon law; which, according to John Cornwell, "together with the Anti-Modernist Oath, became the means by which the Holy See was to establish and sustain the new, unequal, and unprecedented power relationship that had arisen between the papacy and the Church".

In 1908, Pacelli served as a Vatican representative on the International Eucharistic Congress, accompanying Rafael Merry del Val to London, where he met Winston Churchill. In 1911, he represented the Holy See at the coronation of George V and Mary. Pacelli became undersecretary in 1911, adjunct secretary in 1912, and, in February 1914, secretary of the Department of Extraordinary Ecclesiastical Affairs. On 24 June, four days before Archduke Franz Ferdinand of Austria was assassinated, Pacelli, together with Merry del Val, represented the Vatican when the Serbian Concordat was signed. (Serbia's success in the First Balkan War against Turkey in 1912 had increased the number of Catholics within greater Serbia, at a time when Serbia, encouraged by Russia, was challenging Austria-Hungary's sphere of influence in the Balkans.) Pius X died in August 1914. His successor, Benedict XV, named Gasparri secretary of state, and Gasparri made Pacelli his undersecretary. During World War I, Pacelli maintained the Vatican's registry of prisoners of war and worked to implement papal relief initiatives. In 1915, he travelled to Vienna to assist Raffaele Scapinelli, nuncio to Vienna, in his negotiations with Franz Joseph I of Austria regarding Italy.

=== Archbishop and papal nuncio ===
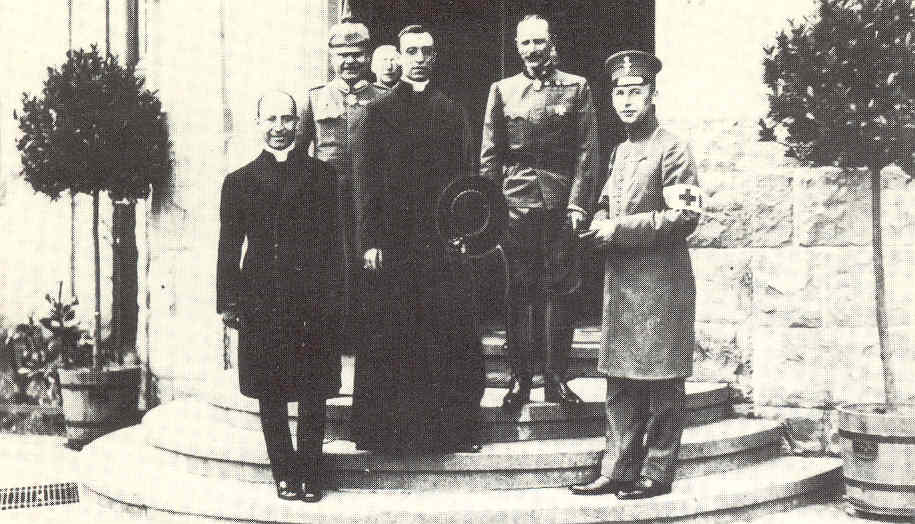
Pacelli at the Headquarters of Wilhelm II

Benedict appointed Pacelli nuncio to Bavaria on 23 April 1917, consecrating him as titular Archbishop of Sardis on 13 May, after which Pacelli left to take up his new post. As there was no nuncio to Prussia or Germany at the time, Pacelli was now for all practical purposes nuncio to the German Empire.

Once in Munich, he conveyed a papal initiative to end the war to German authorities. He met with King Ludwig III on 29 May, and later with Kaiser Wilhelm II and Chancellor Theobald von Bethmann Hollweg, who replied positively. However, Bethmann Hollweg was forced to resign, and the initiative lost any momentum it might have had.

For the remainder of the war, Pacelli concentrated on Benedict's humanitarian efforts, especially among prisoners of war in German custody. In the upheaval following the Armistice, a disconcerted Pacelli sought Benedict's permission to leave Munich, where Kurt Eisner had formed the Free State of Bavaria, and spent some time in a Swiss sanatorium run by nuns in Rorschach. Lorenzo Schioppa, the uditore ("auditor" or attaché), was left in Munich.

When he returned to Munich following Eisner's assassination, Pacelli wrote Gasparri — basing his remarks at least in part on Schioppa's account — about the scene at the former royal palace as the trio of Max Levien, Eugen Levine, and Tobias Akselrod sought power:

The scene that presented itself at the palace was indescribable. The confusion totally chaotic, the filth completely nauseating; soldiers and armed workers coming and going; the building, once the home of a king, resounding with screams, vile language, profanities. Absolute hell. An army of employees were dashing to and fro, giving out orders, waving bits of paper, and in the midst of all this, a gang of young women, of dubious appearance, Jews like all the rest of them, hanging around in all the offices with lecherous demeanor and suggestive smiles. The boss of this female rabble was Levien's mistress, a young Russian woman, a Jew and a divorcée, who was in charge. And it was to her that the nunciature was obliged to pay homage in order to proceed. This Levien is a young man, of about 30 or 35, also Russian and a Jew. Pale, dirty, with drugged eyes, hoarse voice, vulgar, repulsive, with a face that is both intelligent and sly. He deigned to receive the monsignor uditore in the corridor, surrounded by an armed escort, one of whom was an armed hunchback, his faithful bodyguard. With a hat on his head and smoking a cigarette, he listened to what Monsignor Schioppa told him, whining repeatedly that he was in a hurry and had more important things to do.

Cornwell comments that a worrying impression of antisemitism is discernible in the "catalogue of epithets describing... physical and moral repulsiveness," and that "Pacelli's constant harping on the Jewishness of this party of power usurpers is consistent with the growing and widespread belief among Germans that the Jews were the instigators of the Bolshevik revolution, their principal aim being the destruction of Christian civilization." Pacelli also described Munich to Gasparri as "suffering under a harsh Jewish-Russian revolutionary tyranny."

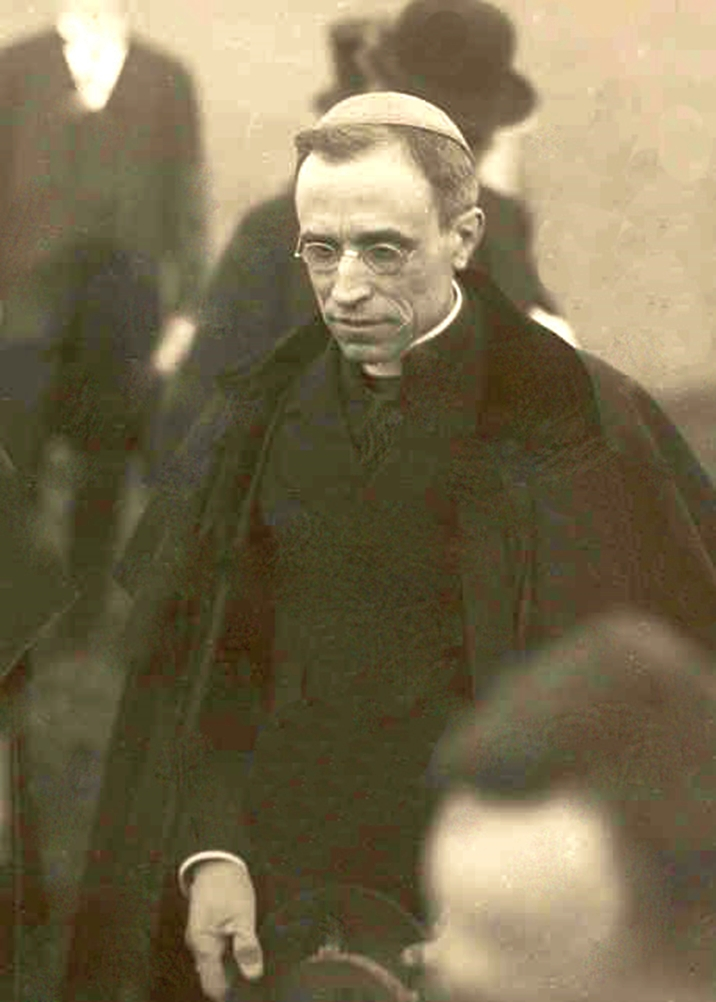
Pacelli in Bavaria, 1922

According to his housekeeper Pascalina Lehnert, Pacelli was repeatedly threatened by emissaries of the Bavarian Soviet Republic, who at one point tried to confiscate the nunciature car at gunpoint. Despite all this, Pacelli refused to leave his post. Some of Pacelli's Munich staff stayed with him the rest of his life, including his advisor Robert Leiber and Lehnert, who became a confidante.

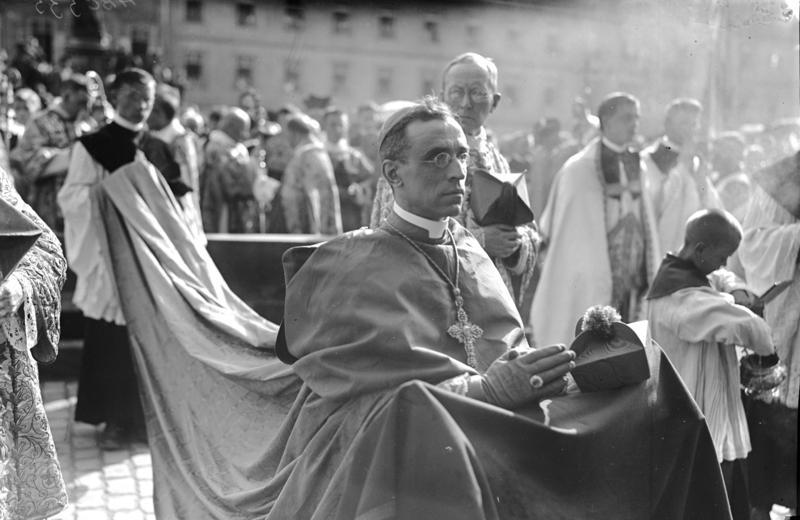
Nuncio Pacelli in July 1924 at the 900th anniversary of the City of Bamberg

Pacelli was appointed nuncio to Germany in 1920, and – after the completion of a Bavarian Concordat (1924) – his nunciature was moved to Berlin, where he lived in the Tiergarten and threw parties for the official and diplomatic elite. Paul von Hindenburg, Gustav Stresemann and other members of the Cabinet were regular guests. He developed a close working relationship with the German priest Ludwig Kaas, who was known for his expertise in Church-state relations and was a full-time politician, active in the Catholic Centre Party, which he'd led since 1928. Pacelli travelled widely within Germany, attended Katholikentag gatherings, and delivered some 50 sermons and speeches.

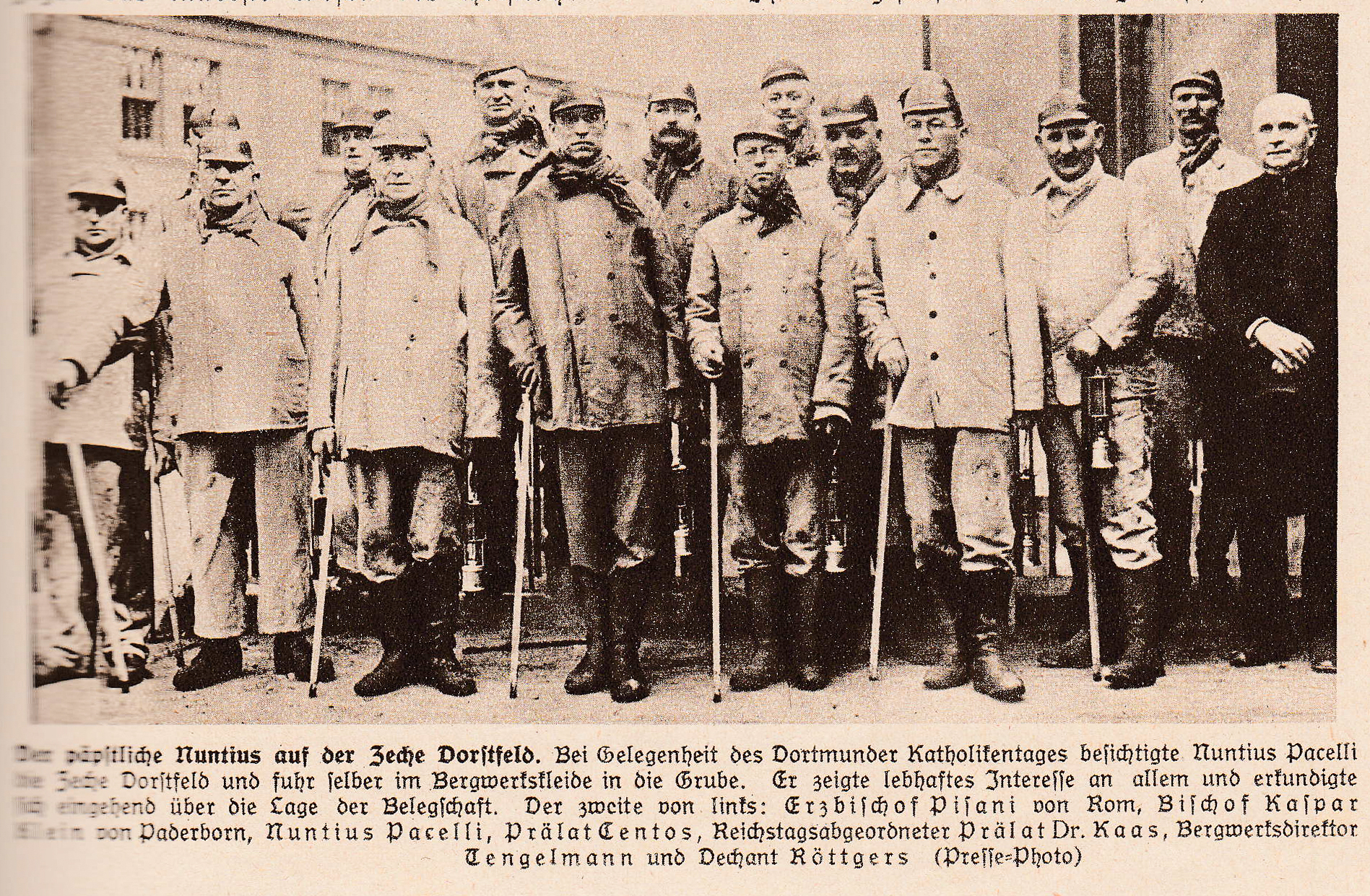
Nuncio Pacelli visits the coal mine Dorstfeld on the occasion of the Katholikentag in Dortmund, Germany, in 1927.

In the absence of a nuncio in Moscow, Pacelli worked on diplomatic arrangements between the Vatican and the Soviet Union, where the Catholic Church was persecuted. He negotiated food shipments for Russia and met with Soviet representatives including Foreign Minister Georgi Chicherin, who rejected any kind of religious education, the ordination of priests and bishops, and offered agreements without the points vital to the Vatican. Despite Vatican pessimism and a lack of visible progress, Pacelli continued secret negotiations until Pius XI ordered them discontinued in 1927.

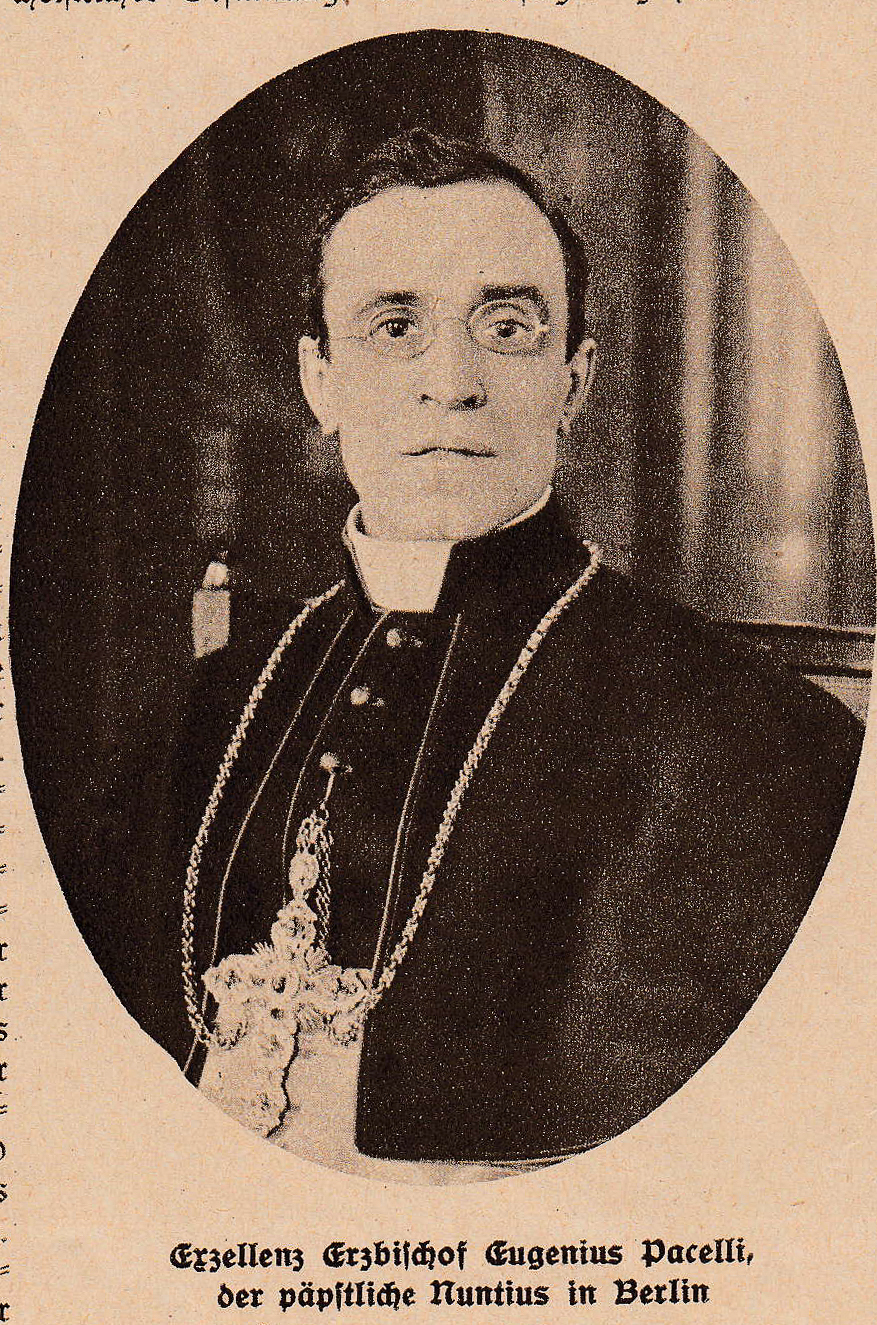
Eugenio Pacelli in 1927

Pacelli supported German diplomatic activity aimed at rejection of punitive measures by the victorious Allies. He blocked French attempts at an ecclesiastical separation of the Saar region, supported the appointment of a papal administrator for Danzig and aided the reintegration of German priests expelled from Poland. A Prussian Concordat was signed in June 1929. Following the Wall Street crash of 1929, a world economic slump began and the days of the Weimar Republic were numbered. Pacelli was summoned back to Rome at this time and left Berlin in December 1929. David G. Dalin, in The Pius War: Responses to the Critics of Pius XII (a book with an "Annotated Bibliography" but no inline citations or endnotes), wrote, "Of the forty-four speeches Pacelli gave in Germany as papal nuncio between 1917 and 1929, forty denounced some aspect of the emerging Nazi ideology". In 1935 Pius wrote a letter to Karl Joseph Schulte, the archbishop of Cologne, describing the Nazis as "false prophets with the pride of Lucifer" and "bearers of a new faith and a new Evangile" who were attempting to create "a mendacious antimony between faithfulness to the Church and the Fatherland".

=== Cardinal Secretary of State and Camerlengo ===
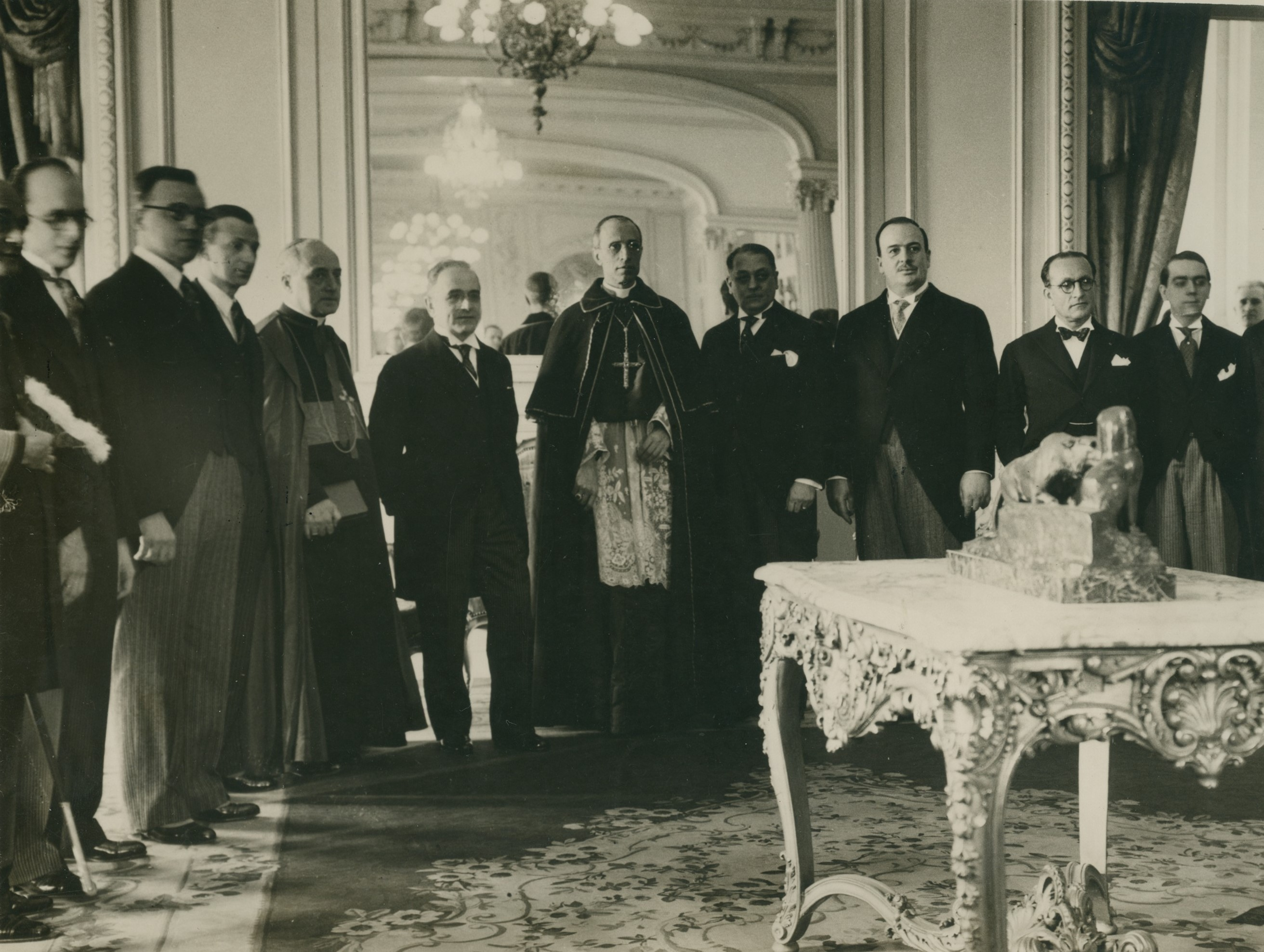
Cardinal Secretary of State Pacelli with Brazilian president Getúlio Vargas (at Pacelli's right shoulder) and other dignitaries in Rio de Janeiro, 1934

Pacelli was named Cardinal-Priest of Santi Giovanni e Paolo al Celio in December 1929, and in February 1930, was promoted to Cardinal Secretary of State, responsible for foreign policy and state relations. In 1935, he was named Camerlengo of the Holy Roman Church.

As Secretary of State, Pacelli signed a number of concordats (treaties between the Vatican and sovereign states), which authorized the Church to organize youth groups, make ecclesiastical appointments, run schools, hospitals and charities, and conduct religious services. They also ensured that canon law would be recognized within some spheres, e.g., church decrees of nullity in the area of marriage. Immediately on Pacelli's becoming Secretary of State, he and Kaas took up negotiations on a Baden Concordat. Papal fiat appointed Conrad Gröber, a supporter of Pacelli and his concordat policy, the new Archbishop of Freiburg, and the treaty was signed in August 1932. Others followed: Austria (1933), Germany (1933), Yugoslavia (1935) and Portugal (1940). As part of the Lateran treaties with Italy (concluded in 1929, before Pacelli became Secretary of State), Catholicism had become the sole recognized religion in Italy; the powerful democratic Italian Catholic Popular Party, in many ways similar to the Centre Party in Germany, had been disbanded; and in place of political Catholicism the Holy See encouraged Catholic Action, a movement which was permitted only so long as it developed "its activity outside every political party and in direct dependence upon the Church hierarchy for the dissemination and implementation of Catholic principles".

As the decade began Pacelli wanted the Centre Party in Germany to turn away from the socialists. In 1931, he clashed with Catholic chancellor Heinrich Brüning, who frankly told Pacelli he believed that he "misunderstood the political situation in Germany and the real character of the Nazis". Following Brüning's resignation in May 1932, Pacelli, like the new Catholic chancellor Franz von Papen, wondered if the Centre Party should look to the Right for a coalition "that would correspond to their principles". He made diplomatic visits throughout Europe and the Americas, including a two-week trip to the United States in 1936 where he met President Roosevelt, who appointed a personal envoy—who did not require Senate confirmation—to the Holy See in December 1939, re-establishing a diplomatic tradition that had been broken in 1870 when popes lost temporal power.

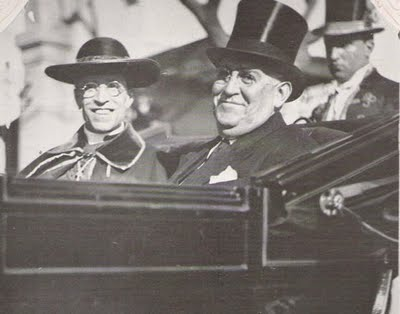
A smiling Pacelli with Argentine president Agustín P. Justo

Pacelli presided as Papal Legate over the International Eucharistic Congress in Buenos Aires, Argentina in October 1934, and in Budapest in May 1938. At this time, while antisemitic laws were in the process of being formulated in Hungary, Pacelli made reference to the Jews "whose lips curse [Christ] and whose hearts reject him even today". According to Joseph Bottum, Pacelli in 1937 "warned A. W. Klieforth, that Hitler was 'an untrustworthy scoundrel and fundamentally wicked person', to quote Klieforth, who also wrote that Pacelli 'did not believe Hitler capable of moderation, and... fully supported the German bishops in their anti-Nazi stand'. This was matched with the discovery of Pacelli's anti-Nazi report, written the following year for President Roosevelt and filed with Ambassador Joseph P. Kennedy Sr., which declared that the church regarded compromise with the Third Reich as 'out of the question'."

Historian Walter Bussmann stated that in November 1938, Pacelli dissuaded Pius XI – who was nearing death at the time – from condemning the Kristallnacht.

The draft encyclical Humani generis unitas ("On the Unity of the Human Race") was ready in September 1938 but, according to those responsible for an edition of the document and other sources, it was not forwarded to the Holy See by the Jesuit General Wlodimir Ledóchowski. On 28 January 1939, eleven days before the death of Pius XI, a disappointed Gundlach informed LaFarge, the encyclical's author, "It cannot go on like this". The text had not been forwarded to the Vatican. He had talked to the American assistant to Father General, who promised to look into the matter in December 1938, but did not report back. The draft encyclical contained an open and clear condemnation of colonialism, racial persecution and antisemitism. Historians Passelecq and Suchecky have argued that Pacelli learned about the existence of the draft only after the death of Pius XI and chose not to promulgate it as Pope. He did use parts of it in his inaugural encyclical Summi Pontificatus, which he titled "On the Unity of Human Society".

=== Reichskonkordat and Mit brennender Sorge ===
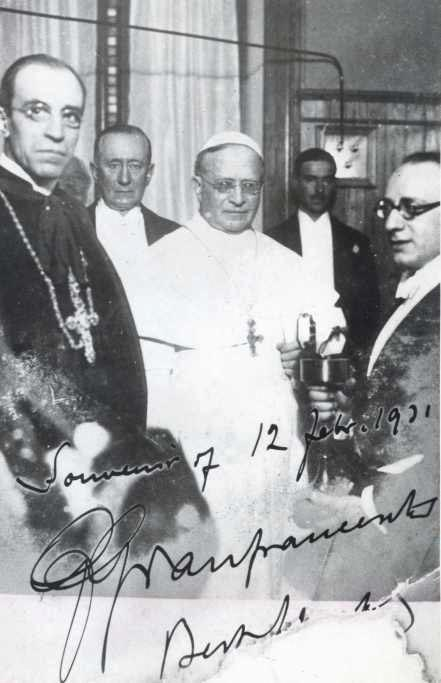
Pius XI (center) with Cardinal Pacelli (front left), the radio transmission pioneer Guglielmo Marconi (back left) and others at the inauguration of Vatican Radio on 12 February 1931

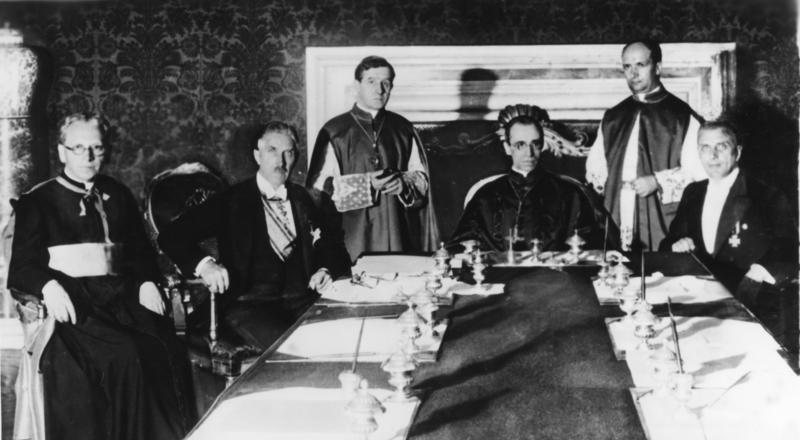
Pacelli (seated, center) at the signing of the Reichskonkordat on 20 July 1933 in Rome with (from left to right): German prelate Ludwig Kaas, German Vice-Chancellor Franz von Papen, Secretary of Extraordinary Ecclesiastical Affairs Giuseppe Pizzardo, Alfredo Ottaviani, and Reich minister Rudolf Buttmann

The Reichskonkordat was one of four concordats Pacelli concluded on behalf of the Vatican with German States. The federalist Weimar constitution had given the German states authority in the areas of education and culture and thus diminished the authority of the churches in these areas; this diminution of church authority was a primary concern of the Vatican. As Bavarian nuncio, Pacelli had negotiated successfully with the Bavarian authorities in 1924, and he expected the concordat with Catholic Bavaria to be the model for the rest of Germany. Prussia showed interest in negotiations only after the Bavarian concordat. However, Pacelli obtained less favorable conditions for the church in the Prussian Concordat of 1929, which excluded educational issues. A concordat with the German state of Baden was completed by Pacelli in 1932, after he had moved to Rome. A total of 16 concordats and treaties with European states were concluded between 1922 and 1932.

The Reichskonkordat between Germany and the Holy See was controversial from its beginning. It remains the most important of Pacelli's concordats. One of his main objectives as Secretary of State was a national concordat with Germany, where he hoped to strengthen the legal position of the Church and the Vatican. Pacelli, who knew Germany well, emphasized in particular protection for Catholic associations (§31), freedom for education and Catholic schools, and freedom for publications.

As nuncio during the 1920s, he had made unsuccessful attempts to obtain German agreement for such a treaty, and between 1930 and 1933 he attempted to initiate negotiations with representatives of successive German governments, but the opposition of Protestant and Socialist parties, the instability of national governments and the care of the individual states to guard their autonomy, thwarted him. In particular, the questions of denominational schools and pastoral work in the armed forces prevented any agreement on the national level, despite talks in the winter of 1932.

Adolf Hitler was appointed Chancellor on 30 January 1933 and sought to gain international respectability and to remove internal opposition by representatives of the Church and the Catholic Centre Party. He sent his vice chancellor Franz von Papen, a Catholic nobleman, to Rome for negotiations about a Reichskonkordat. On behalf of Pacelli, Kaas negotiated first drafts of the terms with Papen. The concordat was signed, by Pacelli for the Vatican and Papen for Germany, on 20 July and ratified on 10 September 1933. Hitler commented, "The concordat gives Germany an opportunity and creates an area of trust that is particularly significant in the developing struggle against international Jewry."

In a 1935 entry in his celebrated diary, German diplomat Harry Kessler, after extended discussion with Brüning, wrote about the Reichskonkordat:

The arrangement with Hitler should not be ascribed to the Pope [i.e., Pius XI], but to the Vatican bureaucracy and its policy-maker, Pacelli. What he has in mind is a perpetual alliance between an authoritarian secular state and an authoritarian Church ruled by the Vatican bureaucracy. This is why Catholic parliamentary parties, like the Centre Party in Germany, are a source of inconvenience to Pacelli and his friends and will be dropped by them without regret. The Pope does not share these views....

Bishop Konrad von Preysing had cautioned against compromise with the Nazi regime, against viewing any persecution of the church as an aberration Hitler would correct, and as it turned out, Pacelli issued 55 protests of violations of the Reichskonkordat between 1933 and 1939. Early in 1937, he asked several German cardinals, including Cardinal Michael von Faulhaber, to help him write a protest of Nazi violations of the concordat; this was to become Pius XI's 1937 encyclical, Mit brennender Sorge (in English "With deep [lit. 'burning'] anxiety"). The encyclical was written in German and not the usual Latin of official Catholic Church documents. Secretly distributed by an army of motorcyclists and read from every German Catholic Church pulpit on Palm Sunday, it condemned the paganism of the Nazi ideology. Pius XI credited its creation and writing to Pacelli. It resulted in persecution of the church by the infuriated Nazis who closed all the participating presses and "took numerous vindictive measures against the Church, including staging a long series of immorality trials of the Catholic clergy". On 10 June 1941, Pacelli (now pope) commented on the problems of the Reichskonkordat in a letter to the Bishop of Passau: "The history of the Reichskonkordat shows, that the other side lacked the most basic prerequisites to accept minimal freedoms and rights of the Church, without which the Church simply cannot live and operate, formal agreements notwithstanding".

== Papacy ==
=== Election and coronation ===
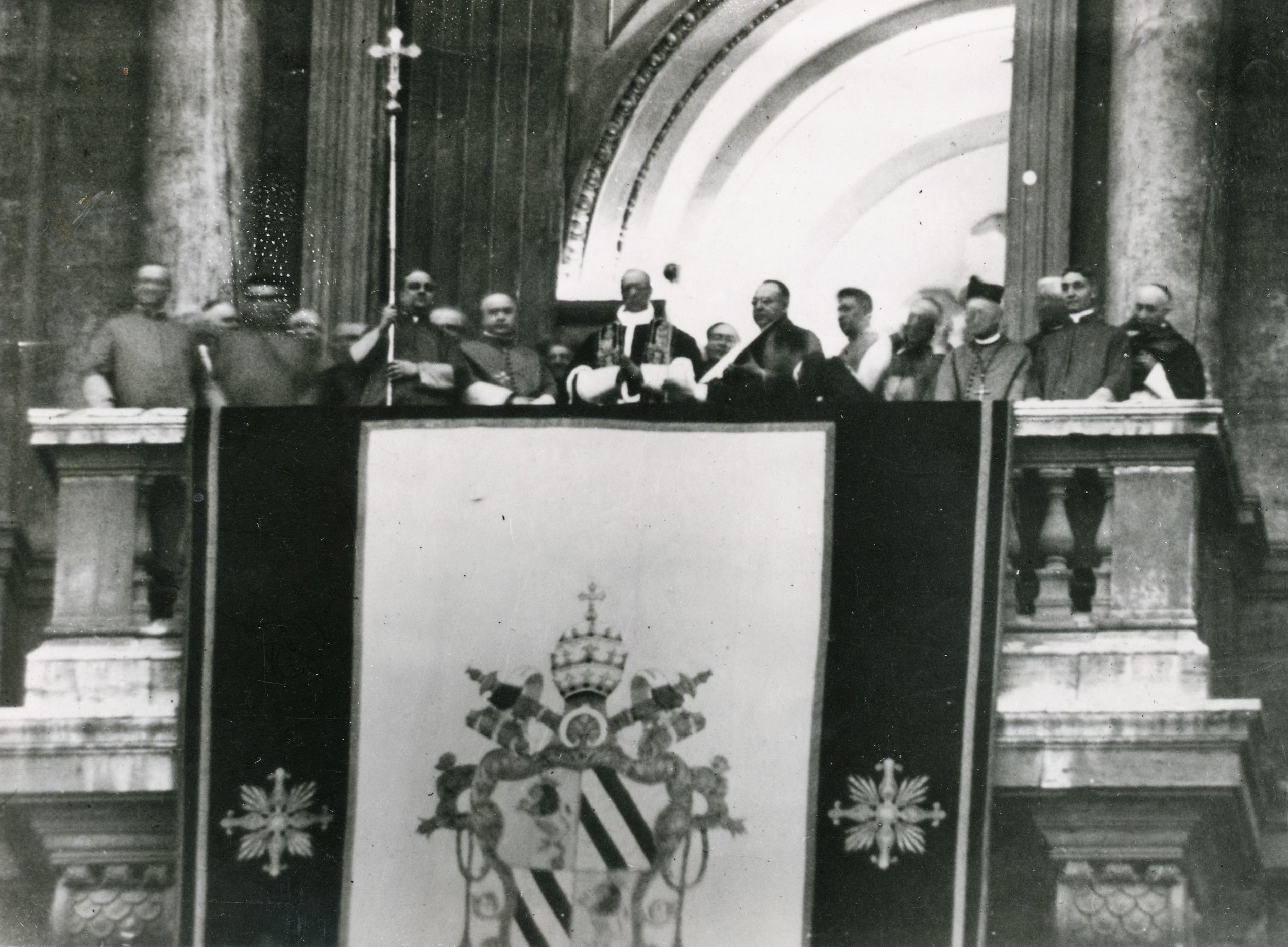
Pope Pius XII appears on the central loggia after his election on 2 March 1939.

The signature of Pius XII never changed.

Pope Pius XII was elected on 2 March 1939, his 63rd birthday, after one day of deliberation and three ballots. Several historians have interpreted the conclave as facing a choice between a diplomatic or a spiritual candidate, and they view Pacelli's diplomatic experience, especially with Germany, as one of the deciding factors in his election. He was the first Secretary of State to be elected pope since the 17th century, and was one of two men to have served as Camerlengo immediately prior to becoming pope.

According to rumor, he asked for another ballot to be taken to ensure the validity of his election. After his election was indeed confirmed, he chose the name Pius XII in honor of his immediate predecessor. He was quoted as saying "I call myself Pius; my whole life was under Popes with this name, but especially as a sign of gratitude towards Pius XI." In December 1937, during his last consistory, Pius XI had strongly hinted to the cardinals that he expected Pacelli to be his successor, saying "He is in your midst."

The coronation took place on 12 March 1939. Upon being elected pope, he was also formally the Grand Master of the Equestrian Order of the Holy Sepulchre of Jerusalem, prefect of the Supreme Sacred Congregation of the Holy Office, prefect of the Sacred Congregation for the Oriental Churches and prefect of the Sacred Consistorial Congregation. There was however a Cardinal-Secretary to run these bodies on a day-to-day basis.

Four dates after his election, Pius wrote to Hitler:

To the Illustrious Herr Adolf Hitler, Führer and Chancellor of the German Reich! Here at the beginning of Our pontificate We wish to assure you that We remain devoted to the spiritual welfare of the German people entrusted to your leadership.... During the many years we spent in Germany, then We did all in Our power to establish harmonious relations between Church and State. Now that the responsibilities of Our pastoral function have increased Our opportunities, how much more ardently do We pray to reach that goal. May the prosperity of the German people and their progress in every domain come, with God's help, to fruition!

=== Appointments ===
After his election, he made Luigi Maglione his successor as Cardinal Secretary of State. Maglione, a seasoned Vatican diplomat, had reestablished diplomatic relations with Switzerland and was for twelve years nuncio in Paris. Yet, Maglione did not exercise the influence of his predecessor Pacelli, who as Pope continued his close relation with Giovanni Battista Montini (later Paul VI) and Domenico Tardini. After Maglione's death in 1944, Pius left the position open and named Tardini head of its foreign section and Montini head of the internal section.

Pius slowly eroded the Italian monopoly on the Curia and employed German and Dutch Jesuit advisors Robert Leiber, Augustin Bea, and Sebastian Tromp. After World War II, Pius appointed more non-Italians than any pope before him. American appointees included Joseph P. Hurley as regent of the nunciature in Belgrade, Gerald P. O'Hara as nuncio to Romania, and Aloisius Joseph Muench as nuncio to Germany. He also supported the elevation of American Cardinal Francis Spellman from a minor to a major role in the church. For the first time, numerous young Europeans, Asians and Americans "were trained in various congregations and secretariats within the Vatican for eventual service throughout the world".

=== Consistories ===
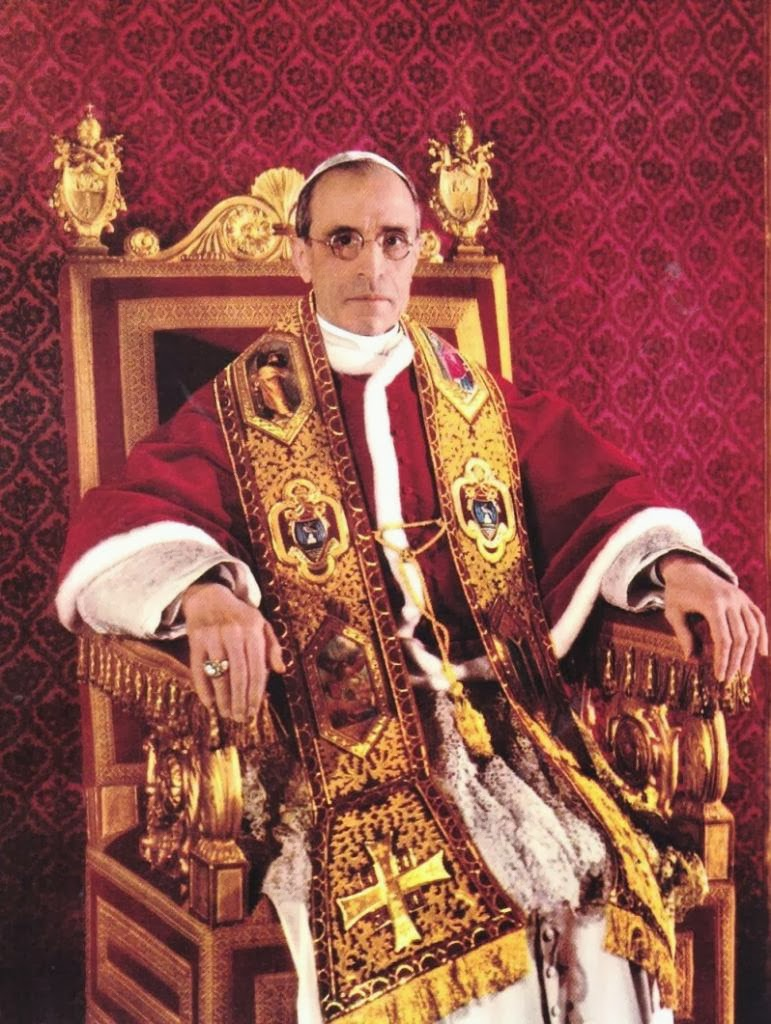
One of the first official color portraits of Pius XII, c. 1939–40

Only twice in his pontificate did Pius hold a consistory to create new cardinals, in contrast to Pius XI, who had done so 17 times in as many years. Pius XII chose not to name new cardinals during World War II, and the number of cardinals shrank to 38.

His first consistory, in 1946, elevated a record 32 new cardinals, almost half of the College of Cardinals and reaching the canonical limit of 70. (Note: John Paul II surpassed this number on 21 February 2001, elevating 44 cardinals. By that time, the limit had been suspended and over 120 cardinals existed.) In this consistory, while maintaining the maximum size of the College of Cardinals at 70, Pius named cardinals from China, India, the Middle East and increased the number of cardinals from the Americas, proportionally lessening the Italian influence.

In his second consistory, in 1953, it was expected that his closest co-workers, Tardini and Montini, would be elevated, and Pius informed the assembled cardinals that both of them were originally on the top of his list, but they turned down the offer and were rewarded instead with other promotions. Both Montini and Tardini would become cardinals shortly after Pius' death; Montini later became Pope Paul VI.

The two consistories of 1946 and 1953 brought an end to over five hundred years of Italians constituting a majority of the College of Cardinals. With few exceptions, Italian prelates accepted the changes positively; there was no protest movement or open opposition to the internationalization efforts.

== Church reforms ==
=== Liturgy reforms ===
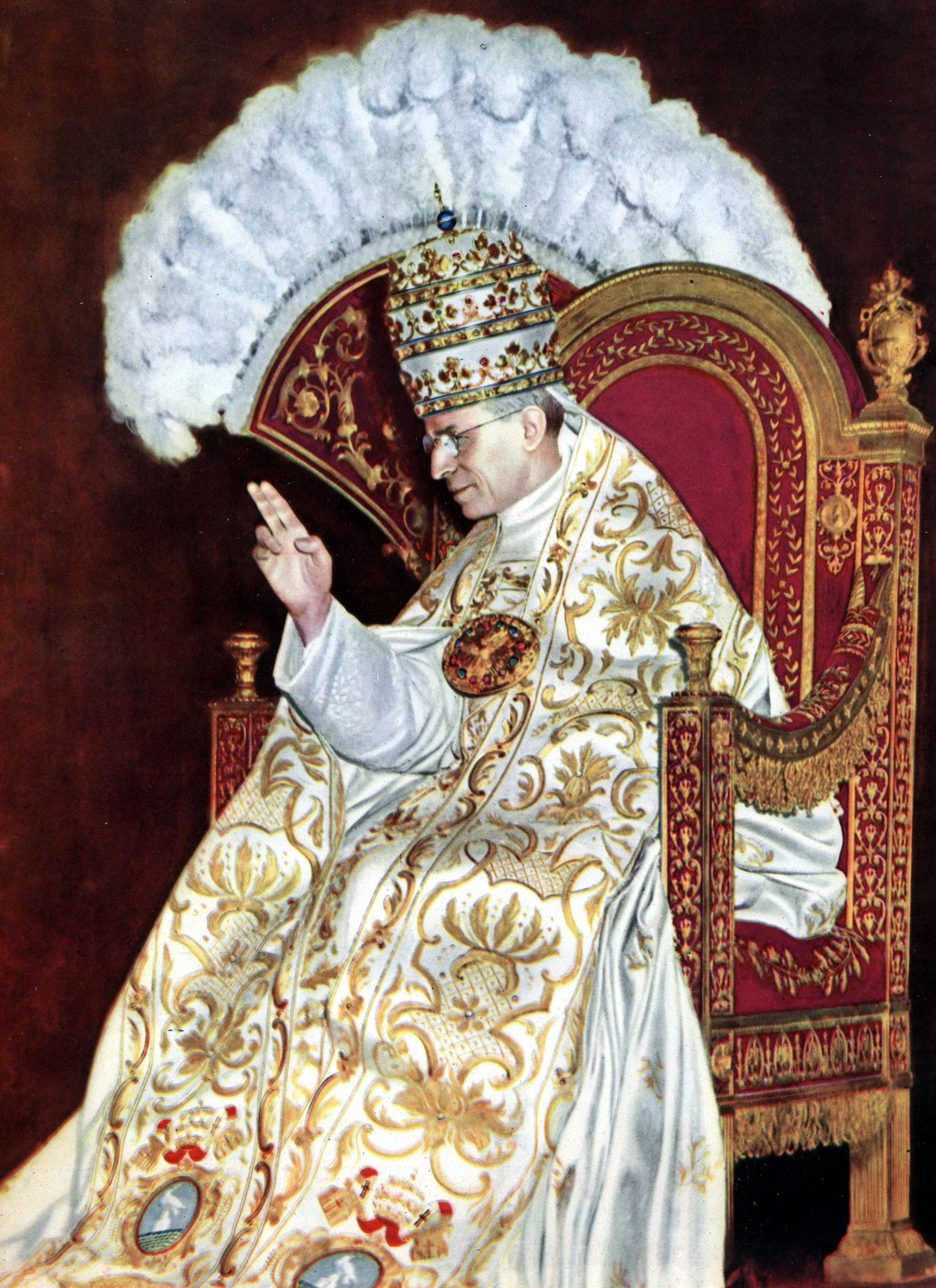
Pope Pius XII seated in the Sedia gestatoria in 1949

In his encyclical Mediator Dei, Pius links liturgy with the last will of Jesus Christ:

But it is His will, that the worship He instituted and practised during His life on earth shall continue ever afterwards without intermission. For He has not left mankind an orphan. He still offers us the support of His powerful, unfailing intercession, acting as our "advocate with the Father". He aids us likewise through His Church, where He is present indefectibly as the ages run their course: through the Church which He constituted "the pillar of truth" and dispenser of grace, and which by His sacrifice on the cross, He founded, consecrated and confirmed forever.

The Church has, therefore, according to Pius, a common aim with Christ himself, teaching all men the truth and offering a pleasing and acceptable sacrifice to God. This way, the church reestablishes the unity between the Creator and His creatures. The Sacrifice of the Altar, being Christ's own actions, conveys and dispenses divine grace from Christ to the members of the Mystical Body.

Bishop Carlos Duarte Costa, a long-time critic of Pius's policies during World War II and an opponent of clerical celibacy and the use of Latin as language of the liturgy, was excommunicated by Pius in 1945. Costa later established a schismatic group called the Brazilian Catholic Apostolic Church.

=== Eastern Catholic churches ===
Pius XII's canon law/Codex Iuris Canonici (CIC) reforms were aimed at decentralizing authority and increasing the independence of the Eastern Catholic Churches. In new constitutions, Eastern Patriarchs were made almost independent from Rome (CIC Orientalis, 1957) Eastern marriage law (CIC Orientalis, 1949), civil law (CIC Orientalis, 1950), laws governing religious associations (CIC Orientalis, 1952) property law (CIC Orientalis, 1952) and other laws. These reforms and writings of Pius were intended to establish Eastern Orientals as equal parts of the mystical body of Christ, as explained in the encyclical Mystici Corporis Christi.

=== Secular institutes ===
In 1947, Pius issued the Apostolic Constitution Provida Mater Ecclesia, establishing "secular institutes". whose 70th anniversary was celebrated in 2017.

In 1950, he provided formal pontifical recognition of Opus Dei.

=== Priests and religious ===
The relationship between secular clergy and regular clergy was explored in an address to a convention of religious orders in 1950, in which he confirmed that the dignity of regular clergy was no less than that of diocesan clergy:

That man errs who thinks that the peculiar form of the secular clergy, as secular, was approved and established by Our Divine Redeemer, and that the special form of the regular clergy is secondary and auxiliary — even though good and to be approved — since it flows from the secular clergy.

With the Apostolic constitution Sedis Sapientiae, Pius added social sciences, sociology, psychology and social psychology to the pastoral training of future priests. He also emphasised the need to systematically analyze the psychological condition of candidates to the priesthood to ensure that they are capable of a life of celibacy and service. Pius added one year to the theological formation of future priests. He included a "pastoral year", an introduction to the practise of parish work.

Pius wrote in Menti Nostrae that the call to constant interior reform and Christian heroism means to be above average and a living example of Christian virtue. The strict norms governing their lives are meant to make them models of Christian perfection for lay people. Bishops are encouraged to look at model saints like Boniface, and Pius X. Priests were encouraged to be living examples of the love of Christ and his sacrifice.

== Theology ==
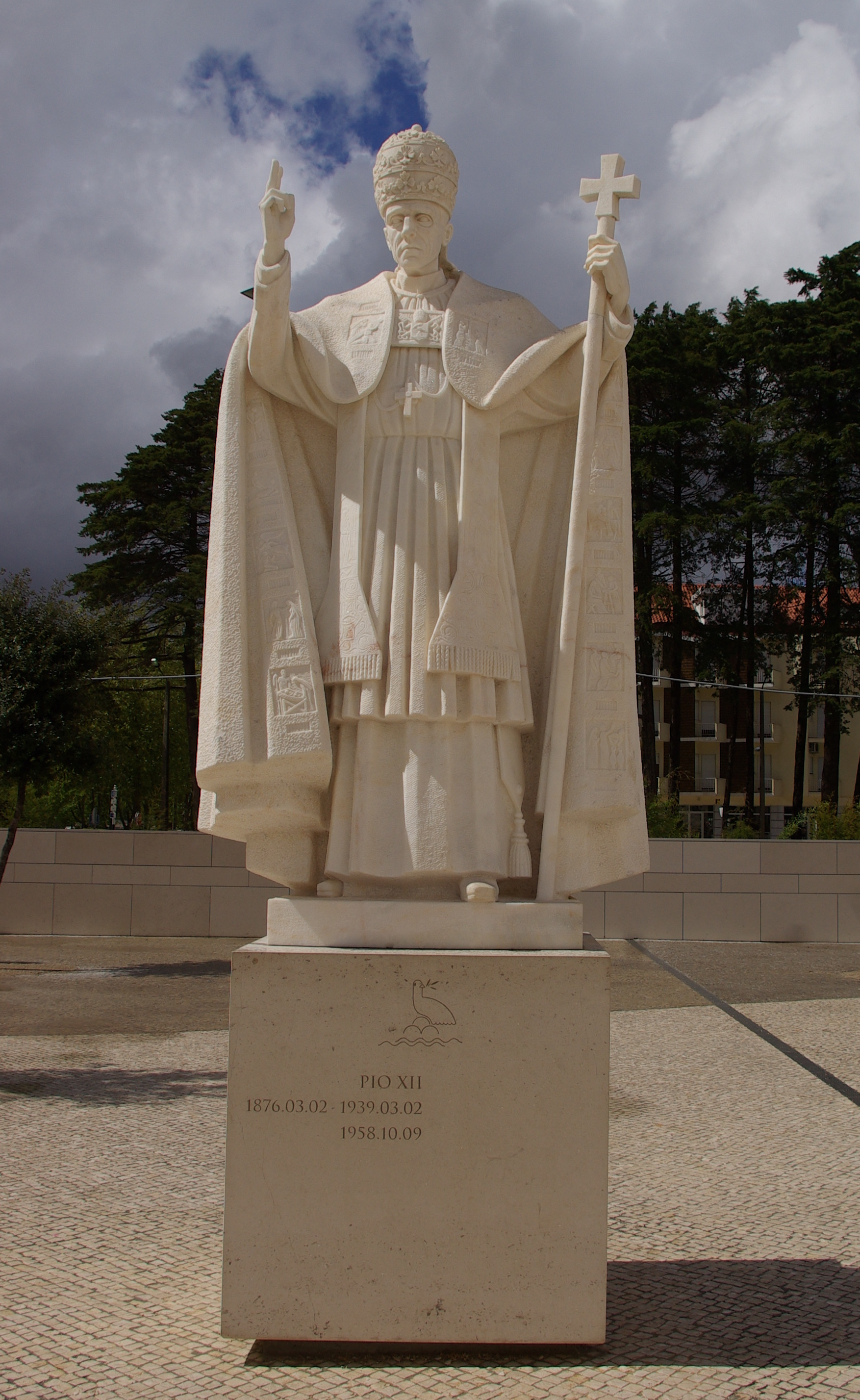
Fátima Statue of Pope Pius XII, who consecrated Russia and the World: "Just as a few years ago We consecrated the entire human race to the Immaculate Heart of the Virgin Mary, Mother of God, so today We consecrate and in a most special manner We entrust all the peoples of Russia to this Immaculate Heart..."

Pius issued 41 encyclicals and almost 1000 messages and speeches during his pontificate. Mystici Corporis Christi clarified membership and participation in the church. Divino afflante Spiritu opened the doors for biblical research. Numerous speeches addressed various aspects of life, education, medicine, politics, war and peace, the life of saints, Mary, things eternal and contemporary. Theologically, Pius specified the nature of the teaching authority of the Catholic Church. He also gave new freedom to engage in theological investigations.

=== Theological orientation ===
==== Biblical research ====
The encyclical Divino afflante Spiritu, published in 1943, emphasized the role of the Bible, freed biblical research from previous limitations, and encouraged theologians to revisit original versions of the Bible in Greek and Hebrew. Noting improvements in archaeology, the encyclical reversed Leo XIII's encyclical that had only advocated going back to the original texts to resolve ambiguity in the Vulgate. The encyclical demands a much better understanding of ancient Hebrew history and traditions. It requires bishops throughout the church to initiate biblical studies for lay people. Pius also requests a reorientation of Catholic teaching and education, relying much more on scripture in sermons and religious instruction.

==== Role of theology ====
This theological investigative freedom did not, however, extend to all aspects of theology. According to Pius, theologians employed by the Catholic Church are assistants, to teach the official teachings of the church and not their own thoughts: they are free to engage in empirical research, which the church generously supports, but in matters of morality and religion, they are subjected to the teaching office and authority of the church, the Magisterium. "The most noble office of theology is to show how a doctrine defined by the Church is contained in the sources of revelation... in that sense in which it has been defined by the Church." The deposit of faith was thus interpreted not to each of the faithful, not even to theologians, but only to the teaching authority of the Church.

=== Mariology and the dogma of the Assumption ===
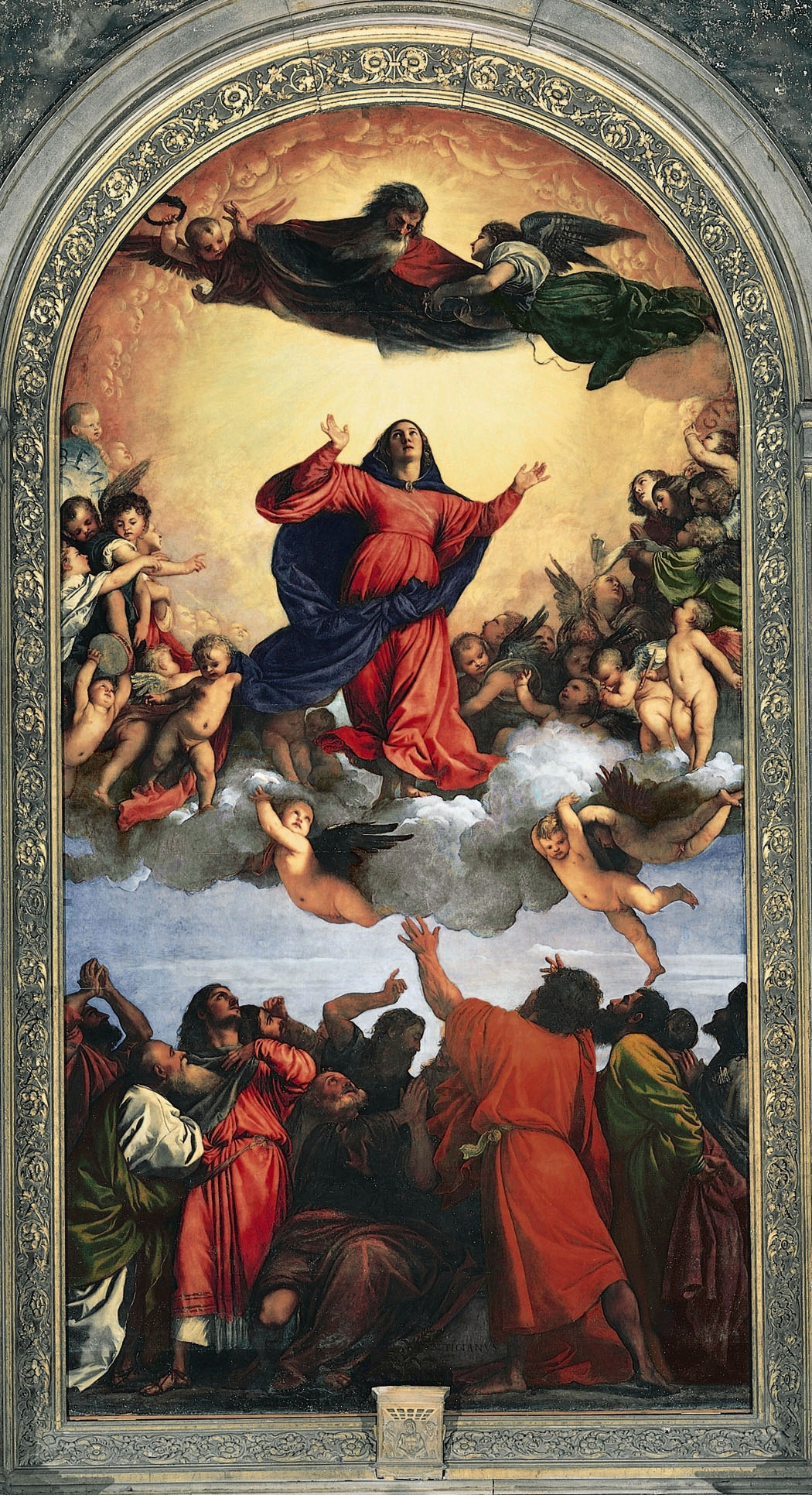
On 1 November 1950, Pius XII defined the dogma of the Assumption (Titian's Assunta (1516–1518) pictured).

==== World consecration to the Immaculate Heart of Mary ====
As a boy and in later life, Pacelli was an ardent follower of the Virgin Mary. He was consecrated as a bishop on 13 May 1917, the first day of the apparitions of Our Lady of Fátima. Based on the Portuguese mystic Alexandrina of Balazar's requests, he consecrated the world to the Immaculate Heart of Mary in 1942. His remains were to be buried on the feast day of Our Lady of Fátima, 13 October 1958.

==== Dogma of the Assumption of Mary ====
In 1950, Pius invoked papal infallibility for the first time since 1854 in defining the dogma of the Assumption of Mary, stating that she, "having completed the course of her earthly life, was assumed body and soul into heavenly glory". To date this is the last time full papal infallibility has been used. The dogma was preceded by the 1946 encyclical Deiparae Virginis Mariae, which asked all Catholic bishops to express their opinion on a possible dogmatization. In September 1953, the encyclical Fulgens corona announced a Marian year for 1954, the centennial of the Dogma of the Immaculate Conception. In the encyclical Ad caeli reginam he promulgated the Queenship of Mary feast. Mystici Corporis Christi summarizes his mariology. On 15 August 1954, the Feast of the Assumption, he initiated the practice of leading the Angelus every Sunday before address to the crowd assembled at Castel Gandolfo.

=== Social teachings ===
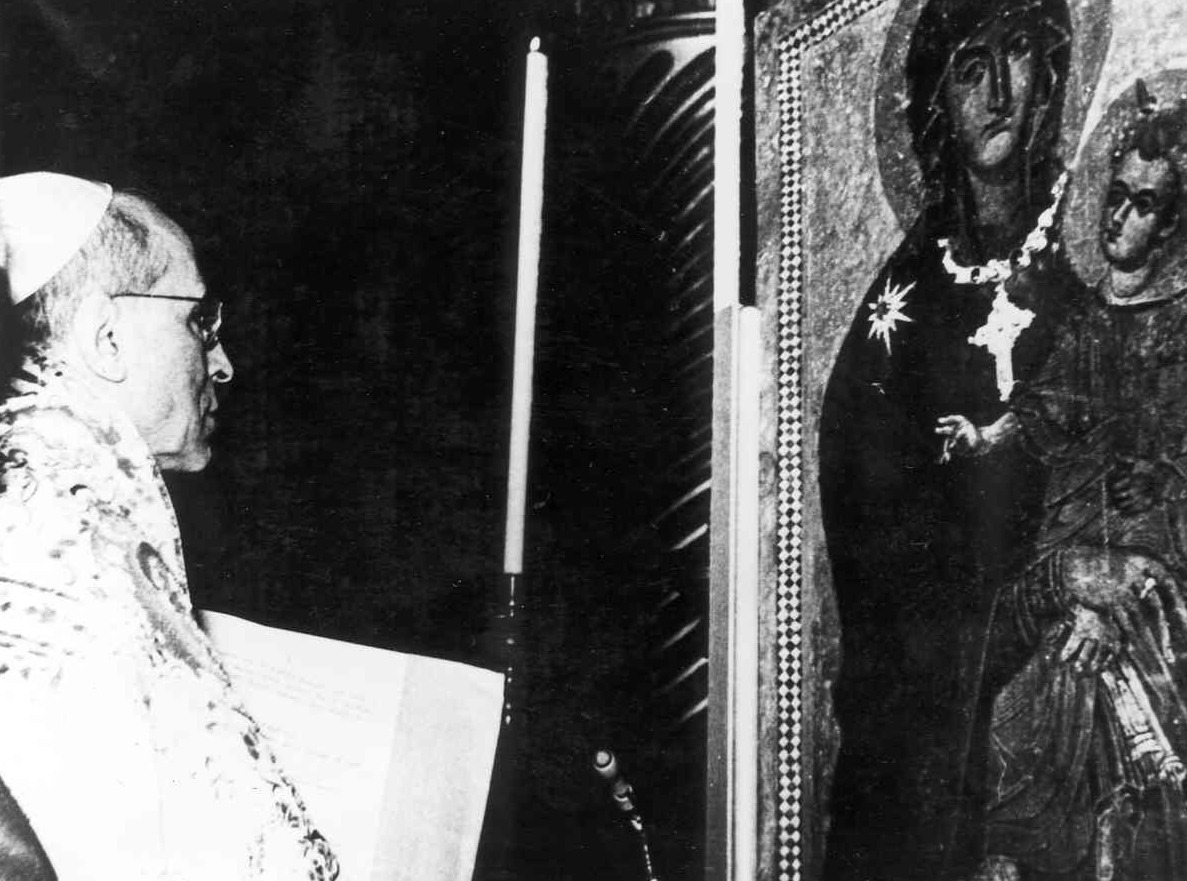
Coronation of the Salus Populi Romani by Pope Pius XII in 1954

==== Medical theology ====
Pius delivered numerous speeches to medical professionals and researchers. He addressed aspects of rights and dignity of patients, medical responsibilities, moral implications of psychological illnesses and the uses of psychopharmacology. He also took on issues like the uses of medicine in the terminally ill, medical lies in face of grave illness, and the rights of family members to make decisions against expert medical advice. Pius was the first pope to declare that the use of pain medicine in terminally ill patients is justified, even if this may shorten the life of the patient, as long as shortening life is not itself the objective.

==== Family and sexuality ====
Pius developed an extensive theology of the family, addressing family roles, sharing of household duties, education of children, conflict resolution, financial dilemmas, psychological problems, illness, taking care of older generations, unemployment, marital holiness and virtue, common prayer, religious discussions and more. He accepted the rhythm method as a moral form of family planning, though only in limited circumstances, within the context of family.

==== Theology and science ====
To Pius, science and religion were heavenly sisters, different manifestations of divine exactness, who could not possibly contradict each other over the long term. Regarding their relation, Leiber wrote: "Pius XII was very careful not to close any doors prematurely. He was energetic on this point and regretted that in the case of Galileo."

==== Evolution of the human body ====
In 1950, Pius promulgated Humani generis, which acknowledged that evolution might accurately describe the biological origins of the human form, but criticized those who "imprudently and indiscreetly hold that evolution... explains the origin of all things". He asserted that since the soul is a spiritual substance, it is not brought into being through transformation of matter, but directly by God, whence the special uniqueness of each person. Fifty years later, John Paul II, stating that scientific evidence now seemed to favor evolutionary theory, upheld the distinction of Pius regarding the human soul. "Even if the human body originates from pre-existent living matter, the spiritual soul is spontaneously created by God."

==== Capital punishment ====
In an address given in 1952, Pius said that the church does not regard the execution of criminals as a violation by the state of the universal right to life:

When it is a question of the execution of a condemned man, the State does not dispose of the individual's right to life. In this case it is reserved to the public power to deprive the condemned person of the enjoyment of life in expiation of his crime when, by his crime, he has already disposed himself of his right to live.

He held that the Church regards criminal penalties as both "medicinal", preventing the criminal from re-offending, and "vindictive", providing retribution for the offence committed, and defended the authority of the state to carry out punishment, including the death penalty.

==== Democracy and monarchy ====
Pius taught that the masses were a threat to true democracy. In such a democracy, liberty is the individual's moral duty and equality is the right of all people to honorably live in the place and station that God has assigned them.

On 1 June 1946, one day before the Italian institutional referendum on whether to abolish or keep the Italian monarchy, Pius delivered a sermon in St. Peter's Square. While he did not directly mention monarchy or republicanism, given the context his speech was nonetheless widely seen as endorsing Umberto II in the referendum, with it being difficult to misunderstand his stance:

The problem is whether one or the other of those nations, of those two Latin sisters [elections were taking place in France on the same day] with several thousands of years of civilization will continue to learn against the solid rock of Christianity,...or on the contrary do they want to hand over the fate of their future to the impossible omnipotence of a material state without extraterrestrial ideals, without religion, and without God. One of these two alternatives shall occur according to whether the names of the champions or the destroyers of Christian civilization emerge victorious from the urns.

After the referendum was successful and the Italian monarchy was abolished, Pius privately agreed with the envoy Myron Taylor "that it would have been far preferable for Italy to remain a monarchy, but he also noted that what was done was done".

=== Encyclicals, writings and speeches ===
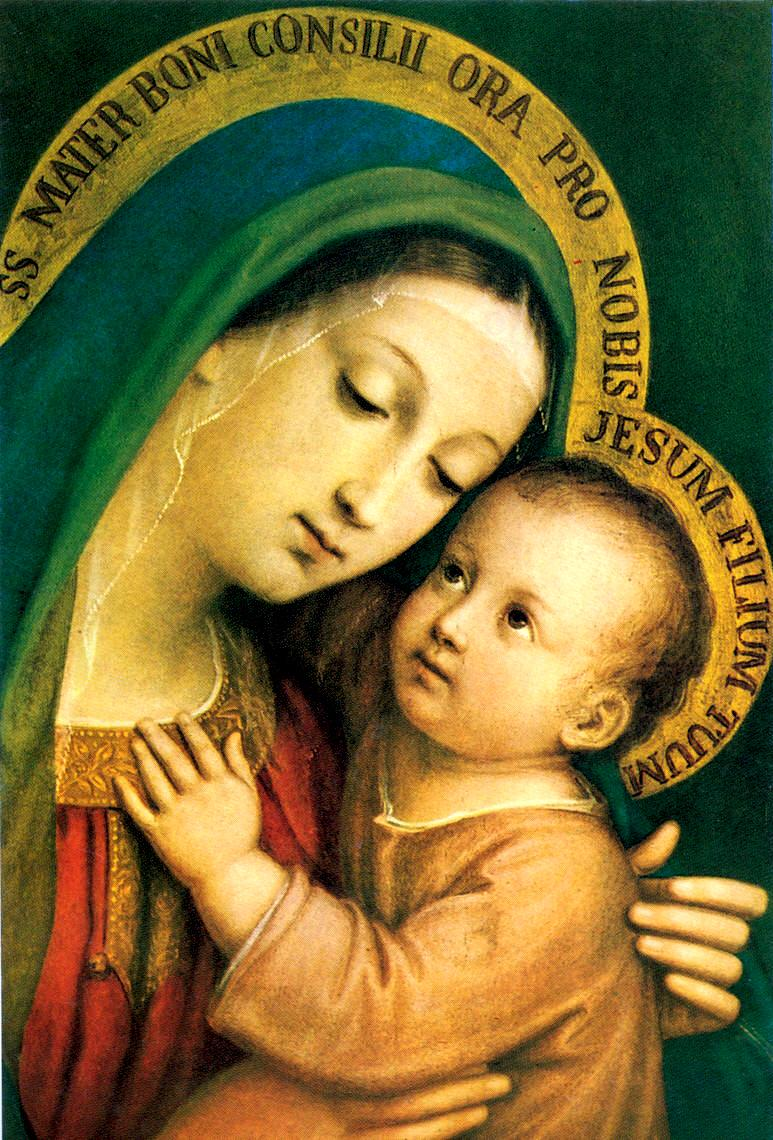
In 1939 Pius XII placed his pontificate under the maternal care of Our Lady of Good Counsel and composed a prayer to her. This 19th-century painting is by Pasquale Sarullo.

Pius issued 41 encyclicals during his pontificate—more than all his successors in the past 50 years taken together—along with many other writings and speeches. His pontificate was the first in history that published papal speeches and addresses in the vernacular on a systematic basis. Until then, papal documents were issued mainly in Latin in Acta Apostolicae Sedis since 1909. Because of the novelty of it all, and a feared occupation of the Vatican by the German Wehrmacht, not all documents exist today. In 1944, a number of papal documents were burned or "walled in".

Several encyclicals addressed the Eastern Catholic Churches. Orientalis Ecclesiae was issued in 1944 on the 15th centenary of the death of Cyril of Alexandria, a saint common to Eastern Christianity and Latin Churches. Pius asks for prayer for better understanding and unification of the churches. Orientales omnes Ecclesias, issued in 1945 on the 350th anniversary of the reunion, is a call to continued unity of the Ruthenian Greek Catholic Church, threatened in its very existence by the authorities of the Soviet Union. Sempiternus Rex was issued in 1951 on the 1500th anniversary of the Ecumenical Council of Chalcedon. It included a call to oriental communities adhering to Miaphysite theology to return to the Catholic Church. Orientales Ecclesias was issued in 1952 and addressed to the Eastern Churches, protesting the continued Stalinist persecution of the church. Several Apostolic Letters were sent to the bishops in the East. In 1956, Pius addressed all bishops of the Eastern Rite. Mary was the subject of encyclical letters to the people of Russia in Fulgens corona, as well as a papal letter to the people of Russia.

Pius made two substantial commentaries on the media. His 1955 discourse The Ideal Movie, originally given in two parts to members of the Italian cinema industry, offered what has been called a "sophisticated analysis of the film industry and the role of cinema in modern society". Compared to his predecessor's teaching, the encyclical Miranda Prorsus (1957) shows a "high regard for the importance of cinema, television, and radio".

=== Feasts and devotions ===
In 1958, Pius declared the Feast of the Holy Face of Jesus as Shrove Tuesday for all Catholics. The first medal of the Holy Face, produced by Sister Maria Pierina de Micheli, based on the image on the Shroud of Turin, had been offered to Pius, who approved the medal and the devotion based on it. (The general devotion to the Holy Face of Jesus had been approved by Leo XIII in 1885 before the Shroud of Turin had been photographed.)

== Canonisations and beatifications ==
Pius canonized numerous people, including Pius X —"both were determined to stamp out, as far as possible, all traces of dangerous heterodoxy"—and Maria Goretti. He beatified Pope Innocent XI. His first canonizations were two women, the founder of a congregation for women, Mary Euphrasia Pelletier, and a young laywoman, Gemma Galgani. Pelletier had a reputation for opening new ways for Catholic charities, helping people in difficulties with the law, who had been neglected by the system and the church. Galgani was a woman in her twenties who was purported to have stigmata.

Pius also named Anthony of Padua as a Doctor of the Church in 1946, conferring on him the title Doctor evangelius.

== World War II ==
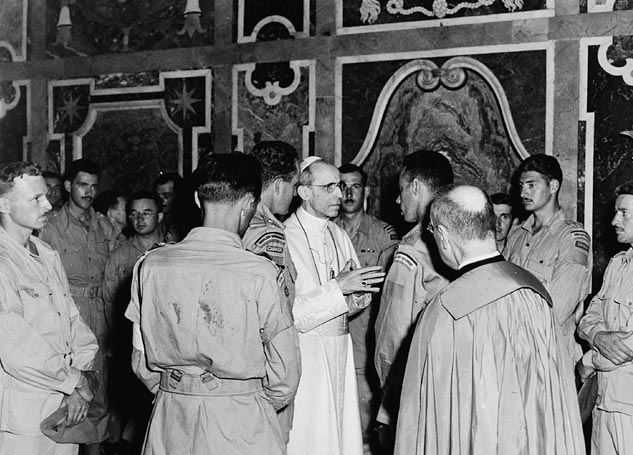
Members of the Canadian Royal 22^{e} Regiment, in audience with Pope Pius XII, following the 1944 Liberation of Rome

Pius lobbied world leaders to prevent the outbreak of World War II and then expressed his dismay that war had come in his October 1939 encyclical Summi Pontificatus. He followed an official stance of Vatican neutrality for the duration of the conflict, opting to mirror the policy of Benedict XV during World War I.

Catholic priest and Stonehill College professor of history Kevin P. Spicer has written about the war years,

During this tumultuous period, Pius XII's primary concern remained, as always, the care, protection, and continuation of the visible Church, especially in Rome and Vatican City, and its mission to bring salvation to its members (Spicer 2004; Besier 2007: 199; Phayer 2008). Unfortunately, the care and concern of those who were not members of the Catholic Church was secondary. Similarly, the visible institution itself, which Pius XII likened to “the mystical Body of Christ,” and the freedom of this institution to continue its otherworldly mission to aid Catholics to salvation through the administration of the sacraments also took precedence over the life and well‐being of any individual Catholic. This posture may account for the silence of the official Church about the thousands of priests and religious who were sent to concentration camps, where many of them perished.

In 1939, Pius turned the Vatican into a centre of aid to and from various parts of the world. At his request, an information office for prisoners of war and refugees operated in the Vatican under Giovanni Battista Montini, which in the years of its existence from 1939 until 1947 received 9,891,497 information requests and produced 11,293,511 answers about missing persons.

Historian Patricia McGoldrick has concluded that during the war,

Pius XII had genuine affection for Germany, though not the criminal element into whose hands it had fallen; he feared Bolshevism, an ideology dedicated to the annihilation of the church of which he was head, but his sympathies lay with the Allies and the democracies, especially the United States, into whose war economy he had transferred and invested the Vatican's considerable assets.

Columbia University professor of history István Déak wrote about Pius during this period,

Fearful of Hitler's wrath, the Pope barely raised his voice against Nazi racism and anticlericalism, and spoke even less about Nazi anti-Semitism. He did not take a stand in defense of the suffering Polish Catholic nation, or of the Christian victims of the Nazi euthanasia program, or of the Jews of his own bishopric in Rome. He tried but failed to stop the American bombing of Rome and the Communist partisan attacks in the city against the German occupiers. The Western allies, when they finally reached Rome in June 1944, were mainly interested in using Pius XII for their own propaganda purposes... Pius XII made it his supreme purpose to assure the survival of the Catholic Church in a time of turmoil. In this, he was successful, although it is still not clear just how, when, and by whom that survival was threatened. In providing help to the victims of Nazi persecution, the Pope undertook much less than could have been expected of a person of his exalted position. And even when he tried, he accomplished little or nothing. His story is, unfortunately, one of the more depressing to come out of the war.

=== Outbreak of war ===
==== Summi Pontificatus ====
Summi Pontificatus, the first encyclical issued by Pius, came out in October 1939. During the drafting of the letter, the Second World War began after the Nazi invasion of Poland — the "dread tempest of war is already raging despite all Our efforts to avert it". In the lengthy document (over 10,000 words in the original Latin), Pius included passages that have been interpreted as criticizing racism, antisemitism, totalitarianism, the attack on Catholic Poland, and the Nazi persecution of the church.

The forgetting of solidarity "imposed by our common origin and by the equality of rational nature in all men" was called "pernicious error". Catholics everywhere were called upon to offer "compassion and help" to the victims of the war. The Pope declared determination to work to hasten the return of peace and trust in prayers for justice, love and mercy, to prevail against the scourge of war. The letter also decried the deaths of noncombatants.

Following themes addressed in Non abbiamo bisogno (1931); Mit brennender Sorge (1937) and Divini Redemptoris (1937), Pius wrote against "anti-Christian movements" and needing to bring back to the church those who were following "a false standard... misled by error, passion, temptation and prejudice, [who] have strayed away from faith in the true God". Pius wrote of "Christians unfortunately more in name than in fact" having shown "cowardice" in the face of persecution by these creeds, and endorsed resistance:

Who among "the Soldiers of Christ" – ecclesiastic or layman – does not feel himself incited and spurred on to a greater vigilance, to a more determined resistance, by the sight of the ever-increasing host of Christ's enemies; as he perceives the spokesmen of these tendencies deny or in practice neglect the vivifying truths and the values inherent in belief in God and in Christ; as he perceives them wantonly break the Tables of God's Commandments to substitute other tables and other standards stripped of the ethical content of the Revelation on Sinai, standards in which the spirit of the Sermon on the Mount and of the Cross has no place?

Pius wrote of a persecuted Church and a time requiring "charity" for victims who had a "right" to compassion. About the invasion of Poland and killing of civilians he wrote:

[This is an] "Hour of Darkness"... in which the spirit of violence and of discord brings indescribable suffering on mankind... The nations swept into the tragic whirlpool of war are perhaps as yet only at the "beginnings of sorrows"... but even now there reigns in thousands of families death and desolation, lamentation and misery. The blood of countless human beings, even noncombatants, raises a piteous dirge over a nation such as Our dear Poland, which, for its fidelity to the Church, for its services in the defense of Christian civilization, written in indelible characters in the annals of history, has a right to the generous and brotherly sympathy of the whole world, while it awaits, relying on the powerful intercession of Mary, Help of Christians, the hour of a resurrection in harmony with the principles of justice and true peace.

The encyclical's Paragraph 48, about "forming cultured native clergy and gradually increasing the number of native Bishops," incorporated the following from Colossians 3:10-11: "Where there is neither Gentile nor Jew, circumcision nor uncircumcision, barbarian nor Scythian, bond nor free. But Christ is all and in all."

With Italy not yet an ally of Hitler in the war, Italians were called upon to remain faithful to the Catholic Church. Pius avoided explicit denunciations of Hitlerism or Stalinism, establishing the "impartial" public tone which would become controversial in later assessment of his pontificate: "A full statement of the doctrinal stand to be taken in face of the errors of today, if necessary, can be put off to another time unless there is disturbance by calamitous external events; for the moment We limit Ourselves to some fundamental observations."

==== Invasion of Poland ====
In Summi Pontificatus, Pius expressed dismay at the killing of non-combatants in the Nazi/Soviet invasion of Poland and expressed hope for the "resurrection" of that country. The Nazis and Soviets commenced a persecution of the Catholic Church in Poland. In April 1940, the Vatican advised the U.S. government that its efforts to provide humanitarian aid had been blocked by the Germans and that the Holy See had been forced to seek indirect channels through which to direct its aid. Michael Phayer, a critic of Pius XII, assesses his policy as having been to "refuse to censure" the "German" invasion and annexation of Poland. This, Phayer wrote, was regarded as a "betrayal" by many Polish Catholics and clergy, who saw his appointment of Hilarius Breitinger as the apostolic administrator for the Wartheland in May 1942, an "implicit recognition" of the breakup of Poland; the opinions of the Volksdeutsche, mostly German Catholic minorities living in occupied Poland, were more mixed. Phayer argues that Pius XII—both before and during his papacy – consistently "deferred to Germany at the expense of Poland", and saw Germany—not Poland—as critical to "rebuilding a large Catholic presence in Central Europe". In May 1942, Kazimierz Papée, Polish ambassador to the Vatican, complained that Pius had failed to condemn the recent wave of atrocities in Poland; when Cardinal Secretary of State Maglione replied that the Vatican could not document individual atrocities, Papée declared, "when something becomes notorious, proof is not required". Although Pius XII received frequent reports about atrocities committed by or against Catholics, his knowledge was incomplete; for example, he wept after the war on learning that Cardinal August Hlond had banned German liturgical services in Poland.

There was a well-known case of Jewish rabbis who, seeking support against the Nazi persecution of Polish Jews in the General Government (Nazi-occupied Polish zone), complained to the representatives of the Catholic Church. The church's attempted intervention caused the Nazis to retaliate by arresting rabbis and deporting them to a death camp. Subsequently, the Catholic Church in Poland abandoned direct intervention, instead focusing on organizing underground aid, with huge international support orchestrated by Pope Pius XII and his Holy See. The Pope was informed about Nazi atrocities committed in Poland by both officials of the Polish Church and the Polish Underground. Those intelligence materials were used by Pius on 11 March 1940 during a formal audience with Minister of Foreign Affairs Joachim von Ribbentrop when the Pope was "listing the date, place, and precise details of each crime" as described by Joseph L. Lichten after others.

==== Early actions to end conflict ====
With Poland overrun, but France and the Low Countries yet to be attacked, Pius continued to hope for a negotiated peace to prevent the spread of the conflict. The similarly minded President Roosevelt reestablished American diplomatic relations with the Vatican after a 70-year hiatus and dispatched Myron C. Taylor as his personal representative. Pius warmly welcomed Roosevelt's envoy and peace initiative, calling it "an exemplary act of fraternal and hearty solidarity... in defence against the chilling breath of aggressive and deadly godless anti-Christian tendencies". American correspondence spoke of "parallel endeavours for peace and the alleviation of suffering". Despite the early collapse of peace hopes, the Taylor mission continued at the Vatican.

According to the Hitler biographer John Toland, following the November 1939 assassination attempt by Johann Georg Elser, Hitler said Pius would have wanted the plot to succeed: "he's no friend of mine". In the spring of 1940, a group of German generals seeking to overthrow Hitler and make peace with the British approached Pius, who acted as an interlocutor between the British and the abortive plot. According to Toland, a lawyer from Munich named Joseph Muller made a clandestine trip to Rome in October 1939, met with Pius and found him willing to act as intermediary. The Vatican agreed to send a letter outlining the bases for peace with England and the participation of the Pope was used to try to persuade the senior German generals Franz Halder and Walther von Brauchitsch to act against Hitler.

Pius warned the Allies of the planned German invasion of the Low Countries in 1940. In Rome in 1942, U.S. envoy Myron C. Taylor, thanked the Holy See for the "forthright and heroic expressions of indignation made by Pope Pius XII when Germany invaded the Low Countries". After Germany proceeded with the invasion later that year, Pius sent expressions of sympathy to Queen Wilhelmina of the Netherlands, King Leopold III of Belgium, and Charlotte, Grand Duchess of Luxembourg. When Mussolini learned of the warnings and the telegrams of sympathy, he took them as a personal affront and had his ambassador to the Vatican file an official protest, charging that Pius had taken sides against Italy's ally Germany. Mussolini's foreign minister Galeazzo Ciano claimed that Pius was "ready to let himself be deported to a concentration camp, rather than do anything against his conscience".

When, in 1940, the Nazi Foreign Minister von Ribbentrop met with Pius and asked why the Pope had sided with the Allies, Pius replied with a list of recent Nazi atrocities and religious persecutions committed against Christians and Jews, in Germany, and in Poland, leading The New York Times to headline its report "Jews Rights Defended" and write of "burning words he spoke to Herr Ribbentrop about religious persecution". During the meeting, von Ribbentrop suggested an overall settlement between the Vatican and the Reich in exchange for Pius instructing the German bishops to refrain from political criticism of the German government, but no agreement was reached.

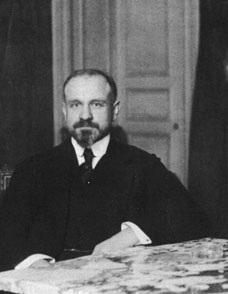
The investments of Bernardino Nogara were critical to the financing of the papacy during World War II.

At a special mass at St. Peter's for the victims of the war, held in November 1940, soon after the commencement of the London Blitz bombing by the Luftwaffe, Pius preached in his homily: "may the whirlwinds, that in the light of day or the dark of night, scatter terror, fire, destruction, and slaughter on helpless folk cease. May justice and charity on one side and on the other be in perfect balance, so that all injustice be repaired, the reign of right restored". Later he appealed to the Allies to exempt Rome from aerial bombing during the Italian campaign, and he visited wounded victims of the Allied bombing of 19 July 1943.

=== Responses to the global conflict ===
Pius's attempts to dissuade Mussolini from joining Hitler in the war proved unsuccessful. In April 1941, Pius granted a private audience to Ante Pavelić, the leader of the newly proclaimed Croatian state (rather than the diplomatic audience Pavelić had wanted). Pius was criticised for his reception of Pavelić: an unattributed British Foreign Office memo on the subject described Pius as "the greatest moral coward of our age". The Vatican did not officially recognise Pavelić's regime. While Pius did not publicly condemn the expulsions and forced conversions to Catholicism perpetrated on Serbs by Pavelić, the Holy See did expressly repudiate the forced conversions in a memorandum dated 25 January 1942, from the Vatican Secretariat of State to the Yugoslavian Legation. The Pope was well informed of Catholic clergy involvement with the Ustaše regime, even possessing a list of clergy members who had "joined in the slaughter", but decided against condemning the regime or taking action against the clergy involved, fearing that it would lead to schism in the Croatian church or undermine the formation of a future Croatian state. Pius would elevate Aloysius Stepinac—a Croatian archbishop convicted of collaborating with the Ustaše by the newly established Yugoslav Communist regime—to the cardinalate in 1953. Phayer agrees that Stepinac's was a "show trial", but states "the charge that he [Pius] supported the Ustaša regime was, of course, true, as everyone knew", and that "if Stepinac had responded to the charges against him, his defense would have inevitably unraveled, exposing the Vatican's support of the genocidal Pavelić". Throughout 1942, the Yugoslav government in exile sent letters of protest to Pius asking him to use all possible means to stop the massacres against the Serbs in the Croat state; however, Pius did nothing.

In 1941, Pius XII interpreted Divini Redemptoris, an encyclical of Pius XI, which forbade Catholics to help Communists, as not applying to military assistance to the Soviet Union. This interpretation assuaged American Catholics who had previously opposed Lend-Lease arrangements with the Soviet Union.

After Italy entered the war, Pius held audiences with German soldiers on what was described as a regular basis. A November 1941 report by a police informant said:

^{His Holiness continues to receive and see, always with pleasure, the German soldiers…. His Holiness often offers each of them words of comfort and of pleasure, saying that he loves their country…. He always gladly agrees to their requests for photographs…. That the Pope takes much pleasure from receiving such soldiers is demonstrated finally by the fact that contrary to the normal practice of the Vatican, he received some groups of them in the afternoon - dedicated by custom instead only to some private and reserved audiences.}

A police informant report of several weeks later stated that "His Holiness this morning in the Vatican, in receiving German officials and other soldiers of undetermined nationality, said, 'If you have done your duty to your country, be always proud of it.'"

In an April 1942 diary entry, Goebbels, who was among the most anticlerical of the Nazi elite and hostile to the pope, wrote that Pius "embraces every opportunity to receive German soldiers in order to impress them with the whole pomp of the Vatican's ceremony." In December 1942 Goebbels wrote, "Visits of German soldiers and officers to the Pope have by no means grown less in number despite his assurances to the contrary. These visits are subject to his approval. Of course he okays them most generously."

After the subsequent Nazi occupation of Rome ended, it was now the liberating forces who were received by Pius. According to Owen Chadwick, "Allied soldiers applied for audiences, and the Pope loved to greet them as a few months before he had loved to give audience to men of the Afrika Korps." Pius in fact mentioned to U.S. General Mark Clark the contrast between the silence when he entered a room of GIs - "when I appear before your American soldiers, they do not utter a sound" - and the cheering that had greeted him when he entered one of his audiences with German soldiers.

In March 1942, Pius established diplomatic relations with the Empire of Japan and received ambassador Ken Harada, who remained in that position until the end of the war. Roosevelt immediately wrote a letter about Pius's decision to Spellman saying that in granting new diplomatic status to an Axis belligerent, a

great error of judgment was made… there must have been a dosen [sic] ways of deferring the action, for one reason or another, at this time… I shall say nothing officially, in all probability, but my heart is torn because it is bound to get out and there will be definitely a bad reaction to thus [sic] unnecessary move.

In June 1942, diplomatic relations were established with the Nationalist government of China. This step was envisaged earlier, but delayed due to Japanese pressure to establish relations with the pro-Japanese Wang Jingwei regime. The first Chinese Minister to the Vatican, Hsieh Shou-kang, was only able to arrive at the Vatican in January 1943, due to difficulties of travel resulting from the war. He remained in that position until late 1946.

The pope employed the new technology of radio and a series of Christmas messages to preach against selfish nationalism and the evils of modern warfare and offer sympathy to the victims of the war. Pius's 1942 Christmas address via Vatican Radio voiced concern at human rights abuses and the murder of innocents based on race. The majority of the speech spoke in general terms about human rights and civil society; at the very end of the speech, Pius mentioned "the hundreds of thousands of persons who, without any fault on their part, sometimes only because of their nationality or race, have been consigned to death or to a slow decline". According to Rittner, the speech remains a "lightning rod" in debates about Pius. The Nazis themselves responded to the speech by stating that it was "one long attack on everything we stand for... He is clearly speaking on behalf of the Jews... He is virtually accusing the German people of injustice toward the Jews, and makes himself the mouthpiece of the Jewish war criminals." The New York Times wrote that "The voice of Pius XII is a lonely voice in the silence and darkness enveloping Europe this Christmas. ... In calling for a 'real new order' based on 'liberty, justice and love', ... the Pope put himself squarely against Hitlerism." Historian Michael Phayer wrote, however, that "it is still not clear whose genocide or which genocide he was referring to". Speaking on the 50th anniversary of Pius's death in 2008, the German Pope Benedict XVI stated that Pius's voice had been "broken by emotion" as he "deplored the situation" with a "clear reference to the deportation and extermination of the Jews".

Several authors have alleged a plot to kidnap Pius by the Nazis during their occupation of Rome in 1943 (Vatican City itself was not occupied); the British historian Owen Chadwick and the Jesuit ADSS editor Robert A. Graham each concluded such claims were an intentional creation of the British Political Warfare Executive. In 2007, subsequent to those accounts, Dan Kurzman published a work in which he asserted that the plot was a fact; Kurzman's claims have, however, been called into question.

In January 1944, as an Allied victory became increasingly certain, the British ambassador to the Vatican reported that "the Cardinal Secretary of State sent for me to say that the Pope hoped that no Allied coloured troops would be among the small number that would be garrisoned at Rome after the occupation. He hastened to add that the Holy See did not draw the colour line but it was hoped that it would be found possible to meet the request."

With Allied forces approaching, Pius warned that he viewed any fighting in Rome, by any combatants, as unacceptable. "We do not hesitate to repeat with as much impartiality as emphasis - whoever ventures to raise his hand against Rome will be guilty of matricide before the entire civilised world and in the judgment of God." As it turned out, the Germans abandoned the city the day the Allies arrived, thereby also allaying Pius's fear, which he'd voiced to both British and American diplomats, that Nazi troops would end their occupation proactively and leave a power vacuum. Pius, in fact, later expressed a wish for the Allied presence in Rome to last, as he was nervous about what might follow. "In discussing the Italian situation to-day," British ambassador Osborne wrote, "the Pope said that he hoped that we should maintain unobtrusive control, if not actual occupation of the country, for some time." At the same time, Pius made clear his sense of his own responsibility for the people of Rome and his authority over what transpired there, even in the presence of an occupying army. "At Via Babuino, no. 186," the Vatican wrote to the U.S. envoy in January 1945, "there has been opened since the month of June 1944 a clandestine house of prostitution. This house is visited continuously by Allied soldiers, almost exclusively colored." Pius followed up in April, "I absolutely do not intend having Rome become the amusement center for Allied officers. I did not allow such a thing to happen under Fascism; I did not allow it under the Germans, nor will I allow it to the Allies."

Pius's Christmas message of 1944 warned against rule by the masses and against secular conceptions of liberty and equality.

Pius advocated a lenient policy towards the Axis by Allied leaders, which he said was part of an effort to prevent what he perceived to be the mistakes made at the end of World War I. On 23 August 1944, he met Winston Churchill, who was visiting Rome. At their meeting, the Pope acknowledged the justice of punishing war criminals, but expressed a hope that the people of Italy would not be punished, preferring that they should be made "full allies" in the remaining war effort.

=== Holocaust ===
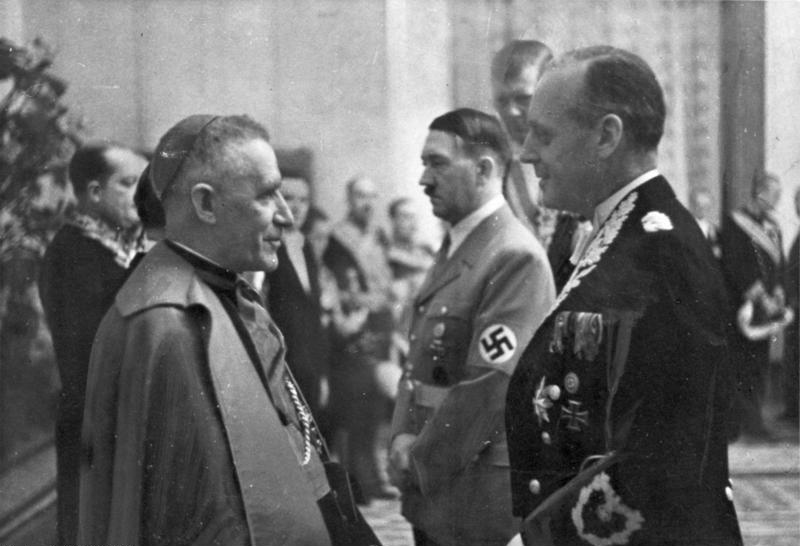
Cesare Orsenigo, Pius XII's nuncio to Germany throughout World War II, with Hitler and Joachim von Ribbentrop

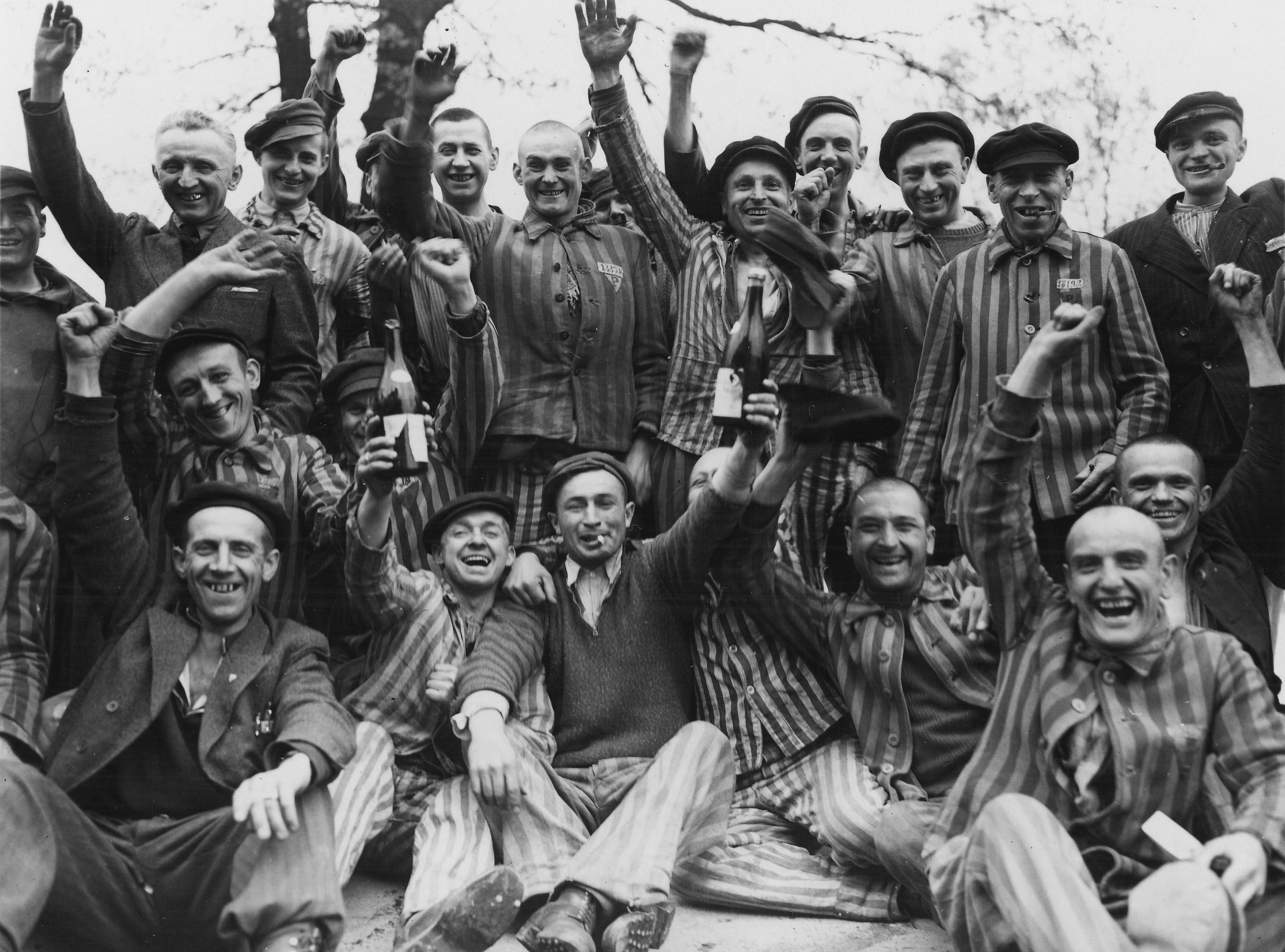
Polish prisoners toast their liberation from Dachau. Nazi persecution of Catholics was at its most severe in occupied Poland.

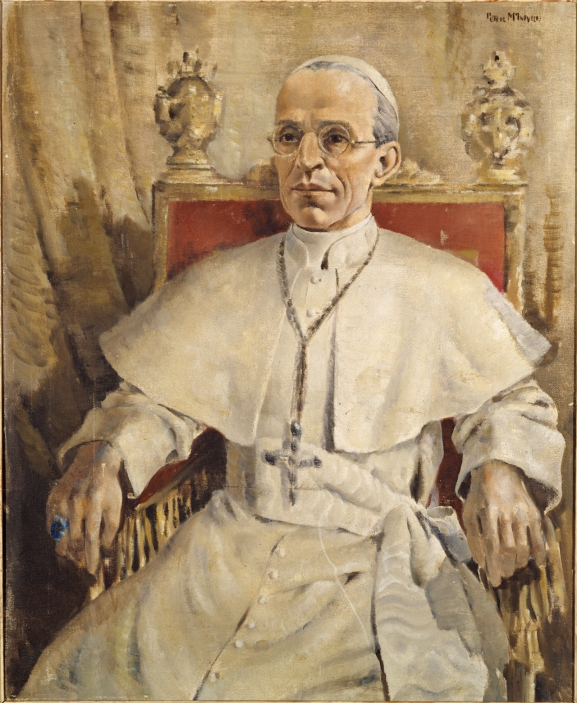
Pope Pius XII by Peter McIntyre c. 1943–1944

St. John's University history professor Frank J. Coppa, commenting in Encyclopedia Britannica on Pius's response to the Holocaust, wrote, "Although he allowed the national hierarchies to assess and respond to the situation in their countries, he established the Vatican Information Service to provide aid to, and information about, thousands of war refugees and instructed the church to provide discreet aid to Jews, which quietly saved thousands of lives." Upon Pius's death in 1958, among many Jewish tributes, the Chief Rabbi of Rome Elio Toaff, said: "Jews will always remember what the Catholic Church did for them by order of the Pope during the Second World War. When the war was raging, Pius spoke out very often to condemn the false race theory."

An alternative view is highly critical of Pius, emphasizing a lack of public statements denouncing Nazi atrocities. The Holy See was among the earliest sovereigns to learn about Nazi atrocities, but Pius remained reluctant to publicly speak against Nazi Germany despite continuing to receive requests for statements from bishops in the Nazi occupied countries (particularly Poland). Academic John Cornwell, in his book, Hitler's Pope, argues that the Pope was weak and vacillating in his approach to Nazism. Cornwell asserts that the Pope did little to challenge the progressing holocaust of the Jews out of fear of provoking the Nazis into invading Vatican City.

In his 1939 Summi Pontificatus first encyclical, Pius reiterated Catholic teaching against racial persecution and antisemitism and affirmed the ethical principles of the "Revelation on Sinai". At Christmas 1942, after evidence of the mass-murder of Jews had emerged, he voiced concern at the murder of "hundreds of thousands" of "faultless" people because of their "nationality or race" and intervened to attempt to block Nazi deportations of Jews in various countries. Diplomats from the Allied countries viewed the message as falling short of the direct condemnation of the Nazi extermination of Jews that they had sought.

Upon his death in 1958, Pius was praised by Israeli Foreign Minister Golda Meir and other world leaders. But his insistence on Vatican neutrality and avoidance of naming the Nazis as the evildoers of the conflict became the foundation for contemporary and later criticisms from some quarters. His strongest public condemnation of genocide was considered inadequate by the Allied Powers, while the Nazis viewed him as an Allied sympathizer who had dishonored his policy of Vatican neutrality. Hitler biographer John Toland, while scathing about Pius's cautious public comments regarding the mistreatment of Jews, stated that the Allies' own record of action against the Holocaust was "shameful", while "The Church, under the Pope's guidance, had already saved the lives of more Jews than all other churches, religious institutions and rescue organizations combined".

In 1939, the newly elected Pope Pius XII appointed several prominent Jewish scholars to posts at the Vatican after they had been dismissed from Italian universities under Fascist leader Benito Mussolini's racial laws. In 1939, the Pope employed a Jewish cartographer, Roberto Almagia, to work on old maps in the Vatican Library. Almagia had been at the Sapienza University of Rome since 1915 but was dismissed after Benito Mussolini's antisemitic legislation of 1938. The pope's appointment of two Jews to the Pontifical Academy of Sciences as well as the hiring of Almagia were reported by The New York Times in the editions of 11 November 1939 and 10 January 1940.

Pius later engineered an agreement—formally approved on 23 June 1939—with the President of Brazil Getúlio Vargas to issue 3,000 visas to "non-Aryan Catholics", i.e., converted Jews. However, over the next 18 months, Brazil's Conselho de Imigração e Colonização (CIC) continued to tighten the restrictions on their issuance, including requiring a baptismal certificate dated before 1933, a substantial monetary transfer to the Banco do Brasil, and approval by the Brazilian Propaganda Office in Berlin. The programme was cancelled 14 months later, after fewer than 1,000 visas had been issued, amid suspicions of "improper conduct" (i.e., continuing to practice Judaism) among those who had received visas.

In April 1939, after the submission of Charles Maurras and the intervention of the Carmel of Lisieux, Pius XII ended his predecessor's ban on Action Française, a virulently antisemitic organization.

Following the German/Soviet invasion of Poland, the Pope's first encyclical, Summi Pontificatus reiterated Catholic teaching against racial persecution and rejected antisemitism, quoting scripture singling out the "principle of equality"—with specific reference to Jews: "there is neither Gentile nor Jew, circumcision nor uncircumcision" and direct affirmation of the Jewish Revelation on Sinai. The forgetting of solidarity "imposed by our common origin and by the equality of rational nature in all men" was called "pernicious error". Catholics everywhere were called upon to offer "compassion and help" to the victims of the war. The Pope declared determination to work to hasten the return of peace and trust in prayers for justice, love and mercy, to prevail against the scourge of war. The letter also decried the deaths of noncombatants.

Secretary of State Maglione received a request from Chief Rabbi of Palestine Isaac Herzog in the spring of 1940 to intercede on behalf of Lithuanian Jews about to be deported to Germany. Pius called Joachim von Ribbentrop on 11 March, repeatedly protesting against the treatment of Jews. Journalist Justin Ewers wrote in a 2008 U.S. News and World Report article that in 1940 Pius asked members of the clergy, on Vatican letterhead, to do whatever they could on behalf of interned Jews.

In 1941, Cardinal Theodor Innitzer of Vienna informed Pius of Jewish deportations from Vienna. Later that year, when asked by the Vichy regime Head of State Philippe Pétain if the Vatican objected to antisemitic laws, Pius responded that the church condemned antisemitism, but would not comment on specific rules. Similarly, when Pétain's regime adopted the "Jewish statutes", the Vichy ambassador to the Vatican, Léon Bérard (a French politician), was told that the legislation did not conflict with Catholic teachings. Valerio Valeri, the nuncio to France, was "embarrassed" when he learned of this publicly from Pétain and personally checked the information with Cardinal Secretary of State Maglione who confirmed the Vatican's position. In June 1942, Pius personally protested against the mass deportations of Jews from France, ordering the papal nuncio to protest to Pétain against "the inhuman arrests and deportations of Jews". In September 1941, Pius objected to a Slovak Jewish Code, which, unlike the earlier Vichy codes, prohibited intermarriage between Jews and non-Jews. In October 1941, Harold H. Tittmann Jr., a U.S. delegate to the Vatican, asked the Pope to condemn the atrocities against Jews; Pius replied that the Vatican wished to remain "neutral", reiterating the neutrality policy that Pius had invoked as early as September 1940.

In 1942, the Slovak chargé d'affaires told Pius that Slovak Jews were being sent to concentration camps. On 11 March 1942, several days before the first transport was due to leave, the chargé d'affaires in Bratislava reported to the Vatican: "I have been assured that this atrocious plan is the handwork of... Prime Minister (Tuka), who confirmed the plan... he dared to tell me—he who makes such a show of his Catholicism—that he saw nothing inhuman or un-Christian in it... the deportation of 80,000 persons to Poland, is equivalent to condemning a great number of them to certain death." The Vatican protested to the Slovak government that it "deplore(s) these... measures which gravely hurt the natural human rights of persons, merely because of their race."

On 18 September 1942, Pius received a letter from Monsignor Montini (future Pope Paul VI), saying "the massacres of the Jews reach frightening proportions and forms". Later that month, Myron Taylor warned Pius that the Vatican's "moral prestige" was being injured by silence on European atrocities, a warning that was echoed simultaneously by representatives from the United Kingdom, Brazil, Uruguay, Belgium, and Poland. Taylor passed a U.S. Government memorandum on to Pius on 26 September 1942 outlining intelligence received from the Jewish Agency for Palestine, which said that Jews from across the Nazi Empire were being systematically "butchered". Taylor asked if the Vatican might have any information that might "tend to confirm the reports", and, if so, what the Pope might be able to do to influence public opinion against the "barbarities".

Secretary of State Maglione handed Harold Tittmann a response to the letter on 10 October. The note thanked Washington for passing on the intelligence, and confirmed that reports of severe measures against the Jews had reached the Vatican from other sources, though it had not been possible to "verify their accuracy". Nevertheless, Maglione stated, "every opportunity is being taken by the Holy See, however, to mitigate the suffering of these unfortunate people". According to David Kertzer's The Pope at War, Monsignor Tardini "told the British envoy to the Vatican in mid-December [1942] that the Pope couldn't speak out about Nazi atrocities because the Vatican hadn't been able to verify the information".

In December 1942, when Tittmann asked Maglione if Pius would issue a proclamation similar to the Allied declaration "German Policy of Extermination of the Jewish Race", Maglione replied that the Vatican was "unable to denounce publicly particular atrocities". Pius directly stated to Tittman that he could not name the Nazis without at the same time mentioning the Bolsheviks.

On 14 December 1942, the German Jesuit and German resistance activist Lothar König wrote to Robert Leiber, the Pope's private secretary and a liaison to the Resistance, to inform him that his sources had confirmed approximately 6,000 Polish and Jewish people were being killed every day in "SS-furnaces" located in an area of what was then German-occupied Poland and is now part of western Ukraine. It also referenced the Nazi death camps at Auschwitz and Dachau. Giovanni Coco, an archivist in the Vatican Apostolic Archive, said that König urged the Holy See to withhold this information to protect the lives of his sources in the resistance.

Following the Nazi/Soviet invasion of Poland, Pius's Summi Pontificatus called for the sympathy of the whole world towards Poland, where "the blood of countless human beings, even noncombatants" was being spilled. He never publicly condemned the Nazi massacre of 1,800,000–1,900,000 non-Jewish Poles, overwhelmingly Catholic (including 2,935 members of the Catholic clergy). In late 1942, he advised German and Hungarian bishops to speak out against the massacres on the Eastern Front. In his 1942 Christmas Eve message, Pius expressed concern for "those hundreds of thousands, who... sometimes only by reason of their nationality or race, are marked down for death or progressive extinction. In April 1943, Tardini advised him that it would be politically advantageous after the war to take steps to help Slovak Jews.

In January 1943, Pius declined to denounce publicly the Nazi discrimination against Jews, despite requests to do so from Władysław Raczkiewicz, president of the Polish government-in-exile, and Bishop Konrad von Preysing of Berlin. According to Toland, in June 1943, Pius addressed the issue of mistreatment of Jews at a conference of the Sacred College of Cardinals and said: "Every word We address to the competent authority on this subject, and all Our public utterances have to be carefully weighed and measured by Us in the interests of the victims themselves, lest, contrary to Our intentions, We make their situation worse and harder to bear".

On 26 September 1943, following the German occupation of northern Italy, Nazi officials gave Jewish leaders in Rome 36 hours to produce 50 kilograms (110 lb) of gold (or the equivalent), threatening to take 300 hostages. Then Chief Rabbi of Rome Israel Zolli recounts in his memoir that he was selected to go to the Vatican and seek help. The Vatican offered to loan 15 kilos, but the offer proved unnecessary when the Jews received an extension. Soon afterward, when deportations from Italy were imminent, 477 Jews were hidden in the Vatican itself and another 4,238 were protected in Roman monasteries and convents. Phayer argues that it was German diplomats in Rome who were the "initiators of the effort to save the city's Jews", but holds that Pius "cooperated in this attempt at rescue", while agreeing with Zuccotti that the Pope "did not give orders" for any Catholic institution to hide Jews. One fifth of Roman Jews ended up being deported.

On 30 April 1943, Pius wrote to Bishop Konrad von Preysing of Berlin to say: "We give to the pastors who are working on the local level the duty of determining if and to what degree the danger of reprisals and of various forms of oppression occasioned by episcopal declarations... ad maiora mala vitanda (to avoid worse)... seem to advise caution. Here lies one of the reasons, why We impose self-restraint on Ourselves in our speeches; the experience, that we made in 1942 with papal addresses, which We authorized to be forwarded to the Believers, justifies our opinion, as far as We see.... The Holy See has done whatever was in its power, with charitable, financial and moral assistance. To say nothing of the substantial sums which we spent in American money for the fares of immigrants."

On 28 October 1943, Ernst von Weizsäcker, the German Ambassador to the Vatican, telegraphed Berlin that "the Pope has not yet let himself be persuaded to make an official condemnation of the deportation of the Roman Jews.... Since it is currently thought that the Germans will take no further steps against the Jews in Rome, the question of our relations with the Vatican may be considered closed."

In March 1944, the nuncio in Budapest, Angelo Rotta, appealed to the Hungarian government to moderate its treatment of the Jews of Hungary, and during the months ahead, Rotta worked assiduously to rescue Hungarian Jews who would otherwise have been murdered. In interviews in the 1980s and 2000s, Tibor Baranski stated that Pius had ordered Rotta and other papal legates to hide and shelter Jews.

After George Mantello, Jewish First Secretary of El Salvador in Switzerland, received the Auschwitz Protocol with much delay around June 22, 1944 he immediately publicized its summary. From about June 24, 1944 in Switzerland that led to large-scale grassroots protests, Sunday masses and about 400 articles in the papers about the barbarism against Europe's Jews. These unprecedented events created so much "noise" that it attracted international attention to the large-scale daily deportation of Hungary's Jews to Auschwitz since May 1944. Protests by the King of Sweden, the International Red Cross, the United States, Britain and the Vatican forced Hungary's Regent Miklos Horthy to order cessation of most deportations of Jews from Hungary to Auschwitz on July 6, 1944 and termination of transports three days later. That saved many of the Jews of Hungary.

After Rome was liberated in June 1944, the surviving Jews of Rome were able to come out of hiding. The Italian campaign continued, however, and in the north of Italy Nazis continued to round up Jews and send them to death camps. In July, the chief rabbis of Palestine cabled Vatican Secretary of State Maglione,

We understand Apostolic Delegate [responsible for Jerusalem] Father Hughes will these days convey our request audience with His Holiness reference position European Jewry. Since we contacted news arrived position rapidly worsening. The voice of God and our tormented brethren will give us no rest till we confer with His Holiness, who has ever proffered helping hand oppressed Israel. View extreme urgency pray petition His Holiness expedite grant audience. Anticipatory thanks.

It's now known, following the opening of the Vatican archives, that the note appended to the cable read, "As for the audience requested by Chief Rabbi Herzog of Jerusalem, the decision of the Holy Father is this: 'He believes it well not to respond.'"

In 1944, Pius appealed to 13 Latin American governments to accept "emergency passports", although it also took the intervention of the United States Department of State for those countries to honor the documents. The Kaltenbrunner Report to Hitler, dated 29 November 1944, against the backdrop of the 20 July 1944 Plot to assassinate Hitler, states that the Pope was somehow a conspirator, specifically naming Eugenio Pacelli (Pope Pius XII), as being a party in the attempt.

==== Jewish orphans controversy ====
In 2005, Corriere della Sera published a document dated 20 November 1946 on the subject of Jewish children baptized in wartime France. The document ordered that baptized children, if orphaned, should be kept in Catholic custody and stated that the decision "has been approved by the Holy Father". Nuncio Angelo Roncalli (who became Pope John XXIII, and was recognized by Yad Vashem as Righteous Among the Nations) ignored this directive. Abe Foxman, the national director of the Anti-Defamation League (ADL), who had himself been baptized as a child and had undergone a custody battle afterwards, called for an immediate freeze on Pius's beatification process until the relevant Vatican Secret Archives and baptismal records were opened. Two Italian scholars, Matteo Luigi Napolitano and Andrea Tornielli, confirmed that the memorandum was genuine, although the reporting by the Corriere della Sera was misleading, as the document had originated in the French Catholic Church archives rather than the Vatican archives and strictly concerned itself with children without living blood relatives who were supposed to be handed over to Jewish organizations.

Writings from released Vatican records revealed that Pius was personally but secretly involved in hiding the Finaly children from their Jewish family in an ultimately failed attempt to keep them Catholic after their secret baptism done against the wishes of their family. The French Catholic Church received very bad press from the affair, and several nuns and monks were jailed for the kidnapping before the children were discovered and spirited away to Israel. Only recently was the Pope's personal involvement revealed.

== Post-World War II ==
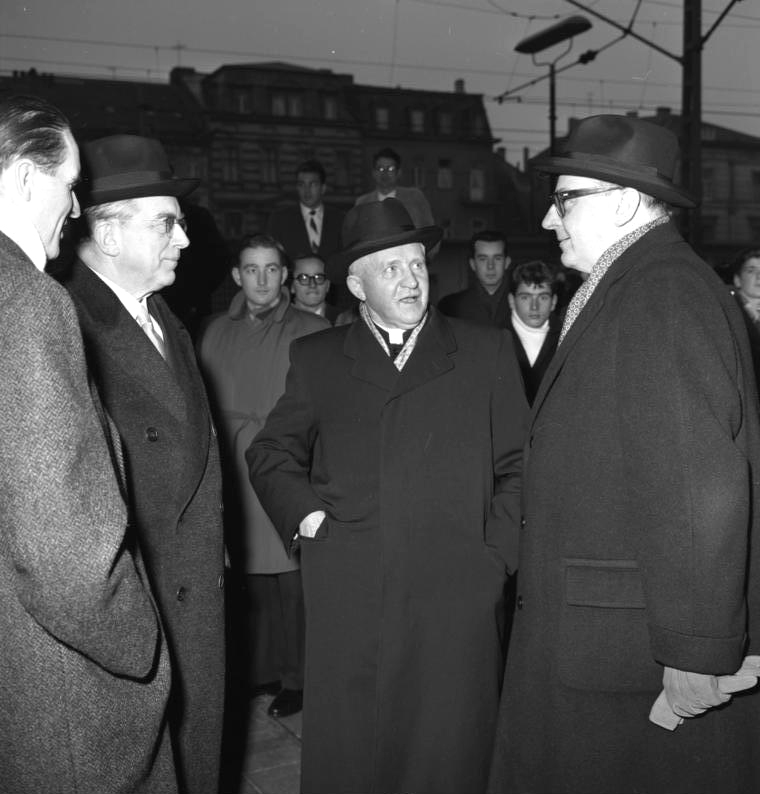
Bishop Aloisius Joseph Muench, Pius XII's post-war liaison to the Office of Military Government, United States

After World War II, Pius focused on material aid to war-torn Europe, internal internationalization of the Catholic Church, and the development of its worldwide diplomatic relations. His encyclicals Evangelii praecones and Fidei donum, issued in 1951 and 1957, increased the local decision-making of Catholic missions, many of which became independent dioceses. Pius demanded recognition of local cultures as fully equal to European culture. Though his language retained old conceptions – Africa, for example, merited special attention since the church there worked 'to forward her work among the heathen multitudes' – in 1956 he expressed solidarity with the 'non-Europeans who aspire to full political independence'.

In the immediate aftermath of the war, Pius elevated a number of high-profile resistors of Nazism to the College of Cardinals in 1946, among them the German bishops Joseph Frings of Cologne, Clemens von Galen of Münster and Konrad von Preysing of Berlin. From elsewhere in liberated Europe, Pius selected other resistors: the Dutch archbishop Johannes de Jong; the Hungarian bishop József Mindszenty; the Polish archbishop Adam Stefan Sapieha; and the French archbishop Jules-Géraud Saliège. In 1946 and 1953 respectively, he named as cardinals Thomas Tien Ken-sin of China and Valerian Gracias of India – the first indigenous Catholics of their respective nations to sit in the College of Cardinals. The Italian papal diplomat Angelo Roncalli (later Pope John XXIII) and Polish Archbishop Stefan Wyszyński were others among those elevated in 1953.

A German contingent dominated his inner circle at this period — the German Jesuits Robert Leiber, Wilhelm Hentrich and Ivo Zeiger. His confessor Augustin Bea was a German Jesuit, and Pascalina Lehnert and other German speaking sisters of the papal household added to this element. The American bishop Aloisius Muench wrote in 1948 that Pius was 'more interested in affairs of the Church in Germany than in any other part of the Church' and resolved to make the postwar German crisis a top priority – 'its refugee crisis, poverty, hunger and disease, the fate of prisoners-of-war and accused war criminals, the disruption to the internal organization and communal life of German Catholicism, and Germany's uncertain political future'.

Pius was an anti-communist.As he sought to secure resources from abroad to aid postwar recovery, believing deprivation fueled political agitation, so he also sought to influence Italian politics. In January 1948, Luigi Gedda, of Italy's Catholic Action movement, was called to the Vatican as the election campaign for the first parliament of Italy's post-fascist republic was underway.

Pius was distrustful of Alcide De Gasperi and Italy's Christian Democrats, considering the party indecisive and fractious – reformist currents within it particularly, which tended to the moderate Left – represented by the Sicilian priest Luigi Sturzo for example – he considered too accommodating to the Left. On the eve of the 1952 local elections in Rome, in which the Communist and Socialist parties threatened to win out, he used informal connections to make his views known. Pius stated that the war against Communism was a holy war and excommunicated members of the Italian Communist Party. Having decided to encourage the Christian Democrats to consider a political alliance with the Rightist parties as part of an anti-left coalition, he asked the Jesuit Father Riccardo Lombardi to speak with De Gasperi to consider such an alliance – an electoral alliance with those even of monarchist and neo-fascist tendencies — including the Italian Social Movement. Adopting a domino theory, he warned that if "the Communists win in Rome, in Italy, it will cast a shadow on the entire world: France would become Communist, and then Spain and then all of Europe." He also urged Chinese Catholics to resist the People's Republic of China government.

== Later life, illness and death ==
=== Late years ===
A long illness in late 1954 caused the pope to consider abdication. Afterwards, changes in his work habits became noticeable. He avoided long ceremonies, canonizations and consistories, and displayed hesitancy in personnel matters. He found it increasingly difficult to chastise subordinates and appointees such as his physician, Riccardo Galeazzi-Lisi, who after numerous indiscretions was excluded from papal service for the last years, but, keeping his title, was able to enter the papal apartments to photograph the dying pope, which he sold to French magazines. Pius underwent three courses of cellular rejuvenation treatment administered by Paul Niehans, the most important in 1954 when Pius was gravely ill. Side effects of the treatment included hallucinations, from which he suffered in his last years. "These years were also plagued by horrific nightmares. Pacelli's blood-curdling screams could be heard throughout the papal apartments."

Pius often elevated young priests as bishops, such as Julius Döpfner (35 years) and Karol Wojtyła (later Pope John Paul II, 38 years), one of his last appointees. He took a firm stand against pastoral experiments, such as worker-priests, who worked full-time in factories and joined political parties and unions. He continued to defend Thomism as worthy of continued reform and as superior to modern trends such as phenomenology or existentialism.

=== Illness and death ===
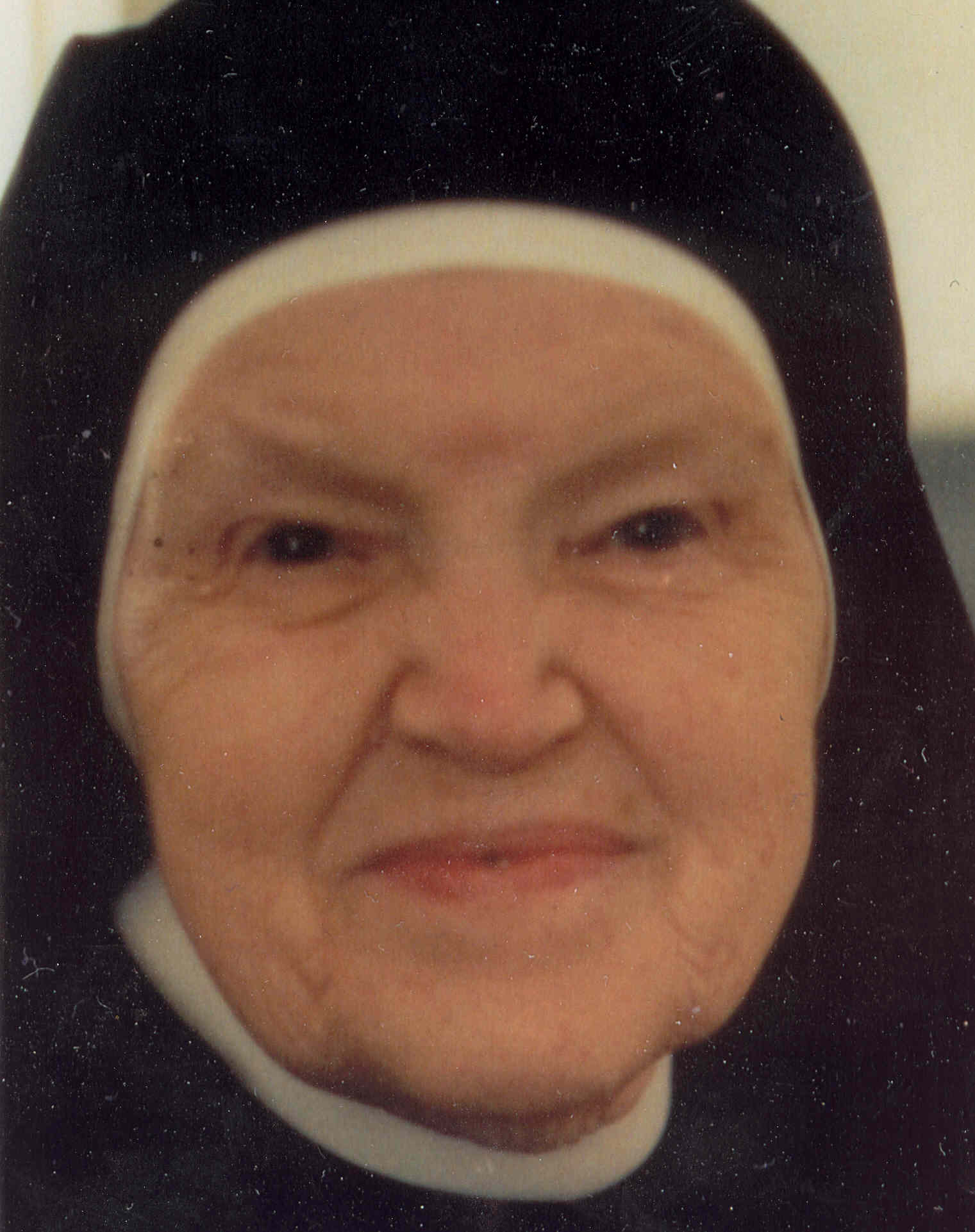
Mother Pascalina Lehnert, Pius XII's housekeeper and confidant for 41 years, until his death

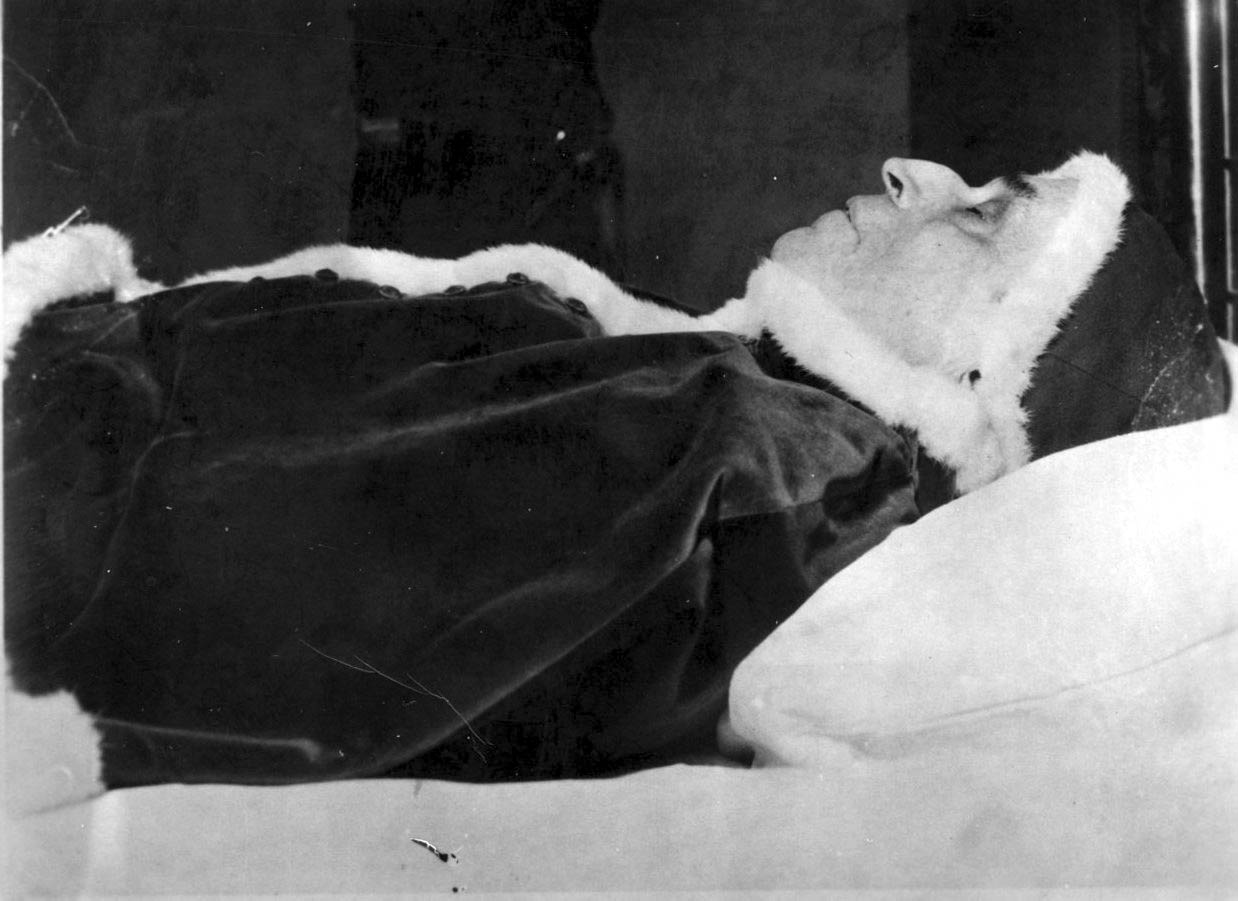
Photograph of Pius XII on his deathbed in Castel Gandolfo, taken on 10 October 1958

With frequent absences from work, Pius came to depend heavily on a few close colleagues, especially his aide Domenico Tardini, his speechwriter Robert Leiber, and his housekeeper Pascalina Lehnert. He still addressed lay people and groups about a wide range of topics. Sometimes he answered specific moral questions addressed to him. To professional associations he explained specific occupational ethics in light of church teachings. Leiber helped him occasionally with his speeches and publications. Sister Pascalina was for forty years his "housekeeper, muse and lifelong companion".

On 6 October 1958, at around 8:30 CET (7:30 GMT), he suffered a stroke, having taken ill the previous day after a series of meetings, and received the last rites. His condition improved until 8 October, when he suffered a second stroke. By mid-afternoon, his doctors had reported that he was suffering from cardiopulmonary collapse, and by 15:00 CET (14:00 GMT) believed death was imminent. Just before sunset, he contracted pneumonia and doctors administered oxygen and plasma. On the last full day of his life, his temperature rose steadily and his breathing became difficult. At 3:52 CET (2:52 GMT) on 9 October, he died, reportedly after having smiled and lowered his head; his last words were reportedly "Pray. Pray that this regrettable situation for the church may end". The cause of death was recorded as acute heart failure. His doctor Gaspanini said afterwards: "The Holy Father did not die because of any specific illness. He was completely exhausted. He was overworked beyond limit. His heart was healthy, his lungs were good. He could have lived another 20 years, had he spared himself."

Spain declared ten days of mourning, Brazil five days of mourning; Portugal and Cuba three days of mourning, and Italy three days of mourning and the closure of offices and schools. The Testament of Pope Pius XII was published in the month of his death.

=== Botched embalming ===
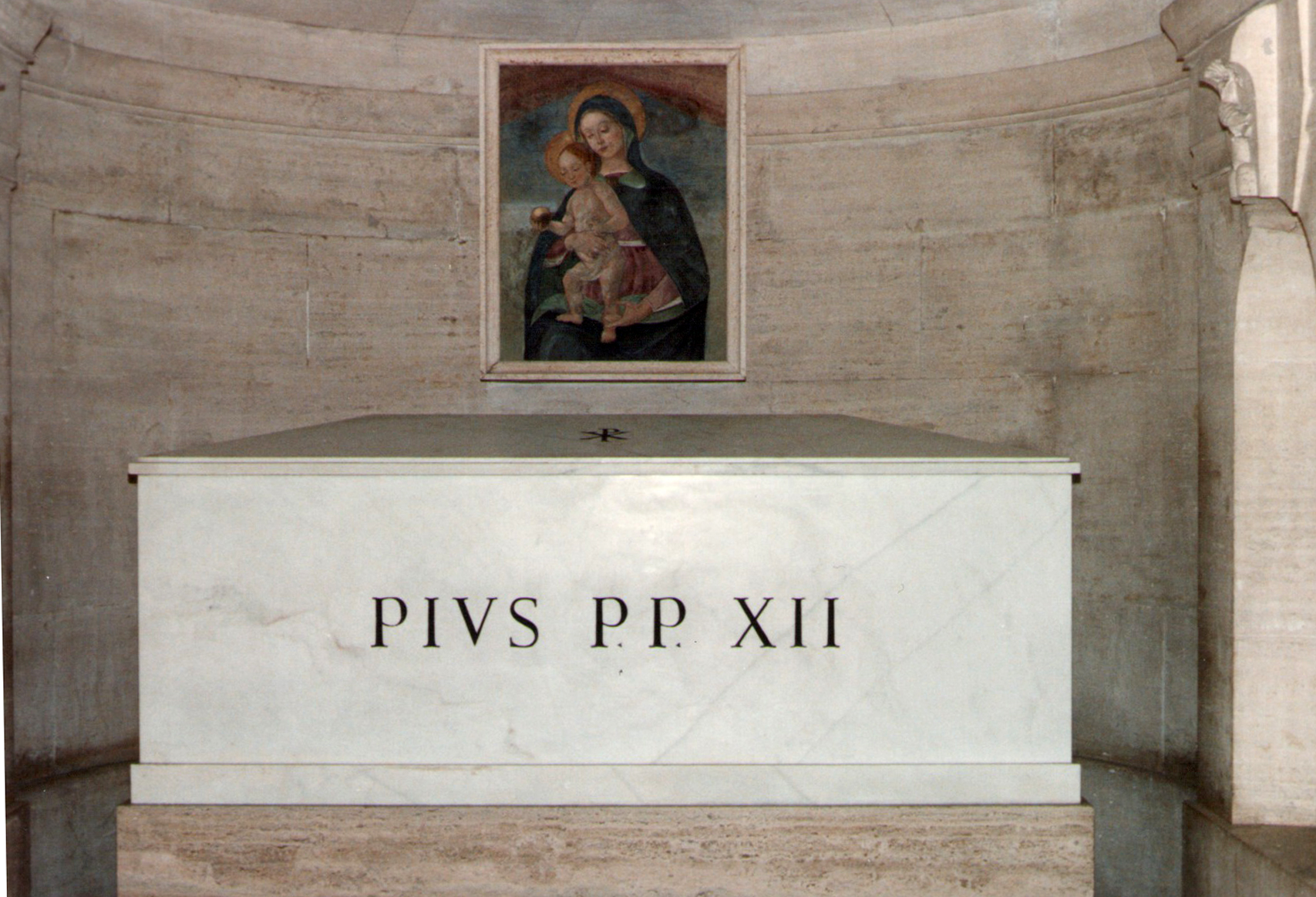
The Pope of Mary: A Madonna and Child, added by John Paul II in 1982, hangs over the tomb of Pius XII.

Pius's physician, Riccardo Galeazzi-Lisi, reported that the pontiff's body was embalmed in the room where he died using a novel process invented by Oreste Nuzzi.

Pius did not want the vital organs removed from his body, demanding instead that it be kept in the same condition "in which God created it". According to Galeazzi-Lisi, this was the reason he and Nuzzi used an atypical embalming procedure. In a controversial press conference, Galeazzi-Lisi described Pius's embalming in great detail, claiming to have used the same system of oils and resins with which the body of Jesus was preserved.

Galeazzi-Lisi asserted that the new process would "preserve the body indefinitely in its natural state". However, whatever chance the new embalming process had of preserving the body was obliterated by intense heat in Castel Gandolfo during the embalming process. As a result, the body decomposed rapidly and the viewing of the faithful had to be abruptly terminated.

Galeazzi-Lisi reported that heat in the halls where the body of the late pope lay in state caused chemical reactions which required it to be treated twice after the original preparation. Others describe Galeazzi and Nuzzi "crawling over the catafalque in the dead of night... to renew their embalming". The body reportedly turned "emerald green", and the Swiss guards stationed around Pius's body were said to have become ill during their vigil, with the smell of the chemicals and resins causing their eyes to water.

=== Funeral ===
Pius's funeral procession into Rome was the largest congregation of Romans as of that date. Cardinal Roncalli wrote in his diary on 11 October 1958 that probably no Roman had enjoyed such a triumph, which he viewed as a reflection of the spiritual majesty and religious dignity of the late pontiff. When Pius was interred, the small crucifix and rosary that he held in his hands as he died were buried with him.

== Cause for beatification ==
Venerable Pius XII
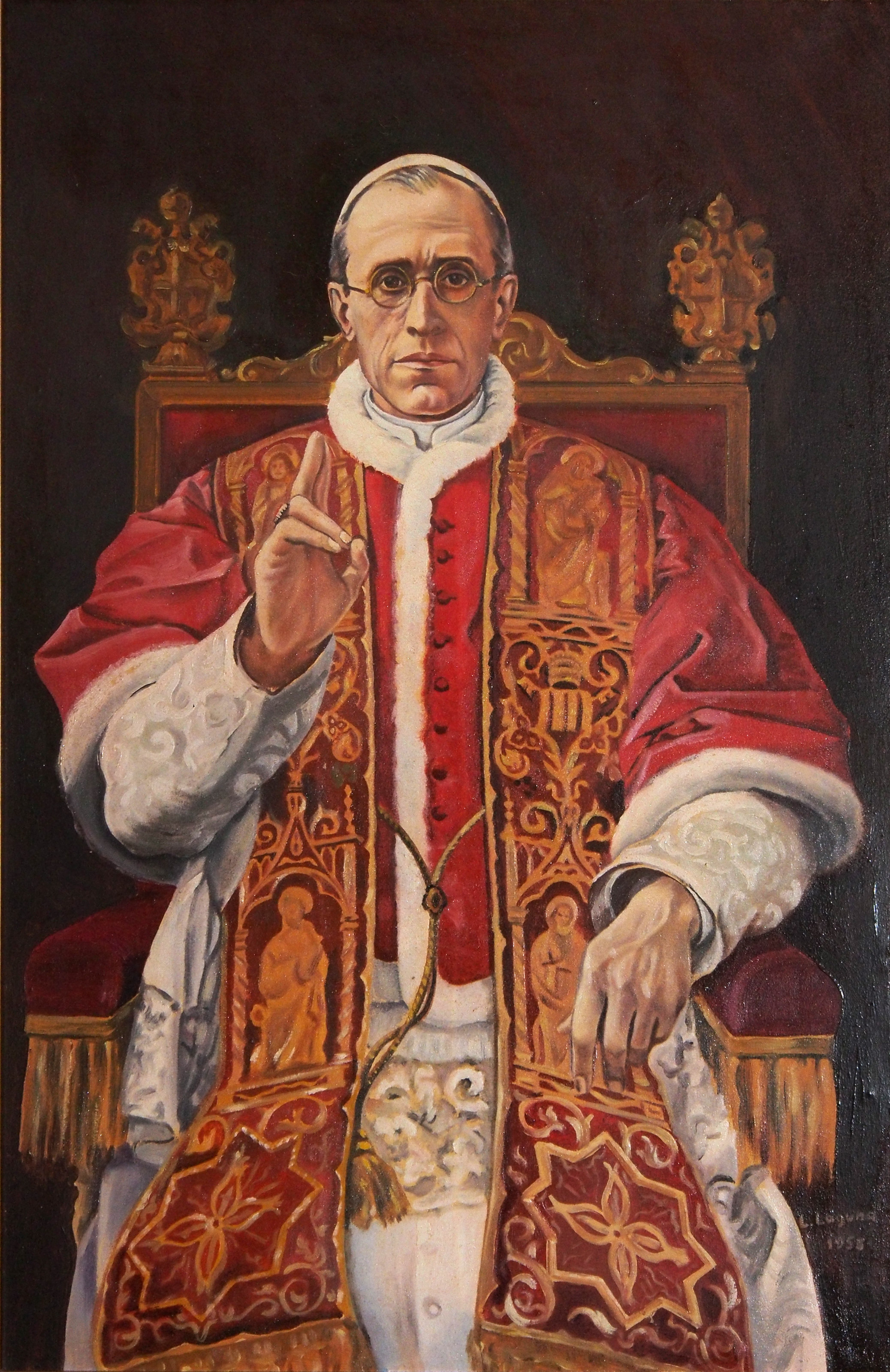
- Born: 2 March 1876
- Died: 9 October 1958 (aged 82)

Pius's cause of beatification was opened in 1965 by Paul VI during the final session of the Second Vatican Council. In 2007, the congregation recommended that Pius be declared venerable. Pope Benedict XVI did so in 2009, simultaneously making the same declaration in regard to John Paul II.

For Venerable status, the Congregation for the Causes of Saints certifies the "heroic virtues" of the candidate. Entitling Pius as Venerable met with various responses, most centered on his words and actions during World War II. Benedict's signature on the decree of heroic virtue was regarded by some as a public relations blunder, though acceptance of Pius as a saviour of Europe's Jews is regarded as 'proof of fidelity to the Church, the pope and the Tradition' by neoconservative Catholic groups. Rabbi Marvin Hier, founder and dean of the Simon Wiesenthal Center, said "there would be a great distortion of history" if Pius were canonized. Rabbi Jeremy Lawrence, the head of Sydney's Great Synagogue, said, "How can one venerate a man who... seemed to give his passive permission to the Nazis as the Jews were prised from his doorstep in Rome?"

In 2013, an anonymous "source who works for the Congregation for the Causes of Saints" said Pope Francis was considering canonization without a miracle, "us[ing] the formula of scientia certa". Francis also announced his intention, in January 2014, of opening the Vatican Secret Archives to scholars so that an evaluation of Pius' role in the war could be made before beatification. This was met with praise by the Jewish community. However, it was said that it could take up to a year to gather all the documents and analyze them.

In May 2014, Francis stated that Pius would not be beatified because the cause had stalled. Francis stated that he checked the progress of the cause for Pius and said that there were no miracles attributed to his intercession, which was the main reason that the cause had halted.

Father Peter Gumpel stated, in a 2016 documentary on Pius, that there was consultation of the Vatican Secret Archives which were carried out in secret; in short, it means that there are no controversies surrounding the late pontiff that could impede the potential beatification. In that same documentary, the cause's vice-postulator Marc Lindeijer stated that several miracles attributed to the late pope are reported to the postulation every year but the individuals related to the healings do not come forward to enact diocesan proceedings of investigation. Lindeijer explained that this was the reason that the cause has stalled in the past as none have come forward to assist the postulation in their investigations.

=== Potential miracle ===
Reports from 2014 posit a potential miracle in the United States attributed to the intercession of the late pope that was reported to the postulation. The miracle pertains to a male plagued with severe influenza and pneumonia that could have proven to be fatal; the individual was said to have been healed in full after a novena to Pius.

== Views, interpretations and scholarship ==
=== Contemporary ===
During the war, Time credited Pius and the Catholic Church for "fighting totalitarianism more knowingly, devoutly and authoritatively, and for a longer time, than any other organised power". During the war he was also praised editorially by The New York Times for opposing Nazi antisemitism and aggression. Historian Susan Zuccotti, on the other hand, has written that The New York Times

was not only badly informed, but was extremely anxious during the war to avoid any appearance of being anti-Catholic. Its editors as well as those of many Jewish publications seem to have hoped that by flattering and thanking the pope, they could persuade him to do more to help the Jews.

According to Paul O'Shea, "The Nazis demonised the Pope as the agent of international Jewry; the Americans and British were continually frustrated because he would not condemn Nazi aggression; and the Russians accused him of being an agent of Fascism and the Nazis."

On 21 September 1945, the general secretary of the World Jewish Congress, Aryeh Leon Kubowitzki, presented an amount of money to Pius "in recognition of the work of the Holy See in rescuing Jews from Fascist and Nazi persecutions." After the war, in the autumn of 1945, Harry Greenstein from Baltimore, a close friend of Chief Rabbi Herzog of Jerusalem, told Pius how grateful Jews were for all he had done for them. "My only regret", Pius replied, "is not to have been able to save a greater number of Jews".

Pius was also criticised during his lifetime. Leon Poliakov wrote in 1950 that Pius XII had been a tacit supporter of Vichy France's antisemitic laws, calling him "less forthright" than Pius XI, either out of Germanophilia or the hope that Hitler would defeat Communist Russia. British ambassador to the Vatican D'Arcy Osborne called Pius's official policy of not taking sides during WWII "the abnegation of moral leadership in the interests of a strict neutrality," and in his private diary wrote, "But is there not a moral issue at stake which does not admit or neutrality?" Osborne later commented,

It may perhaps be objected that His Holiness has already publicly denounced moral crimes arising out of the war. But such occasional declarations in general terms do not have the lasting force and validity that, in the timeless atmosphere of the Vatican, they might perhaps be expected to retain…A policy of silence in regard to such offences against the conscience of the world must necessarily involve a renunciation of moral leadership and a consequent atrophy of the influence and authority of the Vatican; and it is upon the maintenance and assertion of such authority that must depend any prospect of a Papal contribution to the reestablishment of world peace.

Kazimierz Papée, the Polish ambassador to the Vatican, after discussing Pius's 1942 Christmas address with him, wrote,

The pope is now convinced that he clearly and strongly, albeit generically, condemned German crimes in occupied countries. There lies the source of difficulties.... Pius XII... due to his sensitive and delicate nature, the character of his studies and a certain one-sidedness of his career — exclusively diplomatic and far from [real] life – cannot speak a different language and passes by the realities of our time, not realizing how little an average Catholic can understand and remember from his enunciations, isolated from facts, complex and carefully polished.

After Pius XII's death, many Jewish organisations and newspapers around the world paid tribute to him. At the United Nations, Golda Meir, Israel's Foreign Minister, said, "When fearful martyrdom came to our people in the decade of Nazi terror, the voice of the Pope was raised for the victims. The life of our times was enriched by a voice speaking out on the great moral truths above the tumult of daily conflict." The Jewish Chronicle (London) stated on 10 October, "Adherents of all creeds and parties will recall how Pius XII faced the responsibilities of his exalted office with courage and devotion. Before, during, and after the Second World War, he constantly preached the message of peace. Confronted by the monstrous cruelties of Nazism, Fascism and Communism, he repeatedly proclaimed the virtues of humanity and compassion." In the Canadian Jewish Chronicle (17 October), Rabbi J. Stern stated that Pius XII "made it possible for thousands of Jewish victims of Nazism and Fascism to be hidden away..." In 6 November edition of The Jewish Post & News in Winnipeg, William Zukerman, the former The American Hebrew columnist, wrote that no other leader "did more to help the Jews in their hour of greatest tragedy, during the Nazi occupation of Europe, than the late Pope". Other prominent Jewish figures, such as Israeli Prime Minister Moshe Sharett and Chief Rabbi Yitzhak Herzog expressed their public gratitude to Pius. Zuccotti has written, about the praise Pius received from Jewish leaders,

We must also keep in mind that after the war, leaders of the Jewish community desperately wanted certain things from the pope. They hoped that he would issue a condemnation of anti-Semitism that would discourage a resurgence of that deadly scourge. (He never did so, even after some 1,500 Jewish survivors returning to their villages in Poland were murdered in local pogroms.) They desired Vatican recognition of the state of Israel. And they looked forward to sweeping changes in Church teachings about Jews in the declarations of Vatican II from 1962 to 1965. Given these additional motives, the objective of preserving historical truth was unfortunately sometimes overlooked. A glance at the credentials of the Jewish authors of two of the most influential (and inaccurate) postwar defenses of the pope will clarify this point. The first, Joseph Lichten, was a Polish-born diplomat who served in the embassy of the Polish government in exile in Washington during the war. In 1945, he joined the Anti-Defamation League of B’nai B’rith in New York as director of the agency’s Intercultural Affairs Department, devoting himself to the improvement of Catholic–Jewish dialogue. His profoundly erroneous article ‘Pius XII and the Jews’ was published in the ADL Bulletin in October 1958 and in The Catholic Mind in March–April 1959. An equally distorted article, ‘A question of judgment’, first appeared in 1963, at the time of the second Vatican Council. The second author, Pinchas Lapide, fought in Italy with the Jewish Brigade. In the 1960s, he was the Israeli consul in Italy and was, like Lichten, deeply interested in the Jewish clauses then being considered at the sessions of the Vatican Council. His book Three Popes and the Jews was published in 1967. Even more committed than these two authors was Golda Meir, Foreign Minister of Israel at the time of Pius XII’s death in 1958. On that occasion, she paid a much-repeated, glowing tribute to him.... But... Pius XII did not ‘raise his voice’ for the Jews in any significant public way during the war. Meir could not have believed what she said.

=== Early historical accounts ===
Some early works, including Polish historian Oskar Halecki's Pius XII: Eugenio Pacelli: Pope of peace (1954) and Nazareno Padellaro's Portrait of Pius XII (1949), provided favorable accounts of Pius. Pinchas Lapide, a Jewish theologian and Israeli diplomat to Milan in the 1960s, estimated in Three Popes and the Jews that Pius "was instrumental in saving at least 700,000 but probably as many as 860,000 Jews from certain death at Nazi hands," a figure Lapide reached by "deducting all reasonable claims of rescue" by non-Catholics from the total number of European Jews surviving the Holocaust. Some historians have questioned Lapide's calculation. Catholic scholar Kevin J. Madigan has interpreted this and other praise from Jewish leaders, including that offered by Golda Meir, as less than sincere, an attempt to secure Vatican recognition of the State of Israel.

=== The Deputy ===
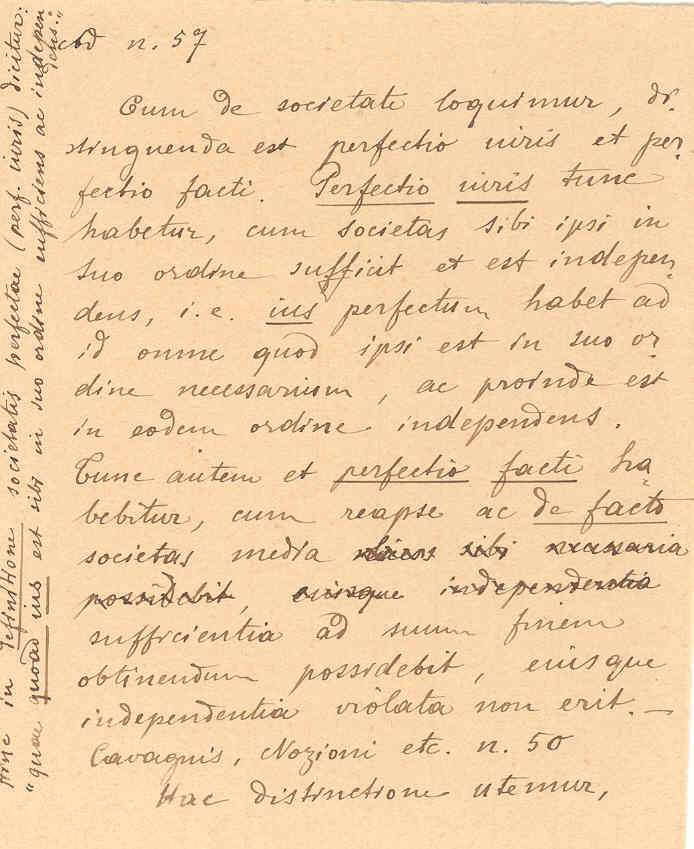
A rare 1899 handwriting sample of Eugenio Pacelli with text in Latin

In 1963, Rolf Hochhuth's drama Der Stellvertreter. Ein christliches Trauerspiel (The Deputy, a Christian tragedy, released in English in 1964) portrayed Pius as a hypocrite who remained silent about the Holocaust. The depiction is described by St. John's University professor of history Frank S. Coppa, in his Encyclopædia Britannica article about Pius, as lacking "credible substantiation." Books such as Joseph Lichten's A Question of Judgment (1963), written in response to The Deputy, defended Pius's actions during the war. Lichten labeled any criticism of the Pope's actions during World War II as "a stupefying paradox" and said, "no one who reads the record of Pius XII's actions on behalf of Jews can subscribe to Hochhuth's accusation". Critical scholarly works like Guenter Lewy's The Catholic Church and Nazi Germany (1964) also followed the publication of The Deputy. Lewy's conclusion was that "the Pope and his advisers—influenced by the long tradition of moderate anti-Semitism so widely accepted in Vatican circles—did not view the plight of the Jews with a real sense of urgency and moral outrage. For this assertion no documentation is possible, but it is a conclusion difficult to avoid". In 2002 the play was adapted into the film, Amen. A 2009 article in La Civilità Cattolica asserted that the accusations that Hochhuth's play made widely known originated not among Jews but in the Communist bloc, stating that it was on Moscow Radio, in June 1945, that the first accusation directly against Pius for refusing to speak out against the exterminations in Nazi concentration camps was made, and that it was also the first medium to call him "Hitler's Pope". The former high-ranking Securitate General Ion Mihai Pacepa alleged in 2007 that Hochhuth's play and numerous publications attacking Pius as a Nazi sympathizer were fabrications that were part of a KGB and Eastern Bloc secret services disinformation campaign, named Seat 12, to discredit the moral authority of the Church and Christianity in the West. Pacepa indicated that he was involved in contacting Eastern Bloc agents close to the Vatican in order to fabricate the story to be used for the attack against Pius.

=== Actes ===
In 1964, in the aftermath of the controversy surrounding The Deputy, Paul VI authorized Jesuit scholars to access the Vatican State Secretariat Archives, which are normally not opened for seventy-five years. Original documents in French and Italian, Actes et documents du Saint Siège relatifs à la Seconde Guerre Mondiale, were published in eleven volumes between 1965 and 1981. Pierre Blet also published a summary of the eleven volumes.

=== Hitler's Pope and The Myth of Hitler's Pope ===
In 1999 the British author John Cornwell's Hitler's Pope criticised Pius for his actions and inactions during the Holocaust. Cornwell argued that Pius subordinated opposition to the Nazis to his goal of increasing and centralising the power of the papacy. Cornwell further accused Pius of antisemitism. The Encyclopædia Britannica article authored by Frank S. Coppa, a professor at Catholic St. John's University, described Cornwell's depiction of Pius as anti-Semitic as lacking "credible substantiation". Catholic writer Kenneth L. Woodward stated in his review in Newsweek that "errors of fact and ignorance of context appear on almost every page". Paul O'Shea summarized the work by saying it was "disappointing because of its many inaccuracies, selective use of sources, and claims that do not bear any scrutiny. However, [Cornwell] has rendered a service by insisting Pacelli be re-examined thoroughly and placed firmly within the context of his times". Five years after the publication of Hitler's Pope, Cornwell stated: "I would now argue, in the light of the debates and evidence following Hitler's Pope, that Pius XII had so little scope of action that it is impossible to judge the motives for his silence during the war, while Rome was under the heel of Mussolini and later occupied by Germany".

Cornwell's work was the first to have access to testimonies from Pius's beatification process as well as to many documents from Pacelli's nunciature which had just been opened under the 75-year rule by the Vatican State Secretary archives. Susan Zuccotti's Under His Very Windows: The Vatican and the Holocaust in Italy (2000) and Michael Phayer's The Catholic Church and the Holocaust, 1930–1965 (2000) and Pius XII, The Holocaust, and the Cold War (2008) provided further critical analysis of Pius's legacy. Daniel Goldhagen's A Moral Reckoning and David Kertzer's The Pope Against the Jews denounced Pius, while Ralph McInery and José Sanchez wrote less critical assessments of his pontificate.

In specific riposte to Cornwell's criticism, American rabbi and historian David Dalin published The Myth of Hitler's Pope: How Pope Pius XII Rescued Jews from the Nazis in 2005. He reaffirmed previous accounts of Pius having been a saviour of thousands of Europe's Jews. In a review of the book, another Jewish scholar, the Churchill biographer Martin Gilbert, wrote that Dalin's work was "an essential contribution to our understanding of the reality of Pope Pius XII's support for Jews at their time of greatest danger. Hopefully, his account will replace the divisively harmful version of papal neglect, and even collaboration, that has held the field for far too long". Dalin's book also argued that Cornwell and others were liberal Catholics and ex-Catholics who "exploit the tragedy of the Jewish people during the Holocaust to foster their own political agenda of forcing changes on the Catholic Church today" and that Pius XII was responsible for saving the lives of many thousands of Jews.

A number of other scholars replied with favourable accounts of Pius, including Margherita Marchione's Yours Is a Precious Witness: Memoirs of Jews and Catholics in Wartime Italy (1997), Pope Pius XII: Architect for Peace (2000) and Consensus and Controversy: Defending Pope Pius XII (2002); Pierre Blet's Pius XII and the Second World War, According to the Archives of the Vatican (1999); and Ronald J. Rychlak's Hitler, the War and the Pope (2000). Ecclesiastical historian William Doino (author of The Pius War: Responses to the Critics of Pius XII), concluded that Pius was "emphatically not silent". Other works challenging the negative characterization of Pius's legacy were written by Eamon Duffy, Clifford Longley, Cardinal Winning, Michael Burleigh, Paul Johnson, and Denis Mack Smith.

In his 2003 book A Moral Reckoning, Daniel Goldhagen asserted that Pius XII "chose again and again not to mention the Jews publicly.... [In] public statements by Pius XII... any mention of the Jews is conspicuously absent." In a review of Goldhagen's book, Mark Riebling counters that Pius used the word "Jew" in his first encyclical, Summi Pontificatus, published in October 1939. "There Pius insisted that all human beings be treated charitably—for, as Paul had written to the Colossians, in God's eyes "there is neither Gentile nor Jew". In saying this, the Pope affirmed that Jews were full members of the human community—which is Goldhagen's own criterion for establishing 'dissent from the anti-Semitic creed'."

In Pius XII, the Hound of Hitler, the Catholic journalist Gerard Noel dismissed accusations that Pius was "anti-semitic" or "pro-Nazi", but accused him of "silence" based on fear of retaliation and wrote that "Hitler played the Pope with consummate expertise". Ian Kershaw came to a similar conclusion about Pius's motives. He suggested that besides seeking to protect his own church and parishioners, Pius feared that speaking out would worsen the plight of the Jews, though he could have hardly made it worse after 1942. Kershaw called the 1942 Christmas message "a missed opportunity", adding: "Having decided to refer to the genocide, Pius ought to have followed this with a condemnation that was loud, plain and unequivocal." However, he doubted that condemnation from the Pope would have led to Nazi Germany changing course.

Gerald Steinacher's Nazis on the Run accused Pius of turning a blind eye to the activities of Vatican priests assisting "denazification through conversion", which he said helped ex-Nazi anti-communists to escape justice.

A Berlin Jewish couple, Mr. and Mrs. Wolfsson, argued in defence of the pope: "None of us wanted the Pope to take an open stand. We were all fugitives, and fugitives do not wish to be pointed at. The Gestapo would have become more excited and would have intensified its inquisitions. If the Pope had protested, Rome would have become the center of attention. It was better that the Pope said nothing. We all shared this opinion at the time, and this is still our conviction today." There were examples when the Catholic Church reaction to Nazi brutality only intensified SS persecutions of both Jews and the church.

=== International Catholic–Jewish Historical Commission ===
In 1999, in an attempt to address some of this controversy, the International Catholic–Jewish Historical Commission (Historical Commission), a group of three Catholic and three Jewish scholars was appointed, respectively, by the Holy See's Commission for Religious Relations with the Jews (Holy See's Commission) and the International Jewish Committee for Interreligious Consultations (IJCIC), to whom a preliminary report was issued in October 2000.

The Commission did not discover any documents, but had the agreed-upon task to review the existing Vatican volumes, that make up the Actes et Documents du Saint Siège (ADSS) The commission was internally divided over the question of access to additional documents from the Holy See, access to the news media by individual commission members, and, questions to be raised in the preliminary report. It was agreed to include all 47 individual questions by the six members, and use them as Preliminary Report. In addition to the 47 questions, the commission issued no findings of its own. It stated that it was not their task to sit in judgment of the Pope and his advisors but to contribute to a more nuanced understanding of the papacy during the Holocaust.

The 47 questions by the six scholars were grouped into three parts: (a) 27 specific questions on existing documents, mostly asking for background and additional information such as drafts of the encyclical Mit brennender Sorge, which was largely written by Eugenio Pacelli. (b) Fourteen questions dealt with themes of individual volumes, such as the question how Pius viewed the role of the church during the war. (c) Six general questions, such as the absence of any anti-communist sentiments in the documents. The disagreement between members over additional documents locked up under the Holy See's 70-year rule resulted in a discontinuation of the commission in 2001 on friendly terms. Unsatisfied with the findings, Michael Marrus, one of the three Jewish members of the commission, said the commission "ran up against a brick wall .... It would have been really helpful to have had support from the Holy See on this issue."

Peter Stanford, a Catholic journalist and writer, wrote, regarding Fatal Silence: The Pope, the Resistance and the German Occupation of Rome (written by Robert Katz; Weidenfeld & Nicolson, 2003):

[The Vatican] still refuses to open all its files from the period—which seems to me to be a conclusive admission of guilt—but Katz has winkled various papers out of God's business address on earth to add to the stash of new information he has uncovered in America in the archives of the Office of Strategic Services. From this we learn that, although Pius's defenders still say that he paid a golden ransom in a vain effort to save Rome's Jews from transportation to the death camps, the most he did was indicate a willingness to chip in if the Jews could not raise the sum demanded. He also shows that no individual Jews were spared, as is often claimed, after Pius personally intervened with the Nazis. Moreover, Katz reveals that those who did escape the Nazi round-up and found sanctuary in church buildings in Rome did so in the face of explicit opposition from the Vatican. The real heroes and heroines were the priests and nuns who refused to bow to Pius's officials and hand over the desperate people whom they were hiding. The main problem with writing about Pius's wartime is that in effect, he did nothing. Facing the murders of six million people, he remained silent. As Jews were taken away from the ghetto that sat right alongside St Peter's, he may have agonised, but he did not intervene. When he did raise his voice with the German occupiers, it was either to ensure that the Vatican City state would not be compromised—that is to say, he would be safe—or to emphasise his own neutrality in a conflict which, for many, became a battle between good and evil. His unrealistic hope was that the Catholic Church could emerge as the peacemaker across Europe. Instead, both the American and British leaderships, as Katz shows, regarded the papacy as tainted by its association with Nazism and irrelevant in the post-1945 reshaping of the continent. Both had urged Pius to speak up against the Holocaust and so drew their own conclusions about him. Far from being a saint, then, he was at best a fool, perhaps an anti-Semite and probably a coward.

Katz's book also discusses how the Pope's view of the anti-Nazi resistance—as harbingers of Communism—meant he chose not to intervene in the Ardeatine massacre.

=== 2000s–2020s developments ===
In The Real Odessa: How Peron Brought the Nazi War Criminals to Argentina (2002), the journalist Uki Goñi described how the Argentinian government dealt with war criminals. However, during his research Goñi accidentally stumbled on British Foreign Office documents relating to the involvement of Vatican personnel in the smuggling of war criminals, the so-called post-war "ratlines". Goñi found out that the British Envoy D'Arcy Osborne had intervened with Pius to put an end to these illegal activities. Furthermore, he claimed "that the Pope secretly pleaded with Washington and London on behalf of notorious criminals and Nazi collaborators". Suzanne Brown-Fleming's The Holocaust and Catholic Conscience: Cardinal Aloisius Muench and the Guilt Question in Germany (2006) underlines Goñi's findings. Brown-Fleming stated that Pius allegedly intervened on behalf of German war criminals (e.g. Otto Ohlendorf). Brown-Fleming's main source was the archive of Pius's representative in post-war Germany, Cardinal Aloisius Joseph Muench. Phayer's Pius XII, the Holocaust, and the Cold War (2008) utilized documents that were released via Bill Clinton's 1997 executive order declassifying wartime and postwar documents, many of which are currently at the US National Archives and Holocaust Memorial Museum. These documents include diplomatic correspondence, American espionage, and decryptions of German communications. Relevant documents have also been released by the Argentine government and the British Foreign Office. Other information sources have become available, including the diary of Bishop Joseph Patrick Hurley. These documents reveal new information about Pius's actions regarding the Ustaše regime, the genocides in Poland, the finances of the wartime church, the deportation of the Roman Jews, and the ratlines for Nazis and fascists fleeing Europe. According to Phayer, "the face of Pope Pius that we see in these documents is not the same face we see in the eleven volumes the Vatican published of World War II documents, a collection which, though valuable, is nonetheless critically flawed because of its many omissions."

On 19 September 2008, Benedict XVI held a reception for conference participants during which he praised Pius as a pope who made every effort to save Jews during the war. A second conference was held from 6–8 November 2008 by the Pontifical Academy of Life. On 9 October 2008, the 50th anniversary of Pius's death, Benedict XVI celebrated pontifical Mass in his memory. Shortly before and after the Mass, dialectics continued between the Jewish hierarchy and the Vatican as Rabbi She'ar Yashuv Cohen of Haifa addressed the Synod of Bishops and expressed his disappointment towards Pius's "silence" during the war. In June 2009, the Pave the Way Foundation announced that it would release 2,300 pages of documents in Avellino, Italy, dating from 1940 to 1945, which the organisation claims show that Pius "worked diligently to save Jews from Nazi tyranny"; the organisation's founder, Krupp, has accused historians of harboring "private agendas" and having "let down" the public. The foundation's research led to the publication of the book Pope Pius XII and World War II: the documented truth, authored by Krupp; the book reproduces 225 pages of the new documents produced by the foundation's research. Mark Riebling argued in his 2015 book Church of Spies that Pius was involved in plots to overthrow Hitler from mid-October 1939 and was prepared to mediate a peace between the Allies and the Axis in the event of a regime change in Germany. The courier between the resistance group under Admiral Wilhelm Canaris and the pope was the Bavarian lawyer and Catholic politician Joseph Müller.

=== Opening of the Vatican Secret Archives ===
On the occasion of the 80th anniversary of the appointment of Pius XII as Bishop of Rome, Pope Francis announced during an audience for staff of the Vatican Secret Archives on 4 March 2019 that Vatican archival materials pertaining to Pius's pontificate would be accessible to scholars beginning on 2 March 2020. While this announcement was welcome by researchers, much of it was clouded by the role of Pius with regard to the Holocaust; However, archival research of this period was expected to inform a much broader shift within global Christianity, from Europe to the global South. The Vatican archives have provided many millions of pages and it was expected to take many years to process the findings. As of May 2021, the study of the archive had been inconclusive. In January 2022, historian Michael F. Feldkamp announced that he had discovered in the Vatican archives evidence that Pius had personally saved at least 15,000 Jews from extermination, and that he had sent a report on the Holocaust to the American government shortly after the Wannsee Conference of January 20, 1942, although they did not believe the pope.

In June 2022, David Kertzer, one of the first historians to have analyzed the archives, published his book The Pope at War. Kertzer, with the support of thousands of unpublished documents, uncovered the existence of secret negotiations between Hitler and Pius already a few weeks after the end of the conclave, promoted by Hitler himself with the intention of improving his relations with the Vatican. For his part, Pius concentrated his efforts on protecting and improving the situation of the Church in Germany in the face of the anti-Catholic policies of the Nazis, although no agreement was reached. In September 2023, Corriere della Sera published newly discovered documentation from the Vatican Secret Archive showing that a German Jesuit had informed the Pope of the Holocaust.

On a different topic, the archives have also alleged that Pius had knowledge of Marcial Maciel's accusations of crimes, including sexual abuse of seminarians and drug abuse, decades before action was taken. The Vatican may have known of Maciel's crimes for 50 years.

== See also ==
- List of people from Rome
- List of popes
- List of saints canonized by Pope Pius XII
- List of encyclicals of Pope Pius XII
- Pius XII Memorial Library
- Pius Wars
- Operation Seat 12

== Bibliography ==
- Besier, Gerhard. 2007. The Holy See and Hitler's Germany. Palgrave Macmillan. ISBN 1403988315
- Bokenkotter, Thomas. 2004. A Concise History of the Catholic Church. Doubleday. ISBN 0-385-50584-1
- Brown-Fleming, Suzanne. 2006. The Holocaust and Catholic Conscience. Cardinal Aloisius Muench and the Guilt Question in Germany. University of Notre Dame Press: Notre Dame, Indiana
- Chadwick, Owen. 1995. A History of Christianity. Barnes & Noble. ISBN 0-7607-7332-7
- Coppa, Frank J. The Life and Pontificate of Pope Pius XII: Between History and Controversy (Catholic University of America Press; 2013) 306 pages; scholarly biography
- Coppa, Frank J. The Policies and Politics of Pope Pius XII: Between Diplomacy and Morality (New York etc., Peter Lang, 2011).
- Cornwell, John. 1999. Hitler's Pope: The Secret History of Pius XII. Viking. ISBN 0-670-87620-8.
- Cushing, Richard. 1959. Pope Pius XII. Paulist Press.
- Dalin, David G. 2005. The Myth of Hitler's Pope: How Pope Pius XII Rescued Jews from the Nazis. Regnery. ISBN 0-89526-034-4.
- Falconi, Carlo. 1970 (translated from the 1965 Italian edition). The Silence of Pius XII. Boston: Little, Brown, and Co. ISBN 0-571-09147-4
- Feldkamp, Michael F. Pius XII und Deutschland. Göttingen: Vandenhoeck & Ruprecht. ISBN 3-525-34026-5.
- Friedländer, Saul. 1966. Pius XII and the Third Reich: A Documentation. New York: Alfred A Knopf. ISBN 0-374-92930-0
- Gallo, Patrick J., ed. 2006. Pius XII, The Holocaust and the Revisionists. London: McFarland & Company, Inc., Publishers. ISBN 0-7864-2374-9
- Goldhagen, Daniel. 2002. A Moral Reckoning: The Role of the Catholic Church in the Holocaust and Its Unfulfilled Duty of Repair. Little, Brown ISBN 0-316-72446-7
- Goñi, Uki. 2003 (revised edition). The Real Odessa. How Peron Brought the Nazi War Criminals to Argentina. London-New York: Granta Books
- Gutman, Israel (ed.). 1990. Encyclopedia of the Holocaust, vol. 3. New York: Macmillan Publishing Company. ISBN 0-02-864529-4
- Halecki, Oskar. 1954. Pius XII: Eugenio Pacelli: Pope of peace. Farrar, Straus and Young. OCLC 775305
- Hatch, Alden, and Walshe, Seamus. 1958. Crown of Glory, The Life of Pope Pius XII. New York: Hawthorne Books.
- ICJHC. 2000. The Vatican and the Holocaust: A Preliminary Report.
- Kent, Peter. 2002. The Lonely Cold War of Pope Pius XII: The Roman Catholic Church and the Division of Europe, 1943–1950. Ithaca: McGill-Queen's University Press. ISBN 0-7735-2326-X
- Kertzer, David. 2022. The Pope at War. The Secret History of Pius XII, Mussolini and Hitler. Random House. ISBN 0812989945
- Kühlwein, Klaus. 2008. Warum der Papst schwieg. Pius XII und der Holocaust. Düsseldorf: Patoms-Verlag. ISBN 978-3-491-72527-0
- Kühlwein, Klaus. 2013. Pius XII und die Judenrazzia in Rom. Berlin: epubli-Verlag. ISBN 978-3-8442-7035-8
- Kurzman, Dan. 2007. A Special Mission: Hitler's Secret Plot to Seize the Vatican and Kidnap Pope Pius XII. Da Capo Press.
- Leiber, Robert. Pius XII Stimmen der Zeit, Freiburg i Br. Vol 163, 1958–1959, pp. 81 ff
- Lehnert, Pascalina. 1983. Ich durfte Ihm dienen, Erinneringen an Papst Pius XII, Würzburg, Verlag Johann Wolhelm Naumann
- Lapide, Pinchas. 1967. Three Popes and the Jews. London and Southampton: Souvenir Press.
- Levillain, Philippe (ed.). 2002. The Papacy: An Encyclopedia. Routledge (UK). ISBN 0-415-92228-3.
- Lewy, Guenter. 1964. The Catholic Church and Nazi Germany. New York: McGraw-Hill. ISBN 0-306-80931-1.
- Mallory, Marilyn. 2012. Pope Pius XII and the Jews: What's True and What's Fiction?. Amazon.com. Kindle. ASIN: B006KLOARW.
- Marchione Sr. Margherita. 2000. Pope Pius XII: Architect for Peace. Paulist Press. ISBN 0-8091-3912-X.
- Marchione Sr. Margherita. 2002. Consensus and Controversy: Defending Pope Pius XII. Paulist Press. ISBN 0-8091-4083-7.
- Marchione Sr. Margherita. 2002. Shepherd of Souls: A Pictorial Life of Pope Pius XII. Paulist Press. ISBN 0-8091-4181-7.
- Marchione Sr. Margherita. 2004. Man of Peace: An Abridged Life of Pope Pius XII. Paulist Press. ISBN 0-8091-4245-7.
- Martin, Malachi B. 1972. Three Popes and the Cardinal: The Church of Pius, John and Paul in its Encounter with Human History. Farrar, Straus and Giroux. ISBN 0-374-27675-7.
- McDermott, Thomas. 1946. Keeper of the Keys -A Life of Pope Pius XII. Milwaukee: The Bruce Publishing Company.
- McInerny, Ralph. 2001. The Defamation of Pius XII. St Augustine's Press. ISBN 1-890318-66-3.
- Morsey, Rudolf. 1986. "Eugenio Pacelli als Nuntius in Deutschland" in Herbert Schambeck, Pius XII. Berlin: Duncker & Humblot.
- Murphy, Paul I. and Arlington, R. Rene. 1983. La Popessa: The Controversial Biography of Sister Pascalina, the Most Powerful Woman in Vatican History. New York: Warner Books Inc. ISBN 0-446-51258-3.
- Noel, Gerard. 2008. Pius XII: The Hound of Hitler. ISBN 1-84706-355-1.
- (in Italian) Padellaro, Nazareno. 1949. Portrait of Pius XII. Dutton; 1st American ed edition (1957). OCLC 981254
- O'Brien, Felicity. 2000, Pius XII, London and Bristol, Burleigh Press,
- O'Shea, Paul. 2011, A Cross Too Heavy, Palgrave Macmillan ISBN 0-230-11080-0.
- Passelecq, Georges and Bernard Suchecky, 1997. The hidden encyclical of Pius XI. Harcourt Brace. ISBN 9780151002443
- Paul, Leon. 1957. The Vatican Picture Book: A Picture Pilgrimage. New York: Greystone Press.
- Pham, John Peter. 2006. Heirs of the Fisherman: Behind the Scenes of Papal Death and Succession. Oxford University Press. ISBN 0-19-517834-3
- Phayer, Michael. 2000. The Catholic Church and the Holocaust, 1930–1965. Indianapolis: Indiana University Press. ISBN 0-253-33725-9.
- Phayer, Michael. 2008. Pius XII, The Holocaust, and the Cold War. Indianapolis: Indiana University Press. ISBN 978-0-253-34930-9.
- Pollard, John F. 2005. Money and the Rise of the Modern Papacy: Financing the Vatican, 1850–1950. Cambridge University Press.
- Pfister, Pierre. 1955. PIUS XII: The Life and Work of a Great Pope. New York: Thomas Y. Crowell Company.
- Rhodes, Anthony. 1973. The Vatican in the Age of the Dictators (1922–1945). Hodder + Stoughton 1973 ISBN 0340023945
- Riebling, Mark. 2015. Church of Spies: The Pope's Secret War Against Hitler. Basic Books. ISBN 978-0-465-02229-8. ISBN 0465022294.
- Ritner, Carol and Roth, John K. (eds.). 2002. Pope Pius XII and the Holocaust. New York: Leicester University Press. ISBN 0-7185-0275-2.
- Rychlak, Ronald J. 2000. Hitler, the War, and the Pope. Our Sunday Visitor. ISBN 0-87973-217-2.
- Rota, Olivier. Les 'silences' du pape Pie XII: genèse et critique d'un procès biaisé, in Revue d'Histoire Ecclésiastique, Louvain, vol. 99 (3–4), hul.–dec. 2004, pp. 758–766.
- Sánchez, José M. 2002. Pius XII and the Holocaust: Understanding the Controversy. Washington, D.C.: Catholic University of America Press. ISBN 0-8132-1081-X.
- Scholder, Klaus. 1987. The Churches and the Third Reich. London.
- Tardini, Domenico. 1960. Pio XII. Roma: Poliglotta Vaticana.
- John Vidmar. 2005. The Catholic Church Through the Ages. Paulist Press. ISBN 0-8091-4234-1.
- Volk, Ludwig. 1972. Das Reichskonkordat vom 20. Juli 1933. Mainz: Matthias-Grünewald-Verlag. ISBN 3-7867-0383-3.
- Wolf, Hubert. 2012 (reprint). Pope and Devil. Harvard University Press. ISBN 0674064267
- Zolli, Israel. 1997. Before the Dawn. Roman Catholic Books (Reprint edition). ISBN 0-912141-46-8.
- Zuccotti, Susan. 2000. Under His Very Windows: The Vatican and the Holocaust in Italy. New Haven and London: Yale University Press. ISBN 0-300-08487-0.

=== Primary sources ===
- Acta Apostolicae Sedis (AAS). 1939–1958. Vatican City.
- Angelini, Fiorenzo. 1959. Pio XII, Discorsi Ai Medici (in Italian). Rome.
- Claudia, M. 1955. Guide to the Documents of Pope Pius XII. Westminster, Maryland.
- Pio XII, Discorsi e Radio Messaggi di Sua Santita Pio XII. 1939–1958. Vatican City. 20 vol.
- Roosevelt, Franklin D.; Myron C. Taylor, ed. Wartime Correspondence Between President Roosevelt and Pope Pius XII. Prefaces by Pius XII and Harry Truman. Kessinger Publishing (1947, reprinted, 2005). ISBN 1-4191-6654-9
- Utz, A. F., and Gröner, J. F. (eds.). Soziale Summe Pius XII (in German); 3 vol.

Catholic Church titles
Preceded by Giuseppe Aversa	Titular Archbishop of Sardes; 23 April 1917 – 16 December 1929	Succeeded by Arthur Hinsley
Preceded by Giuseppe Francica-Nava de Bontifè	Cardinal-Priest of Santi Giovanni e Paolo al Celio; 19 December 1929 – 2 March 1939	Succeeded by Francis Joseph Spellman
Preceded by Rafael Merry del Val	Archpriest of St. Peter's Basilica; 25 March 1930 – 2 March 1939	Succeeded by Federico Tedeschini
Preceded by Pietro Gasparri	Cardinal Secretary of State; 9 February 1930 – 10 February 1939	Succeeded by Luigi Maglione
Preceded by Lorenzo Lauri	Camerlengo of the Sacred College of Cardinals; 1937 – 2 March 1939	Succeeded by Federico Tedeschini
Preceded by Pius XI	Grand Master of the Order of the Holy Sepulchre; 2 March 1939 – 16 July 1940	Succeeded by Nicola Canali
Preceded by Pius XI	Pope; 2 March 1939 – 9 October 1958	Succeeded by John XXIII
