= Pope Pius XII's 1942 Christmas address =

Speech denouncing racial extermination

Pope Pius XII in 1942, the year he delivered the address in which he denounced racial extermination

Pope Pius XII's 1942 Christmas address was a speech delivered by Pope Pius XII over Vatican Radio on Christmas 1942. Towards the end of the lengthy speech occurs the sentence, "Mankind owes that vow to the hundreds of thousands of persons who, without any fault on their part, sometimes only because of their nationality or race, have been consigned to death or to a slow decline." These words, delivered as they were during a time of war and of widespread killing of non-combatants – including the mass slaughter of Europe's Jews, of which Pius had been aware for over a year – have been and continue to be the focus of debate.

== Background ==
The 1942 Christmas Address by Pope Pius XII was made shortly after the war had turned decisively against Nazi Germany. Hitler had broken his alliance with Joseph Stalin and advanced into the Soviet Union, although his army in Stalingrad had been surrounded, decimated, starved and was about to surrender, precipitating disaster on the Eastern Front. Following decisive victories in North Africa, the Pacific and the air war in Northern Europe, the war had turned in favour of the Allies. The Nazis' industrialized slaughter of the Jews of Europe, the Final Solution was underway, as was the brutalization of the Catholic Church in Poland.

The Catholic Church had offered condemnations of Nazi racism since the earliest days of the Nazi movement. The 1942 Christmas address is significant for the light it sheds on the ongoing scholarly debate around the wartime policies of Pius XII in response to The Holocaust (the systematic murder of Europe's Jews by the Nazis). Pius' cautious approach has been a subject of controversy. According to the Encyclopædia Britannica, his "strongest statement against genocide was regarded as inadequate by the Allies, though in Germany he was regarded as an Allied sympathizer who had violated his own policy of neutrality". Father Jean Bernard of Luxembourg, who was sent to Dachau in May 1941 and freed in August 1942, recounted instances of the treatment of clergy imprisoned in the Priest Barracks of Dachau Concentration Camp worsening when Pius or the German bishops were critical of Hitler or the Nazis.

Two Popes reigned through the Nazi period: Pope Pius XI (1922–1939) and Pope Pius XII (1939–1958). In 1933, the future Pius XII, Vatican Secretary of State Cardinal Eugenio Pacelli, signed a Concordat with Germany, which he hoped would protect the right to practice Catholicism under the Nazi government. Hitler commented, "The concordat gives Germany an opportunity and creates an area of trust that is particularly significant in the developing struggle against international Jewry." The terms of the treaty were not kept by Hitler. According to the Encyclopædia Britannica: "From 1933 to 1936 [Pius XI] wrote several protests against the Third Reich, and his attitude toward fascist Italy changed dramatically after Nazi racial policies were introduced into Italy in 1938." Pius XI delivered three papal encyclicals challenging the new totalitarian creeds from a Catholic perspective: against Italian Fascism Non abbiamo bisogno (1931; "We Do Not Need to Acquaint You"); against Nazism Mit brennender Sorge (1937; "With Deep Anxiety") and against atheistic Communism Divini redemptoris (1937; "Divine Redeemer"). He also challenged the extremist nationalism of the Action Francaise movement and anti-Semitism in the United States.

As Secretary of State, Pacelli, who helped Pius XI draft Mit Brennender Sorge, made some 55 protests against Nazi policies, including its "ideology of race". Pius XI also commissioned an encyclical demonstrating the incompatibility of Catholicism and racism: Humani generis unitas ("The Unity of the Human Race"). Following his death however, Pacelli, now Pius XII, did not issue the encyclical.

When Pius XI died on 10 February 1939, the Nazi government was exceptional in not sending a representative to Pius XII's coronation. Pius, a cautious diplomat, pursued the course of diplomacy to attempt to convince European leaders to avoid war.

Following the outbreak of war, Pius followed Vatican precedent and pursued a policy of "impartiality". Despite this official policy, Pius passed intelligence to the Allies and made a series of general condemnations of racism and genocide through the course of the war, and chose diplomacy to assist the persecuted during the war. For this he was scorned by Hitler as a "Jew lover" and a blackmailer on his back, who he believed constricted his ally Mussolini and leaked confidential German correspondence to the world.

Pius's response to Nazism and to the extermination of two-thirds of Europe's Jews has the subject of debate and controversy, sometimes termed the Pius wars. Frank J. Coppa, history professor at St. John's University, writing in the Encyclopædia Britannica, articulated his view that depictions of the Pope as anti-Semitic or indifferent to the Nazi Holocaust lack "credible substantiation". Upon the death of Pius XII in 1958, he was praised by world leaders for his wartime leadership, with the Israeli Foreign Minister Golda Meir saying: "When fearful martyrdom came to our people in the decade of Nazi terror, the voice of the Pope was raised for the victims. The life of our times was enriched by a voice speaking out on the great moral truths above the tumult of daily conflict. We mourn a great servant of peace."

One scholarly critic of the legacy of Pius XII has been Michael Phayer (author of The Church and the Holocaust, 1930–1965 (2000)). He has written that the Catholic Church possessed a specific knowledge of the Holocaust that rivaled that of the Allied governments. The Vatican possessed information on the systematic nature of deportations and atrocities, compiled from its own diplomatic corps in Eastern Europe, from Catholic bishops in Germany, the Netherlands, and Eastern Europe, from ordinary Catholics, priests, and laity, from the Polish government-in-exile, the foreign diplomats to the Holy See, and various Jews and Jewish organizations. A variety of historians have comprehensively examined the data received by the Vatican, which "covered not just the activity of mobile killing squads but every aspect of the Nazis' murdering process". However, according to Phayer, until 1942, Cardinal Secretary of State Luigi Maglione had repeatedly and publicly stated that the Vatican was "unable to confirm atrocity reports". Phayer wrote: "regarding Maglione's oft-repeated rejoinder to the effect that something could not be confirmed, he never took steps to confirm the many reports of atrocities that flowed to his office. Had Pope Pius wished to do so, he could have assembled a comprehensive picture of the genocidal crimes of the Nazis." Messages to the effect that the pope was losing his "moral authority" due to the failure to condemn Nazi atrocities poured in from diplomats accredited to the Vatican from the United States, Great Britain, Switzerland, Brazil, Uruguay, Peru, Cuba, Belgium, and Poland. Moreover, the Allies condemned the genocide of the Jews on 17 December 1942 in the Joint Declaration by Members of the United Nations, which – according to Phayer – "must have sent the Holy See scurrying to play catch-up". Pius XII refused to endorse the Joint Declaration, as urged by Harold Tittmann, his US ambassador, and indeed, his own speech would be "not as bluntly stated as the United Nations' declaration earlier that month".

A defender of Pius, the historian Martin Gilbert, portrays Vatican policy in the lead up to the 1942 Christmas message with a very different emphasis: "In his first encyclical as Pope, Pius XII specifically rejected Nazism and expressly mentioned the Jews, noting that in the Catholic Church there is "neither Gentile nor Jew, circumcision nor uncircumcision." The head of the Gestapo, Heinrich Mueller, commented that the encyclical was "directed exclusively against Germany." So outspoken was it that the Royal Air Force and the French air force dropped 88,000 copies of it over Germany. One strong piece of evidence that Dalin produces against the concept of "Hitler's Pope" is the audience granted by Pius XII in March 1940 to the German Foreign Minister, Joachim von Ribbentrop, the only senior Nazi official to visit the Vatican during his papacy. After Ribbentrop rebuked the Pope for "siding" with the Allies, the Pope responded by reading from a long list of German atrocities and religious persecution against Christians and Jews, in Germany and in Poland which Germany had occupied six months earlier. The New York Times, under the headline "JEWS' RIGHTS DEFENDED," wrote on 14 March 1940: "The Pontiff, in the burning words he spoke to Herr Ribbentrop about religious persecution, also came to the defense of the Jews in Germany and Poland."

== Content ==
The 1942 Christmas address was 26 pages and over 5000 words long and took more than 45 minutes to deliver. The majority of the speech spoke in general terms about human rights and civil society. According to Rittner and Roth, "always one to choose words carefully, Pius wrote several drafts before he had crafted exactly what he wanted to say on that particular Christmas Eve". Phayer wrote that the speech was "crafted to fit the circumstances as he saw them – that is to say, he addressed principles and omitted particulars". Speaking on the 50th anniversary of Pius' death in 2008, the German Pope Benedict XVI recalled that the Pope's voice had been "broken by emotion" as he "deplored the situation" with a "clear reference to the deportation and extermination of the Jews."

The Pope addressed the issues of racial persecutions in the following terms:

Humanity owes this vow to those hundreds of thousands who, without any fault on their part, sometimes only because of their nationality or race, have been consigned to death or to a slow decline [also translated: "marked down for death or gradual extinction"].

Rittner and Roth described these as the "pivotal words that remain one of the key flashpoints in the Holocaust-related controversy that continues to swirl around him", and came near the end of the speech. Phayer, Rittner and Roth see it as significant that Pius did not address the perpetrators or victims by name. Nor did he mention Jews or antisemitism.

== Contemporary reception ==
Phayer has written that the immediate reaction to the speech was generally positive, with the exception of the Nazis and Jewish victims in Poland, and that diplomatic criticism of the Vatican's "moral authority" essentially ceased until the deportations of the Italian Jews began in 1943. A New York Times editorial called Pius a "lonely voice crying out of the silence of a continent". (Note: The editorial's rhetoric mimics another New York Times editorial about Pius XII's previous Christmas address, which called the pope "a lonely voice in the silence and darkness enveloping Europe this Christmas" in 1941.) Phayer's survey of global news sources states that every paper that covered the speech did so in a positive light, although none of them considered it front-page news. U.S. representative to the Vatican Harold Tittmann pressured Pius in their diplomatic meetings to go further in his public statements, but privately wired the State Department that "taken as a whole, the message may be regarded as an arraignment of totalitarianism. Furthermore, the reference to the persecution of the Jews and mass deportations is unmistakeable." Tittmann also wrote, on the other hand, "The message does not satisfy those circles which had hoped that the Pope would this time call a spade a spade and discard his usual practice of speaking in generalities."

The initial response of Francis D'Arcy-Osborne, the British ambassador to the Vatican, to the speech was dismissive. "He has produced the inevitable Five Points this year on the special social problem or social problems." After discussing the speech with the pope, Osborne reported, "To me he claimed that he had condemned the Jewish persecution. I could not dissent from this, though the condemnation is inferential and not specific, and comes at the end of a long dissertation on social problems." Osborne further commented, "While the address strikes me as being the most effective of the Pope's recent pronouncements, it suffers from the usual defect of exorbitant length and from the fact that... his teachings are weakened by the oratorical flux in which they are invariably enveloped."

American Jesuit Vincent McCormick, the former rector of Pontifical Gregorian University, in a discussion with Pius's advisor Robert Leiber, described the pope's speech as having been "much too heavy, ideas not clean-cut, and obscurely expressed."

Kazimierz Papée, the Polish ambassador to the Vatican, who met with Pius several days after the speech, wrote, "The pope is now convinced that he clearly and strongly, albeit generically, condemned German crimes in occupied countries. There lies the source of difficulties.... Pius XII... due to his sensitive and delicate nature, the character of his studies and a certain one-sidedness of his career - exclusively diplomatic and far from [real] life - cannot speak a different language and passes by the realities of our time, not realizing how little an average Catholic can understand and remember from his enunciations, isolated from facts, complex and carefully polished."

The speech elicited the strongest reaction in the Dutch Catholic Church. Archbishop of Utrecht, Johannes de Jong, saw the address as a signal for Catholics to publicly confront Nazism. A later pastoral letter from the Dutch bishops stated they were "following a path indicated by our Holy Father, the Pope" and quoted the address: "The Church would be untrue to herself, ceasing to be a mother, if she turned a deaf ear to children's anguished cries." However, unlike the Christmas address, the Dutch letter went farther and "named names".

Others were more guarded in their reactions. Bishop Konrad von Preysing of Berlin agreed that the address referred to Jews, but considered it not specific enough. Catholic Poles believed that the address referred to them alone and wished that the pope had identified the Germans as the perpetrators. The Polish government-in-exile in London remained dissatisfied with the address, wishing for a "more trenchant papal condemnation" that named the perpetrators.

The German government expressed displeasure at the Christmas address and boycotted the pope's Christmas Eve liturgy. According to Pinchas Lapide's Three Popes and the Jews, on 27 December 1942 the Prague department of the RSHA reported the following about the Christmas broadcast, that "the Pope has repudiated the National-Socialist New European Order. ...He is virtually accusing the German people of injustice toward the Jews and makes himself the mouthpiece of the Jewish war criminals." However, Phayer states that he attempted to assuage the German ambassador, Diego von Bergen, by pulling him aside and assuring him that his remarks were intended for the Soviets and Stalin rather than the Germans.

Phayer argues that contemporaries and scholars have viewed the speech differently because "we know that the pope would not take up the matter again, but contemporaries did not know that this would be the case. In fact, to assert that Pope Pius himself intended this to be his one and only statement is incorrect."

== Scholarly interpretation ==
According to Rittner and Roth, the speech remains a "lightning rod in debates about Pius XII and the Holocaust", and its interpretation remains "unsettled and unsettling".

To the historian Martin Gilbert, the Reich Security Main Office calling Pius a "mouthpiece" of the Jews in response to his Christmas address, is clear evidence that Pius was one who raised his voice for the victims of Nazi terror. This is a view shared by rabbi and historian David G. Dalin (author of The Myth of Hitler's Pope: How Pope Pius XII Rescued Jews From the Nazis).

Phayer agrees that the 1942 speech did denounce genocide, but argues that "it is still not clear whose genocide or which genocide he was referring to, and we can do no more than speculate as to why he spoke out". Phayer states that "although the word genocide would not be coined until 1944, Pius XII denounced what we now commonly understand as genocide". In 2000, Phayer wrote that "Pope Pius's radio talk contained twenty-seven words about the Holocaust out of twenty-six pages of text". While Phayer's views of the speech changed between 2000 and 2008 ("Pius did speak out"), his dismal assessment of the "Vatican's essential passivity in collecting and disseminating genocide information" did not. Phayer states that his change of views came after he was invited by Michael Marrus to participate in a University of Toronto conference about the Holocaust and the Netherlands. Phayer cites the address as evidence of the "adaptability rather than uniform rigidity at the Vatican in the middle of the Holocaust years. The Holy See was in search of a new path for papal policy". He argues that historians (himself included) have been "too dismissive of the 1942 address" although he agrees that "Pius never spoke out again".

== See also ==
- Catholic resistance to Nazi Germany
- Pope Pius XII and the German resistance
- Rescue of Jews by Catholics during the Holocaust
