= Rescue of Jews by Catholics during the Holocaust =

During the Holocaust, members of the Catholic Church were involved in rescuing Jews from persecution in Nazi Germany. They lobbied Axis officials, provided false documents, and hid people in monasteries, convents, schools, with sympathetic families, and within the institutions of the Vatican itself. Members of the Catholic Church saved hundreds of thousands of Jews; Israeli diplomat and historian Pinchas Lapide estimated the number saved to be between 700,000 and 860,000.

The Catholic Church itself faced persecution in Nazi Germany. Institutional German Catholic resistance to Nazism centred largely on defending the Church's own rights and institutions. Broader resistance tended to be fragmented and led by individual efforts within Germany, but priests played a part in rescuing Jews in all countries under German occupation. Aiding Jews was met with severe consequences and many rescuers and would-be rescuers were killed, such as Saint Maximilian Kolbe.

Pope Pius XII's actions during the Holocaust are still a topic of much debate; some say he stayed quiet as Jews were being killed in large numbers, while others believe he secretly helped victims through diplomatic efforts and secret actions.

== Overview ==
In the prelude to the Holocaust, Popes Pius XI and XII preached against racism and war in encyclicals such as Mit brennender Sorge (1937) and Summi Pontificatus (1939). Pius XI condemned Nazi racial ideology in general, rejecting claims of racial superiority and emphasizing that there was only 'a single human race'. His successor, Pius XII, employed diplomatic measures to aid the Jews and directed the Catholic Church to provide discreet assistance. However, he faced criticism for his perceived silence during the Holocaust, including incidents such as the Nazi-perpetrated murder of Polish priests in 1939. Various Polish officials and members of the government-in-exile criticized the Pope in 1942 for his failure to speak out on behalf of the suffering Polish population. While Pius XII engaged in diplomatic efforts during the war, his public condemnations of the mass killing of civilians were often indirect, framed within broader humanitarian or theological contexts. For example, in his 1942 Christmas radio address, he denounced the murder of "hundreds of thousands" of innocent people on the basis of "nationality or race," and he intervened by attempting to block Nazi deportations of Jews in various countries. The indirect nature of this condemnation has been a subject of historical debate.

Catholic bishops in Germany sometimes spoke out on human rights issues, but protests against anti-Jewish policies were often limited to private lobbying of government ministers. After Pius XII's 1943 Mystici corporis Christi encyclical (which condemned the killing of the disabled amid the ongoing Nazi euthanasia program), a joint declaration from the German bishops denounced the killing of "innocent and defenseless mentally handicapped, incurably infirm and fatally wounded, innocent hostages, and disarmed prisoners of war and criminal offenders, and people of a foreign race or descent". Resistor active in rescuing Jews included priests Bernard Lichtenberg, Alfred Delp, Maximilian Kolbe, as well as laywomen Gertrud Luckner and Margarete Sommer. They used Catholic agencies to aid German Jews, under the protection of Bishops such as Konrad von Preysing.

In Italy, the popes lobbied Mussolini against anti-Semitic policies, while Vatican diplomats, among them Giuseppe Burzio in Slovakia, Filippo Bernardini in Switzerland, and Giuseppe Angelo Roncalli in Turkey, rescued thousands. The apostolic nuncio to Budapest, Angelo Rotta, and to Bucharest, Andrea Cassulo, have been recognized as Righteous Among the Nations by Yad Vashem. The Church played an important role in the defense of Jews in Belgium, France, and the Netherlands, encouraged by the public protests and statements of leaders such as Cardinal Jozef-Ernest van Roey, Archbishop Jules-Géraud Saliège, and Johannes de Jong. From his Vatican office, Monsignor Hugh O'Flaherty operated an escape network for Jews and Allied escapees. Priests and nuns of orders like the Jesuits, Franciscans, and Benedictines hid children in monasteries, convents, and schools. Margit Slachta's Hungarian Social Service Sisterhood saved thousands. In Poland, the Żegota organization also rescued thousands, and Mother Matylda Getter's Franciscan Sisters sheltered hundreds of Jewish children who escaped the Warsaw Ghetto. In France, Belgium, and Italy, Catholic underground networks were particularly active and saved thousands of Jews, particularly in Central Italy where groups like the Assisi Network were active, and in Southern France.

== The Third Reich ==
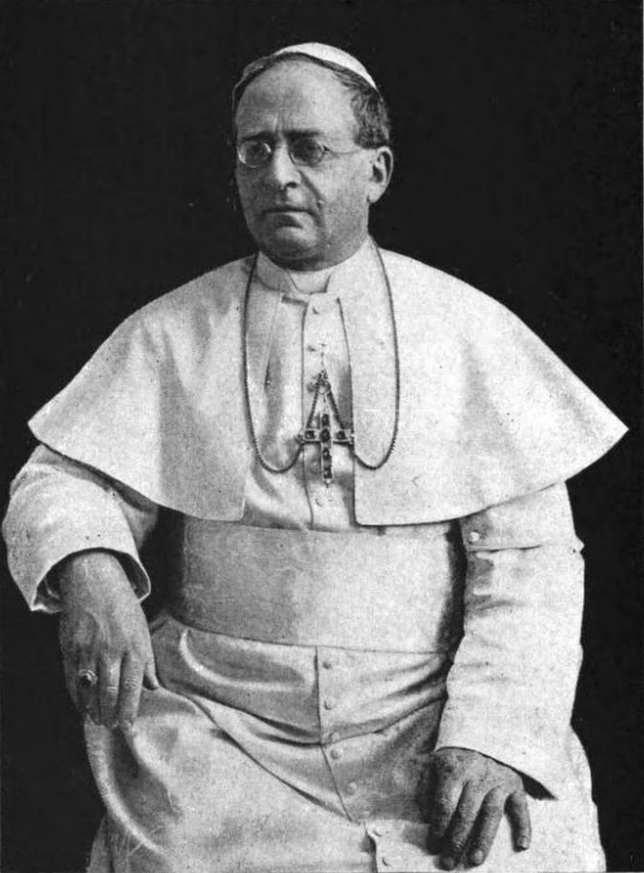
Pope Pius XI faced the rise of Hitler

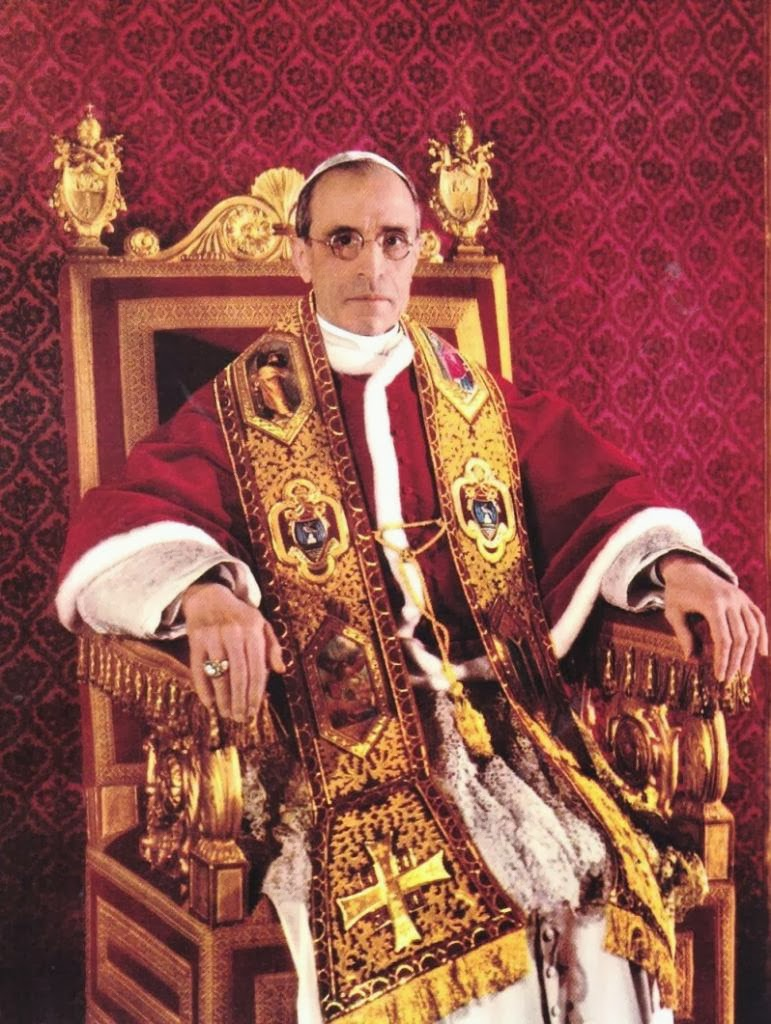
Pope Pius XII held the position during World War II

While the Catholic Church in Germany was one of the few organizations that offered organized, systematic resistance to some policies of the Third Reich, the considerable energies expended by the German church in opposing government interference in the church were not matched in public by protests against the anti-Jewish policies of the regime. According to Ian Kershaw, while the "detestation of Nazism was overwhelming within the Catholic Church", traditional Christian anti-Judaism was "no bulwark" against Nazi biological antisemitism. The Church in Germany was itself facing Nazi persecution. German bishops feared protests against the anti-Jewish policies of the regime would invite retaliation against Catholics. Such protests as were made tended to be private letters to government ministers.

The relationship of the Church to Jews had a complex history of cooperation and conflict, entailing both suspicion and respect. The Jews and Christians were rivals, sometimes enemies, for a long period of history. Furthermore, Christians traditionally blamed Jewish leaders for the crucifixion of Christ. At the same time, Christians showed devotion and respect. They were conscious of their debt to the Jews, as Jesus and all the disciples and all the authors of the gospels were of the Jewish race. Christians viewed the Old Testament, the holy book of the synagogues, as equally a holy book for them...".

Hamerow writes that sympathy for the Jews was common among Catholics in the German Resistance, who saw both Catholics and Jews as religious minorities exposed to bigotry on the part of the majority. This sympathy led some lay and clergy resistors to speak publicly against the persecution of the Jews, as with the priest who wrote in a periodical in 1934 that it was a sacred task of the church to oppose "sinful racial pride and blind hatred of the Jews". The leadership of the Catholic Church in Germany, however, was generally hesitant to speak out specifically on behalf of the Jews. Church resistance to the Holocaust in Germany was generally left to fragmented and largely individual efforts. German bishops such as Konrad von Preysing and Joseph Frings were notable exceptions for the energy and consistency of their criticism of the government's treatment of Jews.

Cardinal Michael von Faulhaber gained an early reputation as a critic of the Nazi movement. Soon after the Nazi takeover, his three Advent sermons of 1933, entitled Judaism, Christianity, and Germany, affirmed the Jewish origins of the Christian religion, the continuity of the Old and New Testaments of the Bible, and the importance of the Christian tradition to Germany. Though Faulhaber's words were cautiously framed as a discussion of historical Judaism, his sermons denounced the Nazi extremists who were calling for the Bible to be purged of the "Jewish" Old Testament as a grave threat to Christianity: in seeking to adhere to the central tenet of Nazism, "The anti-Semitic zealots..." wrote Hamerow, were undermining "the basis of Catholicism. Neither accommodation, nor acquiescence was possible any longer; the cardinal had to face the enemy head on." During the 1938 Kristallnacht pogrom, Faulhaber supplied a truck to rabbi of the Ohel Yaakov Synagogue, to rescue sacred objects before the building was torn down. Following mass demonstrations against Jews and Catholics, a Nazi mob attacked Faulhaber's palace and smashed its windows.

The Bishop of Munster, August von Galen, though a German conservative and nationalist, criticized Nazi racial policy in a sermon in January 1934, and in subsequent homilies spoke against Hitler's theory of the purity of German blood. When in 1933, the Nazi school superintendent of Munster issued a decree that religious instruction be combined with discussion of the "demoralizing power" of the "people of Israel", Galen refused, writing that such interference in curriculum was a breach of the Reich concordat and that he feared children would be confused as to their "obligation to act with charity to all men" and as to the historical mission of the people of Israel. In 1941, with the Wehrmacht still marching on Moscow, Galen denounced the lawlessness of the Gestapo and the cruel program of Nazi euthanasia and went further than just defending the church by speaking of a moral danger to Germany from the regime's violations of basic human rights: "the right to life, to inviolability, and to freedom is an indispensable part of any moral social order", he said - and any government that punishes without court proceedings "undermines its own authority and respect for its sovereignty within the conscience of its citizens".

=== Response to Kristallnacht and increasing brutality ===
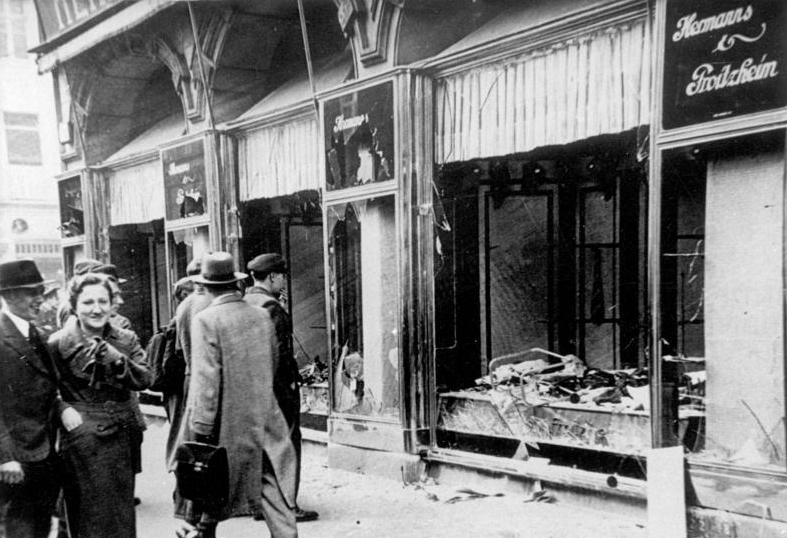
Kristallnacht, shop damage in Magdeburg. Pope Pius XI joined Western leaders in condemning the pogrom. In response, the Nazis organised mass demonstrations against Catholics and Jews in Munich.

On 11 November 1938, following Kristallnacht, Pope Pius XI joined Western leaders in condemning the pogrom. In response, the Nazis organized mass demonstrations against Catholics and Jews in Munich, and the Bavarian Gauleiter Adolf Wagner declared before 5,000 protesters: "Every utterance the Pope makes in Rome is an incitement of the Jews throughout the world to agitate against Germany". A Nazi mob attacked Cardinal Faulhaber's palace and smashed its windows. On 21 November, in an address to the world's Catholics, the Pope rejected the Nazi claim of racial superiority, and insisted instead that there was only a single human race. Robert Ley, the Nazi Minister of Labour declared the following day in Vienna: "No compassion will be tolerated for the Jews. We deny the Pope's statement that there is but one human race. The Jews are parasites." Catholic leaders including Cardinal Schuster of Milan, Cardinal van Roey in Belgium and Cardinal Verdier in Paris backed the Pope's strong condemnation of Kristallnacht. At his Berlin Cathedral, Fr. Bernhard Lichtenberg closed each evening service with a prayer "for the Jews, and the poor prisoners in the Concentration camps."

From 1934, forced sterilization of the hereditarily diseased had commenced in Germany. Based on eugenic theories, it proposed to cleanse the German nation of "unhealthy breeding stock" and was taken a step further in 1939, when the regime commenced its "euthanasia." This was the first of the regime's infamous series of mass extermination programs, which saw the Nazis attempt to eliminate "life unworthy of life" from Europe: first the handicapped, then Jews, Gypsies, homosexuals, Jehovah's Witnesses, and others deemed "subnormal". Ultimately, the Jews suffered most in numerical terms, while Gypsies suffered the greatest proportional loss. The Jews later termed the tragedy The Holocaust (or Shoah).

Hitler's order for the T4 Euthanasia Program was dated 1 September, the day Germany invaded Poland. As word of the program spread, protest grew, until finally, Bishop August von Galen delivered his famous 1941 sermons denouncing the program as "murder." Thousands of copies of the sermons were circulated across Germany. Galen denounced the regime's violations of basic human rights: "the right to life, to inviolability, and to freedom is an indispensable part of any moral social order," he said - and any government that punishes without court proceedings "undermines its own authority and respect for its sovereignty within the conscience of its citizens." The words had profound resonance for the mass extermination programs yet to come, and forced the euthanasia program underground. Unlike the Nazi euthanasia murder of invalids, which the church led protests against, the Final Solution liquidation of the Jews did not primarily take place on German soil, but rather in Polish territory. Awareness of the murderous campaign was therefore less widespread. Such protests as were made by the Catholic bishops in Germany regarding anti-Semitic policies of the regime, tended to be by way of private letters to government ministers. But the Church had already rejected the racial ideology.

The Nazi Concentration Camps had been established in 1933, as political prisons, but it was not until the invasion of Russia that the death camps opened, and techniques learned in the aborted euthanasia program were transported to the East for the racial exterminations. The process of gassing commenced in December 1941. During the pontificate of Pope John Paul II, the Catholic Church reflected on the Holocaust in We Remember: A Reflection on the Shoah (1998). The document acknowledged a negative history of "long-standing sentiments of mistrust and hostility that we call anti-Judaism" from many Christians towards Jews, but distinguished these from the racial antisemitism of the Nazis:

[T]heories began to appear which denied the unity of the human race, affirming an original diversity of races. In the 20th century, National Socialism in Germany used these ideas as a pseudo-scientific basis for a distinction between so called Nordic-Aryan races and supposedly inferior races. Furthermore, an extremist form of nationalism was heightened in Germany by the defeat of 1918 and the demanding conditions imposed by the victors, with the consequence that many saw in National Socialism a solution to their country's problems and cooperated politically with this movement. The Church in Germany replied by condemning racism.

— From We Remember: A Reflection on the Shoah (1998)

=== Vatican diplomacy in Germany ===
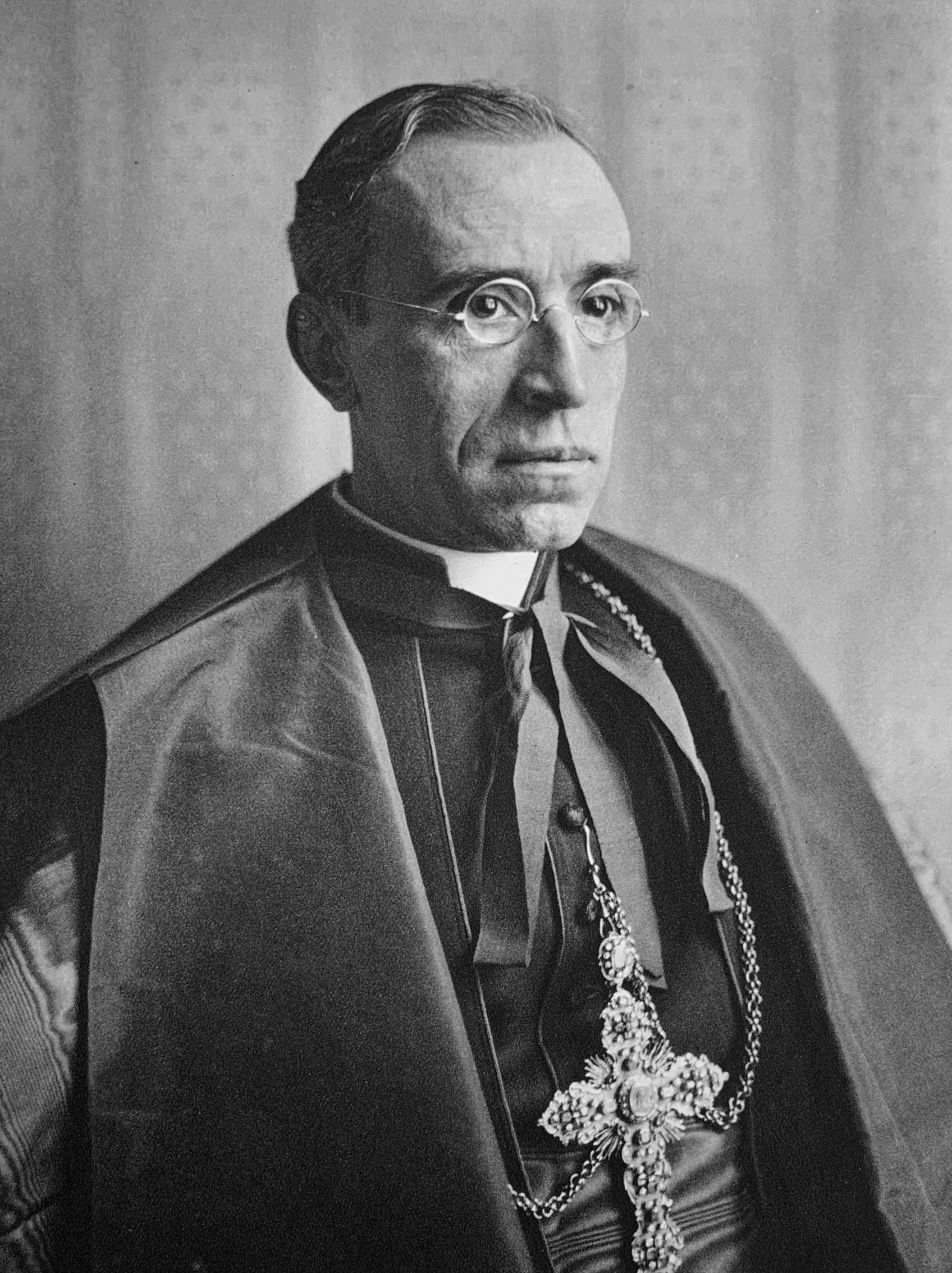
Eugenio Pacelli (later Pope Pius XII) served as Pius XI's diplomatic representative in Germany (1917–1929) and then as Vatican Secretary of State (1929–1939), during which period he delivered multiple denunciations of Nazi racial ideology.

Eugenio Pacelli (later Pope Pius XII) served as Pius XI's diplomatic representative in Germany (1917–1929) and then as Vatican Secretary of State (1929–1939), during which period he delivered multiple denunciations of Nazi racial ideology. As Secretary of State, Pacelli made some 55 protests against Nazi policies, including its "ideology of race". As the newly installed Nazi Government began to instigate its program of anti-antisemitism, Pope Pius XI, through Cardinal Pacelli, who was by then serving as Vatican Secretary of State, ordered the successor Papal Nuncio in Berlin, Cesare Orsenigo, to "look into whether and how it may be possible to become involved" in their aid. Orsenigo generally proved a poor instrument in this regard, concerned more with the anti-church policies of the Nazis and how these might affect German Catholics, than with taking action to help German Jews. In the assessment of historian Michael Phayer, Orsenigo did intervene on behalf of the Jews, but only seldom, and apart from his attempt to halt a plan to "resettle" Jews married to Christians, when directed by the Holy See to protest against mistreatment of Jews, he did so "timidly".

The 1937 papal anti-Nazi encyclical Mit brennender Sorge was part drafted by Pacelli as Vatican Secretary of State. It repudiated Nazi racial theory and the "so-called myth of race and blood". Pacelli became Pope in 1939, and told Vatican officials that he intended to reserve the all-important handling of diplomacy with Germany for himself. He issued Summi Pontificatus with spoke of the equality of races, and of Jew and Gentile. Following a 21 June 1943 Vatican Radio broadcast to Germany which spoke in defense of Yugoslav Jews, Pius XII instructed the papal nuncio to Germany, Cesare Orsenigo to speak directly with Hitler about the persecution of the Jews. Orsenigo later met with Hitler at Berchtesgaden, but when the subject of the Jews was raised, Hitler reportedly turned his back and smashed a glass on the floor.

=== German Catholic efforts to save Jews in Germany ===
Mary Fulbrook wrote that when politics encroached on the church, Catholics were prepared to resist, but that the record was otherwise patchy and uneven, and that, with notable exceptions, "it seems that, for many Germans, adherence to the Christian faith proved compatible with at least passive acquiescence in, if not active support for, the Nazi dictatorship". Cardinal Bertram of Breslau, the chairman of the German Conference of Bishops, developed a protest system which "satisfied the demands of the other bishops without annoying the regime". Firmer resistance by Catholic leaders gradually reasserted itself by the individual actions of leading churchmen like Joseph Frings, Konrad von Preysing, August von Galen and Michael von Faulhaber.

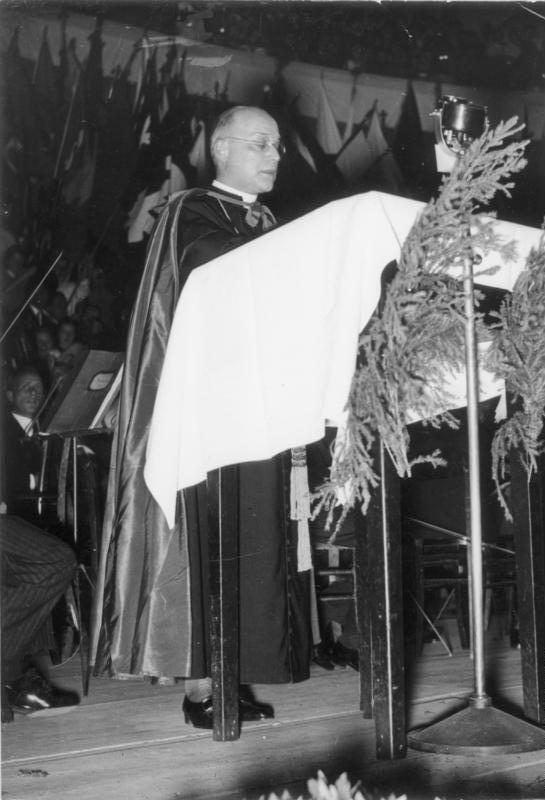
Bishop Konrad von Preysing was Bishop of Berlin, the capital city of Nazi Germany. He provided aid to the city's Jews and had links to the German Resistance.

Among the most firm and consistent of senior Catholics to oppose the Nazis was Bishop Konrad von Preysing. Preysing was appointed as Bishop of Berlin in 1935. Preysing was loathed by Hitler, who said "the foulest of carrion are those who come clothed in the cloak of humility and the foulest of these Count Preysing! What a beast!". Von Preysing opposed the appeasing attitudes of Cardinal Bertram towards the Nazis and spoke out in public sermons and argued the case for firm opposition at bishops' conferences. He also worked with leading members of the resistance Carl Goerdeler and Helmuth James Graf von Moltke. He was part of the five-member commission that prepared the papal encyclical Mit brennender Sorge anti-Nazi encyclical of March 1937. In 1938, he became one of the co-founders of the Hilfswerk beim Bischöflichen Ordinariat Berlin (Welfare Office of the Berlin Diocese Office). He extended care to both baptized and unbaptized Jews and protested the Nazi euthanasia program.

While Bishop von Preysing was protected from Nazi retaliation by his position, his cathedral administrator and confidant, Bernard Lichtenberg, was not. Fr. Bernard Lichtenberg served at St. Hedwig's Cathedral from 1932, and was under the watch of the Gestapo for his courageous support of prisoners and Jews. Lichtenberg ran Bishop von Preysing of Berlin's aid unit (the Hilfswerke beim Bischöflichen Ordinariat Berlin) which secretly provided assistance to those who were being persecuted by the regime. From the Kristallnacht pogrom of November 1938 onward, Lichtenberg closed each nightly service with a prayer for "the Jews, and the poor prisoners in the concentration camps", including "my fellow priests there". On 23 October 1942, he offered a prayer for the Jews being deported to the East, telling his congregation to extend to the Jew's the commandment of Christ to "Love thy neighbour". For preaching against Nazi propaganda and writing a letter of protest concerning Nazi euthanasia, he was arrested in 1941, sentenced to two years penal servitude, and died en route to Nachau Concentration Camp in 1943. He was subsequently honored by Yad Vashem as Righteous among the Nations.

Among the German laity, Gertrud Luckner, was among the first to sense the genocidal inclinations of the Hitler regime and to take national action. A pacifist and member of the German Catholics' Peace Association, she had been supporting victims of political persecution since 1933 and from 1938 worked at the head office of the German Association of Catholic Charitable Organizations, "Caritas". Using international contacts, she secured safe passage abroad for many refugees. She organized aid circles for Jews, assisted many to escape. She cooperated with the priests Lichtenberg and Alfred Delp. Following the outbreak of the war, she continued her work for the Jews through Caritas' war relief office - attempting to establish a national underground network through Caritas cells. She personally investigated the fate of the Jews being transported to the East and managed to obtain information on prisoners in concentration camps, and obtain clothing, food and money for forced laborers and prisoners of war. Caritas secured safe emigration for hundreds of converted Jews, but Luckner was unable to organize an effective national underground network. She was arrested in 1943 and only narrowly escaped death in the concentration camps.

Margarete Sommer had been sacked from her welfare institute for refusing to teach the Nazi line on sterilization. In 1935, she took up a position at the Episcopal Diocesan Authority in Berlin, counselling victims of racial persecution for Caritas Emergency Relief. In 1941 she became director of the Welfare Office of the Berlin Diocesan Authority, under Bernhard Lichtenberg. Following Lichtenberg's arrest, Sommer reported to Bishop Konrad von Preysing. While working for the Welfare Office, Sommer coordinated Catholic aid for victims of racial persecution - giving spiritual comfort, food, clothing, and money. She gathered intelligence on the deportations of the Jews, and living conditions in concentration camps, as well as on SS firing squads, writing several reports on these topics from 1942, including an August 1942 report which reached Rome under the title "Report on the Exodus of the Jews".

Josef Frings became Archbishop of Cologne in 1942. In his sermons, he repeatedly spoke in support of persecuted peoples and against state repression. In March 1944, Frings attacked arbitrary arrests, racial persecution and forced divorces. That autumn, he protested to the Gestapo against the deportations of Jews from Cologne and surrounds. In 1943, the German bishops had debated whether to directly confront Hitler collectively over what they knew of the murdering of Jews. Frings wrote a pastoral letter cautioning his diocese not to violate the inherent rights of others to life, even those "not of our blood" and even during war, and preached in a sermon that "no one may take the property or life of an innocent person just because he is a member of a foreign race".

== The Papacy ==
=== Pius XI and the prelude to the Holocaust ===
In the 1930s, Pope Pius XI urged Mussolini to ask Hitler to restrain the anti-Semitic actions taking place in Germany. In 1937, he issued the Mit brennender Sorge (German: "With burning concern") encyclical, in which he asserted the inviolability of human rights. It was written partly in response to the Nuremberg Laws, and condemned racial theories and the mistreatment of people based on race. It repudiated Nazi racial theory and the "so-called myth of race and blood". It denounced "whoever exalts race, or the people, or the State ... above their standard value and divinizes them to an idolatrous level"; and it defines and declares an anathema (¶33) against whoever shall do so (i.e. forever, not only the Nazis), which means a public declaration of judgement that they are "deserving to be damned and to be interred in the eternal fire" (damnatum cum diaboli cum angelus eius et interritum in ignem aeternam iudicamus), and includes excommunication and obligatory total shunning by the faithful. It spoke of divine values independent of "space country and race" and a Church for "all races"; and said "None but superficial minds could stumble into concepts of a national God, of a national religion; or attempt to lock within the frontiers of a single people, within the narrow limits of a single race, God, the Creator of the universe. The document noted on the horizon the "threatening storm clouds" of religious wars of extermination over Germany. Pius XI's Secretary of State, Cardinal Pacelli (future Pius XII), made some 55 protests against Nazi policies, including its "ideology of race".

Following the Anschluss and the extension of anti-Semitic laws in Germany, Jewish refugees sought sanctuary outside the Reich. In Rome, Pius XI told a group of Belgian pilgrims on 6 September 1938 that "It is not possible for Christians to participate in anti-Semitism. Spiritually we are Semites." Following the November Kristallnacht of that year, Pius XI condemned the pogrom, sparking mass demonstrations against Catholics and Jews in Munich, where the Bavarian Gauleiter Adolf Wagner declared: "Every utterance the Pope makes in Rome is an incitement of the Jews throughout the world to agitate against Germany". The Vatican took steps to find refuge for Jews. On 21 November, in an address to the world's Catholics, Pius XI rejected the Nazi claim of racial superiority, and insisted instead that there was only a single human race.

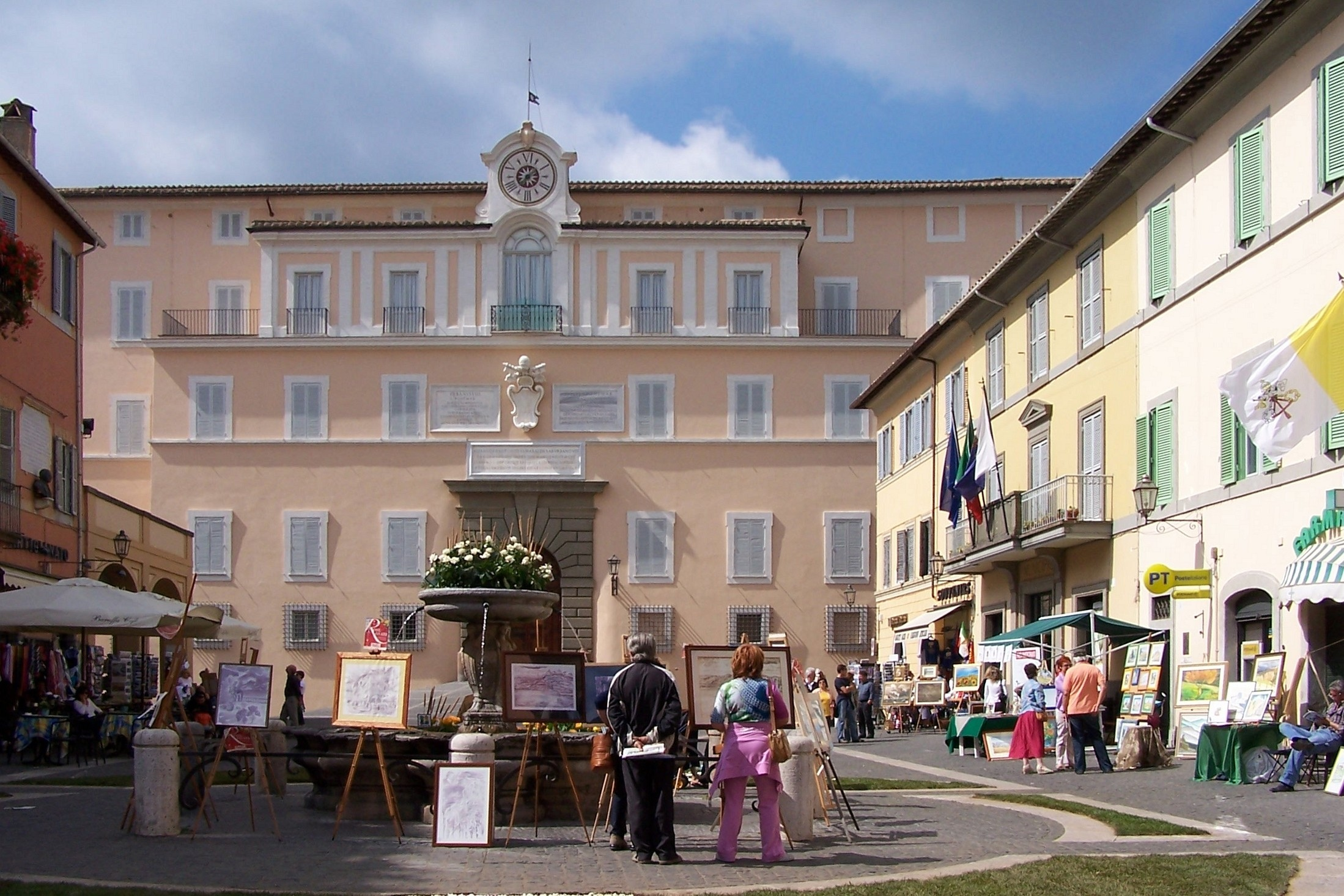
The Papal Palace of Castel Gandolfo, the Pope's summer residence, was used to shelter Jews fleeing the Nazi roundups in Italy

=== Pius XII and the war ===
Pius XII succeeded Pius XI on the eve of war in 1939. He was to employ diplomacy to aid the victims of the Holocaust and directed his Church to provide discreet aid to Jews. His encyclicals such as Summi Pontificatus and Mystici corporis spoke against racism.

==== Summi Pontificatus ====
Summi Pontificatus first papal encyclical followed the Nazi/Soviet invasion of Poland and reiterated Catholic teaching against racism and anti-Semitism and affirmed the ethical principles of the "Revelation on Sinai". Pius reiterated Church teaching on the "principle of equality" - with specific reference to Jews: "there is neither Gentile nor Jew, circumcision nor uncircumcision". The forgetting of solidarity "imposed by our common origin and by the equality of rational nature in all men" was called "pernicious error". Catholics everywhere were called upon to offer "compassion and help" to the victims of the war. The letter also decried the deaths of non-combatants. Local bishops were instructed to assist those in need. Pius went on to make a series of general condemnations of racism and genocide through the course of the war.

==== Pope's 1942 Christmas address ====
After the invasion of the Soviet Union, Nazi Germany commenced its industrialized mass murder of the Jews, around late 1941/early 1942. Pius XII employed diplomacy to aid the victims of the Holocaust, and directed his Church to provide discreet aid to Jews. At Christmas 1942, once evidence of the mass slaughter of the Jews had emerged, Pius XII voiced concern at the murder of "hundreds of thousands" of "faultless" people because of their "nationality or race" and intervened to attempt to block Nazi deportations of Jews in various countries. According to the Encyclopædia Britannica, he refused to say more "fearing that public papal denunciations might provoke the Hitler regime to brutalize further those subject to Nazi terror - as it had when Dutch bishops publicly protested earlier in the year - while jeopardizing the future of the church". Regardless, the Nazi authorities were distressed by the papal intervention. The Reich Security Main Office, responsible for the deportation of Jews, noted:

In a manner never known before, the Pope has repudiated the National Socialist New European Order... Here he is virtually accusing the German people of injustice towards the Jews and makes himself the mouthpiece of the Jewish war criminals

— Reich Security Main Office, following Pope Pius XII's 1942 Christmas address

==== Italy ====
In Italy, where the Pope's direct influence was strongest, under Mussolini, no policy of abduction of Jews had been implemented. Following the capitulation of Italy in 1943, Nazi forces invaded and occupied much of the country and began deportations of Jews to extermination camps. Pius XII protested at diplomatic levels, while several thousand Jews found refuge in Catholic networks, institutions and homes across Italy - including in the Vatican City and Pope Pius' Summer Residence. Anti-Semitism had not been a founding principle of Italian Fascism, although Mussolini's regime moved closer to Hitler with time. On 27 June 1943, Vatican Radio is reported to have broadcast a papal injunction: "He who makes a distinction between Jews and other men is being unfaithful to God and is in conflict with God's commands". In July 1943, with the Allies advancing from the south, Mussolini was overthrown, and on 1 September, the new government agreed an armistice with the Allies. The Germans occupied much of the country, commencing an effort to deport the nation's Jews.

According to Sir Martin Gilbert, when the Nazis came to Rome in search of Jews, Pius had already "A few days earlier... personally ordered the Vatican clergy to open the sanctuaries of the Vatican City to all "non-Aryans" in need of refuge. By morning of October 16, a total of 477 Jews had been given shelter in the Vatican and its enclaves, while another 4,238 had been given sanctuary in the many monasteries and convents of in Rome. Only 1,015 of Rome's 6,730 Jews were seized that morning".

The Pope had helped the Jews of Rome in September, by offering whatever amounts of gold might be needed towards the 50 kg ransom demanded by the Nazis. Upon receiving news of the roundups on the morning of 16 October, the Pope immediately instructed Cardinal Secretary of State, Cardinal Maglione, to make a protest to the German ambassador to the Vatican, Ernst von Weizsacker: "Maglione did so that morning, making it clear to the ambassador that the deportation of Jews was offensive to the Pope. In urging Weizsacker 'to try to save these innocent people,' Maglione added: 'It is sad for the Holy Father, sad beyond imagination, that here in Rome, under the very eyes of the Common Father, that so many people should suffer only because they belong to a specific race.'" Following the meeting, Weizsacker gave orders for a halt to the arrests.

Pius assisted various noted rescuers. From within the Vatican, and in co-operation with Pius XII, Monsignor Hugh O'Flaherty, ran an escape operation for Jews and Allied escapees. In 2012, the Irish Independent newspaper credited him with having saved more than 6,500 people during the war. Pietro Palazzini, an assistant vice rector in a pontifical seminary during the war, is remembered by Israel for his efforts for Italian Jews during the war. He hid Michael Tagliacozzo on Vatican property in 1943 and 1944, when the Nazis were rounding up Italian Jews and was recognized by Yad Vashem in 1985. Giovanni Ferrofino is credited with saving 10,000 Jews. Acting on secret orders from Pope Pius XII, Ferrofino obtained visas from the Portuguese Government and the Dominican Republic to secure their escape from Europe and sanctuary in the Americas. Pius provided funds to the Jewish refugees of Fiume saved by Giovanni Palatucci and to other rescue operations - to the French Capuchin Pierre-Marie Benoit of Marseille and others. When Archbishop Giovanni Montini (later Pope Paul VI) was offered an award for his rescue work by Israel, he said he had only been acting on the orders of Pius XII.

==== Direct diplomatic interventions ====
Pius XII allowed the national hierarchies of the Church to assess and respond to their local situation under Nazi rule, but himself established the Vatican Information Service to provide aid to, and information about, war refugees. He gave his blessing to the establishment of safe houses inside the Vatican and in monasteries and convents across Europe and oversaw a secret operation for priests to shelter Jews by means of fake documents - with some Jews made Vatican subjects to spare them from the Nazis. On papal instructions, 4000 Jews were hidden in Italian monasteries and convents, and 2000 Hungarian Jews given fake documents identifying them as Catholics. Pius' diplomatic representatives lobbied on behalf of Jews across Europe, including in Nazi allied Hungary, Romania, Bulgaria, Croatia and Slovakia, Vichy France and elsewhere. The papal nuncios most active in the rescue of Jews included Angelo Roncalli (the future Pope John XXIII); and Angelo Rotta, Nuncio to Budapest, who enabled many Jews to survive and was recognized as Righteous among the Nations by Yad Vashem; and Archbishop Andrea Cassulo, Nuncio in Romania, who appealed to the Antonescu regime to stop deportations of Jews, and received the same honor from Yad Vashem.

Pius protested the deportations of Slovak Jews to the Bratislava government from 1942. Giuseppe Burzio, the Apostolic Delegate to Bratislava, protested the anti-Semitic and totalitarianism of the Tiso regime.

Pius made a direct intervention in Hungary to lobby for an end to Jewish deportations in 1944, and on July 4, the Hungarian leader, Admiral Horthy, told Berlin's representative that deportations of Jews must cease, citing protests by the Vatican, the King of Sweden and the Red Cross for his decision. The pro-Nazi, anti-Semitic Arrow Cross seized power in October, and a campaign of murder of the Jews commenced. The neutral powers led a major rescue effort and Pius' representative, Angelo Rotta took the lead in establishing an "international Ghetto", around which the Swiss, Swedish, Portuguese, Spanish and Vatican legations affixed their emblems, providing shelter for some 25,000 Jews.

==== Vatican diplomats ====
Vatican neutrality through the war permitted the Holy See's network of diplomats to continue to operate throughout the occupied territories of the Nazi Empire, enabling the dissemination of intelligence back to Rome, and diplomatic interventions on behalf of the victims of the conflict. Pius' diplomatic representatives lobbied on behalf of Jews across Europe, including in Nazi allied Vichy France, Hungary, Romania, Bulgaria, Croatia and Slovakia, Germany itself and elsewhere. Many papal nuncios played important roles in the rescue of Jews, among them Giuseppe Burzio, the Vatican Chargé d'Affaires in Slovakia, Filippo Bernardini, Nuncio to Switzerland and Angelo Roncalli, the nuncio to Turkey. Angelo Rotta, the wartime Papal Nuncio to Budapest and Andrea Cassulo, the Papal Nuncio to Bucharest have been recognised as Righteous Among the Nations by Yad Vashem, Israel's Holocaust Martyrs' and Heroes' Remembrance Authority.

Vichy France

With the Nazi Empire around its full extent in late 1942, the Nazis sought to extend their roundups of Jews, and resistance began to spread. In Lyon, Cardinal Gerlier had defiantly refused to hand over Jewish children being sheltered in Catholic homes, and on 9 September, it was reported in London that Vichy French authorities had ordered the arrest of all Catholic priests sheltering Jews in the unoccupied zone. Eight Jesuits were arrested for sheltering hundreds of children on Jesuit properties, and Pius XII's Secretary of State, Cardinal Maglione informed the Vichy Ambassador to the Vatican that "the conduct of the Vichy government towards Jews and foreign refugees was a gross infraction" of the Vichy government's own principles, and "irreconcilable with the religious feelings which Marshal Petain had so often invoked in his speeches".

Croatia

Germany, Italy, Bulgaria and Hungary partitioned Yugoslavia in April 1941. In regions controlled by Italy, the Italian authorities protected Jews from Nazi roundups, as had occurred throughout Italian territory. Martin Gilbert wrote that when negotiations began for the deportation of Jews from the Italian zone, General Roatta flatly refused, leading Hitler's envoy, Siegfried Kasche, to report some of Mussolini's subordinates "apparently been influenced" by opposition in the Vatican to German anti-Semitism.

Most of Croatia fell to the new Independent State of Croatia, where Ante Pavelić's Ustaše were installed in power. Unlike Hitler, Pavelic was pro-Catholic, but their ideologies overlapped sufficiently for easy co-operation. The Vatican refused formal recognition of the new state, but sent a Benedictine abbot, Giuseppe Ramiro Marcone, as apostolic visitor. Gilbert wrote, "In the Croatian capital of Zagreb, as a result of intervention by [Marcone] on behalf of Jewish partners in mixed marriages, a thousand Croat Jews survived the war". While the Archbishop of Zagreb, Aloysius Stepinac, who in 1941 welcomed Croat independence, "subsequently condemned Croat atrocities against both Serbs and Jews, and saved a group of Jews in an old age home".

A number of Catholic Croat nationalists collaborated in the anti-Semitic policies of the regime. Pavelic told Nazi Foreign Minister Ribbentrop that, while the lower clergy supported the Ustase, the bishops, and particularly Stepinac, were opposed to the movement because of "Vatican international policy". In the spring of 1942, following a meeting with Pius XII in Rome, Stepinac declared publicly that it was "forbidden to exterminate Gypsies and Jews because they are said to belong to an inferior race".

The Apostolic delegate to Turkey, Angelo Roncalli, saved a number of Croatian Jews - as well as Bulgarian and Hungarian Jews - by assisting their migration to Palestine. Roncalli succeeded Pius XII as Pope John XXIII, and always said that he had been acting on the orders of Pius XII in his actions to rescue Jews.

Slovakia

Slovakia was a puppet state formed by Hitler when Germany annexed the western half of Czechoslovakia. The small agricultural region had a predominantly Catholic population, and became a nominally independent state, with a Catholic priest, Jozef Tiso as president and the extreme-nationalist Vojtech Tuka as Prime Minister. Slovakia, under Tiso and Tuka had power over 90,000 Jews. Like the Nazis other main allies, Petain, Mussolini, and Horthy - Tiso did not share the racist hard-line on Jews held by Hitler and radicals within his own government, but held a more traditional, conservative antisemitism. His regime was nonetheless highly antisemitic. Giuseppe Burzio, the Apostolic Delegate to Bratislava, protested against the anti-Semitic and totalitarianism of the Tiso regime.

In February 1942, Tiso agreed to begin deportations of Jews and Slovakia became the first Nazi ally to agree to deportations under the framework of the Final Solution. Later in 1942, amid Vatican protests as news of the fate of the deportees filtered back, and the German advance into Russia was halted, Slovakia became the first of Hitler's puppet states to shut down the deportations.

Pope Pius XII protested the deportations of Slovak Jews to the Bratislava government from 1942. Burzio also lobbied the Slovak government directly. The Vatican called in the Slovak ambassador twice to enquire what was happening. These interventions, wrote Evans, "caused Tiso, who after all was still a priest in holy orders, to have second thoughts about the programme". Burzio and others reported to Tiso that the Germans were murdering the deported Jews. Tiso hesitated and then refused to deport Slovakia's 24,000 remaining Jews. When the transportation began again in 1943 Burzio challenged Prime Minister Tuka over the extermination of Slovak Jews. The Vatican condemned the renewal of the deportations on 5 May and the Slovak episcopate issued a pastoral letter condemning totalitarianism and anti-Semitism on 8 May 1943. Pius protested that "The Holy See would fail in its Divine Mandate if it did not deplore these measures, which gravely damage man in his natural right, mainly for the reason that these people belong to a certain race."

Mark Mazower wrote that "When the Vatican protested, the government responded with defiance: 'There is no foreign intervention which would stop us on the road to the liberation of Slovakia from Jewry', insisted President Tiso". Distressing scenes at railway yards of deportees being beaten by Hlinka guards had spurred community protest, including from leading churchmen such as Bishop Pavol Jantausch. According to Mazower, "Church pressure and public anger resulted in perhaps 20,000 Jews being granted exemptions, effectively bringing the deportations there to an end". "Tuka", wrote Evans, was "forced to backtrack by public protests, especially from the Church, which by this time had been convinced of the fate that awaited the deportees. Pressure from the Germans, including a direct confrontation between Hitler and Tiso on 22 April 1943, remained without effect."

In 1943, when rumours of further deportations emerged, the Papal Nuncio in Istanbul, Msgr. Angelo Roncalli (later Pope John XXIII) and Burzio helped galvanize the Holy See into intervening in vigorous terms. On April 7, 1943, Burzio challenged Tuka, over the extermination of Slovak Jews. The Vatican condemned the renewal of the deportations on 5 May and the Slovak episcopate issued a pastoral letter condemning totalitarianism and antisemitism on 8 May 1943.

In August 1944, the Slovak National Uprising rose up against the People's Party regime. German troops were sent to quell the rebellion and with them came security police charged with rounding up Slovakia's remaining Jews. Burzio begged Tiso directly to at least spare Catholic Jews from transportation and delivered an admonition from the Pope: "the injustice wrought by his government is harmful to the prestige of his country and enemies will exploit it to discredit clergy and the Church the world over."

Bulgaria

Bulgaria signed a pact with Hitler in 1941 and reluctantly joined the Axis powers. Mgr. Angelo Roncalli - then Papal Nuncio in Turkey, later Pope John XXIII - was among those who lobbied King Boris for the protection of Jewish families. The King effectively thwarted Hitler's plans for the extermination of Bulgaria's Jews, and at war's end, Bulgaria had a larger Jewish population than it had had at the outset.

In 1943, Pius instructed his Bulgarian representative to take "all necessary steps" to support Bulgarian Jews facing deportation and his Turkish nuncio, Angelo Roncalli arranged for the transfer of thousands of children out of Bulgaria to Palestine. The Bulgarian Orthodox Church lobbied firmly against the deportations of Jews, and in March 1943, the King rescinded the order to deport them, and released Jews already in custody - an event known in Bulgaria as the "miracle of the Jewish people".

Romania

Andrea Cassulo served as Papal nuncio in Romania during the period of World War II. While the country was never occupied by Nazi Germany, the regime of Marshall Ion Antonescu aligned itself with Hitler, and assisted the Nazi Holocaust.

Cassulo has been honoured as Righteous among the Nations by Yad Vashem. In his study of the rescuers of Jews, Gilbert wrote that, Cassulo "appealed directly to Marshall Antonescu to limit the deportations [of Jews to Nazi concentration camps] planned for the summer of 1942. His appeal was ignored; hundreds of thousands of Romanian Jews were transported to Transnistria."

Angelo Roncalli advised the Pope of Jewish concentration camps in Romanian occupied Transnistria. The Pope protested to the Romanian government and authorized for funds to be sent to the camps.

In 1944, the Chief Rabbi of Bucharest praised the work of Cassulo and the Pope on behalf of Romania's Jews: "the generous assistance of the Holy See... was decisive and salutary. It is not easy for us to find the right words to express the warmth and consolation we experienced because of the concern of the supreme Pontiff, who offered a large sum to relieve the sufferings of deported Jews - sufferings which had been pointed out to him by you after your visit to Transnistria. The Jews of Romania will never forget these facts of historic importance."

Italy

Following the Nazi occupation of Italy, when news of the 15 October 1943 round-up of Roman Jews reached the Pope, he instructed Cardinal Maglione to protest to the German Ambassador to "save these innocent people". On 16 October, the Vatican secured the release of 252 children.

Hungary

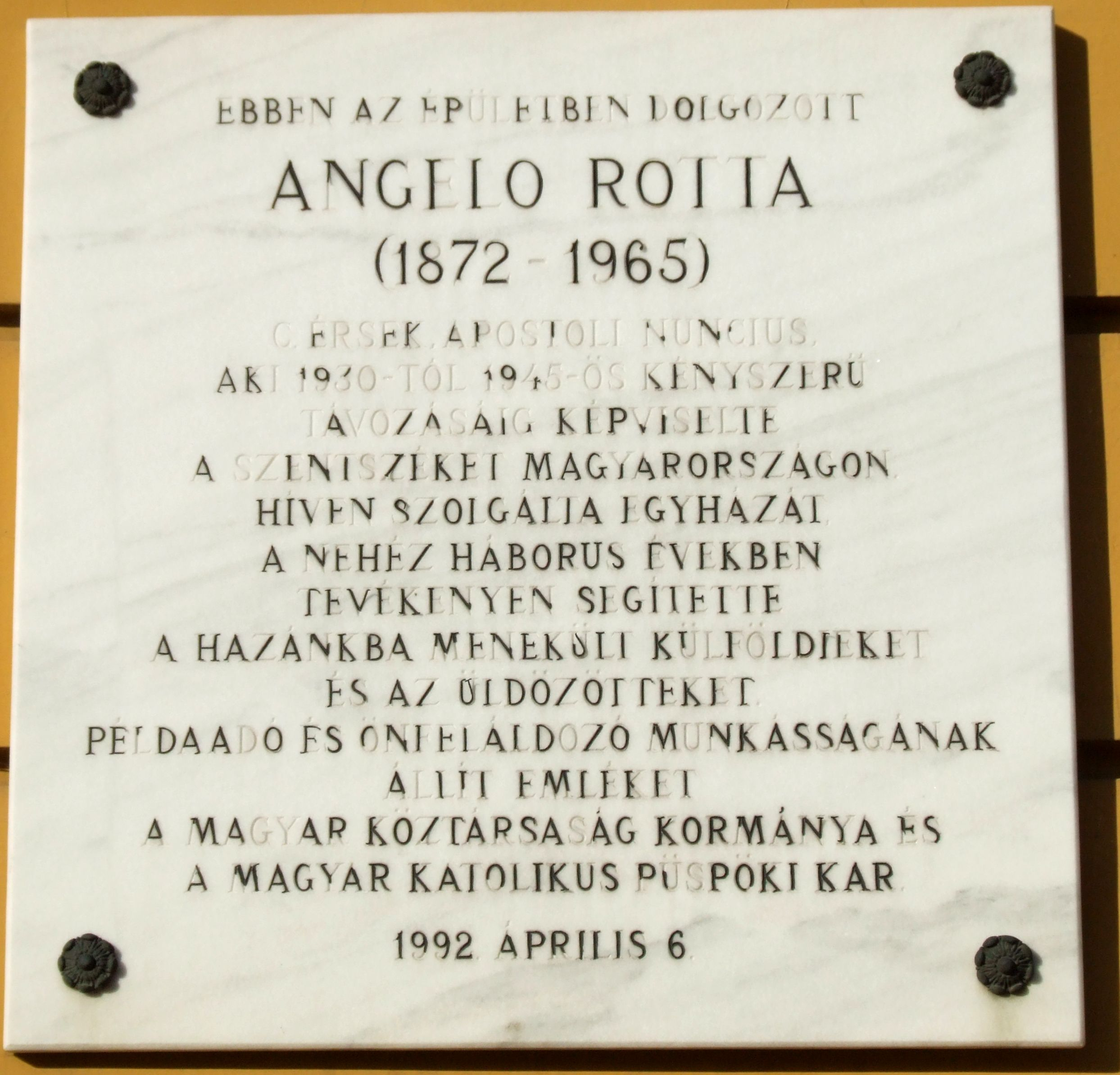
Memorial plaque to Papal Nuncio to Hungary, Angelo Rotta. Honored as a Righteous Gentile, he was active in saving Hungarian Jews.

Hungary joined the Axis Powers in 1940. Its leader, Admiral Horthy later wavered in support for the Nazi alliance. The Nazis occupied Hungary in March 1944, soon after Horthy, under significant pressure from the church and diplomatic community, had halted the deportations of Hungarian Jews. In October, they installed a pro-Nazi Arrow Cross Dictatorship.

In 1943, the Hungarian resistor, Margit Slachta, of the Hungarian Social Service Sisterhood, went to Rome to encourage papal action against the Jewish persecutions. In Hungary, she had sheltered the persecuted and protested forced labor and antisemitism. In 1944 Pius appealed directly to the Hungarian government to halt the deportation of the Jews of Hungary and his nuncio, Angelo Rotta, led a citywide rescue scheme in Budapest. The Jews of the Hungarian provinces were decimated by the Nazis and their Fascist Hungarian allies, but many of the Jews of Budapest were saved by the efforts of the diplomatic corps.

Angelo Rotta, Papal Nuncio from 1930, actively protested Hungary's mistreatment of the Jews, and helped persuade Pope Pius XII to lobby the Hungarian leader Admiral Horthy to stop their deportation. Like the celebrated Swedish diplomat Raoul Wallenberg, Rotta became a leader of diplomatic actions to protect Hungarian Jews. With the help of the Hungarian Holy Cross Association, he issued protective passports for Jews and 15,000 safe conduct passes - the nunciature sheltered some 3000 Jews in safe houses. An "International Ghetto" was established, including more than 40 safe houses marked by the Vatican and other national emblems. 25,000 Jews found refuge in these safe houses. Elsewhere in the city, Catholic institutions hid several thousand more Jewish people.

According to Gilbert, "With Arrow Cross members killing Jews in the streets of Budapest, Angelo Rotta, the senior Vatican representative in Budapest, took a lead in establishing an "International Ghetto", consisting of several dozen modern apartment buildings to which large numbers of Jews - eventually 25,000 - were brought and to which the Swiss, Swedish, Portuguese, and Spanish legations, as well as the Vatican, affixed their emblems." Rotta also got permission from the Vatican to begin issuing protective passes to Jewish converts - and was eventually able to distribute more than 15,000 such protective passes, while instructing the drafters of the documents not to examine the recipients' credentials too closely. A Red Cross official asked Rotta for pre-signed blank identity papers, to offer to the sick and needy fleeing the Arrow Cross, and was given the documents, along with Rotta's blessing. Rotta encouraged Hungarian church leaders to help their "Jewish brothers" and directed Fr Tibor Baranszky to go to the forced marches and distribute letters of immunity to as many Jews as he could. Baranszky, was executive secretary of the Jewish Protection Movement of the Holy See in Hungary and was also honoured by Yad Vashem as a Righteous Gentil for saving over 3,000 Jewish lives, acting on the orders of Pope Pius XII.

On 15 November, the Hungarian Government established the "Big Ghetto" for 69,000, while a further 30,000 with protective documents went to the International Ghetto. On 19 November 1944, the Vatican joined the four other neutral powers - Sweden, Spain, Portugal and Switzerland - in a further collective protest to the Hungarian Government calling for the suspension of deportations. The government complied and banned the "death marches" - but Budapest was by that stage near anarchy, and deportations continued from 21 November. The Arrow Cross continued their orgy of violence, raiding the international Ghetto and murdering Jews, as Soviet forces approached the city. Rotta and Wallenberg were among the few diplomats to remain in Budapest. Following the Soviet conquest of the city, Wallenberg was seized by the Russians and taken to Moscow, from where he was never released. Gilbert wrote that of the hundred and fifty thousand Jews who had been in Budapest when the Germans arrived in March 1944, almost 120,000 survived to liberation - 69,000 from the Big Ghetto, 25,000 in the International Ghetto and a further 25,000 hiding out in Christian homes and religious institutes across the city.

=== Assessments of Pius XII ===
According to Paul O'Shea, "The Nazis demonised the Pope as the agent of international Jewry; the Americans and British were continually frustrated because he would not condemn Nazi aggression; and the Russians accused him of being an agent of Fascism and the Nazis." Pinchas Lapide, a Jewish theologian and Israeli diplomat to Milan in the 1960s, estimated in Three Popes and the Jews that Pius "was instrumental in saving at least 700,000 but probably as many as 860,000 Jews from certain death at Nazi hands." Some historians, like Gilbert, have questioned this.

Upon the death of Pius XII in 1958, the Israeli Foreign Minister Golda Meir said: "When fearful martyrdom came to our people in the decade of Nazi terror, the voice of the Pope was raised for the victims. The life of our times was enriched by a voice speaking out on the great moral truths above the tumult of daily conflict. We mourn a great servant of peace." Leading historian of the Holocaust, Sir Martin Gilbert, has said that Pope Pius XII should be declared a "righteous gentile" by Yad Vashem. But his insistence on Vatican neutrality and avoidance of naming the Nazis as the evildoers of the conflict became the foundation for contemporary and later criticisms from some quarters.

Hitler biographer John Toland, while scathing of Pius' cautious public comments in relation to the mistreatment of Jews, concluded that nevertheless, "The Church, under the Pope's guidance, had already saved the lives of more Jews than all other churches, religious institutions and rescue organizations combined...". In 1999, journalist John Cornwell's controversial book Hitler's Pope criticized Pius XII for his actions and inactions during the Holocaust. The Encyclopædia Britannica described Cornwell's depiction of Pius XII as anti-Semitic as lacking "credible substantiation".

In specific riposte to Cornwell's moniker, American Rabbi and historian, David Dalin, published The Myth of Hitler's Pope: How Pope Pius XII Rescued Jews from the Nazis in 2005. He reaffirmed previous accounts of Pius having been a savior of thousands of Europe's Jews. Dalin's book also argued that Cornwell and others were liberal Catholics and ex-Catholics who "exploit the tragedy of the Jewish people during the Holocaust to foster their own political agenda of forcing changes on the Catholic Church today" and that Pius XII was responsible for saving the lives of many thousands of Jews.

Susan Zuccotti's Under His Very Windows: The Vatican and the Holocaust in Italy (2000) and Michael Phayer's The Catholic Church and the Holocaust, 1930–1965 (2000) and Pius XII, The Holocaust, and the Cold War (2008) provided further critical, though more scholarly analysis of Pius's legacy. Daniel Goldhagen's A Moral Reckoning and David Kertzer's The Pope Against the Jews denounced Pius, while Ralph McInery and José Sanchez wrote more nuanced critical assessments of Pius XII's pontificate. Gabriel Wilensky's Six Million Crucifixions: How Christian Teachings About Jews Paved the Road to the Holocaust (2010) was also very critical of both the wartime pope and the Catholic and Protestant churches for instilling in the minds of hundreds of millions of Christians the virulent antisemitism that eventually led to the paroxysm of murder that was the Holocaust. Wilensky holds the position that Pius XII should have spoken against the genocide of the Jews and he should have done "this everywhere, loudly and plainly, and he should have done it relentlessly and through every means of communication available to the Vatican." This sentiment was echoed by Konrad Adenauer, the Catholic mayor of Cologne, who said in a private letter after the war when he had become chancellor of Germany, "I believe that if all the bishops had together made public statements from the pulpits on a particular day, they could have prevented a great deal."

A number of other scholars replied with favorable accounts of the Pius XII, including Margherita Marchione's Yours Is a Precious Witness: Memoirs of Jews and Catholics in Wartime Italy (1997), Pope Pius XII: Architect for Peace (2000) and Consensus and Controversy: Defending Pope Pius XII (2002); Pierre Blet's Pius XII and the Second World War, According to the Archives of the Vatican (1999); and Ronald J. Rychlak's Hitler, the War and the Pope (2000). Ecclesiastical historian William Doino (author of The Pius War: Responses to the Critics of Pius XII), concluded that Pius was "emphatically not silent".

In 2020, the Vatican opened the World War II archives to allow researchers to read original texts, including correspondence to Pius XII. Through these archives, it was revealed that Hitler had sent a "Nazi prince" envoy to speak to Pius XII directly within weeks of his election.

== Episcopal protests ==
Various bishops protested the Nazi mistreatment of Jews.

=== The Netherlands ===
On July 11, 1942, the Dutch bishops, joined all Christian denominations in sending a letter to the Nazi General Friedrich Christiansen in protest against the treatment of Jews. The letter was read in all Catholic churches against German opposition. It brought attention to mistreatment of Jews and asked all Christians to pray for them:

Ours is a time of great tribulations of which two are foremost: the sad destiny of the Jews and the plight of those deported for forced labor. … All of us must be aware of the terrible sufferings which both of them have to undergo, due to no guilt of their own. We have learned with deep pain of the new dispositions which impose upon innocent Jewish men, women and children the deportation into foreign lands. … The incredible suffering which these measures cause to more than 10,000 people is in absolute opposition to the divine precepts of justice and charity. … Let us pray to God and for the intercession of Mary … that he may lend his strength to the people of Israel, so severely tried in anguish and persecution

— Protest of the Dutch Bishops, 1942

The protest angered the Nazi authorities and deportations of Jews only increased - including Catholic converts. Many Catholics were involved in strikes and protests against the treatment of Jews, and the Nazis offered to exempt converts and Jews married to non-Jews if protests ceased. The Archbishop of Utrecht and other Catholics refused to comply, and the Nazis commenced a roundup of all ethnically Jewish Catholics. Some 40,000 Jews were hidden by the Dutch church and 49 priests killed by the Nazis in the process. Among the Catholics of the Netherlands abducted in this way was Saint Edith Stein who died at Auschwitz.

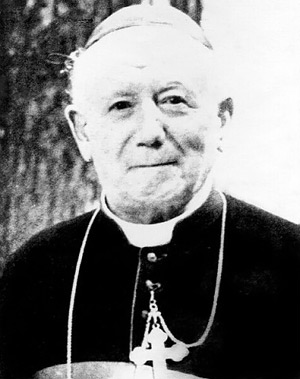
The Archbishop of Toulouse, Jules-Géraud Saliège led the 1942 denunciation of the mistreatment of Jews

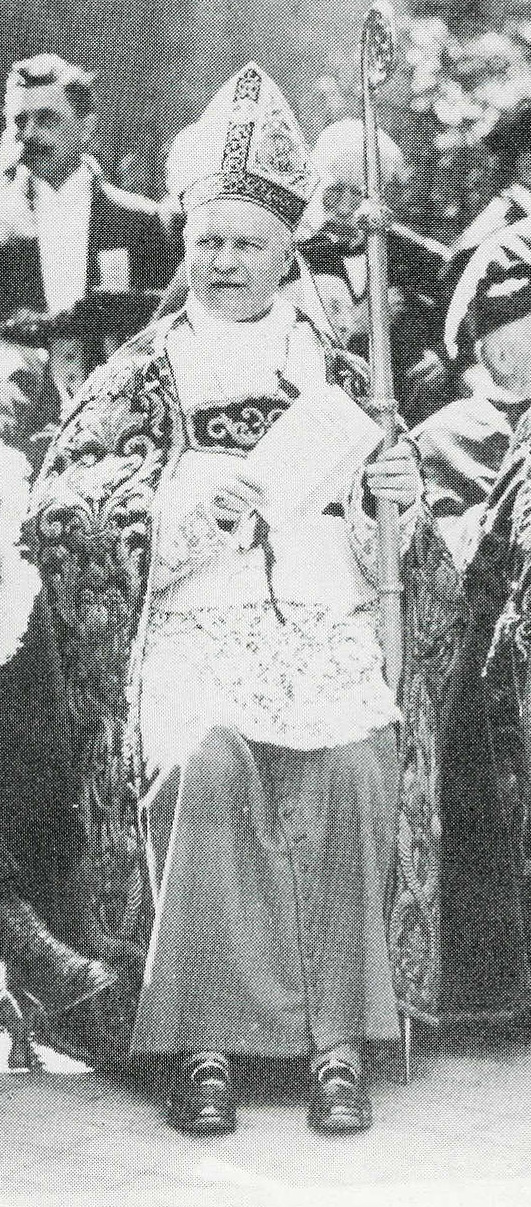
Cardinal Jozef-Ernest van Roey of Belgium was active in rescuing Jews

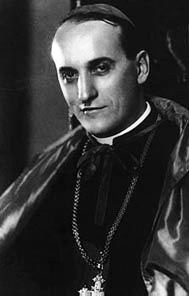
Archbishop Aloysius Stepinac initially welcomed the Independent State of Croatia, but subsequently condemned the Nazi-aligned state's atrocities

=== France ===
The French bishops were initially cautious in speaking out against mistreatment of Jews. Cardinal Gerlier said that the treatment of the Jews was bad, but did not take effective action to pressure the Vichy Government.

Following the Velodrom d'Hiver roundup of Jews of July 15, 1942, the Northern assembly of cardinals and archbishops sent a protest letter to Pétain. With the free press silenced, Charles Lederman, a Jewish Communist approached the Archbishop of Toulouse, Jules-Géraud Saliège, to alert public opinion to what was being done to the Jews. He told Saliège of the arrests, kidnappings and deportations. Saliège read his famous Pastoral letter the following Sunday. Other bishops - Monseigneur Théas, Bishop of Montauban, Monseigneur Delay, Bishop of Marseilles, Cardinal Gerlier, Archbishop of Lyon, Monseigneur Vansteenberghe of Bayonne and Monseigneur Moussaron, Archbishop of Albi - also denounced the roundups from the pulpit and through parish distributions, in defiance of the Vichy regime. The protest of the bishops is seen by various historians as a turning point in the formerly passive response of the Catholic Church in France.

Archbishop Saliège of Toulouse wrote to his parishioners: "The Jews are men; the Jewesses are women. The foreigners are men and women. One may not do anything one wishes to these men, to these women, to these fathers and mothers. They are part of the human race; they are our brothers, like so many others. A Christian cannot forget this." The words encouraged other clerics like the Capuchin friar Père Marie-Benoît, who saved many Jews in Marseille and later in Rome where he became known among the Jewish community as "father of the Jews". Marie-Rose Gineste transported a pastoral letter from Bishop Théas of Montauban by bicycle to forty parishes, denouncing the uprooting of men and women "treated as wild animals", and the French Resistance smuggled the text to London, where it was broadcast to France by the BBC, reaching tens of thousands of homes.

=== Belgium ===
Cardinal van Roey, the head of the Catholic Church in Belgium intervened with the authorities to rescue Jews and encouraged various institutions to aid Jewish children. One of his acts of rescue was to open a geriatric center in which Jews were housed, at which kosher Jewish cooks would be required who could therefore be given special passes protecting them from deportation.

=== Croatia ===
In Croatia, the Vatican's apostolic visitor Giuseppe Marcone, together with Archbishop Aloysius Stepinac of Zagreb pressured the Pavelić regime to cease its facilitation of race murders. In the spring of 1942, following a meeting with Pius XII in Rome, Archbishop Aloysius Stepinac of Zagreb declared publicly that it was "forbidden to exterminate Gypsies and Jews because they are said to belong to an inferior race". In July and October 1943, Stepinac denounced race murders in the most explicit terms, and had his denunciation read from pulpits across Croatia.

When Schutzstaffel chief Heinrich Himmler visited Zagreb in 1943, indicating the impending roundup of remaining Jews, Stepinac wrote Pavelic that if this occurred, he would protest for "the Catholic Church is not afraid of any secular power, whatever it may be, when it has to protect basic human values". When deportation began, Stepinac and Marcone protested to Andrija Artukovic. According to Phayer, the Vatican ordered Stepinac to save as many Jews as possible during the upcoming roundup. Though Stepinac personally saved many potential victims, his protests had little effect on Pavelić.

=== Slovakia ===
Bishop Pavel Gojdic protested the persecution of Slovak Jews. Gojdic was beatified by Pope John Paul II in 2001 and recognized as Righteous Among the Nations by Yad Vashem in 2007.

=== Hungary ===
In Hungary, the Vatican and the Papal Nuncio Angelo Rotta lobbied the Horthy government to protect the country's Jews, while leading church figures involved in the 1944 rescue of Hungarian Jews included Bishops Vilmos Apor, Endre Hamvas and Áron Márton. Primate József Mindszenty issued public and private protests and was arrested on 27 October 1944.

Following the October 1944 Arrow Cross takeover of Hungary, Bishop Vilmos Apor (who had been an active protester against the mistreatment of the Jews), together with other senior clergy including József Mindszenty, drafted a memorandum of protest against the Arrow Cross government. Cardinal Jusztinián György Serédi also spoke out against the Nazi persecution.

== Catholic networks ==
=== Netherlands ===
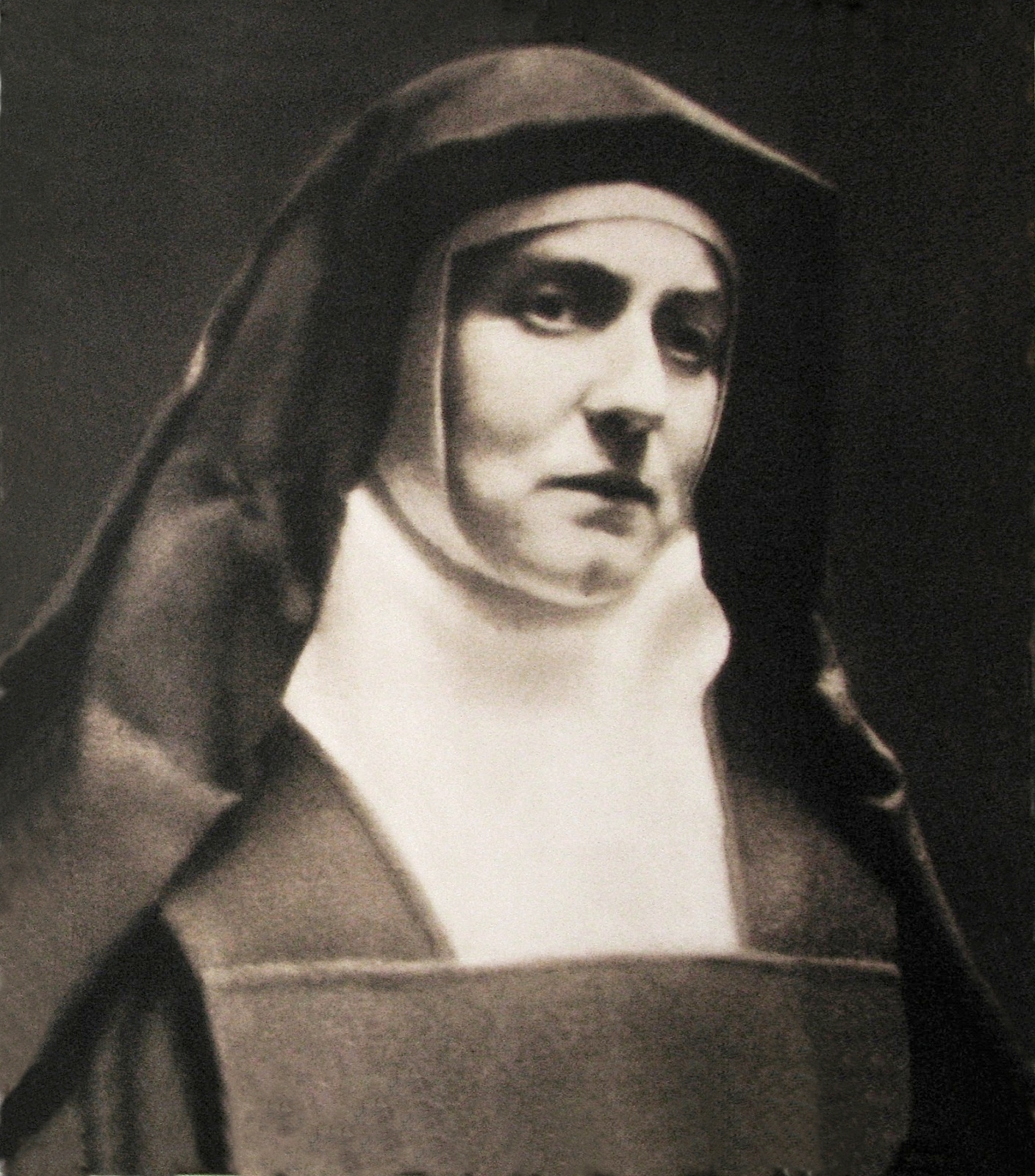
Edith Stein (ca. 1938-1939)

During the Nazi Occupation of the Netherlands, when Jewish deportations began, many were hidden in Catholic areas. Parish priests created networks for hiding Jews, and close-knit country parishes were able to hide Jews without being informed upon by neighbors as occurred in the cities. Gilbert wrote, "as in every country under German occupation, so in Holland, local priests played a major part in rescuing Jews". Archbishop De Jong played a major role in the resistance against the Nazis. He kept address info on hidden Jewish children in the vaults of his palace. Also, the Catholic church protested regularly against the persecution of Jews in Holland. This sometimes led to persecution of converted Jews, such as Sister Edith Stein. In the province of Limburg, 88 priests were deported and killed - more than from all the other Dutch provinces combined. Some priests were killed during their arrests, such as Father Harry Koopmans in Den Bosch. The Dutch received the most recognitions per capita from Yad Vashem for saving Jews compared to all other occupied countries, namely some 5,900 out of a total of 26,000 (the Poles received a greater absolute number, at 6,200).

=== Belgium ===
Dislike of Germans and Nazism was strong in Belgium, and self-help by Jews was well organized. Following the occupation of Belgium, the Belgian Catholic Church played an important role in the defense of Jews. About 3000 Jews were hidden in Belgian convents during the Nazi occupation. 48 Belgian nuns have been honored as Righteous among the Nations. Others so honored include the Superior General of the Jesuits, Jean-Baptiste Janssens.

Many Belgian convents and monasteries sheltered Jewish children, pretending that they were Christian - among them the Franciscan Sisters in Bruges, the Sisters of Don Bosco in Courtrai, the Sisters of St Mary near Brussels, the Dominican Sisters at Lubbeek, and others. Father Joseph Andre of Namur found shelter for around 100 children in convents, returning them to Jewish community leaders after the war. Andre was very active in the rescue of Jews, handing over his own bed to Jewish refugees, finding families to hide them, and distributing food as well as communications between families. He is credited with saving some 200 lives and was forced into hiding in the final stages of the war.

The Benedictine monk Dom Bruno (Henri Reynders) was active with the Belgian Resistance, and organized escape routes for downed allied pilots and for Belgian Jews. At Bruno's request, Jews were hidden in monasteries, schools, and the homes of Catholics. Bruno, who is credited with finding refuge for 320 Jewish children, was declared Righteous Among the Nations by Israel in 1964. Bruno developed a disdain for Nazi anti-Semitism when exposed to it on a 1938 visit to Germany. He was captured as a prisoner of war while serving as an army chaplain in 1940, and in 1942 was sent by the head of the Benedictines to a Home for the Blind, which operated as a front for hiding Jews. Assisted by Albert Van den Berg, Dom Bruno's rescue efforts grew from their initially small scale, eventually dispersing hundreds. Van den Berg secured refuge for the Grand Rabbi of Liege and his elderly parents at the Capuchin Banneux home, where they were cared for by friars. Bruno rejoined the Belgian Army as a chaplain after Liberation.

The Belgian Resistance viewed the defense of Jews as a central part of its activities. The Comité de Défense des Juifs (CDJ) was formed to work for the defense of Jews in the summer of 1942, and of its eight founding members, seven were Jewish, and one, Emile Hambresin, was Catholic. Some of their rescue operations were overseen by the priests Joseph André and Dom Bruno. The CDJ enlisted the help of monasteries and religious schools and hospitals, among other institutions. Yvonne Nèvejean of the Oeuvre Nationale de l'Enfance greatly assisted with the hiding of Jewish children. According to Gilbert, over four and a half thousand Jewish children were given refuge in Christian families, convents, boarding schools, orphanages, and sanatoria because of the efforts of Nèvejean.

Among these children were the sisters (Rosa) Regina and (Stella) Estelle Feld of Antwerp. Their father, Abraham Feld, was arrested and sent directly to Auschwitz, where he was murdered and cremated immediately on arrival. Their mother, Leah (Leni) Schwimmerova Felt, placed her daughters in the care of nuns, who helped hide them for the entire course of the war, with farm families and in Catholic orphanages and schools. Leah was later arrested and taken to Auschwitz, where she too was murdered. After the war, the children were reunited with an uncle, Samuel Feld, of Scranton, Pennsylvania, who adopted them and took them to the US.

The Queen Mother Elizabeth and Léon Platteau of the Interior Ministry also took a stance to protect Jews.

Fr. Hubert Célis of Halmaal was arrested for harboring Jewish children, but was released after confronting his interrogator with the following words: "You are a Catholic, and have forgotten that the Virgin was a Jewess, that Christ was Jewish, that He commanded us to love and help one another... That He told us: 'I have given you an example so that you do as I have done'... You are a Catholic, and you do not understand what a priest is! You do not understand that a priest does not betray!".

=== Hungary ===
The Hungarian Regent, Admiral Horthy, though allied to Hitler, did not adopt Nazi racial ideology, and Hungarian Jews were not subject to deportations to death camps through 1942-3. The Nazis occupied Hungary in 1944 and commenced widescale deportations of Jews. The process began with Jews sent to ghettos, and though local leaders of the Catholic and Protestant Reform Churches tried to help the Jews, Jews from all across Hungary outside of Budapest were deported to Auschwitz.

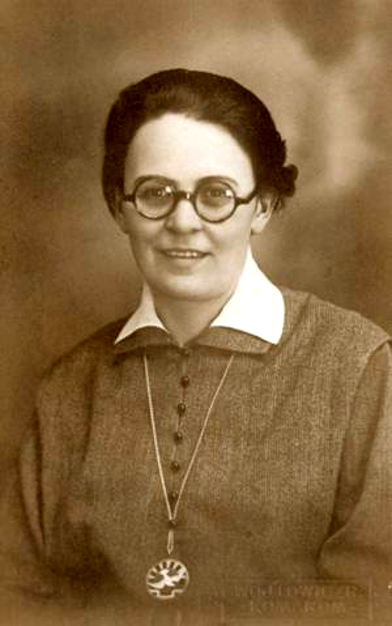
Blessed Sr Sára Salkaházi was shot for sheltering Jews in 1944. She was a member of Margit Slachta's Hungarian Sisters of Social Service.

As rumor spread of the murder of the deportees, the Hungarian Ministry for the Interior criticized clergymen for issuing fake baptismal certificates. On June 26, 1944, confirmation of the mass murder at Auschwitz spurred the neutral powers in Budapest - including the Vatican - into action, seeking to thwart Nazi efforts to exterminate the Jews by issuing protective visas. The virulently anti-Semitic Arrow Cross seized power in October, and the murderous campaign against the Jews was re-opened. Papal Nunico Angelo Rotta led the neutral diplomats in establishing an "international Ghetto" under their protection. Rotta also encouraged Hungarian church leaders to help their "Jewish brothers" and directed Fr Tibor Baranszky to go to the forced marches and distribute letters of immunity to as many Jews as he could.

Local church men and women were also prominent in rescue efforts. Jesuit Prior Jakab Raile is credited with saving around 150 Jews in the Jesuit residence of the city. Margit Slachta, of the Hungarian Social Service Sisterhood, told the other Sisters that the precepts of their faith demanded that they protect the Jews, even if it led to their own deaths. Slachta responded immediately to reports in 1940 of early displacement of Jews. When 20,000 Jewish laborers were deported in 1941, Slachta protested to the wife of Admiral Horthy. Following the Nazi occupation, the Sisters of Social Service arranged baptisms in the hope it would spare people from deportation, sent food and supplies to the Jewish ghettos, and sheltered people in their convents. One of the Sisters, The Blessed Sára Salkaházi, was among those captured sheltering the Jews, and executed. Slachta herself was beaten and only narrowly avoided execution. The Sisters rescued probably more than 2000 Hungarian Jews.

In his study of the rescuers of the Jews, Martin Gilbert recounts that the brothers of the Champagnat Institute of the Order of Mary in Budapest took in 100 children and 50 parents as boarders. When they were discovered, the Jews were killed, and six brothers tortured but released. Similar numbers were protected and then discovered in the convents of the Sisters of the Divine Saviour and the Order of the Divine Love, with many of the Jews dragged out and murdered by the Arrow Cross. The prioress of the Sisters of the Eucharistic Union was captured and tortured for sheltering Jews in her hospital. Despite warnings, she resumed her rescue efforts in the apartment of the Prelate Arnold Pataky. Hundreds more Jews were saved at the Convent of the Good Shepherd, the home of the Sisters of Mercy of Szatmar and the Convent of Sacre Coeur.

=== Baltic States ===
In Lithuania, priests were active in the rescue of Jews, among them Fr Dambrauskas of Alsėdžiai (who acted against the wishes of his bishop), Bronius Paukštys of Kaunas, Fr Lapis from Šiauliai and Fr Jonas Gylys of Varėna, who delivered sermons against the killing of Jews, and sought to comfort Jews marked for murder.

In Scandinavia, the Catholic presence was small, but here the Christian Churches firmly opposed the deportations of Jews - Church of Norway bishops gave stern warnings, and the Danish Churches published strong protests and urged their congregations to assist Jews. A unique operation in Denmark saw almost all of Denmark's Jews smuggled into Sweden and safety.

=== Poland and the Zegota Council to Aid Jews ===
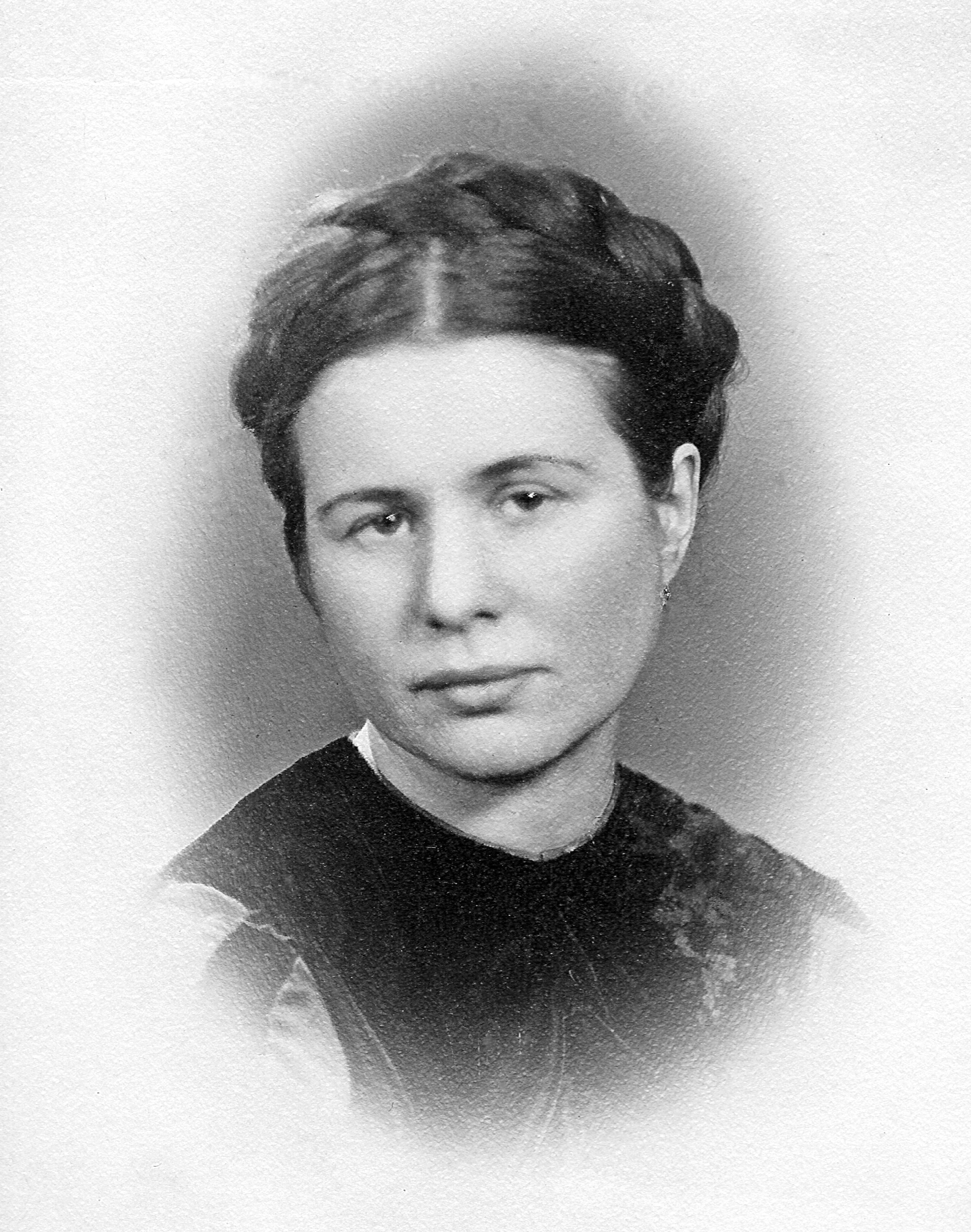
Irena Sendlerowa, head of the children's section of Żegota, the Council to Aid Jews, founded by Catholics

Poland had the largest Jewish population in Europe before World War II. There were 3,500,000 Jews living in the Second Republic, about 10% of the general population. Between the German invasion of Poland in 1939, and the end of World War II, over 90% of Polish Jewry perished. Nevertheless, more Jews were rescued by Catholics in Poland than in any other nation. According to Davies, the number of Jews saved by Poles is conservatively estimated at 100,000–150,000. The number of sheltered Jews according to Lukas was "as high as 450,000" at one time. Professor Tomasz Strzembosz put the total number of Catholic Poles saving Jews at 1 million. Among the 108 Martyrs of World War II beatified in 1999 by Pope John Paul II, prominent place belongs to religious people murdered by Nazi Germany for saving Jews.

In December 1942, several hundred Christian Poles were summarily shot in open pits for sheltering Jews in the vicinity of the Słonim Ghetto, along with their priest, Adam Sztark and two nuns. The nuns, Marta Kazimiera Wołowska, the superior of the convent, and Bogumiła Noiszewska, a doctor, were beatified by Pope John Paul II together with Father Sztark. In 2001, Sztark became the first Jesuit ever awarded the title of Righteous Among the Nations by the state of Israel. He had delivered food to the ghetto, purchased with cash donations from his parishioners. He also issued false certificates, personally sheltered Jewish refugees, and called upon all his congregation to help to save the ghetto residents.

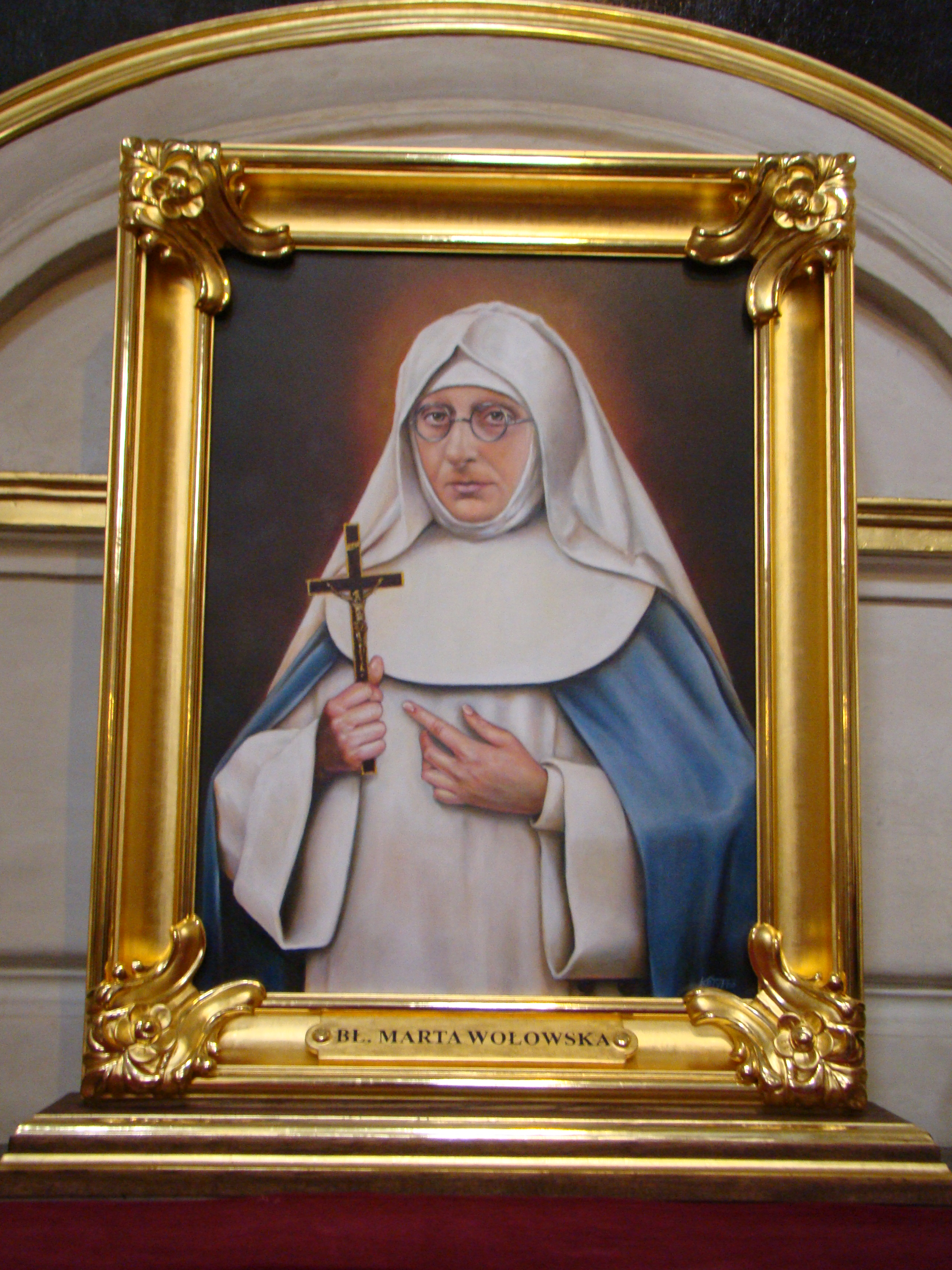
Beatified Marta Wołowska of Słonim, murdered for saving Jews

The memorial at Belzec death camp commemorates 600,000 murdered Jews, and 1,500 Poles who tried to save Jews. To date, 7,232 Catholic Poles have been honoured as Righteous Among the Nations by Yad Vashem - constituting the largest national contingent. Hundreds of clergymen and nuns were involved in aiding Poland's Jews during the war, though precise numbers are difficult to confirm. From 1941, such aid carried the death penalty. Up to 50,000 Poles were executed by Nazi Germany solely as penalty for saving Jews. Gilbert notes that, in relation to the development of Poland's Jewish rescue networks, Yisrael Gutman wrote that "One particular sector of the intelligentsia - comprising both men of progressive views and devout Catholics who worked with unrelenting devotion to rescue Jews - was of singular importance" and from these circles grew Zegota, the Council for the Assistance to the Jews.

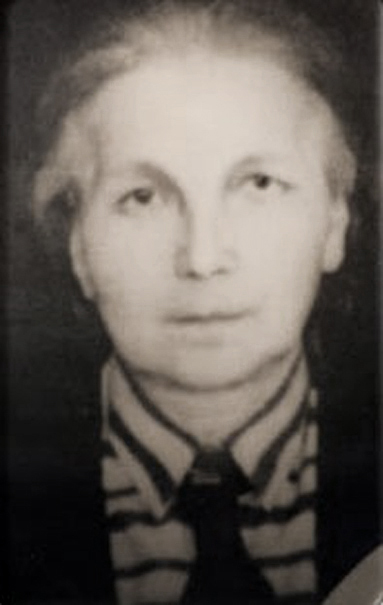
Blessed Sister Kratochwil, tortured to death by Gestapo for trying to protect Jewish prisoners

A number of bishops provided aid to Polish Jews, notably Karol Niemira, the Bishop of Pinsk, who cooperated with the underground organization maintaining ties with the Jewish Ghetto and sheltered Jews in the Archbishop's residence. Oskar Schindler, a German Catholic businessman came to Poland, initially to profit from the German invasion. He went on to save many Jews, as dramatized in the film Schindler's List. Gilbert notes various Polish nuns honored by Yad Vashem for sheltering Jews in their convents; the work of Polish priests in supplying fake baptismal certificates; and the work of parish priests, like the priest from Nowy Dwór who was tortured and beaten to death for protecting a Jewish girl, and Fr. Marceli Godlewski, who opened his crypt to Jews escaping the Ghetto. In Kolonia Wilenska, Sister Bertranda hid members of the Jewish underground in the Vilna ghetto.

The Jews of Warsaw, who prior to the war numbered some half a million people, were forced into the Warsaw Ghetto in 1940. By November 1941, the Nazi governor of the city had decreed that the death penalty would be applied with utmost severity to those sheltering or aiding Jews in any way. Matylda Getter, mother superior of the Franciscan Sisters of the Family of Mary took the decision to offer shelter to any Jewish children who could escape the Ghetto. Getter's convent was located at the entrance to the Ghetto. When the Nazis commenced the clearing of the Ghetto in 1941, Getter took in many orphans and dispersed them among Family of Mary homes. As the Nazis began sending orphans to the gas chambers, Getter issued fake baptismal certificates, providing the children with false identities. Living in daily fear of the Germans, the Family of Mary rescued more than 750 Jews.

When AK Home Army Intelligence discovered the true fate of transports leaving the Jewish Ghetto, the Council to Aid Jews - Rada Pomocy Żydom (codename Zegota) was established in late 1942. The organization, founded by the Catholic writer and activist, Zofia Kossak-Szczucka and the socialist Wanda Filipowicz, ultimately saved thousands. Emphasis was placed on protecting children, as it was near impossible to intervene directly against the heavily guarded transports. False papers were prepared, and children were distributed among safe houses and church networks. Jewish children were often placed in church orphanages and convents. Poland was the only country in occupied Europe where such an organization was established. Some of its members had been involved in Polish nationalist movements which were themselves anti-Jewish but were appalled by the barbarity of the Nazi mass murders. In an emotive protest prior to the foundation of the Council, Kossak wrote that Hitler's race murders were a crime of which it was not possible to remain silent. While Polish Catholics might still feel Jews were "enemies of Poland", Kossak wrote that protest was required.

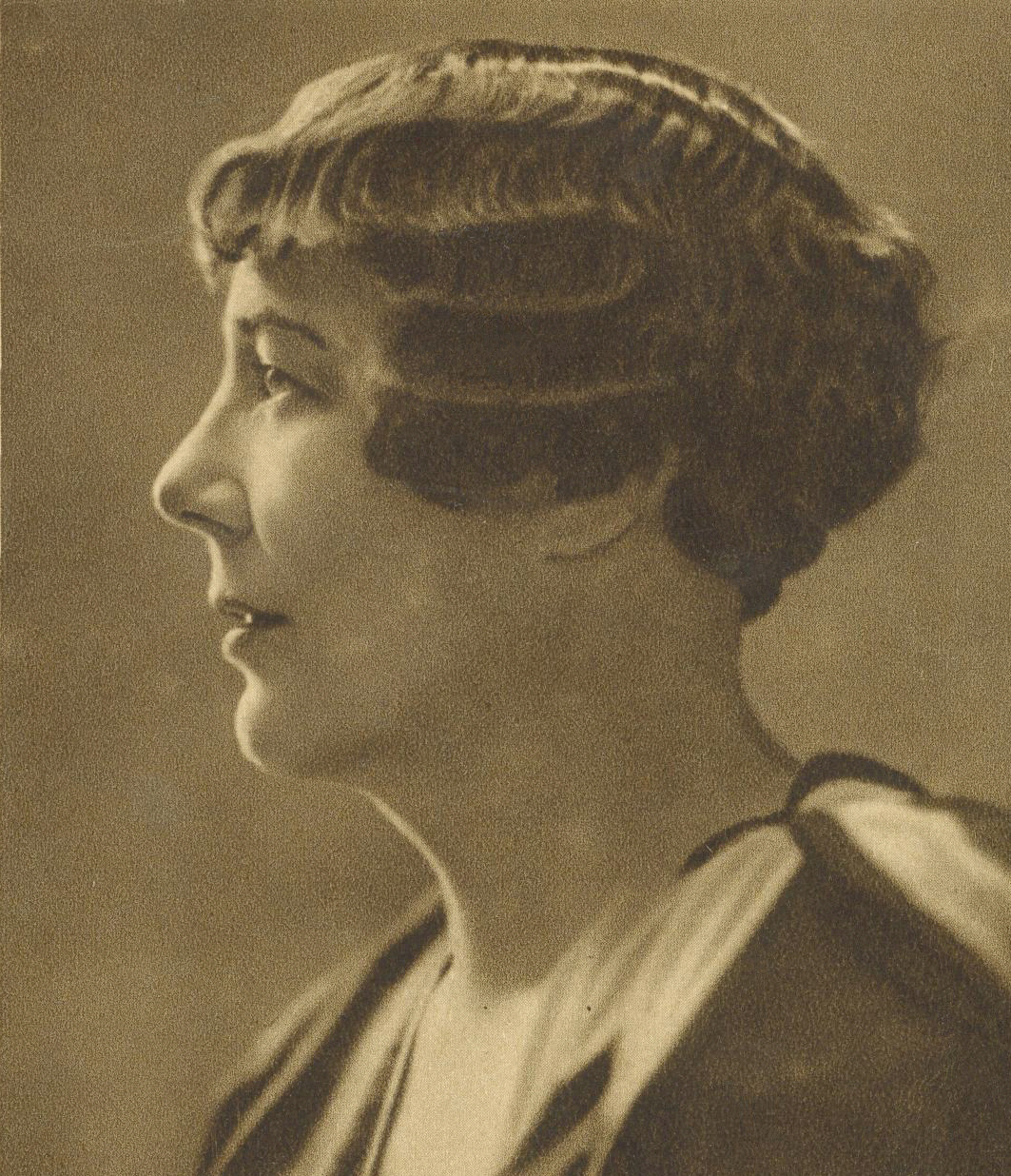
Zofia Kossak-Szczucka, co-founder of Zegota.

God requires this protest from us, God who does not allow murder. It is required of a Catholic conscience. Each being, calling itself human, has a right to brotherly love. The blood of the innocent calls for vengeance to the heavens. He, who does not support this protest - is not Catholic.

— 1942 protest of Zofia Kossak-Szczucka of Zegota

Wladyslawa Choms, "The Angel of Lvov", headed Zegota in Lvov, helped by the Church and the Home Army. She described the Catholic clergy, who supplied blank baptismal certificates from which to create false documents, as "invaluable" to the effort. Wladyslaw Bartoszewski (aka "Teofil"), a co-founder of Zegota, had worked with the Catholic underground movement, the Front for the Rebirth of Poland, and was arrested in a 1940 Nazi purge of the intelligentsia and sent to Auschwitz. Freed seven months later following pressure from the international Red Cross, Bartoszewski helped Zegota in its rescue efforts. Explaining his motivation, he later said: "I was raised a Catholic and we were taught to love our neighbor. I was doing what the Bible taught." He was recognized as Righteous Among the Nations in 1963. As head of Zegota's children's section, Irena Sendlerowa placed more than 2500 Jewish children in convents, orphanages, schools, hospitals and homes. She was captured by the Gestapo in 1943 and crippled by torture.

In the 1948-9 Zegota Case, the Stalin-backed regime established in Poland after the war secretly tried and imprisoned the leading survivors of Zegota, as part of a campaign to eliminate and besmirch Catholic resistance heroes who might threaten the new regime. Bartoszewski was imprisoned until 1954.

=== France ===
As Gilbert wrote, "Many priests and nuns, and Catholic institutions throughout France did what they could to save Jews from deportation", and accordingly many French clergy and religious have been honored by Yad Vashem. The first deportation of Jews from Paris occurred on 27 March 1942. Mostly Polish-born, they were taken to Auschwitz. Deportations continued through the following months and intensified in August. Gilbert wrote: "Senior church figures took a leading role: just south of Lyons, Protestant and Catholic clerics, including Cardinal Gerlier, the Archbishop of Lyons, joined forces with Jewish resistance groups to find hiding places for five hundred adults and more than a hundred children... Not only Cardinal Gerlier, but also his Secretary, Monseigneur Jean-Baptiste Maury (later Bishop of Reims), were honoured [by Yad Vashem] for their acts of rescue." Thousands of priests, monks, nuns, and lay people performed acts of charity toward the persecuted Jews of France. On 28 August 1942, the Germans ordered the arrest of all Catholic priests sheltering Jews.

The Times reported that Cardinal Gerlier had defiantly refused to surrender Jewish children being sheltered in Catholic homes, and that multiple arrests had been made, including of Jesuits who had been sheltering hundreds of children. The Vatican denounced the treatment of Jews in France to the Vichy French ambassador to the Holy See. Monsignor Gabriel Piguet, the Bishop of Clermont-Ferrand, allowed Jewish children to be hidden from the Nazis at the Saint Marguerite Catholic boarding school in Clermont-Ferrand and was arrested in his Cathedral on 28 May 1944. He was deported to Dachau Concentration Camp in September. At Dachau, Piguet presided over the secret ordination of The Blessed Karl Leisner.

Two-thirds of the 300,000 Jews living in France at the outbreak of war survived the Nazi holocaust. Thousands of priests, nuns and lay people acted to assist French Jews. The majority of French Jews survived the occupation, in large part thanks to the help received from Catholics and Protestants, who protected them in convents, boarding schools, presbyteries and families. The Amitiés Chrétiennes organization operated out of Lyon to secure hiding places for Jewish children. Among its members were the Jesuit Pierre Chaillet and Alexandre Glasberg, a priest formerly of the Jewish faith. The influential French theologian Henri de Lubac was active in the resistance to Nazism and to antisemitism. He assisted in the publication of Témoinage chrétien with Pierre Chaillet. He responded to Neo-paganism and antisemitism with clarity, describing the notion of an Aryan New Testament standing in contradiction to a Semitic Old Testament as "blasphemy" and "stupidity". In 1988, Lubac returned to writing about the era in Résistance chrétienne à l'antisémitisme, souvenirs 1940-1944 (Christian Resistance to Antisemitism: Memories from 1940 to 1944).

Mothers Superior of many convents provided safe haven to French Jews. Agnes Walsh, a British Daughter of Charity who spent the war in occupied France, was recognised as Righteous among the Nations for sheltering a Jewish family in her convent from 1943. The Archbishop of Nice, Paul Remond, facilitated underground activities hiding Jewish children in convents till they could be given safely to Christian families. The Carmelite friar Lucien Bunel (Jacques de Jesus) was sent to the Mauthausen Death Camp for sheltering three Jewish boys at his school (dramatized in the 1987 film Au revoir les enfants, made by Louis Malle, one of his former pupils). Bunel had opened his church to refugees fleeing Nazi persecution and hired a Jewish teacher fired under discriminatory laws. He died of exhaustion days after Liberation. Although Bunel was able to inform his senior students of the Jewish identity of the boys and the secret was kept, a former pupil who had joined the resistance revealed under torture that it was Bunel who had put him in contact with the resistance.

Four Claretian priests at a Mission in Paris - Gilberto Valtierra, Joaquín Aller, Emilio Martín and Ignacio Turrillas - forged 155 baptismal certificates and marriage certificates between October 3, 1940, and July 12, 1944 to shield Jews from the efforts of the collaborationist French authorities to round up Jews. Most of them were Sephardic Jews whose ancestors had fled Spain during the expulsion and persecution of the 15th century.

On the Swiss border, various priests and parishes helped Jews escape to safety. Raymond Boccard and other priests assisted hundreds of refugees, including many Jews, across the border into Switzerland. Abbé Simon Gallay hid Jews at Evian-les-Bains, and assisted passage to Switzerland, until arrested and deported to Germany, never to return.

=== Italy ===
Despite the Italian Dictator Mussolini's close alliance with Hitler's Germany, Italy did not adopt Nazism's genocidal ideology towards the Jews. The Nazis were frustrated by the Italian forces' refusal to co-operate in the roundups of Jews, and no Jews were deported from Italy prior to the Italian capitulation and Nazi occupation of the country in 1943. As anti-Axis sentiment became more widespread within Italy, the use of Vatican Radio to broadcast papal disapproval of race murder and anti-Semitism angered the Nazis. After the deposal of Mussolini in 1943, the Nazis moved to occupy Italy and commenced a round-up of Jews. Though thousands were caught, the great majority of Italy's Jews were saved. As in other nations, Catholic networks were heavily engaged in rescue efforts.

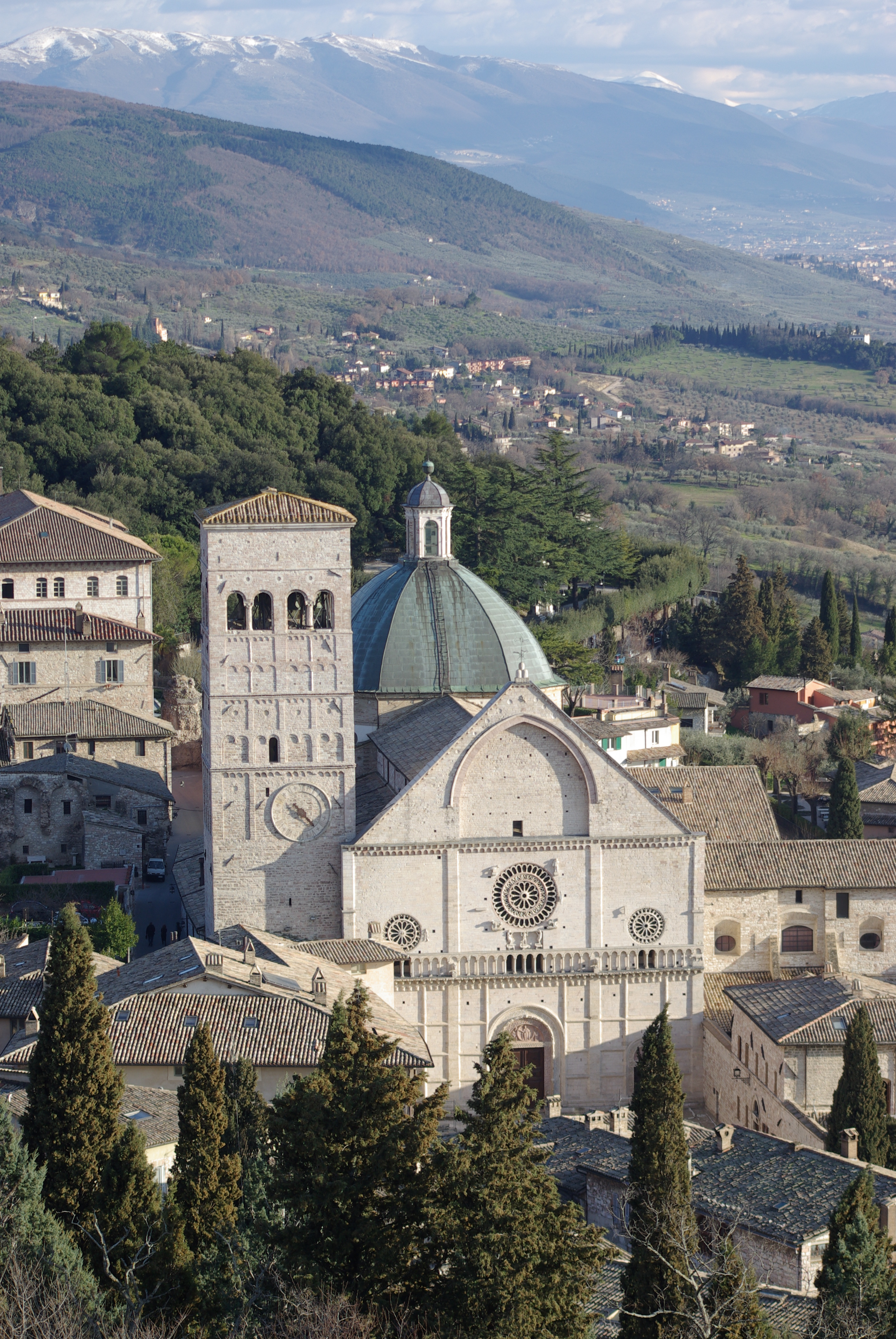
Assisi Cathedral. The Bishop of Assisi established the Assisi Network, in which the churches, monasteries and convents of Assisi served as a safe haven for several hundred Jews during the German occupation.

Gilbert wrote that, in October 1943, with the SS occupying Rome and determined to deport the city's 5000 Jews, the Vatican clergy had opened the sanctuaries of the Vatican to all "non-Aryans" in need of rescue in an attempt to forestall the deportation. "Catholic clergy in the city acted with alacrity", wrote Gilbert. "At the Capuchin convent on the Via Siciliano, Father Benoit, under the name of Father Benedetti, saved a large number of Jews by providing them with false identification papers [...] by the morning of October 16, a total of 4,238 Jews had been given sanctuary in the many monasteries and convents of Rome. A further 477 Jews had been given shelter in the Vatican and its enclaves." Gilbert credited the "rapid rescue efforts" of the Church as saving over four-fifths of Roman Jews that morning. Il Collegio San Giuseppe - Istituto De Merode, like other Roman Catholic schools, hid numerous Jewish children and adults among its students and Brothers.

From his Vatican office, and in co-operation with Pius XII, Monsignor Hugh O'Flaherty, an Irishman, operated an escape operation for Jews and Allied escapees. The Irish Independent credited him with having saved more than 6,500 people during the war. From 1943, he began to offer shelter to allied servicemen seeking sanctuary in the Vatican. Using fake documents and a clandestine communications network, O'Flaherty defied the Gestapo's war criminal commander of Rome, Herbert Kappler, and evaded capture through the German occupation of Rome. O'Flaherty's '"Rome Escape Line" hid British and American soldiers and Jews in safe houses around the city. Kappler had a white line drawn around the boundary of the Vatican and offered a bounty on O'Flaherty's head. O'Flaherty forgave Kappler after the war, and became a regular visitor to his prison cell - eventually presiding at his conversion to Catholicism. O'Flaherty's story was dramatized in the 1983 film The Scarlet and the Black, and Ireland honours his work with the Hugh O'Flaherty International Humanitarian Award.

Swedish-born Elisabeth Hesselblad was listed among the "Righteous" by Yad Vashem for her religious institute's work assisting Jews. She and two British women, Mother Riccarda Beauchamp Hambrough and Sister Katherine Flanagan, have been beatified for reviving the Swedish Bridgettine Order of nuns and hiding scores of Jewish families in their convent during Rome's period of occupation under the Nazis.

The churches, monasteries and convents of Assisi formed the Assisi Network and served as a safe haven for Jews. Gilbert credits the network, established by Bishop Giuseppe Placido Nicolini and Abbott Rufino Niccaci of the Franciscan Monastery, with saving 300 people. When the Nazis began rounding up Jews, Monsignor Nicolini, Bishop of Assisi, ordered Father Aldo Brunacci to lead a rescue operation, arranging sheltering places in 26 monasteries and convents and providing false papers for transit. Respect for Jewish religious practices saw Yom Kippur celebrated at Assisi in 1943, with nuns preparing the meal to end the fast. Other Italian clerics honored by Yad Vashem include the theology professor Fr Giuseppe Girotti of Dominican Seminary of Turin, who saved many Jews before being arrested and sent to Dacau, where he died in 1945; Fr Arrigo Beccari, who protected around 100 Jewish children in his seminary and among local farmers in the village of Nonantola in Central Italy; and Don Gaetano Tantalo, a parish priest who sheltered a large Jewish family. Sister Marguerite Bernes collaborated with Prati parish priest Father Antonio Dressino to hide Jewish refugees. Of Italy's 44,500 Jews, some 7,680 were murdered in the Nazi Holocaust.

== See also ==
- Catholic resistance to the Holocaust
- Pope Pius XII and the Holocaust
- Pope Pius XII and the German Resistance
- List of individuals and groups assisting Jews during the Holocaust
- Rescue of Jews by Poles during the Holocaust
- Catholic Church and Nazi Germany
- Catholic Church and Nazi Germany during World War II
- Catholic clergy involvement with the Ustaše
- Nazi persecution of the Catholic Church

== Sources ==
- Phayer, Michael (2000). The Catholic Church and the Holocaust, 1930–1965. Bloomington and Indianapolis: Indiana University Press. ISBN 978-0-253-33725-2.
- Phayer, Michael (2008). Pius XII, the Holocaust, and the Cold War. Bloomington and Indianapolis: Indiana University Press. ISBN 978-0-253-34930-9.
- Gilbert, Martin (2002). The Righteous - The Unsung Heroes of the Holocaust. Doubleday. ISBN 0-385-60100-X.
