= Three Popes and the Jews =

1967 book by Pinchas Lapide

Three Popes and the Jews is a 1967 book by Pinchas Lapide, a former Israeli Consul to Milan, who at the time of publication was a deputy editor in the Israeli Prime Minister's press office. The "three popes" are Pope Pius XII (1939–1958), Pope John XXIII (1958–1963), and Pope Paul VI (1963–1978).

== Reviews ==
The Catholic Herald in its review of the book observed, "The intentions of Mr. Lapide, deputy editor of the Prime Minister's press office in Israel and a pioneer of inter-faith relations, are so excellent that the reviewer finds it embarrassing to point out mistakes. These cast some doubt on the accuracy of the facts and figures of the rescue operations given later in great detail." The Roman Catholic periodical The Tablet observed "Embarrassed enquirers into the alleged "guilty silence" of the papacy over the Nazi extermination of the Jews have had to wait rather long for a comprehensive, well-documented and almost unreserved vindication."

Rabbi David G. Dalin in The Myth of Hitler's Pope calls the book "meticulously researched and comprehensive" as well as "the definitive work by a Jewish scholar on the subject".

Holocaust historian Dr. Susan Zuccotti calls the work "consistently erroneous" as well as "replete with egregious mistakes and distortions". Lapide's work makes many claims to which he himself claims to have been the witness, but also makes other claims, generally without citing sources. One of Lapide's main goals as Consul to Milan was Vatican recognition of the State of Israel, and Zuccotti assesses that "memories of past commissions and omissions were readily sacrificed to the goal of constructing a better future".

John Cornwell states that Three Popes is a "formidable and scholarly riposte to those who would paint Pius XII and the Holy See as villains but it carried the taint of diplomatic self-interest". For example, the book ends with an alleged quotation from "Papa Roncalli" to Maurice Fisher, the Israeli ambassador in Rome, that "I would recognize the State of Israel here and now".

== Use by defenders of Pius XII ==
The book is the source of many claims made by defenders of Pope Pius XII about his attempts to save Jews during The Holocaust. In Under His Very Windows: The Vatican and the Holocaust in Italy, Zuccotti traces a variety of claims by Pius XII's defenders (cited or uncited) back to Lapide. Roth and Ritner criticize defenders of Pius XII such as Rychlak, Dalin, and William Doino, for drawing on "problematic sources such as Pinchas Lapide"; they note that the book is "filled with errors" and "cited endlessly by papal defenders".

The most famous and widely quoted (and misquoted) claim of Lapide is that "The Catholic Church, under the pontificate of Pius XII was instrumental in saving at least 700,000 but probably as many as 860,000 Jews from certain death at Nazi hands" (pp. 214–215). Lapide claimed to have reached this number by subtracting "all reasonable claims of rescue made by the Protestant Churches [...] as well as those saved by Communists, self-described agnostics and other non-Christian Gentiles" from his estimate of 1,300,000 European Jewish survivors of the Holocaust. Lapide gives no calculation or documentation for this figure. Even José M. Sánchez, himself a defender of Pius XII, states that "the undocumented calculation and suggestive wording have been ignored by Pius's defenders. Their uncritical acceptance of Lapide's statistics and statements has weakened their arguments".

The book also contains a quotation allegedly from Pope John XXIII (well known for his own efforts to save Jews) that "In all these painful matters I have referred to the Holy See and simply carried out the Pope's orders: first and foremost to save human lives" (p. 181). Lapide claims that Roncalli personally made this statement to him in 1957 in Venice, although there are no other witnesses. This quote is repeatedly uncritically by Ronald J. Rychlak among others, although Rychlak alters it to say "Jewish lives" instead of "human lives".

Lapide also claims a similar quotation by Pope Paul VI (again repeated by Rychlak), allegedly refusing an award from an Italian Jewish delegation because "All I did was my duty. And besides I only acted upon orders from the Holy Father. Nobody deserves a medal for that." The source for this quote is again only Lapide (p. 137), but this time he does not claim to be an eyewitness. Zuccotti regards this anecdote as unconvincing because "there is little evidence that [Paul VI] ever did much for the Jews" and the ADSS even contains examples of his refusing requests for assistance. The quote is also inconsistent with his 1963 article in The Tablet defending Pius XII which claims not that he directed others to save Jews, but that he refrained because it would have been "not only futile but harmful".
