= The Myth of Hitler's Pope =

2005 book by David G. Dalin

The Myth of Hitler's Pope: How Pope Pius XII Rescued Jews from the Nazis
- Cover
- Author: David G. Dalin
- Language: English
- Subject: Pope Pius XII
- Publisher: Regnery Publishing
- Publication date: 2005
- Publication place: United States
- Media type: Print
- Pages: 209
- ISBN: 978-0895260345

The Myth of Hitler's Pope: How Pope Pius XII Rescued Jews from the Nazis is a 2005 book by American historian and Rabbi David G. Dalin. It was published by Regnery Publishing.

== Background ==
In 2001 Joseph Bottum, the Literary Editor of The Weekly Standard, commissioned Dalin to write an omnibus review article on the books relating to Pope Pius XII, who was the center of controversy in the wake of John Cornwell's book Hitler's Pope.

Published in February 2001, Dalin's essay (later expanded into the book) concluded that Pope Pius XII was a Righteous Gentile who saved hundreds of thousands of lives during the Holocaust. Bottum stated that the essay "went far beyond any claim I had been willing to make", though he did not say whether he disagreed with any of the claims in the essay, and also noted that one New York Times reviewer who "responded in the way I had supposed most would" and "grumbled a little but eventually concluded the claims about Pius XII were overwrought and Dalin was basically right: the Pope did "more than most to shelter Jews".

Dalin's book, The Myth of Hitler's Pope, has been translated into Italian, French, Spanish, Portuguese and Polish.

== Contents ==
Dalin first presents evidence to support his contention that many popes through history have defended the Jews, and that they have refuted attacks like the blood libel.

Then he gets to the main part of the book: defending the reputation of the late Pope Pius XII by presenting extensive documentation collated from Church and State archives throughout Europe. Rabbi Dalin suggests that Yad Vashem might honor Pope Pius XII as a "Righteous Gentile", and documents that Pius was praised by many Jewish leaders of his day for his role in saving more Jews than Schindler. Pius's admirers included Chief Rabbi Yitzhak HaLevi Herzog of Pre-State Palestine and then later the State of Israel, Israeli Prime Ministers Golda Meir and Moshe Sharett, and Israel's first president Chaim Weizmann.

Dalin also presents Albert Einstein as one of the Jews who praised Pius XII, writing that Einstein "paid tribute to the 'courage' of Pope Pius and the Catholic Church" in a 23 December 1940 article in Time magazine.

Dalin writes:

anti-papal polemics of ex-seminarians like Garry Wills and John Cornwell (author of Hitler's Pope), of ex-priests like James Carroll, and or other lapsed or angry liberal Catholics exploit the tragedy of the Jewish people during the Holocaust to foster their own political agenda of forcing changes on the Catholic Church today.

Dalin also argues that there really was a "Hitler's cleric", Hajj Amin al-Husseini, the Grand Mufti of Jerusalem, who spent the war with Hitler, was a friend of Adolf Eichmann, and later became the mentor of Yasser Arafat.

== Reviews ==
In the July/August 2006 issue of The American Spectator, historian Martin Gilbert, the official biographer of Winston Churchill and the author of ten books on the Holocaust, writes: "Building on earlier, documented defenses of Pius XII...[ Dalin ] builds a powerful case for Pius XII, suggesting that the desire of Pope John Paul II to canonize Pius need not have been offensive -- or insensitive -- to Jews, as it was widely portrayed." Gilbert asserts that "Professor Dalin's book is an essential contribution to our understanding of the reality of Pope Pius XII's support for Jews at their time of greatest danger."

Francis Phillips of The Jerusalem Post wrote: "(This) book, which is robust, polemical and argumentative, deploys much documentation to show that the portrayal of the pope as a Nazi sympathizer and anti-Semite is at best grotesque, at worst deliberately false... Dalin has done an excellent job in defending the wartime record of Pius XII... Because of the author's scholarly research, it is to be hoped that history in the long term will be kinder to the reputation of a man maligned."

== See also ==
- Catholic resistance to Nazi Germany
- Pope Pius XII and the German Resistance
- Rescue of Jews by Catholics during the Holocaust

== Notes ==
- Goldhagenizing the Catholic Church, Paul Gottfried (18 January 2002)
- The Defamation of Pope Pius XII, Tom Woods (25 July 2005)
- Gilbert, Martin, "Hitler's Pope?," The American Spectator, http://spectator.org/articles/46578/hitlers-pope (July/August 2006)
- Lapomarda, Vincent A., "Not Hitler's Pope," New Oxford Review, October 2000, and "Pius XII as 'Phayer's Pope'," New Oxford Review, April 2009
