= Pope Pius XII and the German resistance =

Overview of the relationship between Pope Pius XII and the German resistance in WW2

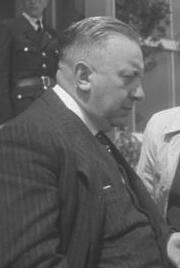
Josef Müller was sent to Rome in 1939 by the German resistance, to seek assistance from the Pope in a plot to overthrow Hitler.

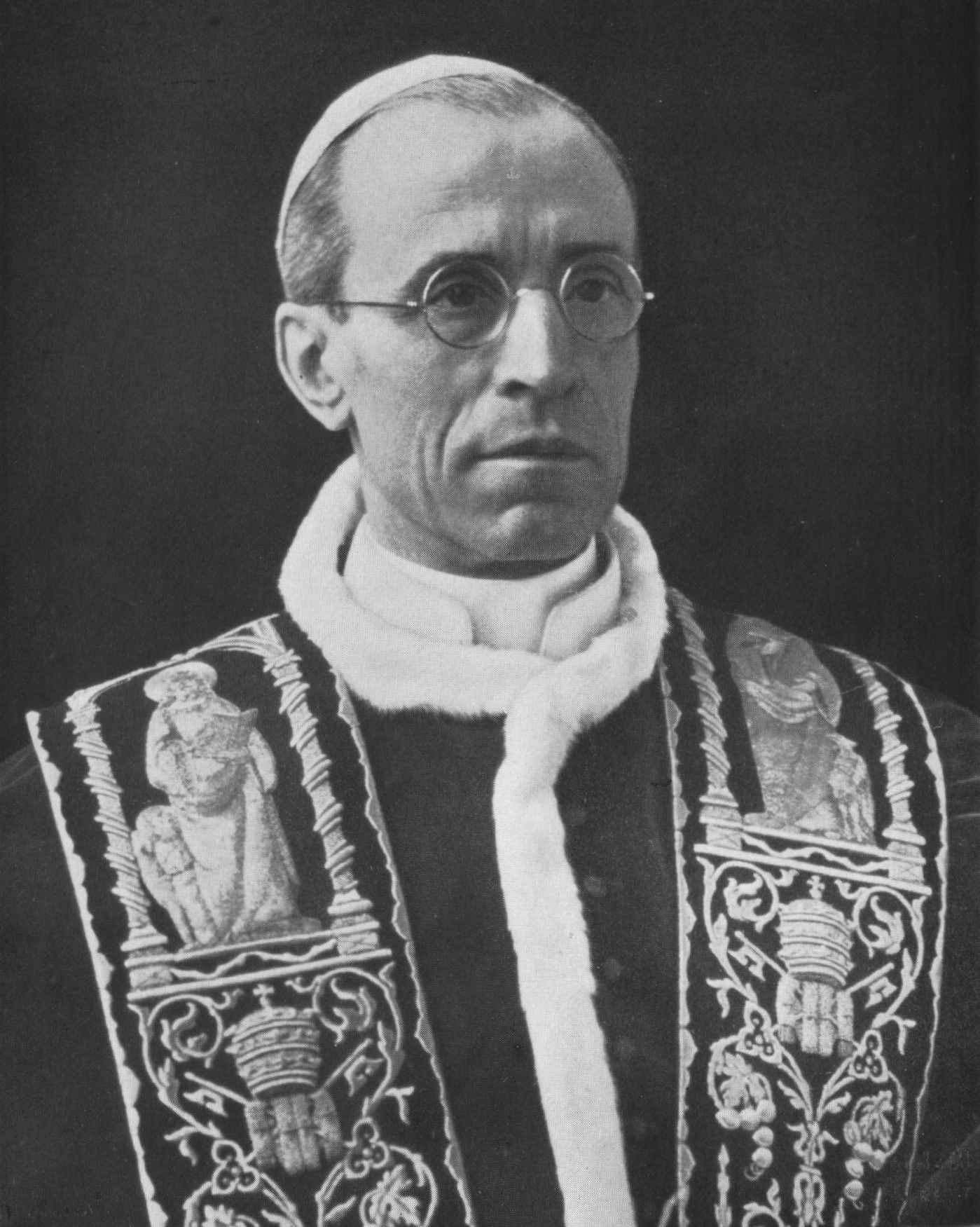
Pope Pius XII secretly acted as an intermediary between the German resistance and the Allies during preparations for the coup.

During the Second World War, Pope Pius XII maintained links to the German resistance to Nazism against Adolf Hitler's Nazi regime. Although remaining publicly neutral, Pius advised the British in 1940 of the readiness of certain German generals to overthrow Hitler if they could be assured of an honourable peace, offered assistance to the German resistance in the event of a coup, and warned the Allies of the planned German invasion of the Low Countries in 1940. The Nazis considered that the Pope had engaged in acts equivalent to espionage.

== Background ==
The Army was the only organisation in Germany with the capacity to overthrow the government; from within it, a small number of officers came to present the most serious threat posed to the Nazi regime. The Foreign Office and the Abwehr (Military Intelligence) of the Oberkommando der Wehrmacht (Supreme Command of the Armed Forces) also provided vital support to the movement. Hitler's 1938 purge of the military was accompanied by increased militancy in the Nazification of Germany, a sharp intensification of the persecution of Jews and daring foreign policy exploits. With Germany brought to the brink of war, the German Resistance then emerged.

Pius XII assumed the papacy in 1939. In the buildup to war, he sought to act as a peace broker. As the Holy See had done during the pontificate of Benedict XV (1914–1922) during World War I, the Vatican, under Pius XII, pursued a policy of diplomatic neutrality through World War II. Pius XII, like Benedict XV, described the position as "impartiality", rather than "neutrality". Pius XII's relations with the Axis and the Allied forces may have been impartial, but early in the war, he shared intelligence with the Allies about the German Resistance and the planned invasion of the Low Countries and lobbied Mussolini to stay neutral.

== Pope and resistance ==
With Poland overrun but France and the Low Countries yet to be attacked, the German resistance wanted the Pope's assistance in preparations for a coup to oust Hitler. Colonel Hans Oster, the deputy head of the German counterespionage bureau (Abwehr), was a key figure in the German military opposition to Hitler. He passed information to the Dutch of a planned invasion of the Low Countries in November 1939 and supported General Ludwig Beck in instructing Abwehr officer Josef Müller to go to Rome to warn the Allies, through the Pope, of the planned invasion. Müller was sent on the clandestine trip to Rome to seek papal assistance in the developing plot by the German military opposition to oust Hitler.

=== Josef Müller mission ===
In the winter of 1939–1940, the Bavarian lawyer and reserve 'Abwehr' officer Josef Müller, acting as an emissary for the early German military opposition against Hitler then centered on General Franz Halder, the chief of staff of the German army, contacted Monsignore Ludwig Kaas, the exiled leader of the German Catholic Zentrum party, in Rome, hoping to use the Pope as an intermediary to contact the British. Kaas put Müller in contact with Father Robert Leiber, who personally asked the Pope to relay the information about the German resistance to the British. Müller had known the Pope since his time as nuncio in Munich, and they had stayed in contact. The Pope's Private Secretary, Robert Leiber, acted as the intermediary between Pius and the Resistance. He met with Müller, who visited Rome in 1939 and 1940.

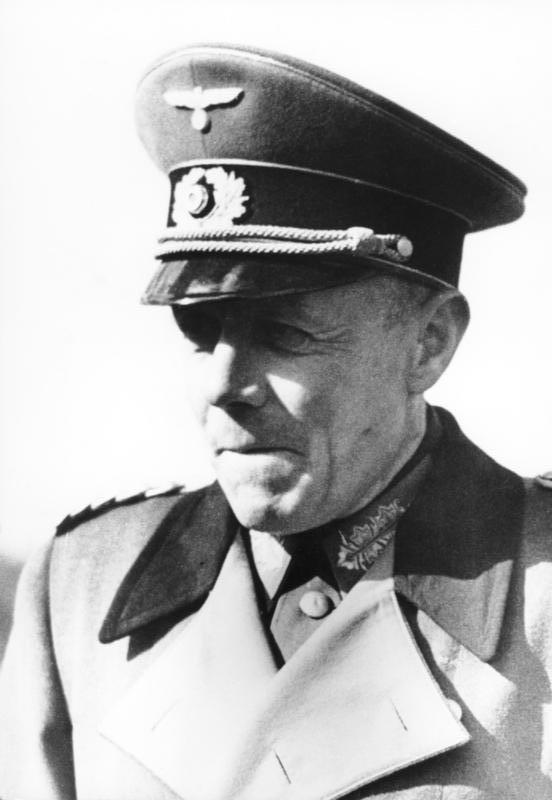
Colonel General Ludwig Beck, a key figure in the German resistance, secretly advised the Pope of plots against Hitler through emissaries.

=== Plot against Hitler ===
The Vatican considered Müller to be a representative of Colonel-General Ludwig Beck and agreed to offer the machinery for mediation. Oster, Wilhelm Canaris, and Hans von Dohnányi, backed Beck, told Müller to ask Pius to ascertain whether the British would enter negotiations with the German opposition which wanted to overthrow Hitler. The British agreed to negotiate if the Vatican could vouch for the opposition's representative. Pius, communicating with Britain's D'Arcy Osborne, channelled communications back and forth in secrecy. The Vatican agreed to send a letter outlining the basis for peace with England, and the participation of the Pope was used to try to persuade senior German Generals Halder and Brauchitsch to act against Hitler.

Negotiations were tense, with a Western offensive expected, and on the basis that substantive negotiations required the replacement of the Hitler regime. Hoffmann wrote that when the Venlo Incident stalled the talks, the British agreed to resume discussions primarily because of the "efforts of the Pope and the respect in which he was held. Chamberlain and Halifax set great store by the Pope's readiness to mediate".

The British government had doubts as to the capacity of the conspirators. On 7 February, the Pope updated Osborne that the opposition wanted to replace the Nazi regime with a democratic federation but hoped to retain Austria and the Sudetenland. The British government was noncommittal and said that while the federal model was of interest, the promises and sources of the opposition were too vague. Nevertheless, the resistance were encouraged by the talks, and Müller told Leiber that a coup would occur in February. Pius appeared to continue to hope for a coup in Germany into March 1940.

=== Pope warns of imminent invasion ===
On 3 May, Müller told Leiber that the invasion of the Netherlands and Belgium was imminent, that Switzerland might also be attacked and that paratroops would probably be deployed. On 4 May 1940, the Vatican advised the Netherlands envoy to the Vatican that the Germans planned to invade France through the Netherlands and Belgium on May 10.

With the blessing of the Pope, the Vatican sent a coded radio message to its nuncios in Brussels and The Hague. The messages were intercepted by the Nazis, and Canaris was instructed to investigate his own leak. Canaris then ordered Müller back to Rome to investigate the source of the leak.

On 6 May, the Pope discussed the imminent attack with the Italian King's son, Crown Prince Umberto, and his wife, Princess Maria Jose. Umberto asked Mussolini about the plan and was told it was untrue, but Maria Jose advised her brother King Leopold III of Belgium and was in turn advised by the Belgian ambassador that the idea was a piece of misinformation, spread by a German spy. According to Peter Hebblethwaite, the Germans "regarded the Pope's behaviour as equivalent to espionage".

Hitler was shown two decoded telegrams sent to Brussels by the Belgian Ambassador to the Vatican on May 7 but was not dissuaded from his intention to invade. Alfred Jodl noted in his diary that the Germans knew that the Belgian envoy to the Vatican had been tipped off and that the Fuehrer was greatly agitated by the danger of treachery. The German invasion of the Low Countries followed on 10 May, and Belgium, the Netherlands and Luxembourg were quickly overwhelmed.

Pius then further displeased the Axis powers by sending condolences to the sovereigns of Belgium, the Netherlands and Luxembourg, and Giovanni Montini (later Pope Paul VI) noted that when challenged by the Italian Ambassador, Pius replied that he would not be intimidated by threats and would "not be in the least afraid of falling into hostile hands or going to a concentration camp".

=== After the Fall of France ===
Following the Fall of France, peace overtures continued to emanate from the Vatican as well as Sweden and the United States to which Churchill responded resolutely that Germany would first have to free its conquered territories. The negotiations ultimately proved fruitless. Hitler's swift victories over France and the Low Countries deflated the will of the German military to resist Hitler.

The activities of the Abwehr Military Intelligence resistance group around Hans Oster came under Gestapo surveillance by 1942, and Himmler was keen to shut down the rival security service. Dohnanyi, arrested in April 1943, had had papers on his desk intended for transmission to Rome by Müller, to update the Vatican on setbacks faced by the Resistance. Müller was arrested, as were Dietrich Bonhoeffer and his sister, Christel Dohnanyi. Oster was stood down, and placed under house arrest. Müller spent the rest of the war in concentration camps, ending up at Dachau.

The raid marked a serious blow to the Resistance, which had started preparations for the 1944 July Plot coup d'état, amid growing support for their cause and ever-diminishing prospects for a German victory in the war. Following the arrests, Beck's first order was for an account of the incidents to be sent to the Pope. Hans Bernd Gisevius was sent in place of Müller to advise of the developments and met with Leiber.

== See also ==
- Catholic Church and Nazi Germany
- Catholic resistance to Nazi Germany
- Pope Pius XII and the Holocaust
