= List of encyclicals of Pope Pius XII =

1939–1958 papal encyclicals

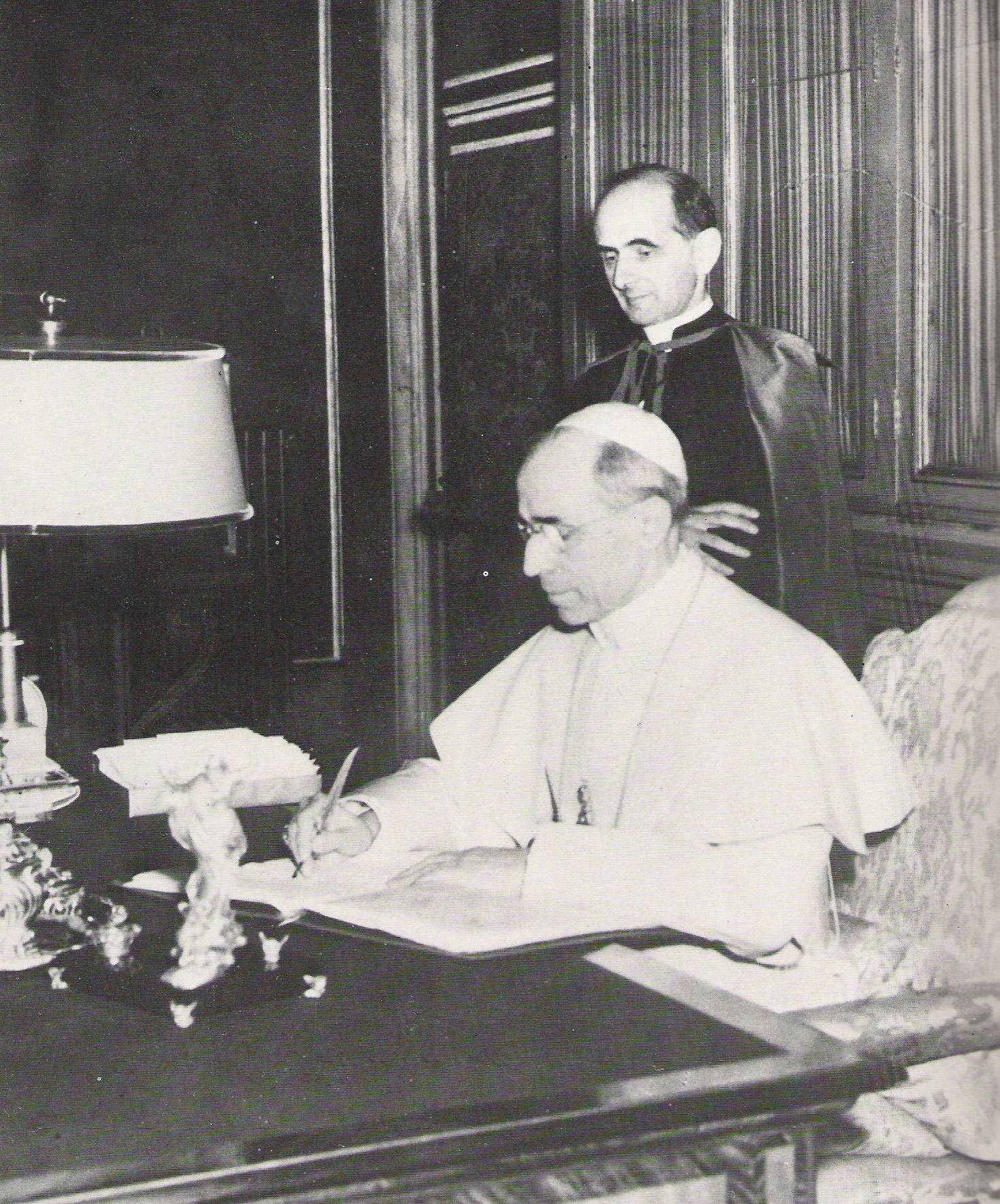
Pope Pius XII in his private office. Behind him is Monsignor Giovanni Battista Montini, the future Pope Paul VI

This is a list of encyclicals of Pope Pius XII. Pius XII promulgated 41 papal encyclicals, during his reign as pope for over 19 years, from his election of March 2, 1939, until his death on October 9, 1958. The 41 encyclicals of Pius XII exceed the 32 encyclicals written by all his successors (John XXIII, Paul VI, John Paul I, John Paul II, and Benedict XVI) during the fifty years that followed (1958–2008).

== Background ==
An encyclical (from Latin encyclia, from the Greek "en kyklo, ἐν κύκλῳ", meaning "general" or "encircling") was a circular letter sent to all the churches of a particular area in the ancient Christian church. For the modern Roman Catholic Church, a Papal Encyclical, in the strictest sense, is a letter sent by the pope which is explicitly addressed to Roman Catholic bishops of a particular area or to the world, usually treating some aspect of Catholic doctrine. A Papal Encyclical is generally used for significant issues, and is second in importance only to the highest-ranking document now issued by popes, an Apostolic Constitution.

The title of a Papal Encyclical is usually taken from its first few words.

== View of Pope Pius XII ==
Pope Pius XII held that papal encyclicals, even when they are not ex cathedra, can nonetheless be sufficiently authoritative to end theological debate on a particular question. He wrote in Humani generis:

It is not to be thought that what is set down in Encyclical letters does not demand assent in itself, because in this the popes do not exercise the supreme power of their magisterium. For these matters are taught by the ordinary magisterium, regarding which the following is pertinent: "He who heareth you, heareth Me." (Luke 10:16); and usually what is set forth and inculcated in Encyclical Letters, already pertains to Catholic doctrine. But if the Supreme Pontiffs in their acts, after due consideration, express an opinion on a hitherto controversial matter, it is clear to all that this matter, according to the mind and will of the same Pontiffs, cannot any longer be considered a question of free discussion among theologians.

== The use of encyclicals by Pius XII ==
Encyclicals indicate high Papal priority for an issue at a given time. Only pontiffs define when, and under which circumstances encyclicals should be issued. They may choose to issue an apostolic constitution, bull, encyclical, apostolic letter or give a papal speech. Pontiffs differ on the use of encyclicals. On the issue of birth control and contraception, for example, Pope Pius XI issued the encyclical Casti connubii, while Pope Pius XII spoke to midwives and the medical profession when he clarified his position on the issue. Pope Paul VI published an encyclical Humanae vitae on the same topic. On matters of war and peace, Pope Pius XII issued ten encyclicals, most of them after 1945, three of them (Datis nuperrime, Sertum laetitiae, and Luctuosissimi eventus) protesting the Soviet invasion and crackdown of the Hungarian revolution in 1956. Pope Paul VI spoke about the war in Vietnam and Pope John Paul II, issued his protest against the war in Iraq in speeches. On social issues, Pope Leo XIII promulgated Rerum novarum, followed by Quadragesimo anno by Pius XI, and Centesimus annus by John Paul II. Pius XII spoke on the same topic to a consistory of cardinals in his Christmas messages and to numerous academic and professional associations. The magisterium of Pius XII is therefore significantly larger than the 41 encyclicals listed above. Most of his detailed teachings are in his papal speeches on specific topics such as:

- Conscience, guilt and fair punishment,
- Ethics of psychological research,
- Farmers,
- Fashion industry,
- Formation of conscience,
- Genetic research,
- Human dignity,
- Medical doctors and the use of weapons,
- Military medical research.

== The encyclicals of Pius XII ==
No.	Title		Subject	Date	Text
No.	Latin	English translation	Subject	Date	Text
1.	Summi Pontificatus	"On the Supreme Pontificate"	On the Unity of Human Society	October 20, 1939	(English)
2.	Sertum laetitiae	"The Crown of Joy"	On the 150th Anniversary of the establishment of the hierarchy in the United States	November 1, 1939	(English)
3.	Saeculo Exeunte Octavo	"At the Completion of the Eighth Century"	On the 800th anniversary of the Independence of Portugal	June 13, 1940	(English)
4.	Mystici corporis Christi	"On the Mystical Body of Christ"	On the Mystical Body of Christ and the Church	June 29, 1943	(English)
5.	Divino afflante Spiritu	"Inspired by the Divine Spirit"	On Sacred Scripture	September 30, 1943	(English)
6.	Orientalis Ecclesiae	"Of the Eastern Church"	On St. Cyril, Patriarch of Alexandria	April 9, 1944	(English)
7.	Communium interpretes dolorum	"Interpreter of the universal anguish"	On Ending the Second World War	April 15, 1945	(English)
8.	Orientales omnes Ecclesias	"All the Eastern Churches"	On the 350th Anniversary of Reunion of the Ruthenian Church with Rome	December 23, 1945	(English)
9.	Quemadmodum	"In What Manner"	On Pleading for Care for the World's Destitute Children	January 6, 1946	(English)
10.	Deiparae Virginis Mariae	"Of the Blessed Virgin Mary"	Should We Define the Assumption?	May 1, 1946	(English)
11.	Fulgens radiatur	"The radiant light"	On the Brilliant Light of Saint Benedict	March 21, 1947	(English)
12.	Mediator Dei	"Mediator of God"	On the Sacred Liturgy	November 20, 1947	(English)
13.	Optatissima pax	"Longed-for peace"	On Prescribing Public Prayers for Social and World Peace	December 18, 1947	(English)
14.	Auspicia quaedam	"Some auspices"	Prayers for World Peace and the Solution Of The Problems Of Palestine	May 1, 1948	(English)
15.	In multiplicibus curis	"Among the multiple preoccupations"	On Prayers for Peace in Palestine	October 24, 1948	(English)
16.	Redemptoris nostri cruciatus	"The Passion of Our Redeemer"	On Holy Places in Palestine	April 15, 1949	(English)
17.	Anni sacri	"On the Holy Year"	On a Program For Combating Atheistic Propaganda Throughout The World	March 12, 1950	(English)
18.	Summi maeroris	"With the deepest sorrow"	On a Call for Public Prayers for Peace	July 19, 1950	(English)
19.	Humani generis	"On Human Origin"	Concerning Some False Opinions Threatening to Undermine the Foundations of Catholic Doctrine	August 12, 1950	(English)
20.	Mirabile illud	"That admirable"	On a Crusade for Prayers for Peace	December 6, 1950	(English)
21.	Evangelii praecones	"Toiling missionaries"	On the Promotion of Catholic Missions	June 2, 1951	(English)
22.	Sempiternus Rex Christus	"Christ, the Eternal King"	On the Council of Chalcedon	September 8, 1951	(English)
23.	Ingruentium malorum	"Approaching evil"	On Reciting the Rosary	September 15, 1951	(English)
24.	Orientales Ecclesias	"The Oriental Churches"	On The Persecuted Eastern Church and describing the hopeless situation of the faithful in Bulgaria	December 15, 1952	(English)
25.	Doctor Mellifluus	"Sweet Doctor"	On St. Bernard of Clairvaux, Last of the Fathers	May 24, 1953	(English)
26.	Fulgens corona	"The radiant crown"	Proclaiming a Marian Year to Commemorate the Centenary of the Definition of the Dogma of the Immaculate Conception	September 8, 1953	(English)
27.	Sacra virginitas	"On Holy Virginity"	On Consecrated Virginity	March 25, 1954	(English)
28.	Ecclesiae fastos	"History of the Church"	On Saint Boniface	June 5, 1954	(English)
29.	Ad Sinarum gentem	"To the Chinese people"	On the Supranationality of the Church	October 7, 1954	(English)
30.	Ad Caeli Reginam	"To the Queen of Heaven"	On Proclaiming the Queenship of Mary	October 11, 1954	(English)
31.	Musicae sacrae	"Of Sacred Music"	On Sacred Music	December 25, 1955	(English)
32.	Haurietis aquas	"You shall draw waters"	On Devotion to the Sacred Heart	May 15, 1956	(English)
33.	Luctuosissimi eventus	"Sorrowful events"	Urging Public Prayers for Peace and Freedom for the People of Hungary	October 28, 1956	(English)
34.	Laetamur admodum	"We are most pleased"	Renewing Exhortation for Prayers for Peace in Poland, Hungary, and the Middle East	November 1, 1956	(English)
35.	Datis nuperrime	"In the recent encyclical"	Lamenting the Sorrowful Events in Hungary, and Condemning the Ruthless Use of Force	November 5, 1956	(English)
36.	Fidei donum	"The gift of faith"	On the Present Condition of the Catholic Missions, especially in Africa	April 21, 1957	(English)
37.	Invicti athletae	"Of the unconquered athlete"	On St. Andrew Bobola	May 16, 1957	(English)
38.	Le pèlerinage de Lourdes	"Of the pilgrimage to Lourdes"	Warning Against Materialism on the Centenary of the Apparitions at Lourdes	July 2, 1957	(English)
39.	Miranda prorsus	"Remarkable Advance"	On the Communications Fields: Motion Pictures, Radio, Television	September 8, 1957	(English)
40.	Ad Apostolorum principis	"At the Prince of the Apostles"	On Communism and the Church in China	June 29, 1958	(English)
41.	Meminisse iuvat	"It is helpful to recall"	On Prayers for the Persecuted Church	July 14, 1958	(English)
