= Catholic Church and Nazi Germany during World War II =

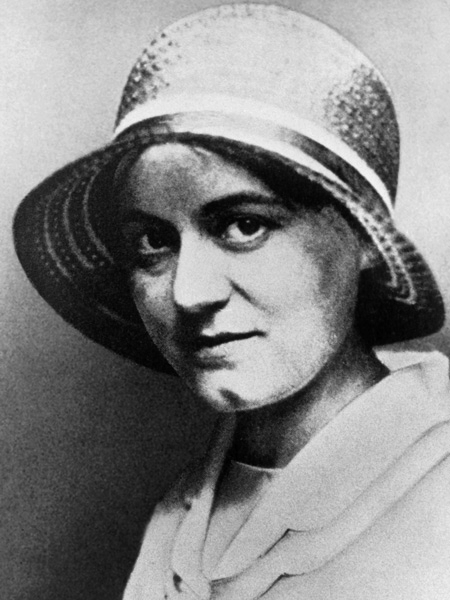
The German nun and saint Edith Stein. Ethnically Jewish, she was arrested at a Netherlands convent and murdered in the gas chambers at Auschwitz, following a protest by Dutch bishops against the abduction of Jews.

Several Catholic countries and populations fell under Nazi domination during the period of the Second World War (1939–1945), and ordinary Catholics fought on both sides of the conflict. Despite efforts to protect its rights within Germany under a 1933 Reichskonkordat treaty, the Church in Germany had faced persecution in the years since Adolf Hitler had seized power, and Pope Pius XI accused the Nazi government of sowing 'fundamental hostility to Christ and his Church'. The concordat has been described by some as giving moral legitimacy to the Nazi regime soon after Hitler had acquired quasi-dictatorial powers through the Enabling Act of 1933, an Act itself facilitated through the support of the Catholic Centre Party. Pius XII became Pope on the eve of war and lobbied world leaders to prevent the outbreak of conflict. His first encyclical, Summi Pontificatus, called the invasion of Poland an "hour of darkness". He affirmed the policy of Vatican neutrality, but maintained links to the German Resistance. Despite being the only world leader to publicly and specifically denounce Nazi crimes against Jews in his 1942 Christmas Address, controversy surrounding his apparent reluctance to speak frequently and in even more explicit terms about Nazi crimes continues. He used diplomacy to aid war victims, lobbied for peace, shared intelligence with the Allies, and employed Vatican Radio and other media to speak out against atrocities like race murders. In Mystici corporis Christi (1943) he denounced the murder of the handicapped. A denunciation from German bishops of the murder of the "innocent and defenceless", including "people of a foreign race or descent", followed.

Hitler's invasion of Catholic Poland sparked the War. Nazi policy towards the Church was at its most severe in the areas it annexed to the Reich, such as the Czech and Slovene lands, Austria and Poland. In Polish territories it annexed to Greater Germany, the Nazis set about systematically dismantling the Church—arresting its leaders, exiling its clergymen, closing its churches, monasteries and convents. Many clergymen were murdered. Over 1800 Catholic Polish clergy were murdered in concentration camps; most notably, Saint Maximilian Kolbe. Nazi security chief Reinhard Heydrich soon orchestrated an intensification of restrictions on church activities in Germany. Hitler and his ideologues Goebbels, Himmler, Rosenberg and Bormann hoped to de-Christianize Germany in the long term. With the expansion of the war in the East, expropriation of monasteries, convents and church properties surged from 1941. Clergy were persecuted and sent to concentration camps, religious Orders had their properties seized, some youth were sterilized. The first priest to die was Aloysius Zuzek. Bishop August von Galen's ensuing 1941 denunciation of Nazi euthanasia and defence of human rights roused rare popular dissent. The German bishops denounced Nazi policy towards the church in pastoral letters, calling it "unjust oppression".

From 1940, the Nazis gathered priest-dissidents in dedicated clergy barracks at Dachau, where (95%) of its 2,720 inmates were Catholic (mostly Poles, and 411 Germans), 1,034 were murdered there. Mary Fulbrook wrote that when politics encroached on the church, German Catholics were prepared to resist, but the record was otherwise patchy and uneven with notable exceptions, "it seems that, for many Germans, adherence to the Christian faith proved compatible with at least passive acquiescence in, if not active support for, the Nazi dictatorship". Influential members of the German Resistance included Jesuits of the Kreisau Circle and laymen such as July plotters Klaus von Stauffenberg, Jakob Kaiser and Bernhard Letterhaus, whose faith inspired resistance. Elsewhere, vigorous resistance from bishops such as Johannes de Jong and Jules-Géraud Saliège, papal diplomats such as Angelo Rotta, and nuns such as Margit Slachta, can be contrasted with the apathy of others and the outright collaboration of Catholic politicians such as Slovakia's Msgr Jozef Tiso and fanatical Croat nationalists. From within the Vatican, Msgr Hugh O'Flaherty coordinated the rescue of thousands of Allied POWs, and civilians, including Jews. While Nazi antisemitism embraced modern pseudo-scientific racial principles rejected by the Catholic Church, ancient antipathies between Christianity and Judaism contributed to European antisemitism; during the Second World War the Catholic Church rescued many thousands of Jews by issuing false documents, lobbying Axis officials, hiding them in monasteries, convents, schools and elsewhere; including the Vatican and Castel Gandolfo.

== Holocaust ==
By 1941, most Christians in Europe were living under Nazi rule. Generally, the life of their churches could continue, provided they did not attempt to participate in politics. When the Nazi regime undertook the industrialized mass-extermination of the Jews, the Nazis found a great many willing participants. Scholars have undertaken critical examinations of the origins of Nazi antisemitism and while the feelings of European Catholics toward Jews varied considerably, antisemitism was "prevalent throughout Europe". As Geoffrey Blainey wrote, "Christianity could not escape some indirect blame for Holocaust. The Jews and Christians were rivals, sometimes enemies, for a long period of history. Furthermore, it was traditional for Christians to blame Jewish leaders for the crucifixion of Christ ... At the same time, Christians showed devotion and respect. They were conscious of their debt to the Jews. Jesus and all the disciples and all the authors of the gospels were of the Jewish race. Christians viewed the Old Testament, the holy book of the synagogues, as equally a holy book for them". Others too have come under scrutiny, wrote Blainey: "even Jews living in the United States, might have indirectly and directly given more help, or publicity, to the Jews during their plight in Hitler's Europe".

Hamerow writes that sympathy for the Jews was common among Catholic churchmen in the Resistance, who saw both Catholics and Jews as religious minorities exposed to bigotry on the part of the majority. This sympathy led some lay and clergy resistors to speak publicly against the persecution of the Jews, as with the priest who wrote in a periodical in 1934 that it was a sacred task of the church to oppose "sinful racial pride and blind hatred of the Jews". The leadership of the Catholic Church in Germany, however, was generally hesitant to speak out specifically on behalf of the Jews. While racists were rare among the Catholic hierarchy in Germany, the bishops feared protests against the anti-Jewish policies of the regime would invite retaliation against Catholics. The considerable energies expended by the German church in opposing government interference in the churches was not matched in public by protests against the anti-Jewish policies of regime. Such protests as were made tended to be private letters to government ministers.

=== German Catholics and the Holocaust ===
Nazi persecution of the Jews grew steadily worse throughout era of the Third Reich. Hamerow wrote that during the prelude to the Holocaust between Kristallnacht in November 1938 and the 1941 invasion of Soviet Russia, the position of the Jews "deteriorated steadily from disenfranchisement to segregation, ghettoization and sporadic mass murder". The Vatican responded to the Kristallnacht by seeking to find places of refuge for Jews. Pius XII instructed local bishops to help all those in need at the outbreak of the war. According to Kershaw, the "detestation of Nazism was overwhelming within the Catholic Church", yet traditional Christian anti-Judaism offered "no bulwark" against Nazi biological antisemitism, and there was no shortage of antisemitic rhetoric from the clergy: Bishop Buchberger of Regensburg called Nazi racism directed at Jews "justified self-defense" in the face of "overly powerful Jewish capital"; Bishop Hilfrich of Limburg said the true Christian religion "made its way not from the Jews but in spite of them." Still, while clergymen like Cardinal Adolf Bertram favoured a policy of concessions to the Nazi regime, other, like Bishop Preysing of Berlin, called for more concerted opposition.

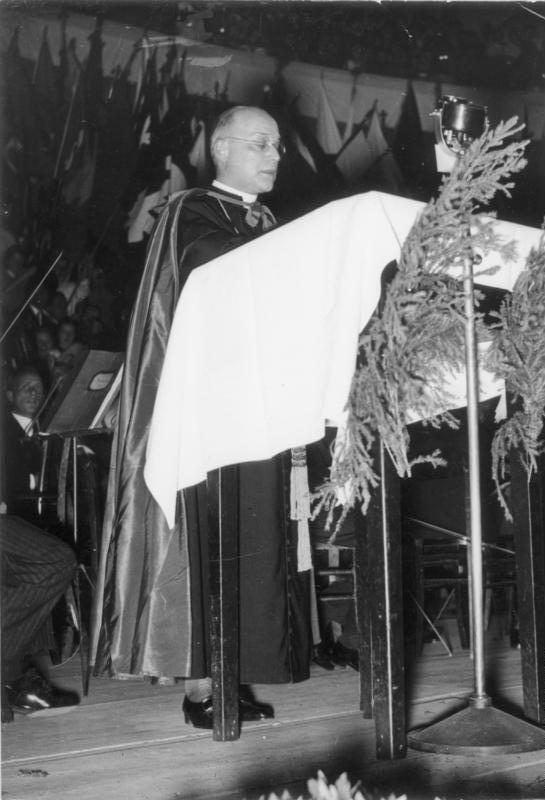
Bishop Konrad von Preysing of Berlin, in 1935. Of Germany's bishops, along with Joseph Frings, he was among the most public of German church leaders in his statements against genocide.

When deportations for the Final Solution commenced, at his Cathedral in Berlin, Fr. Bernhard Lichtenberg offered public prayer and sermonised against the deportations of Jews to the East. He was denounced, and later died en route to Dachau. Nazi ideology saw Jewishness as a "racial question". Among the deported "Jews" of Germany were practicing Catholics. Martin Gilbert notes that at Christmas 1941, with deportations underway, the Polish Łódź Ghetto for "Jews", held Christian services, with the Catholic service conducted by Sister Maria Regina Fuhrmann, a theologian from Vienna. Two newly arrived Catholic priests of "Jewish origin" were among the deportees in attendance. Saint Edith Stein is among the most famous German Jewish-Catholics sent to the death camps by the Nazis.

Faulhaber 1933

Cardinal Faulhaber gained an early reputation as an opponent of the regime denouncing the Nazi extremists who were calling for the Bible to be purged of the "Jewish" Old Testament, because, wrote Hamerow, in seeking to adhere to the central anti-Semitic tenets of Nazism, these "anti-Semitic zealots" were also undermining "the basis of Catholicism". Faulhaber delivered three important Advent sermons in 1933. Entitled Judaism, Christianity, and Germany, the sermons affirmed the Jewish origins of the Christian religion, the continuity of the Old and New Testaments of the Bible, and the importance of the Christian tradition to Germany. The pre-Christian "people of Israel were the bearers of the revelation" and their books were "building stones for God's kingdom". Unlike the Nazis, Faulhaber believed Judaism was a religious not a racial concept. In his private correspondence, his sympathy for the Jews of his own time is clear, but Faulhaber feared that going public with these thoughts would make the struggle against the Jews also a "struggle against the Catholics". Faulhaber's sermons appeared to undermine the central racist tenet of Nazism, but were, in essence, a defence of the church. Similarly, when in 1933, the Nazi school superintendent of Munster issued a decree: religious instruction be combined with discussion of the "demoralising power" of the "people of Israel", Bishop von Galen refused, writing such interference in curriculum was a breach of the Concordat. He feared children would be confused as to their "obligation to act with charity to all men" and the historical mission of the people of Israel. The language of Galen's later 1941 sermons on the "right to life, and inviolability" of all people, did not mention the Jews by name, but had far reaching resonance. He declared himself speaking to protect the "rights of the human personality", not the narrow denominational interests of the Catholic Church.

Kristallnacht 1938

On 11 November 1938, following Kristallnacht, Pius XI joined Western leaders in condemning the pogrom. In response, the Nazis organised mass demonstrations against Catholics and Jews, in Munich. The Bavarian Gauleiter Adolf Wagner declared before 5,000 protesters: "Every utterance the Pope makes in Rome is an incitement of the Jews throughout the world to agitate against Germany". Cardinal Faulhaber supplied a truck to the rabbi of the Ohel Yaakov synagogue, to rescue sacred objects before the building was torn down on Kristallacht. A Nazi mob attacked his palace, and smashed its windows. On 21 November, in an address to the world's Catholics, the Pope rejected the Nazi claim of racial superiority. He insisted there was only a single human race. Robert Ley, the Nazi Minister of Labour declared the following day in Vienna: "No compassion will be tolerated for the Jews. We deny the Pope's statement there is but one human race. The Jews are parasites." Catholic leaders including Cardinal Schuster of Milan, Cardinal van Roey in Belgium and Cardinal Verdier in Paris backed the Pope's strong condemnation of Kristallnacht.

Fulda Bishops Conferences

During the war, the Fulda Conference of Bishops met annually in Fulda. The issue of whether the bishops should speak out against the persecution of the Jews was debated at a 1942 meeting. The consensus was to "give up heroic action in favor of small successes". A draft letter proposed by Margarete Sommer was rejected, because it was viewed as a violation of the Reichskonkordat to speak out on issues not directly related to the church. Bishops von Preysing and Frings were the most public in their statements against genocide. Phayer asserts the German episcopate, as opposed to other bishops, could have done more to save Jews. Professor Robert Krieg argues the Church's model of itself "as a hierarchical institution intent on preserving itself so God's grace would be immediately available to its members" prevailed over other models, such as the model of mystical communion, or moral advocate. According to Phayer, "had the German bishops confronted the Holocaust publicly and nationally, the possibilities of undermining Hitler's death apparatus might have existed. Admittedly, it is speculative to assert this, but it is certain that many more German Catholics would have sought to save Jews by hiding them if their church leaders had spoken out". In this regard, Phayer places the responsibility with the Vatican, asserting that "a strong papal assertion would have enabled the bishops to overcome their disinclinations" and that "Bishop Preysing's only hope to spur his colleagues into action lay in Pius XII". Yet, Some German bishops are praised for their wartime actions; according to Phayer, "several bishops did speak out".

Preysing

In 1935, Pius XI appointed Konrad von Preysing as Bishop of Berlin. Preysing assisted in drafting the anti-Nazi encyclical Mit Brennender Sorge. Together with Cologne's Archbishop, Josef Frings, sought to have the German Bishops conference speak out against the Nazi death camps. Preysing even infrequently attended meetings of the Kreisau Circle German resistance movement. Von Preysing was a noted critic of Nazism, but was protected from Nazi retaliation by his position. His cathedral administrator and confidant Bernhard Lichtenberg, was not. Lichtenberg was under the watch of the Gestapo by 1933, for his courageous support of prisoners and Jews. He ran Preysing's aid unit (the Hilfswerke beim Bischöflichen Ordinariat Berlin) which secretly assisted those who were being persecuted by the regime. From 1938, Lichtenberg conducted prayers for the Jews and other inmates of the concentration camps, including "my fellow priests there". For preaching against Nazi propaganda and writing a letter of protest concerning Nazi euthanasia, he was arrested in 1941, sentenced to two years' penal servitude, and died en route to Dachau concentration camp in 1943. He was subsequently honoured by Yad Vashem as Righteous Among the Nations.

Frings

Josef Frings became Archbishop of Cologne in 1942. In his sermons, he repeatedly spoke in support of persecuted peoples and against state repression. In March 1944, Frings attacked arbitrary arrests, racial persecution and forced divorces. That autumn, he protested to the Gestapo against the deportations of Jews from Cologne and surrounds. Following war's end, Frings succeeded Bertram as chairman of the Fulda Bishops' Conference in July 1945. In 1946, he was appointed a cardinal by Pius XII. In 1943, the German bishops debated whether to directly confront Hitler collectively over what they knew of the murdering of Jews. Frings wrote a pastoral letter cautioning his diocese not to violate the inherent rights of others to life, even those "not of our blood"; during the war, he preached in a sermon, "no one may take the property or life of an innocent person just because he is a member of a foreign race".

Kaller

In East Prussia, the Bishop of Ermland, Maximilian Kaller denounced Nazi eugenics and racism, pursued a policy of ethnic equality for his German, Polish and Lithuanian flock, and protected his Polish clergy and laypeople. Threatened by the Nazis, he applied for a transfer to be chaplain to a concentration camp. His request was denied by Cesare Orsenigo, a Papal Nuncio with some Fascist sympathies.

Laity

Among the laity, Gertrud Luckner was among the first to sense the genocidal inclinations of the Hitler regime and to take national action. From 1938 she worked at the head office of Caritas. She organized aid circles for Jews, assisted many to escape. She personally investigated the fate of the Jews being transported to the East and managed to obtain information on prisoners in concentration camps. In 1935, Margarete Sommer took up a position at the Episcopal Diocesan Authority in Berlin, counseling victims of racial persecution for Caritas Emergency Relief. In 1941 she became director of the Welfare Office of the Berlin Diocesan Authority, under Bernhard Lichtenberg. Following Lichtenberg's arrest, Sommer reported to Bishop von Preysing. While working for the Welfare Office, Sommer coordinated Catholic aid for victims of racial persecution—giving spiritual comfort, food, clothing, and money. She gathered intelligence on the deportations of the Jews, and living conditions in concentration camps, as well as on SS firing squads, writing several reports on these topics from 1942; including an August 1942 report which reached Rome under the title "Report on the Exodus of the Jews".

Knowledge of the Holocaust

Unlike the Nazi euthanasia murder of invalids, which the churches led protests against, the Final Solution liquidation of the Jews did not primarily take place on German soil, but rather in Polish territory. Awareness of the murderous campaign was therefore less widespread. Susan Zuccotti has written that the Vatican was aware of the creation of the Nazi extermination camps. She believed an "open condemnation of racism and the persecutions (of Jews)" by the Church, "other results could have been achieved." With regard to work done by the Vatican, "much more was requested by many". Indeed, "much more was hoped for by the Jews.", wrote Zuccotti. According to historians David Bankier and Hans Mommsen a thorough knowledge of the Holocaust was well within the reach of the German bishops. According to historian Michael Phayer, "a number of bishops did want to know, and they succeeded very early on in discovering what their government was doing to the Jews in occupied Poland". Wilhelm Berning, for example, knew about the systematic nature of the Holocaust as early as February 1942, only one month after the Wannsee Conference. Most German Church historians believe that the church leaders knew of the Holocaust by the end of 1942, knowing more than any other church leaders outside the Vatican.

US Envoy Myron C. Taylor passed a US Government memorandum to Pius XII on 26 September 1942, outlining intelligence received from the Jewish Agency for Palestine which said that Jews from across the Nazi Empire were being systematically "butchered". Taylor asked if the Vatican might have any information which might tend to "confirm the reports", and if so, what the Pope might be able to do to influence public opinion against the "barbarities". Cardinal Maglione handed Harold Tittman a response to a letter from Taylor regarding the mistreatment of Jews on 10 October. The note thanked Washington for passing on the intelligence, and confirmed that reports of severe measures against the Jews had reached the Vatican from other sources, though it had not been possible to "verify their accuracy". Nevertheless, "every opportunity is being taken by the Holy See, however, to mitigate the suffering of these unfortunate people". The Pope raised race murders in his 1942 Christmas Radio Address. However, after the war, some bishops, including Adolf Bertram and Conrad Gröber claimed that they had not been aware of the extent and details of the Holocaust, and were unsure of the veracity of the information that was brought to their attention.

== Catholic Church in the Nazi Empire ==
=== Central Europe ===
Austria

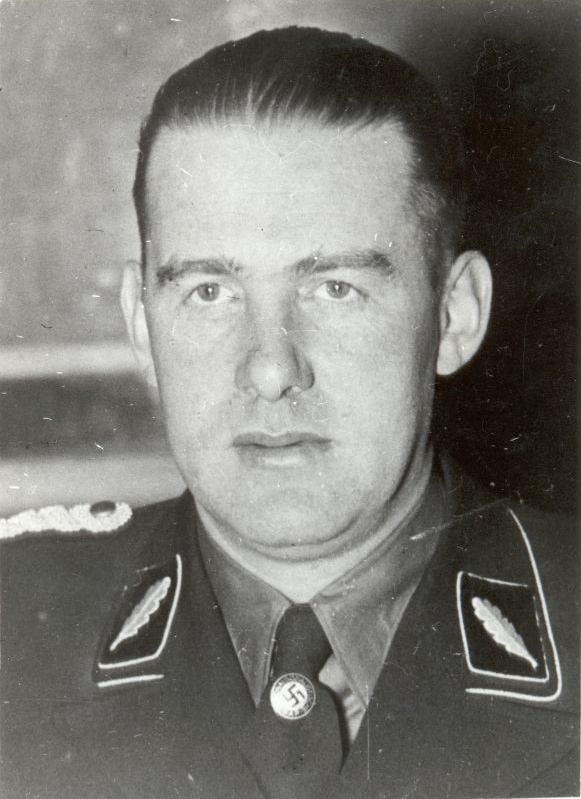
The Nazi Gauleiter of Vienna, Odilo Globočnik. Following the Anschluss, he launched a crusade against the Church, and the Nazis confiscated property, closed Catholic organisations and sent many priests to Dachau.

The Anschluss saw the annexation of mainly Catholic Austria by Nazi Germany in early 1938. Hitler initially attempted to appeal to Christians in a speech on April 9 in Vienna, when he told the Austrian public that it was "God's will" he led his homeland into the Reich and the Lord had "smitten" his opponents. At the direction of Cardinal Innitzer, the churches of Vienna pealed their bells and flew swastikas for Hitler's arrival in the city on 14 March. However, wrote Mark Mazower, such gestures of accommodation were "not enough to assuage the Austrian Nazi radicals, foremost among them the young Gauleiter Globočnik".

Globocnik launched a crusade against the Church, and the Nazis confiscated property, closed Catholic organisations and sent many priests to Dachau, including Jakob Gapp and Otto Neururer. Neururer was tortured and hanged at Buchenwald and Gapp was guillotined in Berlin; both were beatified in 1996. Anger at the treatment of the Church in Austria grew quickly and October 1938, wrote Mazower, saw the "very first act of overt mass resistance to the new regime", when a rally of thousands left Mass in Vienna chanting "Christ is our Fuehrer", before being dispersed by police. A Nazi mob ransacked Cardinal Innitzer's residence, after he had denounced Nazi persecution of the Church. L'Osservatore Romano reported on 15 October that Hitler Youth and the SA had gathered at Innitzer's Cathedral during a service for Catholic Youth and started "counter-shouts and whistlings: 'Down with Innitzer! Our faith is Germany'". The following day, a mob stoned the Cardinal's residence, broke in and ransacked it—bashing a secretary unconscious, and storming another house of the cathedral curia and throwing its curate out the window. The American National Catholic Welfare Conference wrote that Pope Pius, "again protested against the violence of the Nazis, in language recalling Nero and Judas the Betrayer, comparing Hitler with Julian the Apostate." In a Table Talk of July 1942 discussing his problems with the Church, Hitler singles out Innitzer's early gestures of cordiality as evidence of the extreme caution with which Church diplomats must be treated: "there appeared a man who addressed me with such self-assurance and beaming countenance, just as if, throughout the whole of the Austrian Republic he had never even touched a hair of the head of any National Socialist!"

Czech lands

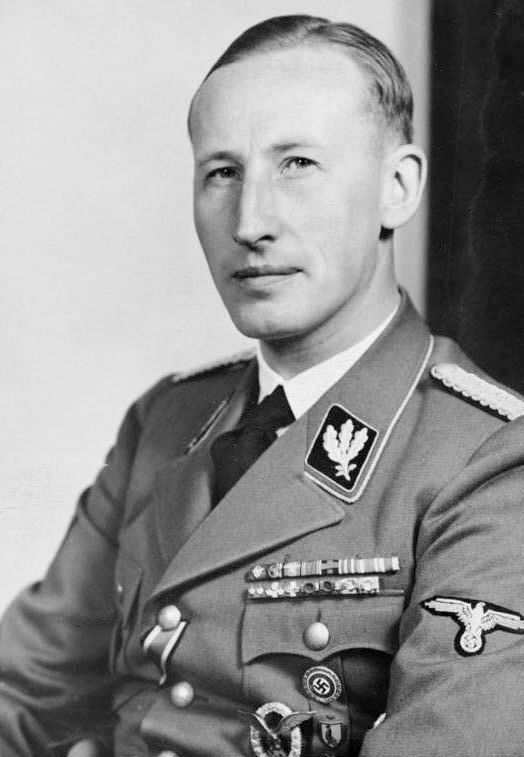
Reinhard Heydrich, the Nazi governor of Bohemia and Moravia (Czech region). One of the main architects of the Nazi Holocaust, he believed that Catholicism was a threat to the state.

Czechoslovakia was created after World War I and the collapse of the Austro-Hungarian Empire. Shortly before World War II, Czechoslovakia ceased to exist, swallowed by Nazi expansion. Its territory was divided into the mainly Czech Protectorate of Bohemia and Moravia, and the newly declared Slovak Republic, while a considerable part of Czechoslovakia was directly joined to the Third Reich (Hungary and Poland also annexed areas). Catholicism had had a strong institutional presence in the region under the Habsburg Dynasty, but Bohemian Czechs in particular had a troubled relationship with the Church of their rulers. Despite this, According to Schnitker, "the Church managed to gain a deep-seated appreciation for the role it played in resisting the common Nazi enemy."

Some 487 Czechoslovak priests were arrested and jailed during the occupation. 122 Czechoslovak Catholic priests were sent to Dachau concentration camp. Seventy-six did not survive the ordeal. Following its October 1938 annexation, Nazi policy in the Sudetenland saw ethnic Czech priests expelled, or deprived of income and forced to do labour, while their properties were seized. Religious orders were suppressed, private schools closed and religious instruction forbidden in schools.

When the Germans advanced on Prague in March 1939, churches came under gestapo surveillance and hundreds of priests were denounced. Monasteries and convents were requisitioned and Corpus Christi processions curtailed. As elsewhere, the Catholic press was muzzled. Following the outbreak of war, 487 priests were rounded up from occupied Czechoslovakia—among them the Canon of Vysehrad, Msgr. Bohumil Stašek. On 13 August 1939, Stašek had given a patriotic address to a 100,000 strong crowd of Czechoslovaks, criticising the Nazis: "I believed that truth would triumph over falsehood, law over lawlessness, love and compassion over violence". For his resistance efforts, Bohumil spent the remainder of the war in prison and the concentration camps. Msgr. Tenora, Dean of the Brno Cathedral was also among those arrested, while six directors of Catholic charities were also seized including Mgr Otto Lev Stanovsky. Karel Kašpar, the Archbishop of Prague and Primate of Bohemia was arrested soon after the occupation of his city, after he refused to obey an order to direct priests to discontinue pilgrimages. Kaspar was repeatedly arrested by the Nazi authorities and died in 1941. In announcing the Archbishop's death on radio, Josef Beran, the director of the Prague diocese main seminary, called on Czechs to remain true to their religion and to their country. Konstantin von Neurath served as Reich Protector (Governor) from March 1939 until he was replaced by Reich Security Central Office chief Reinhard Heydrich. Heydrich was a fanatical Nazi anti-Semite and anti-Catholic. One of the main architects of the Nazi Holocaust, he believed that Catholicism was a threat to the state. He was assassinated by Czech commandos in Prague in 1942. Hitler was angered by the co-operation between the church and the assassins who killed Heydrich. Following the assassination of Heydrich, Josef Beran was among the thousands arrested, for his patriotic stance. Beran was sent to Dachau, where he remained until Liberation, whereafter he was appointed Archbishop of Prague—which had remained vacant since the death of Kašpar.

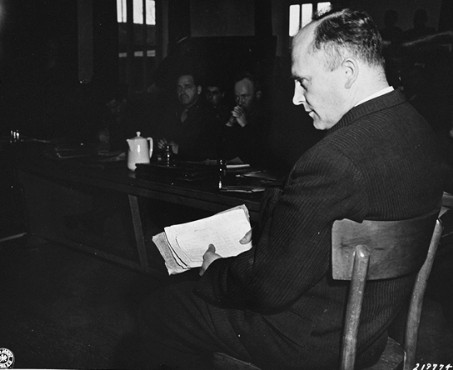
Friedrich Hoffman, a Czech priest, testifies at the trial of camp personnel from Dachau, where over a thousand clergy died. 122 Czechoslovak priests were imprisoned there, but Poles constituted the largest proportion of those imprisoned in the dedicated Clergy Barracks.

Slovakia

Slovakia was a rump state formed by Hitler when Germany annexed the western half of Czechoslovakia. Hitler was able to exploit Czechoslovakia's ethnic rivalries—particularly presence of the German-speaking Sudetenlanders, and the independent minded Slovaks. The Slovak People's Party (SPP) had been founded in 1913 by a Catholic priest, Andrej Hlinka, and wanted Slovak autonomy. The extreme-nationalist lawyer Vojtech Tuka headed the party's radical wing, which moved steadily closer to Nazism, complete with Hlinka Guard paramilitary. In March 1939, Prague arrested Hlinka's successor, Fr. Jozef Tiso, the Prime Minister of the Slovak region, for advocating independence. Hitler invited Tiso to Berlin, and offered assistance for Slovak nationhood. Tiso declared independence, and with German warships pointing their guns at the Slovak Government offices, the Assembly agreed to ask Germany for "protection". The small and predominantly Catholic and agricultural region became the Fascist Slovak Republic, a nominally independent Nazi puppet state, with Tiso as president and Tuka as Minister-President. Tiso's role was largely ceremonial, while Tuka was the instrument of Nazi policy in the state.

On 28 July 1940, Hitler instructed Tiso and Tuka to impose antisemitic laws. SS Officer Dieter Wisliceny was dispatched to act as an adviser on Jewish issues. According to Phayer, "Hitler demanded a price for Slovak independence, its 90,000 Jews. Pius XII wanted to save them, or at least the 20,000 who had converted to Christianity". Giuseppe Burzio, the Apostolic Delegate to Bratislava, protested the antisemitism and totalitarianism of the regime. Pius XII extended an apostolic blessing to Tiso. The Vatican was pleased to see a new Catholic state, but disapproved of the Codex Judaicum of September 1941 (based on the Nuremberg Laws) by which the legal rights of Jews were ended. The Holy See reacted with a letter of protest. The Slovak bishops told Tiso that, through persecution of people on the basis of their race, he acted against the principles of religion and the Vatican demoted Tiso. According to Phayer, the Vatican's main concern was for the rights of Jewish converts.

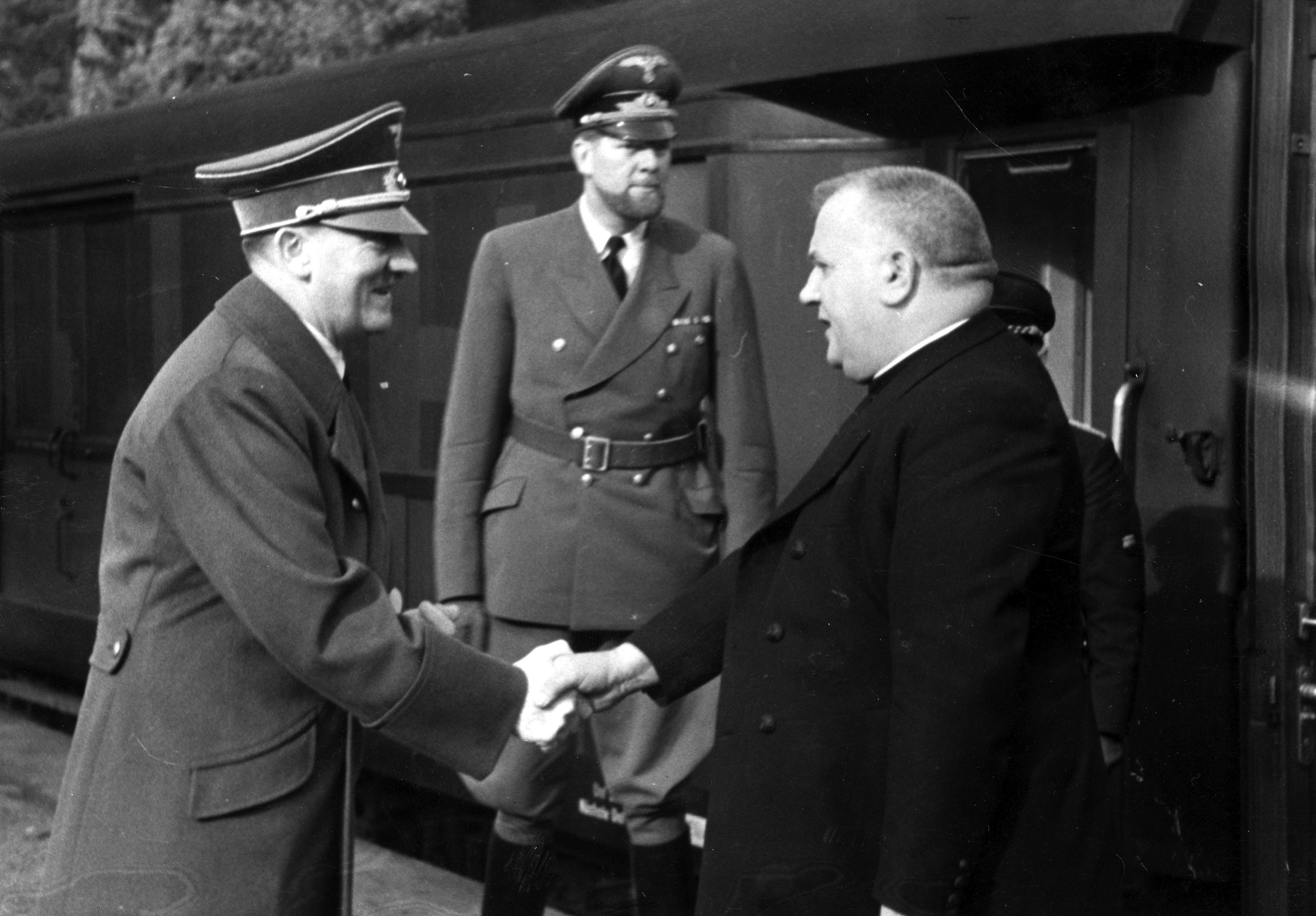
Monsignor Jozef Tiso the priest-president of the Nazi puppet state of Slovakia, meeting Hitler.

Slovakia, under Tiso and Tuka (who described himself as a daily communicant), had power over 90,000 Jews. Like the Nazis other main allies, Petain, Mussolini, and Horthy—Tiso did not share the racist hardline on Jews held by Hitler and radicals within his own government, but held a more traditional, conservative antisemitism. His regime was nonetheless highly antisemitic.

Phayer wrote that antisemitism existed well before the Nazi time and during the interwar period "antisemitism characterised the Catholicism of the Slovak people". The People's Party, founded and dominated by clergymen, used antisemitism as part of its political presentation. Antisemitic terror was practised by the Hlinka Guard. Tiso promulgated the first antisemitic legislation in 1939 and 1940. In February 1942, Tiso agreed to begin deportations of Jews and Slovakia became the first Nazi ally to agree to deportations under the framework of the Final Solution. The Nazis had asked for 20,000 young able-bodied Jews. Tiso hoped that compliance would aid in the return of 120,000 Slovak workers from Germany. Burzio protested to Prime Minister Vojtech Tuka. Later in 1942, amid Vatican protests as news of the fate of the deportees filtered back, and the German advance into Russia was halted, Slovakia became the first of Hitler's puppet states to shut down the deportations.

The Vatican began to receive reports from Slovak army chaplains in October 1941 of mass shootings of Jews on the Eastern Front, but did not take action. When, in early 1942, papal diplomats in Bratislava, Hungary and Switzerland predicted impending deportations and exterminations, the Vatican protested. Burzio advised Rome of deportations to Poland "equivalent to condemning a great part of them to death" and the Vatican protested to the Slovak legate. According to Phayer, the protests, not made in public, were ineffectual and 'resettlements' continued in the summer and autumn of 1942—57,752 by the end of 1942. Burzio reported to Rome that some of the Slovak bishops were indifferent to the plight of the Jews. Others, such as Bishop Pavol Jantausch and Bishop Pavol Gojdič were active in protecting Jews. The Vicar of Bratislava Augustin Pozdech and Jozef Čársky, Bishop of Prešov, emphatically denounced the deportations. Knowledge of the conditions at Auschwitz began to spread. Mazower wrote: "When the Vatican protested, the government responded with defiance: 'There is no foreign intervention which would stop us on the road to the liberation of Slovakia from Jewry', insisted President Tiso". Distressing scenes at railway yards of deportees being beaten by Hlinka guards had spurred community protest, including from leading churchmen such as Bishop Pavol Jantausch.

The Vatican called in the Slovak ambassador twice to enquire what was happening. These interventions, wrote Evans, "caused Tiso, who after all was still a priest in holy orders, to have second thoughts about the programme". Burzio and others reported to Tiso that the Germans were murdering the deported Jews. Tiso hesitated and then refused to deport Slovakia's 24,000 remaining Jews. According to Mazower "Church pressure and public anger resulted in perhaps 20,000 Jews being granted exemptions, effectively bringing the deportations there to an end". According to Phayer, Raul Hilberg wrote that "Catholic Slovakia, wanting to serve its two masters, Berlin and Rome, gave up its Mosaic Jews—a journey by train to Auschwitz required one hour—to please Hitler, while holding back its 20,000 Christian Jews to please the Holy See". When in 1943 rumours of further deportations emerged, the Papal Nuncio in Istanbul, Msgr. Angelo Roncalli (later Pope John XXIII) and Burzio helped galvanize the Holy See into intervening in vigorous terms. On April 7, 1943, Burzio challenged Tuka, over the extermination of Slovak Jews. The Vatican condemned the renewal of the deportations on 5 May and the Slovak episcopate issued a pastoral letter condemning totalitarianism and antisemitism on 8 May 1943. "Tuka", wrote Evans, was "forced to backtrack by public protests, especially from the Church, which by this time had been convinced of the fate that awaited the deportees. Pressure from the Germans, including a direct confrontation between Hitler and Tiso on 22 April 1943, remained without effect." In August 1944, the Slovak National Uprising rose against the People's Party regime. German troops were sent to quell the rebellion and with them came security police charged with rounding up Slovakia's remaining Jews. Burzio begged Tiso directly to at least spare Catholic Jews from transportation and delivered an admonition from the Pope: "the injustice wrought by his government is harmful to the prestige of his country and enemies will exploit it to discredit clergy and the Church the world over." Tiso ordered the deportation of the nation's remaining Jews, who were sent to the concentration camps—most to Auschwitz.

=== Eastern Europe ===
Poland

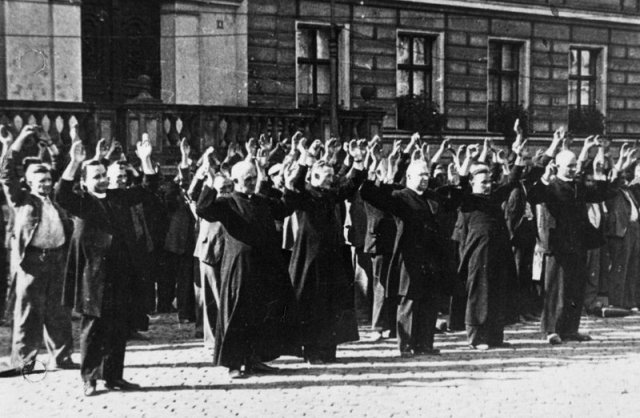
Public execution of Polish priests and civilians in Bydgoszcz's Old Market Square, 9 September 1939. The Polish Church suffered a brutal persecution under Nazi Occupation.

Ian Kershaw wrote that Hitler's scheme for the Germanization of Eastern Europe, "There would, he made clear, be no place in this utopia for the Christian Churches". The invasion of predominantly Catholic Poland by Nazi Germany in 1939 ignited the Second World War. The Nazi plan for Poland entailed the destruction of the Polish nation, which necessarily required attacking the Polish Church, particularly, in those areas annexed to Germany.

In Nazi ideological terms, Poland was inhabited by a mixture of Slavs and Jews, both of which were classed as Untermenschen, or subhumans occupying German Lebensraum, living space. Germany instigated a policy of genocide against Poland's Jewish minority and murdering or suppressing the ethnic Polish elites. Historically, the church was a leading force in Polish nationalism against foreign domination and the Nazis targeted clergy, monks and nuns in their terror campaigns for their resistance activity and their cultural importance. According to the Encyclopædia Britannica, 1,811 Polish priests were murdered in Nazi concentration camps. Special death squads of SS and police accompanied the invasion and arrested or executed those considered capable of resisting the occupation: including professionals, clergymen and government officials. The following summer, the A-B Aktion round up of several thousand Polish intelligentsia by the SS saw many priests shot in the General Government sector. In September 1939 Security Police Chief Heydrich and General Eduard Wagner agreed upon a "cleanup once and for all of Jews, intelligentsia, clergy, nobility". Of the brief period of military control from 1 September 1939 to 25 October 1939, Davies wrote: "according to one source, 714 mass executions were carried out, and 6,376 people, mainly Catholics, were shot. Others put the death toll in one town alone at 20,000. It was a taste of things to come."

Poland was divided into two parts by the German occupiers: the Reich directly annexed Polish territories along Germany's eastern border, and the second part came under the administration of the so-called Generalgouvernement (General Government)—a "police run mini-state" under SS control and the rule of Nazi lawyer Hans Frank, which, wrote Davies, "became the lawless laboratory of Nazi racial ideology" and in due course the base for the main Nazi concentration camps. Yet here, Nazi policy toward the Church was less severe than in the annexed regions. The annexed areas were all to be "Germanized", and the Polish Church within them was to be thoroughly eradicated—though German Catholics could remain or settle there. In the annexed regions, the Nazis set about systematically dismantling the Church by arresting its leaders; exiling its clergymen; and closing its churches, monasteries and convents. Many clergymen were murdered. 80% of the Catholic clergy and 5 bishops of Warthegau were sent to concentration camps in 1939; 108 of them are regarded as blessed martyrs. In a report to Pius XII regarding the dire situation, the Primate of Poland, Cardinal August Hlond wrote, "Hitlerism aims at the systematic and total destruction of the Catholic Church in the ... territories of Poland which have been incorporated into the Reich".

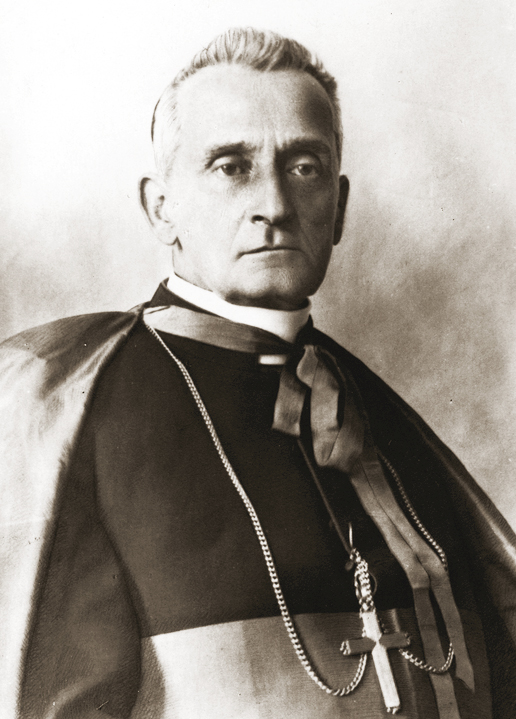
Bishop Sapieha, 1942.

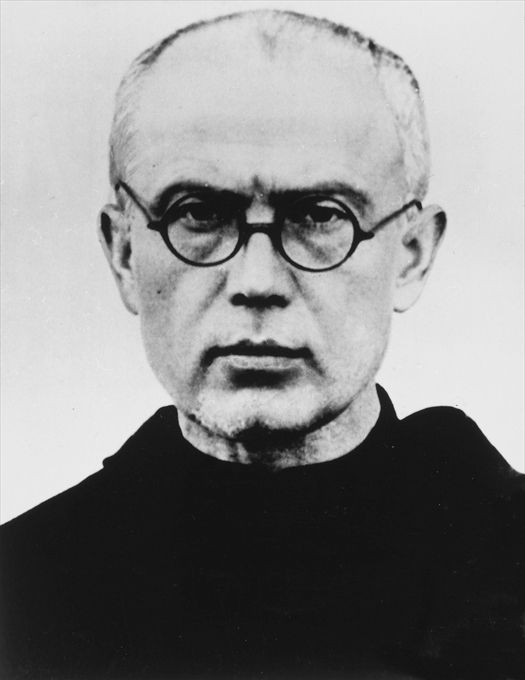
The Polish Franciscan St Maximilian Kolbe was murdered at Auschwitz.

Following the surrender of Warsaw and Hel Fortified Area, the Polish Underground and the Armia Krajowa (Home Army) resisted the German occupation. The Home Army was conscious of the link between morale and religious practice and the Catholic religion was integral to much of the Polish Resistance, particularly during the Warsaw Uprising of 1944. Adam Sapieha, Archbishop of Kraków became the de facto head of the Polish Church after the invasion and openly criticised Nazi terror. A principal figure of the Polish resistance, Sapieha opened a clandestine seminary in an act of cultural resistance. Among the seminarians was Karol Wojtyla, the future Pope John Paul II. Among the most revered Polish martyrs was the Franciscan, Saint Maximilian Kolbe, who was murdered at Auschwitz-Birkenau after he offered his own life to save a fellow prisoner who had been condemned to death. During the War he provided shelter to refugees, including 2,000 Jews whom he hid in his friary in Niepokalanów. Poland had a large Jewish population and, according to Davies, more Jews were both killed and rescued in Poland, than in any other nation: the rescue figure put at between 100,000 and 150,000, the work of the Catholic-affiliated Council to Aid Jews was instrumental in much rescue work. Thousands of Poles have been honoured as Righteous Among the Gentiles, constituting the largest national contingent, and hundreds of clergymen and nuns were involved in aiding Jews during the war, though precise numbers are difficult to confirm.

When Home Army intelligence discovered the true fate of transports leaving the Jewish ghetto, the Council to Aid Jews (Rada Pomocy Żydom (codenamed Żegota) was established in late 1942 in co-operation with church groups. Instigated by the writer Zofia Kossak-Szczucka and Catholic democrat activists, the organisation saved thousands. Emphasis was placed on protecting children, as it was nearly impossible to intervene directly against the heavily-guarded transports. False papers were prepared, and children were distributed among safe houses and church networks. Jewish children were often placed in church orphanages and convents. Karol Niemira, the Bishop of Pinsk, co-operated with the underground in maintaining ties with the Jewish ghetto and sheltered Jews in the Archbishop's residence. Matylda Getter, mother superior of the Franciscan Sisters of the Family of Mary, hid many children in her Pludy convent and took in many orphans and dispersed them among Family of Mary homes, rescuing more than 750 Jews. Oskar Schindler, a German Catholic businessman came to Poland, initially to profit from the German invasion. He went on to save many Jews, as dramatised in the film Schindler's List. Under the Papacy of the Polish-born Pope John Paul II, the Polish Church asked for forgiveness for failings during the war, saying that, while noble efforts had been made to save Jews during World War II, there had also been indifference or enmity among Polish Catholics.

According to Davies, the Nazi terror was "much fiercer and more protracted in Poland than anywhere in Europe". Phayer wrote of two phases of Nazi policy in Poland: before the Battle of Stalingrad, when Poles were suppressed, and after the battles of Stalingrad and Kursk, when Germany sought to use the church to bring the Polish people into the war effort against the Soviets. When Cardinal Hlond was captured in 1943 the Germans promised to free him if he would seek to inspire the Polish people against the common enemy, the Soviets. Hlond refused to negotiate with his captors unless all of Poland was freed. He was the only member of the Sacred College of Cardinals to be arrested by the Nazis, and was held by the Gestapo, first at its headquarters in Paris and then confined at a convent at Bar-le-Duc, until the Allied advance forced the Germans to shift him to Wiedenbrtick, in Westphalia, where he remained for seven months until he was released by American troops in 1945.

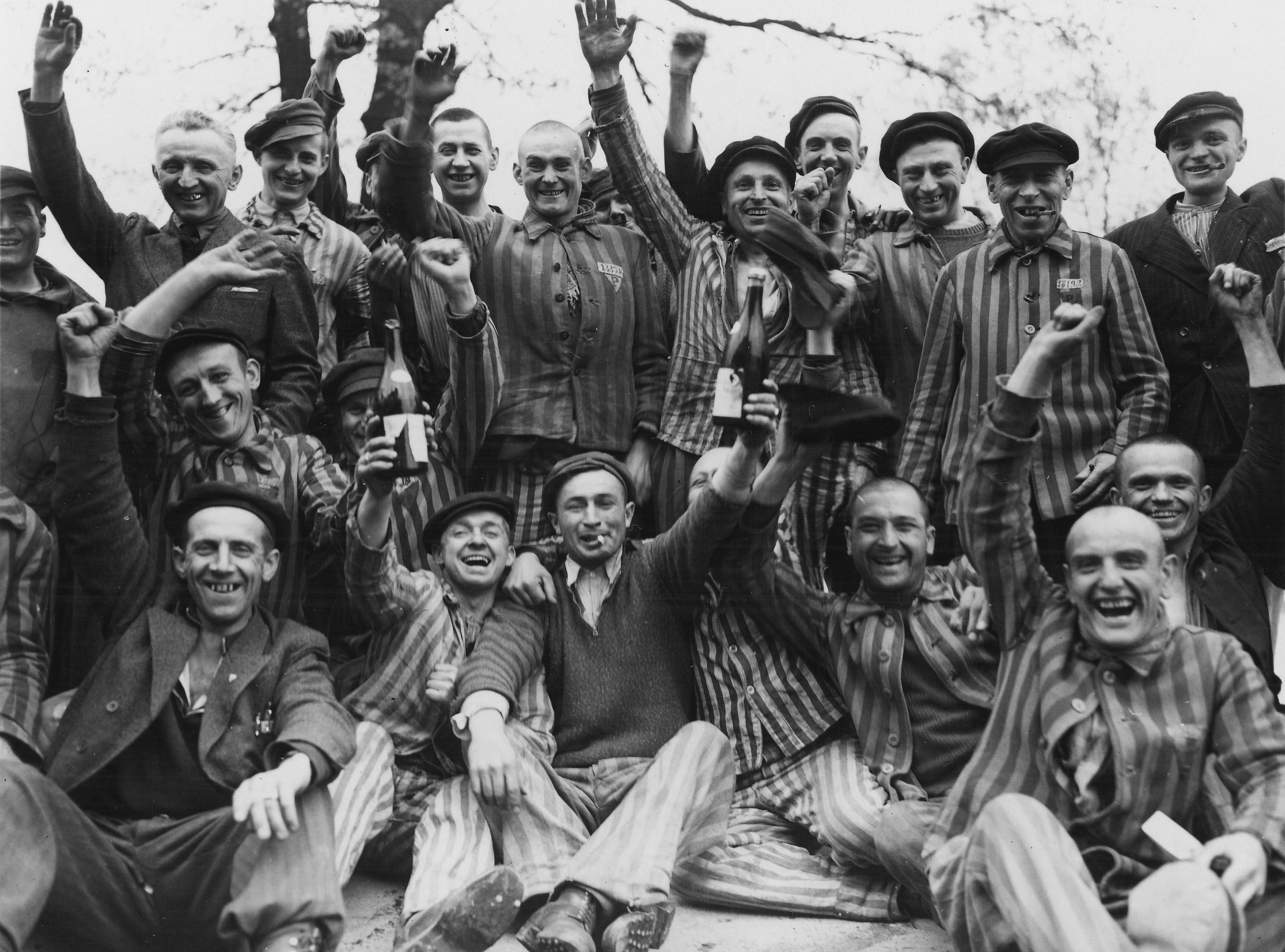
Polish prisoners toast their liberation from Dachau concentration camp. Among the estimated 3,000 members (18%) of the Polish clergy who were killed by the Germans; of these, 1,992 died in concentration camps.

In response to the German and Soviet invasion, Pope Pius XII's first encyclical, Summi Pontificatus, wrote of an "hour of darkness" and the deaths of "countless human beings, even noncombatants". "Dear Poland" deserved "the generous and brotherly sympathy of the whole world, while it awaits ... the hour of a resurrection in harmony with the principles of justice and true peace". In April 1940, the Holy See advised the Anerucab government that all its efforts to deliver humanitarian aid had been blocked by the Germans and that it was therefore seeking to channel assistance through indirect routes like the Commission for Polish Relief. In 1942, the American National Catholic Welfare Conference reported that "as Cardinal Hlond's reports poured into the Vatican, Pope Pius XII protested against the enormities they recounted with unrelenting vigor". It noted the Pope's 28 October Encyclical and reported that Pius addressed Polish clergy on 30 September 1939 and spoke of "a vision of mad horror and gloomy despair" and said that he hoped that despite the work of the enemies of God, Catholic life would survive in Poland. In a Christmas Eve address to the College of Cardinals, Pius condemned the atrocities "even against non-combatants, refugees, old persons, women and children, and the disregard of human dignity, liberty and human life" that had taken place in the Polish war as "acts that cry for the vengeance of God".

According to Phayer, from 1939 to 1941, there was a determined appeal for papal intercession in Poland, but the Holy See argued that intervention would only worsen the situation though that was not a popular position. When the French urged Pius to condemn Germany's aggression, he declined "out of consideration for repercussions on Roman Catholics of the Reich"é August Hlond and the General of the Jesuits Wlodimir Ledóchowski met with Pius on September 30, 1940 and left disappointed when he did not condemn the Soviet Union or Germany for destroying Poland. The Vatican used its press and radio to tell the world in January 1940 of terrorization of the Polish people, a reference to Poles of Warthegau and of the Polish Corridor who had been dispossessed and driven into the General Government. A further broadcast in November lacked the detail of January communications and "Thereafter", wrote Phayer, "Vatican radio fell silent regarding Poland and the decimation of its populace". On 16 and 17 November 1940, Vatican Radio said that religious life for Catholics in Poland continued to be brutally restricted and that at least 400 clergy had been deported to Germany in the past four months:

The Catholic Associations in the General Government also have been dissolved, the Catholic educational institutions have been closed down, and Catholic professors and teachers have been reduced to a state of extreme need or have been sent to concentration camps. The Catholic press has been rendered impotent. In the part incorporated into the Reich, and especially in Posnania, the representatives of the Catholic priests and orders have been shut up in concentration camps. In other dioceses the priests have been put in prison. Entire areas of the country have been deprived of all spiritual ministrations and the church seminaries have been dispersed.

— Vatican Radio, November 1940

In November 1941, Bishop Sapieha requested explicitly for Pius to speak out against Nazi atrocities. According to Lucas, the pope's "silence" led some Polish Catholics to conclude that the Vatican was unconcerned, and there was even talk of cutting off allegiance to Rome. Pius alluded vaguely to atrocities on Easter 1941, and Cardinal Secretary of State Luigi Maglione explained to the Polish Ambassador to the Holy See that Pius spoke in veiled words but had Poland in mind. The policy was intended to spare Poles from greater atrocities. Word came later from Poland objecting to that but would be used again, during the Holocaust itself.

Catholic religious fervour was a feature of the 1944 Warsaw Uprising. General Antoni Chruściel issued instructions on how frontline troops could continue to continue religious observance. Clergy were involved on many levels: as chaplains to military units, or tending to the ever-increasing wounded and dying. "Nuns of various orders", wrote Davies, "acted as universal sisters of mercy and won widespread praise. Mortality among them higher than among most categories of civilians. When captured by the SS, they aroused a special fury, which frequently ended in rape or butchery". According to Davies, the Catholic religion was an integral component of the struggle.

Hungary

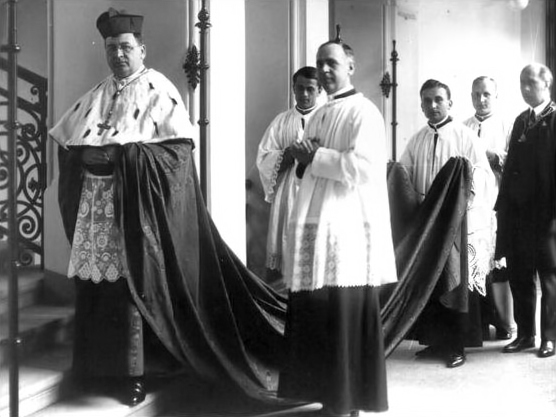
Cardinal Jusztinián György Serédi. As a member of the Hungarian Parliament, he voted in favour of antisemitic legislation in 1938. Later, he spoke against Nazi mistreatment of the Jews.

Hungary joined the Axis powers in 1940. Its leader, Admiral Miklós Horthy, later wavered in support for the alliance. Germany occupied Hungary in March 1944, soon after Horthy, under significant pressure from the church and the diplomatic community, had halted the deportations of Hungarian Jews. In October, it installed a pro-German Arrow Cross dictatorship.

After Germany's 1935 Nuremberg Laws were promulgated, similar legislation had followed in much of the rest if Europe. Catholic priests and bishops in Western Europe were not active in parliaments that established anti-Semitic legislation, unlike in Eastern Europe. The Arrow Cross, Hungary's far-right anti-Semitic political organisation, was supported by individual priests, and bishops, such as József Grősz, who was promoted in 1943 by Pius XII to the bishopric of Kalocsa. Cardinal Jusztinián György Serédi and Bishop Gyula Glattfelder, who served in Hungary's House of Magnates, the upper chamber of the Hungarian Parliament, voted in favour of anti-Semitic legislation, which was first passed in 1938. Serédi later spoke out against the Nazi persecution of Hungary's Jews. The antisemitic laws placed economic and social restrictions on Jews; during World War II they evolved into initiatives to expel Jews from Hungary. Margit Slachta, a nun and the first female member of the Hungarian Parliament, spoke against the antis—Semitic laws. After the October 1944 Arrow Cross takeover, Bishop Vilmos Apor, who had been an active protester against the mistreatment of the Jews, together with other senior clergy including József Mindszenty, drafted a memorandum of protest against the Arrow Cross government.

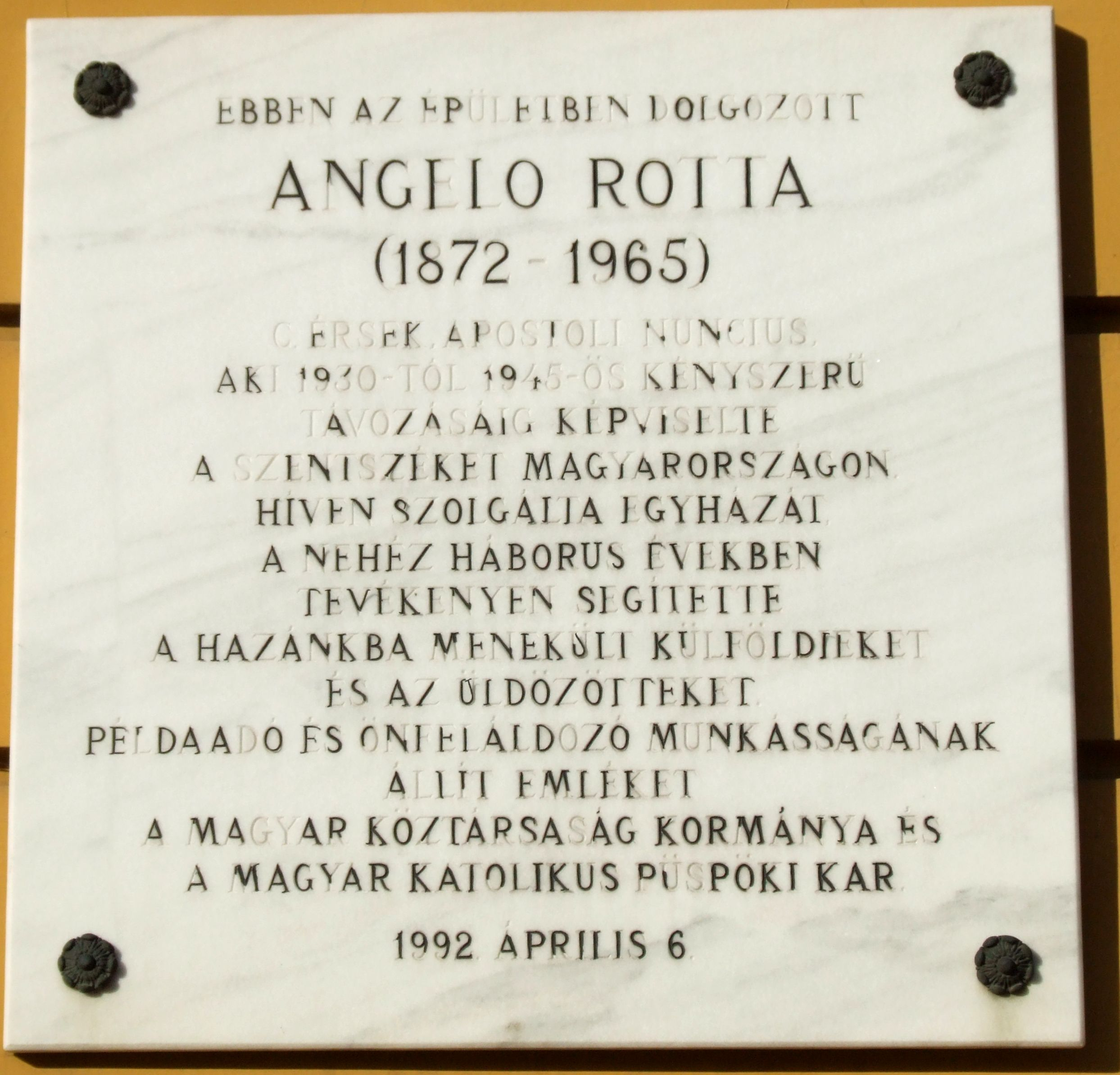
Memorial plaque to Papal Nuncio Angelo Rotta. Honoured as a Righteous Gentile, he was active in saving Hungarian Jews.

Margit Slachta sheltered the persecuted, protested forced labour and antisemitism and went to Rome in 1943 to encourage papal action against the persecutions. Angelo Rotta, Papal Nuncio from 1930, actively protested Hungary's mistreatment of the Jews, and helped persuade Pope Pius XII to lobby the Hungarian leader Admiral Horthy to stop their deportation. Rotta became a leader of diplomatic actions to protect Hungarian Jews. With the help of the Hungarian Holy Cross Association, he issued protective passports for Jews and 15,000 safe conduct passes, and the nunciature sheltered some 3000 Jews in safe houses. An "International Ghetto" was established, including more than 40 safe houses marked by the Vatican and other national emblems. 25,000 Jews found refuge in these safe houses. Elsewhere in the city, Catholic institutions hid several thousand more Jewish people. Other leading church figures involved in the 1944 rescue of Hungarian Jews included Bishops Vilmos Apor, Endre Hamvas and Áron Márton. Primate József Mindszenty issued public and private protests and was arrested on 27 October 1944.

By late summer 1944, Pius XII was asked to speak directly to the Hungarian people, ideally through Vatican Radio, now that the diplomatic avenues were exhausted. A direct public appeal was felt, especially in American circles, could have some effect. Pius XII would not do so, however, arguing that a public radio appeal and condemnation of Nazi actions would necessitate a papal criticism of Soviet behaviour as well. There was apparently still some scepticism still in Vatican circles about the severity of the situation. In September 1944, Amleto Cicognani, papal representative in Washington, told Aryeh Leon Kubowitzki (later Aryeh Leon Kubovy) of the World Jewish Congress that "the situation in Hungary is much less acute, since the persons responsible for the previous persecution have been removed from power". "Contradictory information", it was claimed, was arriving about the Hungarian situation. Ultimately, when called upon to condemn publicly Nazi policies against Jews publicly, Pius XII chose to exercise restraint in the name of avoiding a greater evil.

Romania

Angelo Roncalli (later Pope John XXIII) advised Pope Pius XII of the plight of Jews being kept in concentration camps in Romanian-occupied Transnistria. The Pope interceded with the Romanian government and authorised for money to be sent to the camps. Andrea Cassulo, the papal nuncio to Bucharest, was honoured as Righteous among the Nations by Yad Vashem. In 1944, the Chief Rabbi of Bucharest praised the work of Cassulo on behalf of Romania's Jews: "the generous assistance of the Holy See ... was decisive and salutary. It is not easy for us to find the right words to express the warmth and consolation we experienced because of the concern of the supreme Pontiff, who offered a large sum to relieve the sufferings of deported Jews—sufferings which had been pointed out to him by you after your visit to Transnistria. The Jews of Romania will never forget these facts of historic importance."

=== Southern Europe ===
Croatia

After World War I, the desire of Croatian nationalists for independence was not realised. The region found itself in a Serb dominated dictatorship of Yugoslavia. Repression of the Croat minority spurred extremism, and the Ustaša ("Insurgence") was formed in 1929 by Ante Pavelić, with the support of Fascist Italy. Germany, Italy, Bulgaria and Hungary dismembered Yugoslavia in April 1941. In regions controlled by Italy, the Italian authorities protected Jews from Nazi roundups, as occurred throughout Italian territory. Martin Gilbert wrote that when negotiations began for the deportation of Jews from the Italian zone, General Roatta flatly refused, leading Hitler's envoy, Siegfried Kasche, to report some of Mussolini's subordinates "apparently been influenced" by opposition in the Vatican to German anti-Semitism. Most of Croatia fell to the new Independent State of Croatia, where Pavelic's Ustase were installed in power. Unlike Hitler, Pavelic was pro-Catholic, but their ideologies overlapped sufficiently for easy co-operation. Phayer wrote, Pavelic wanted Vatican recognition for his fascist state and Croatian church leaders favoured an alliance with the Ustase because it seemed to hold out the promise of an anti-Communist, Catholic state. According to Hebblethwaite, Pavelic was anxious to get diplomatic relations and a Vatican blessing for the new 'Catholic state' but "Neither was forthcoming": Giovanni Montini (future Pope Paul VI) advised Pavelic the Holy See could not recognise frontiers changed by force. The Yugoslav royal legation remained at the Vatican. When the Italian King advised that Duke of Spoleto was to be "King of Croatia", Montini advised the Pope could not hold a private audience with the Duke once any such coronation occurred. Pius subsequently relented, allowing a half hour audience with Pavelic. The Archbishop of Zagreb, Aloysius Stepinac, wanted Croatia's independence from the Serb dominated Yugoslav state (the jail of the Croatian nation). Stepinac arranged the audience with Pius XII for Pavelic. Montini's minutes of the meeting noted no recognition of the new state could come before a peace treaty. "The Holy See must be impartial; it must think of all; there are Catholics on all sides to whom the [Holy See] must be respectful." Phayer wrote that Montini kept Pius informed of matters in Croatia and Domenico Tardini interviewed Pavelic's representative to Pius; he let the Croat know the Vatican would be indulgent—"Croatia is a young state—Youngsters often err because of their age. It is, therefore, not surprising Croatia has also erred." The Vatican refused formal recognition but Pius sent a Benedictine abbot, Giuseppe Ramiro Marcone, as his apostolic visitor. Phayer wrote that this suited Pavelic well enough. Stepinac felt the Vatican de facto recognised the new state. Gilbert wrote, "In the Croatian capital of Zagreb, as a result of intervention by [Marcone] on behalf of Jewish partners in mixed marriages, a thousand Croat Jews survived the war". While "Stepinac, who in 1941 welcomed Croat independence, subsequently condemned Croat atrocities against both Serbs and Jews, and saved a group of Jews in an old age home".

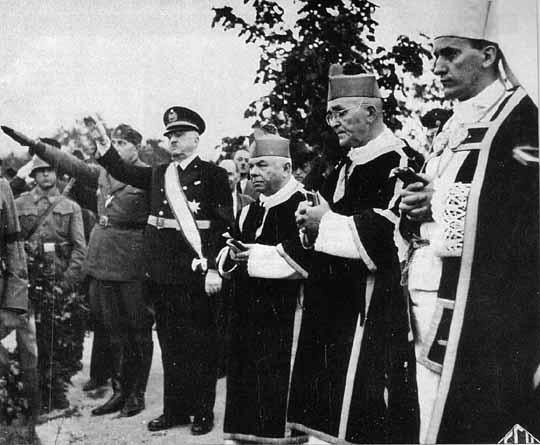
Archbishop Aloysius Stepinac (far right). Initially Stepinac welcomed Croat independence and the Pavelic regime's atrocities against Jews and Serbs

In April–May 1941, hundred of thousands of Serbs were murdered and Nazi copycat laws eliminated Jewish citizenship and compelled the wearing of the Star of David. The German army pulled out of Croatia in June 1941. As the terror continued Archbishop Stepinac had begun, May 1941, to distance himself from the Ustase. Hebblethwaite wrote, "The Vatican's policy was to strengthen the hand of [Stepinac] in his rejection of forcible conversions and brutalities". Pavelic told Nazi Foreign Minister Ribbentrop while the lower clergy supported the Ustase, the bishops, and particularly Stepinac, were opposed to the movement because of "Vatican international policy". In July, Stepniac wrote to Pavelic objecting to the condition of deportation of Jews and Serbs. Then, realizing that conversion could save Serbs, he instructed clergy to baptise people upon demand without the usual waiting and instruction. Summer and autumn of 1941 Ustasha murders increased, but Stepinac was not yet prepared to break with the Ustase regime entirely. Some bishops and priests collaborated openly with Pavelic; even served in Pavelic's body guard. Ivan Guberina, the leader of Catholic Action, among them. Notorious examples of collaboration included Archbishop Ivan Šarić and the Franciscan Miroslav Filipović-Majstorovic, 'the devil of the Jasenovac'. For three months, Filipović-Majstorovic headed the notorious Jasenovac concentration camp. He was suspended as an army chaplain in 1942, expelled from the Franciscan Order in 1943, and executed as a war criminal after the war. He was not, evidently, excommunicated.

Phayer wrote that Archbishop Stepinac himself came to be known as jeudenfreundlich (Jew friendly) to the German and Croat regimes. And, suspended a number of priest collaboratos in his diocese. In the spring of 1942, Stepinac, following a meeting with Pius XII in Rome, declared publicly it was "forbidden to exterminate Gypsies and Jews because they are said to belong to an inferior race". When Himmler visited Zagreb a year later, indicating the impending roundup of remaining Jews, Stepinac wrote to Pavelic that if this occurred, he would protest for "the Catholic Church is not afraid of any secular power, whatever it may be, when it has to protect basic human values". When deportatation began, Stepinac and Marcone protested to Andrija Artuković. The Vatican ordered Stepinac to save as many Jews as possible during the upcoming roundup. In July and October 1943, Stepinac condemned race murders in the most explicit terms. And, his condemnation was read from pulpits across Croatia. The Germans took this to be a denunciation of the murder of both Serbs and Jews, and arrested 31 priests. Phayer wrote that despite knowing he would be a target of Communists if the Croat regime fell, "no leader of a national church ever spoke as pointedly about genocide as did Stepinac". Though Stepinac personally saved many potential victims, his protests had little effect on Pavelic. The Apostolic delegate to Turkey, Angelo Roncalli, saved a number of Croatian Jews—as well as Bulgarian and Hungarian Jews— assisting their migration to Palestine. Roncalli succeeded Pius XII as Pope, always said he was acting on the orders of Pius XII in his actions to rescue Jews. In 1943 after the German military became active once again in Croatia, six to seven thousand Jews were deported to Auschwitz, others murdered in gas vans in Croatia. Rather than jeopardize the Ustase government by diplomatic wrangling, the Vatican chose to help Jews privately. But, the chaos of the country meant this was little. Historian John Morley called the Vatican record particularly shameful in Croatia because it was a state which proudly proclaimed its Catholic tradition. Whose leaders depicted themselves as loyal to the Church and the Pope. Diplomatic pressure was preferred to public challenges on the immorality of genocide. Pavelic's diplomatic emissaries to the Holy See were merely scolded by Tardini and Montini. At the war's end, leaders of the Ustasha, including its clericals supporters such as, Saric, fled taking gold looted from massacred Jews and Serbs with them.

Slovenia

The Nazi persecution of the Church in annexed Slovenia was akin to that which occurred in Poland. Within six weeks of the German occupation, only 100 of the 831 priests in the Diocese of Maribor and part of the Diocese of Ljubljana remained free. Clergy were persecuted and sent to concentration camps, religious Orders had their properties seized, some youth were sterilized. The first priest to die was Aloysius Zuzek.

Following the German invasion of the Kingdom of Yugoslavia in April 1941, Slovenia was partitioned, between Italy, Hungary and Germany, which annexed the north. In the Carinthian and Styrian regions, the mainly Austrian rulers commenced a brutal campaign to destroy the Slovene nation. The Jesuit John Le Farge reported in the Catholic press in the America that the situation an official report sent to the Vatican following the invasion "may be briefly described as hell for Catholics and Catholicism in Slovenia, a 98% Catholic country, a hell deliberately planned by Adolf Hitler out of his diabolical hatred of Christ and His Church". As in other occupied territories, the German army confiscated church property, dissolved religious houses and arrested and exiled priests.

=== Western Europe ===
Low Countries

The German Occupation of the Netherlands was particularly protracted. While the Dutch civil service collaborated extensively with the occupying administration, the Dutch Church, and leaders like the Archbishop of Utrecht Johannes de Jong, firmly opposed Nazi movement, which Dutch Catholics were forbidden to join. As in other parts of the Third Reich, the Catholic press was suppressed. Clergy were arrested and forced out of educational positions. On 2 September 1940, the Nazi Governor of the Netherlands, Arthur Seyss-Inquart ordered a purge of clergy who refused to advocate Nazism. In November, the office of the Bishop of Roermond and the Hague headquarters of the Jesuits were raided. On 26 January 1941, the Dutch Bishops issued a critical Pastoral Letter. The Nazi-run press responded with threats, and also reported that Archbishop de Jong was fined for refusing to preach the German invasion of the Soviet Union was a "religious crusade" against Bolshevism. When Seyss-Inquart installed a Dutch Nazi at the head of the Catholic Workers' Union, De Jong told Catholics to quit the Union. The occupation of the Netherlands also saw a particularly efficient cruelty towards the Jews, and harsh punishment for their protectors. When Jewish deportations began, many were hidden in Catholic areas. Parish priests created networks hiding Jews. Close knit country parishes were able to hide Jews without being informed upon by neighbours, as occurred in the cities. On July 11, 1942, the Dutch bishops, joined all Christian denominations in sending a letter to the German General Friedrich Christiansen in protest against the treatment of Jews. The letter was read in all Catholic churches against German opposition. It brought attention to mistreatment of Jews and asked all Christians to pray for them:

Ours is a time of great tribulations of which two are foremost: the sad destiny of the Jews and the plight of those deported for forced labor. ... All of us must be aware of the terrible sufferings which both of them have to undergo, due to no guilt of their own. We have learned with deep pain of the new dispositions which impose upon innocent Jewish men, women and children the deportation into foreign lands. ... The incredible suffering which these measures cause to more than 10,000 people is in absolute opposition to the divine precepts of justice and charity. ... Let us pray to God and for the intercession of Mary ... that he may lend his strength to the people of Israel, so severely tried in anguish and persecution

— Protest of the Dutch Bishops, 1942

The Nazis responded by revoking the exception of Jews who were baptized, and a round up was ordered. The Gestapo made a special effort to round up every monk, nun and priest who had a drop of Jewish blood. Some 300 victims were deported to Auschwitz and immediately sent to the gas chambers, among them Saint Edith Stein who was killed at Auschwitz. According to John Vidmar writes, "The brutality of the retaliation made an enormous impression on Pius XII." Henceforth, he avoided open, confrontational denunciations of the Nazis. "It is clear from Maglione's intervention Papa Pacelli cared about and sought to avert the deportation of the Roman Jews but he did not denounce: a denunciation, the Pope believed, would do nothing to help the Jews. It would only extend Nazi persecution to yet more Catholics. It was the Church as well as the Jews in Germany, Poland and the rest of occupied Europe who would pay the price for any papal gesture. Another Dutch victim was Catholic dissident Carmelite priest and philosopher, Titus Brandsma. A journalist and a founder of the Netherlands' Catholic University in Nijmegen, Brandsma publicly campaigned against Nazism from the mid-1930s. Chosen by the Dutch Bishops as spokesmen in the defence of freedom of the press, he was arrested by the authorities in January 1942. He was later transferred to Dachau, where he was the subject of Nazi medical experiments and was issued with a lethal injection on 26 July 1942.

The Church played an important role in the defence of Jews in Belgium. The Comité de Défense des Juifs (CDJ) was formed to work for the defence of Jews in the summer of 1942. Of its eight founding members, Emile Hambresin was Catholic. Some of their rescue operations were overseen by the priests Joseph André and Dom Bruno. Among other institutions, the CDJ enlisted the help of monasteries and religious schools and hospitals. Yvonne Nèvejean of the Oeuvre Nationale de l'Enfance greatly assisted with the hiding of Jewish children. The Queen Mother Elizabeth and Léon Platteau of the Interior Ministry also made a stance to protect Jews. The Belgian Superior General of the Jesuits, Jean-Baptiste Janssens was also honoured as a Righteous Gentile by Yad Vashem. Following the German occupation of Belgium, the Primate of Belgium Jozef-Ernst Cardinal van Roey wrote a refutation of Nazi racial doctrines and of the incompatibility of Catholicism and Nazism. In a dialogue, Van Roey wrote that Catholics could never adapt to governments which "oppress the rights of conscience and persecute the Catholic Church"; asserted the right to freedom of the press; and said Catholics ought not resign themselves to defeat and collaboration with the Nazis, because "we are certain that our country will be restored and rise again".

France

Charles de Gaulle's Free French chose the Catholic symbolism of Joan of Arc's standard, the red Cross of Lorraine as the symbol of their cause.

Following the capitulation of France, the nation was divided between a military occupation of the north and the nominally independent "Vichy regime" in the south. Valerio Valeri remained nuncio to the divided nation. Marshal Philippe Pétain, the leader of the Vichy government had no religious convictions, but courted Catholic support. His great rival, and leader of the Free French, General Charles de Gaulle was a devout Catholic. De Gaulle's Free French chose the Catholic symbolism of Saint Joan of Arc's standard, the Cross of Lorraine, as their emblem.

As elsewhere under Nazi Germany's occupation, French clergy faced intimidation and interference. In July 1940, the residence of Cardinal Suhard, Archbishop of Paris, along with those of Cardinal Baudrillart and Cardinal Liénart and other church offices were searched by the Gestapo for "evidence of collusion between the late Cardinal Verdier and the Jews". Verdier had described World War II as "a crusade ... We are struggling to preserve the freedom of people throughout the world, whether they be great or small peoples, and to preserve their possessions and their very lives. No other war has had aims that are more spiritual, moral, and, in sum, more Christian". On September 9, the Bishop of Quimper was arrested for opposing Nazi plans for Brittany. The Bishop of Strasbourg was prevented from returning from Vichy France to his dioceses and his Cathedral was closed to the public. The Bishop of Metz was expelled from his diocese—which was itself later dissolved for "political reasons". In October, the Archbishop of Besançon and Vicar General Galen were jailed—the Archbishop for gathering food for French PoWs, and "turning people against Germans". Vatican Radio denounced the treatment of the Church in predominantly Catholic Alsace-Lorraine. In March 1941, it announced in Alsace, Catholics were facing "cruel persecution". On April 4, Vatican Radio stated that:

Former Catholic teachers must now give instruction in accordance with National Socialist programs; that membership in Hitler Youth organizations is obligatory for boys and girls over 10; that religious seminaries are being closed, all Catholic organizations are being dissolved, and that Catholic newspapers are being suppressed in Alsace-Lorraine; and that to the end of December of the preceding year, 20,000 persons had been expelled from Alsace, including 60 priests.

— Vatican Radio, 4 April 1941, describing persecution of Church in Alsace

The Catholic newspaper Esprit criticized Petain for his anti-semitic laws, and the paper was suppressed. The French bishops encouraged obedience to the Vichy regime and refrained from making public statements against the regime's mistreatment of Jews until 1942. In 1997, the French church issued a Declaration of Repentance for this approach. Soon after Pacelli became pope, Vichy France put forward antisemitic decrees. Vichy's ambassador to the Vatican, Léon Bérard, reported to his government that having spoken to competent authorities the Holy See had no insurmountable difficulties with this and did not intend to become involved. During the War, Cardinal Tisserant, called on the Vatican to forcefully condemn Nazism by name. Following the Velodrom d'Hiver roundup of Jews of July 15, 1942, the Northern assembly of cardinals and archbishops sent a protest letter to Petain, and following round ups of Jews in Vichy France in 1942, several Bishops—Archboshop Saliège of Toulouse, Bishop Théas of Montauban, Jean Delay (Archbishop), Cardinal Gerlier (Archbishop of Lyon), Monseigneur Edmund Vansteenberghe from Bayonne and Monseigneur Moussaron of Albi—denounced the roundups from the pulpit and parish distributions, in defiance of the Vichy regime. Thousands of priests, nuns and lay people acted to assist French Jews, protecting large numbers in convents, boarding schools, presbyteries and families. According to The New York Times, "The defiant attitude of those churchmen after 1942 contributed to the fact that that three quarters of France's Jewish population survived, many of them protected by French Catholics". French Catholic religious among the Righteous Among the Nations include: the Capuchin friar Père Marie-Benoît, Cardinal Gerlier, the Archbishop of Toulouse Jules-Géraud Saliège and Bishop of Montauban Pierre-Marie Théas.

Following the 4 June 1944 Liberation of Rome by the Allies, Cardinal Tisserant delivered a letter from De Gaulle to Pius XII, assuring the Pontiff of the filial respect and attachment of the French people; noting, their long wartime suffering was attenuated by the Pope's "testimonies of paternal affection". Pius thanked De Gaulle for his recognition of the charity works of the papacy for the victims of the war, and offered an Apostolic blessing upon De Gaulle and his nation. De Gaulle came to meet the Pope on 30 June; following which, the French leader wrote of great admiration for Pius, and assessed him to be a pious, compassionate and thoughtful figure. Upon whom, the problems of world situation weighed heavily. De Gaulle's visit was reported by the Vatican Press in the manner of a head of state, though the Vichy Regime had not yet been toppled. Following the fall of the Vichy government, De Gaulle told the Vatican the Papal Nuncio Valerio Valeri had become persona non grata to the French people, having worked with the Vichy regime. Valeri was replaced by Angelo Roncalli, the future John XXIII—however, prior to departing, Valeri was presented with the Legion d'honneur medal by De Gaulle.

== See also ==
- Nazi persecution of the Catholic Church in Germany
- Raphael's Verein

== Sources ==
- Phayer, Michael (2000). The Catholic Church and the Holocaust, 1930–1965. Bloomington and Indianapolis: Indiana University Press. ISBN 9780253337252.
- Phayer, Michael (2008). Pius XII, the Holocaust, and the Cold War. Bloomington and Indianapolis: Indiana University Press. ISBN 9780253349309.
