= Orientales Ecclesiae =

Orientales Ecclesiae is Latin for "Eastern Churches", and is used to refer to the Eastern Catholic Churches.

The term can also be a misspelling for the titles of either of two encyclicals of Pope Pius XII:

- Orientalis Ecclesiae – issued April 9, 1944, on St. Cyril, Patriarch of Antioch
- Orientales Ecclesias – issued December 15, 1952, on the persecution of the Eastern Churches
