= Summi =

Summi may refer to:

- Summi maeroris is one of several peace encyclicals of Pope Pius XII focusing in particular on the dangers to peace during the Holy Year.
- Summi Pontificatus is an encyclical of Pope Pius XII published on October 20, 1939.
