= Communium interpretes dolorum =

1945 papal encyclical by Pius XII

Communium interpretes dolorum Latin for 'Interpreter of the common anguish' Encyclical of Pope Pius XII
- Signature date: 15 April 1945
- Subject: On Ending the Second World War
- Number: 7 of 41 of the pontificate
- Text: In Latin; In English

Communium interpretes dolorum is an encyclical by Pope Pius XII stating an urgent need for World War II to end, appealing for prayers for peace during the month of May, 1945. It was delivered in Rome, at St. Peter's Basilica on Sunday, 15 April 1945, in the seventh year of his pontificate.

== Content ==
The encyclical states that the Pontiff, as interpreter of the universal anguish by which almost every nation is grievously distressed, desires to leave nothing undone to mitigate the numberless miseries and hasten the end of the great destruction. Men are unable to heal these great injuries. The human mind, blinded by hate and rivalry, cannot easily determine a just and equitable solution of affairs along with a fraternal agreement. Divine and human rights demand unequivocally that hideous slaughter cease as soon as possible.

The month of May of every year is dedicated to the Blessed Virgin Mother of God. The Pontiff asks all, especially the children, to pray through the intercession of Mary, that the peoples in discord, contention, and all kinds of misery, may be able to breathe again after their long-lasting distress and sorrow. Because of sins, men have turned away from God and created destruction.

- "Christian morals must be renewed both public and private life," he quotes Augustine, the Bishop of Hippo. "Change the heart and the work will be changed. Eradicate cupidity and plant charity." "Do you want peace? Do justice, and you will have peace. Justice and peace kiss one another."

It will not be easy to achieve peace in the middle of such great destruction. Many are still angry and hateful. Peace must be tempered by the impartial scale of justice, which embraces in fraternal charity all peoples and all nations and which does not bear hidden germs of discord and strife. Therefore, those who must come to agreement in this most grave cause, and those on whose recommendations not only the fate of their nations depends, but also the relationships of all mankind and the future course of the ages, especially need celestial help.

The Pope reminds of the many refugees, who are fugitives banished from their homeland and longing to once again see their own homes; for prisoners, and for those who lie in numberless hospitals. For these and for all others afflicted by this conflict he asks for prayers to the most merciful Mother of God.

== Analysis ==
The beginning of the encyclical is marked by the expression of a dramatic setting for the European continent, scarred by hatred, disagreement and destruction proportioned by war. This introduction is contrasted with the general, hopeful, tone of the document, with the pontiff looking to a future "radiating with hope".

In fact, for the pontiff, the key for this bright future lies on justice, a virtue intrinsically tied to peace.

But something more must be sought from the divine Redeemer and His most holy Mother by prayer and penance. We must seek a true and sincere peace, that may quickly end this calamitous and bloody conflict. In the midst of such great destruction and perturbation of affairs, while many are still angry and inimical to one another, it is certainly not easy to achieve such a peace. Peace must be tempered by the impartial scale of justice, which embraces in fraternal charity all peoples and all nations and which does not bear hidden germs of discord and strife.

— Pope Pius XII, Communium Interpretes Dolorum (English version), Paragraphs 4 and 5

The encyclical was also analyzed as a part of a trilogy of documents by Pope Pius XII about the future of post-war Europe as seen by the Pope, initiating from a more pastoral position until a more openly political tone. This trilogy is made by the encyclicals Communium Interpretes Dolororum, Fulgens radiatur and Summi Maeroris, seen as contrasting to the pontiff's "silence" in the years of World War II.
