= Magisterium (disambiguation) =

The magisterium is the teaching authority of the Catholic Church. It may also refer to:

- The philosopher's stone, a legendary substance in alchemy
- Non-overlapping magisteria, a view on the relationship between religion and science proposed by Stephen Jay Gould
- Magisterium of Pius XII, a collection of works by Pope Pius XII
- The Magisterium Series, a fantasy novel series by Holly Black and Cassandra Clare
- The Magisterium, a fictional religious organization in Philip Pullman's trilogy of fantasy novels His Dark Materials
