= Sacri =

Sacri may refer to:

- The Sacri Monti of Piedmont and Lombardy are a series of nine groups of chapels and other architectural features in northern Italy.
- Anni sacri (March 12, 1950), is an encyclical of Pope Pius XII issued on the twelfth anniversary of his coronation.
- The Quattro pezzi sacri or 4 sacred pieces is a compilation of vocal works by Giuseppe Verdi.
