= Magisterium of Pius XII =

Non-political messages of Pope Pius XII

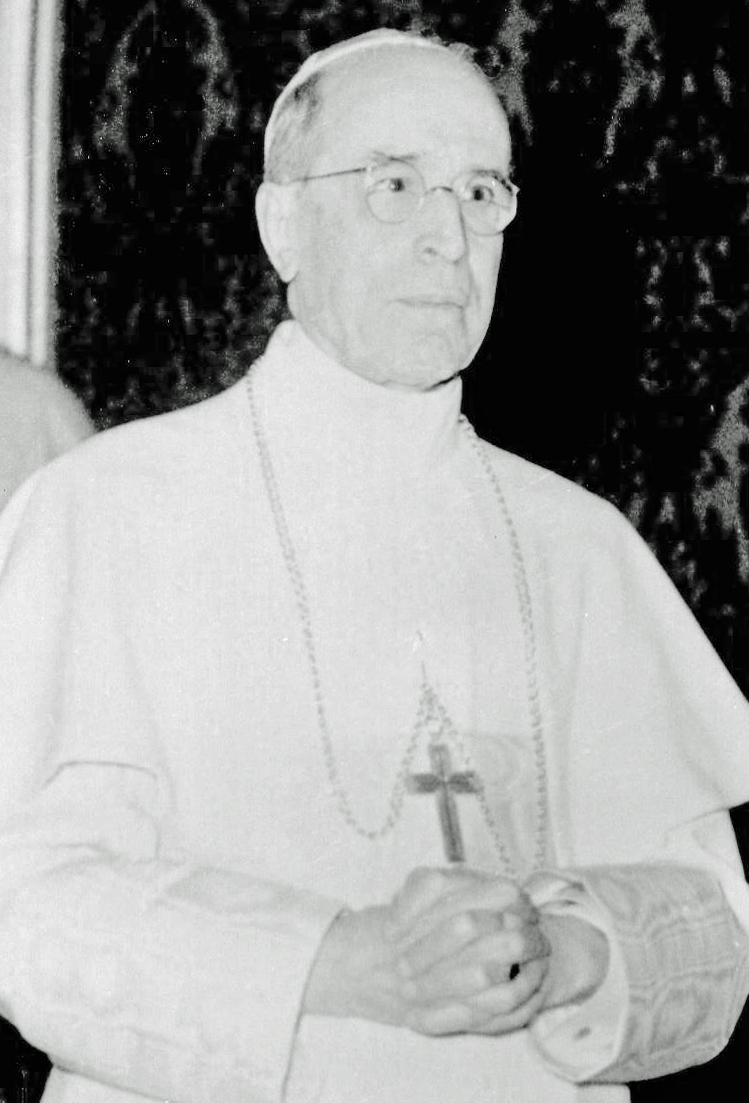
Pius XII photographed on 26 April 1958

The Magisterium of Pope Pius XII consists of some 1,600 mostly non-political speeches, messages, radio and television speeches, homilies, apostolic letters, and encyclicals of Pope Pius XII. His magisterium has been largely neglected or even overlooked by his biographers, who center on the policies of his pontificate.

The dates of the list may vary in accuracy. The list uses the official dates of the Discorsi and Acta Apostolicae Sedis, published by the Holy See. However, not all speeches are included there. Some were published in the Vatican newspaper, L'Osservatore Romano, and those dates reflect the date of publication since the articles often did not indicate a different time. Therefore, there may be a difference of a day or two in some instances. The sources are listed below.

Of the 1600 papal addresses, this list includes the last fifty during the last five months of his pontificate. They also illustrate the papal work load, up to the last days of his life. "He was the last Pope who wrote most of his speeches alone" said Cardinal Joseph Ratzinger. Pius, who did not have a staff of speechwriters or permanent assistants, worked largely alone, assisted only by occasional help and proofreaders from professors of the Pontifical Gregorian University. The combined length and scope of these 50 speeches, written within only 150 days, suggest a brutal work load for Pius, which may have contributed to his death. His physician, Professor Gasparini, commented: "The Holy Father did not die because of any specific illness. He was completely exhausted. He was overworked beyond limit. His heart was healthy, his lungs were good. He could have lived another 20 years, had he spared himself."

The last fifty papal addresses of Pope Pius XII
No.	Description and Topic	Destination	Date	Language
1.	The power of social justice and Christianity	Christian Unions of Italy	May 1, 1958	Italian
2.	Greetings and blessing	German Catholic Association Rupert Mayer	May 2, 1958	German
3.	The temptations of materialism in advertising	Italian workers from Naples	May 4, 1958	Italian
4.	Man in service of creation	International commission for irrigation and soil improvement	May 8, 1958	English
5.	Medicine based on natural law	British surgeons	May 12, 1958	
6.	Christian optimism and the defense of human rights	NATO Defence College	May 16, 1958	English
7.	Questions of military service and war	Female employees of the Italian army	May 21, 1958	Italian
8.	Your apostolate: Ladies Guild of Santa Susanna	Audience of American Women Association	May 22, 1958	English
9.	Religion, Science and true friendships	German Catholic Student Associations, erlangen	June 2, 1958	German
10.	Ethics of the medical profession	Spanish physicians	June 8, 1958	Spanish
11.	Modern family problems	International meeting in Paris, France	June 10, 1958	French
12.	Ethics of journalism	American Journalists	June 12, 1958	English
13.	Authentic Christian living increases priestly vocations	25. Anniversary of Colegio Pio in Brazil	June 20, 1958	Portuguese
14.	Ethical conflicts of Real Estate Agents	Conference of Italian real estate agents	June 22, 1958	Italian
15.	The art of otolarynologists in light of Christian philosophy	Congress of Otolarynologists	June 29, 1958	French
16.	The Church in China	Encyclical, Ad Apostolorum principis	June 29, 1958	Latin, several languages
17.	The role of women in public life	Catholic Action, Italy	July 2, 1958	Italian
18.	Rome before and after Christianity	Students from the USA	July 3, 1958	English
19.	Greetings and blessings	Faithful and clergy of Madagascar	July 5, 1958	French
20.	Two ideals of Christian woman	Female youth, Catholic Action, Italy	July 13, 1958	Italian
21.	The Church in its struggle for freedom	Encyclical, Meminisse iuvat	July 14, 1958	Latin, several languages
22.	The Contemplative Life, Part One	Radio audience for members of contemplative convents throughout the world	July 19, 1958	French
23.	The message of Lourdes to blue collar workers	International pilgrimage of Catholic blue collar workers to Lourdes	July 21, 1958	French
24.	The Contemplative Life, Part Two	Radio audience for members of contemplative convents throughout the World	July 26, 1958	French
25.	Problems and Ideals in the health sector	International Catholic Health Conference, Brussels, Belgium	July 27, 1958	French
26.	The meaning of biblical studies	International biblical congress, Brussels, Belgium	July 28, 1958	French
27.	The Contemplative Life, Part Three	Radio audience for members of contemplative convents throughout the World	August 2, 1958	French
28.	Classical antiquity as an educational force for Christianity	International Congress for Classical Archeology	August 7, 1958	French
29.	Christian academicians forming a Christian world?	World Congress of Pax Romana in Vienna, Austria	August 11, 1958	French
30.	The family as center of sanctification	Families from Spain	August 12, 1958	Spanish
31.	Purposes of the World Exhibition in Brussels	Message to World Exhibition in Brussels	August 15, 1958	French
32.	The unity of life and religious life	Exhortation to German Catholics meeting in Berlin	August 17, 1958	German
33.	The Third Order of St. Dominic Today	International congress of The Third Order of St. Dominic	August 20, 1958	French
34.	The relevance of blood group genetics for society	International Society for blood transfusions	September 5, 1958	French
35.	The importance of legal employees	Third International Congress of Legal Employees	September 8, 1958	French
36.	Psychopharmaca and related treatments in light of Christian Morality	Collegium Internationale Neuro-Psycho-Pharmacologicum, Rome	September 9, 1958	French
37.	Christian love a basis for organized aid	Pilgrimage of Spanish insurance agents	September 11, 1958	Spanish
38.	Hereditary problems and Christian conscience	International conference of haematology	September 12, 1958	French
39.	Purpose of Catholic schools	General meeting of Catholic educators	September 14, 1958	French
40.	The message of the Virgin Mary today	International Marian Congress, Lourdes	September 17, 1958	French
41.	Philosophy and Christian faith	International Congress of Philosophy, Venice and Padova	September 18, 1958	Italian
42.	The wonderful world of bees, usefulness and value for human life	International Congress of Bee Keepers	September 22, 1958	French
43.	The formation of Priests in our time	Rectors of Latin American seminaries	September 23, 1958	Spanish
44.	The ideals of Christian life	Eucharistic congress in Ecuador	September 28, 1958	Spanish
45.	Accident avoidance as a moral problem	International Association of Natural Gas Industries	September 28, 1958	French
46.	Call for a renewal of Christian life	Opening of the restored Cathedral in Reims, France	September 29, 1958	Latin
47.	Ethical considerations for book stores in train terminals	Owners of train station book stores	October 2, 1958	Italian
48.	Thinking about our guardian angels in October	American Pilgrims with Francis Cardinal Spellman	October 3, 1958	English
49.	Obligations of notaries in our time	International Congress	October 5, 1958	French
50.	Problems and perspectives concerning plastic surgery	Congress, Italian Society for Plastic Surgery	October 4, 1958	Italian
	Preparing yourself for the priesthood	Students of the theological seminary in Apulia, Italy		Italian
	The personality and magisterium of Pope Benedict XIV	200. anniversary of the death of Pope Benedict XIV		Italian

== Sources ==
- Acta Apostolicae Sedis. (AAS), Vatican City 1939–1958. Official documents of the Pontificate of Pope Pius XII
- Pio XII, Discorsi e Radio Messaggi di Sua Santita Pio XII, Vatican City 1939–1958, Official speeches of Pius XII, 20 vol.
- Pio XII, Discorsi Ai Medici collected byFiorenzo Angelini, Roma, 1959, 725 pages,
- Soziale Summe Pius XII ed. A.F.Utz, J.F.Gröner, 4010 pages. in German, the non-theological teachings 1939–1958, 3 vol.
- Pascalina Lehnert, Ich durfte ihm dienen. Erinnerungen an Papst Pius XII. Naumann, Würzburg, 1983.
