= Sertum laetitiae =

1939 papal encyclical by Pius XII

Sertum laetitiae Latin for 'The Crown of Joy' Encyclical of Pope Pius XII
- Signature date: 1 November 1939
- Subject: On the Hundred and Fiftieth Anniversary of the establishment of the hierarchy in the United States
- Number: 2 of 41 of the pontificate
- Text: In Latin; In English

Sertum laetitiae (November 1, 1939) is an encyclical from Pope Pius XII to the Catholic Church of the United States in memory of the 150th anniversary of the installation of the first American bishop.

== Content ==
The encyclical recalls Pope Pius VI, who appointed bishop John Carroll of Baltimore in 1789. It took the help of George Washington, a friend of Carroll, to formalize the erection of the first bishopric of the Catholic Church in the 13 colonies forming the United States. One hundred years later, in 1889, Pope Leo XIII in his encyclical Longinqua Oceani addressed the Church in the United States and issued praise and admonitions.

By 1939, the Church in the United States had nineteen provinces, 115 dioceses, 200 seminaries and numerous institutions. Pius XII, who recalls his official visit three years earlier, expresses his pride in these efforts. He praises the Catholic University of America in Washington, D.C. (which away back had offered him a professorship in 1903). The Pontiff supports the wishes of the American bishops to establish an American College in Rome.

The document also supported the use of radio, with Pius XII calling the "Marconi's radio" an "eloquent image of the Apostolic Faith the envelops all of humankind".

The encyclical advises Catholic bishops to be active in advancing racial justice by improving the access of Negroes to Catholic schools. It also critiques blind materialism. It asserts that individual happiness can only be achieved by obeying the Commandments of God, saying that non-observance undermines the basis of true civilization.

== Reception ==
The encyclical was officially published by the National Catholic Welfare Conference (NCWC), precursor of the now United States Conference of Catholic Bishops (USCCB), in 1939.

In fact, the document's publication, together with the entry of the United States in the Second World War and the contact of the American public with Nazi racism, provoked a declaration by the NCWC's Catholic episcopate at November 1942 on the necessity of "recognition and respect for the rights of citizens of color".

The encyclical was later analyzed as part of Pius XII's body of work related to Catholic social teaching, with the Pope being categorized as the last member of the "Leonine school". The document is also seen as a continuation of the Vatican's practice of strengthening ties with democratic nations through the interwar period and World War II.

== See also ==
- List of encyclicals of Pope Pius XII
