= Yvonne Nèvejean =

Belgian WWII resistance organization leader

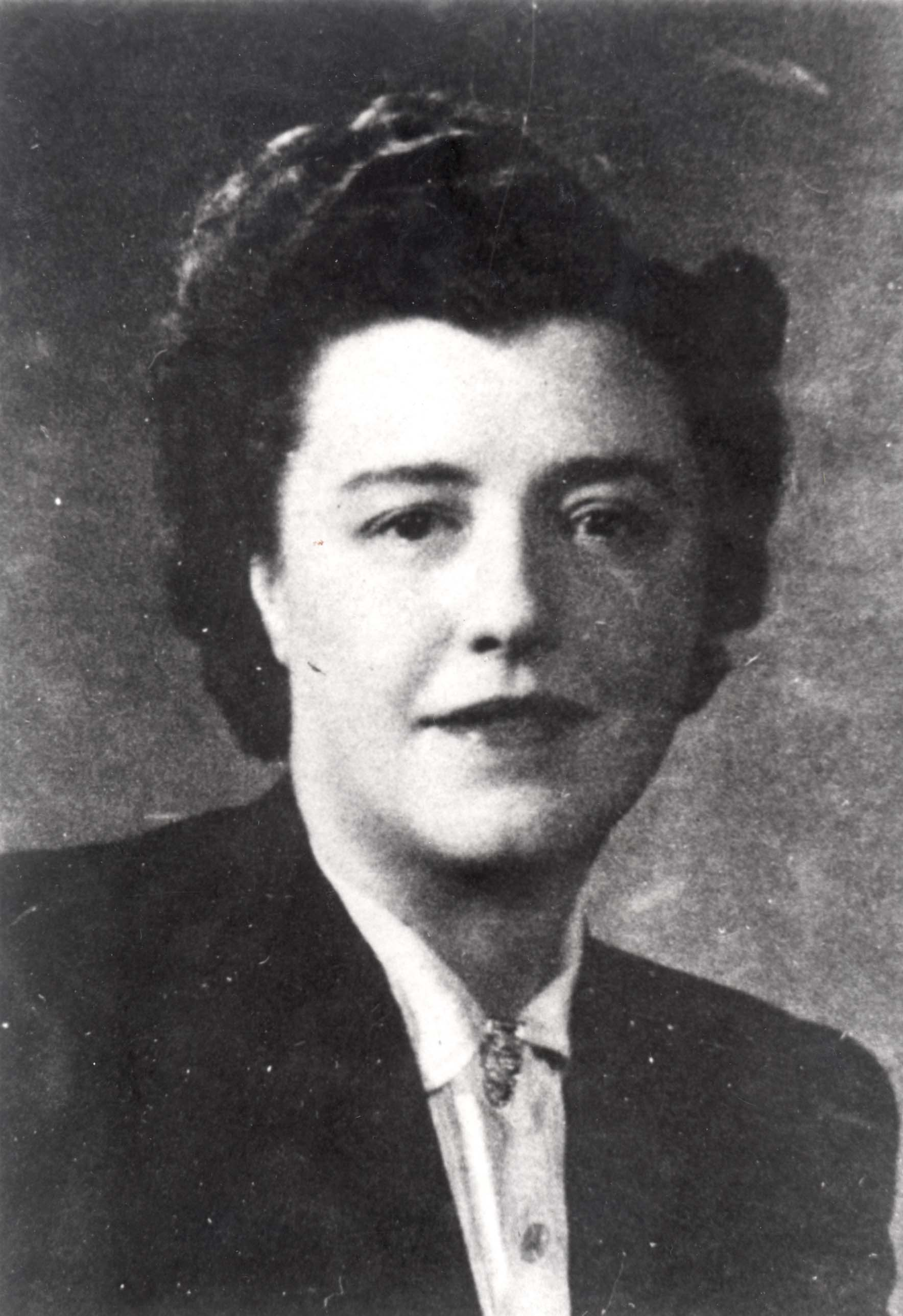
Yvonne Nèvejean

Yvonne Feyerick Nèvejean (1900–1987) was one of the leaders of an organisation that helped hide Jewish children in Nazi-occupied Belgium during World War II. She was instrumental in hiding about 4000 children, many with Catholic families and institutions. After the war she was honoured inside and outside Belgium. In 1965, she was designated as Righteous Among the Nations by Yad Vashem, the Holocaust Remembrance Authority in Jerusalem, and in 1996 a stamp was issued in Belgium bearing her image.

Born on November 15, 1900, in Gentbrugge, Nèvejean studied at the University of Ghent (Gand) and then in the USA where she was awarded a Master of Arts in Social and Political sciences at New York State University. After her return to Belgium in 1928, she started to work at the National Agency for Children (Oeuvre Nationale de l'Enfance; ONE), an organization that operated a network of children's homes throughout Belgium. She subsequently rose to head this organisation.

The Nazis began to deport Belgian Jews in the summer of 1942. At that time Nèvejean was approached by the Comité de Défence des Juifs en Belgique, Belgium's main Jewish underground organization (founded in 1942 by fr:Hertz Jospa), and asked to rescue Jewish children separated from their parents. Acting essentially on her own, Nèvejean agreed to have ONE place children with families and in institutions in order to protect them. Ultimately, she saved the lives of some 4,000 Jewish children.

The Jewish underground financed Nèvejean's extensive rescue operation, but when their funds were not sufficient, Nèvejean found funding from banks, the London-based Belgian government in exile, and the American Jewish Joint Distribution Committee. The Gestapo tried to stop Nevejean's operations, and arrested some rescuers and rescuees, but they were generally unsuccessful due to the brave stand made by Nèvejean and other Belgians, such as the Queen Mother Elizabeth and Leon Platteau of the Belgian Ministry of Justice, both also designated "Righteous Among The Nations" by Yad Vashem.

A Belgian priest, Father Joseph André, of Namur was also prominent in this movement.
