= Raphael's Verein =

Raphael's Verein was the name of a secret Catholic network that operated during the Second World War and sought to rescue Jews and others who were in danger of being interned in concentration camps. It was allegedly created on behalf of Pope Pius XII.
