= Quemadmodum =

1946 encyclical of Pope Pius XII

Quemadmodum Latin for 'While' Encyclical of Pope Pius XII
- Signature date: 6 January 1946
- Subject: pleading for the care of the World's destitute children
- Number: 9 of 41 of the pontificate
- Text: In Latin; In English

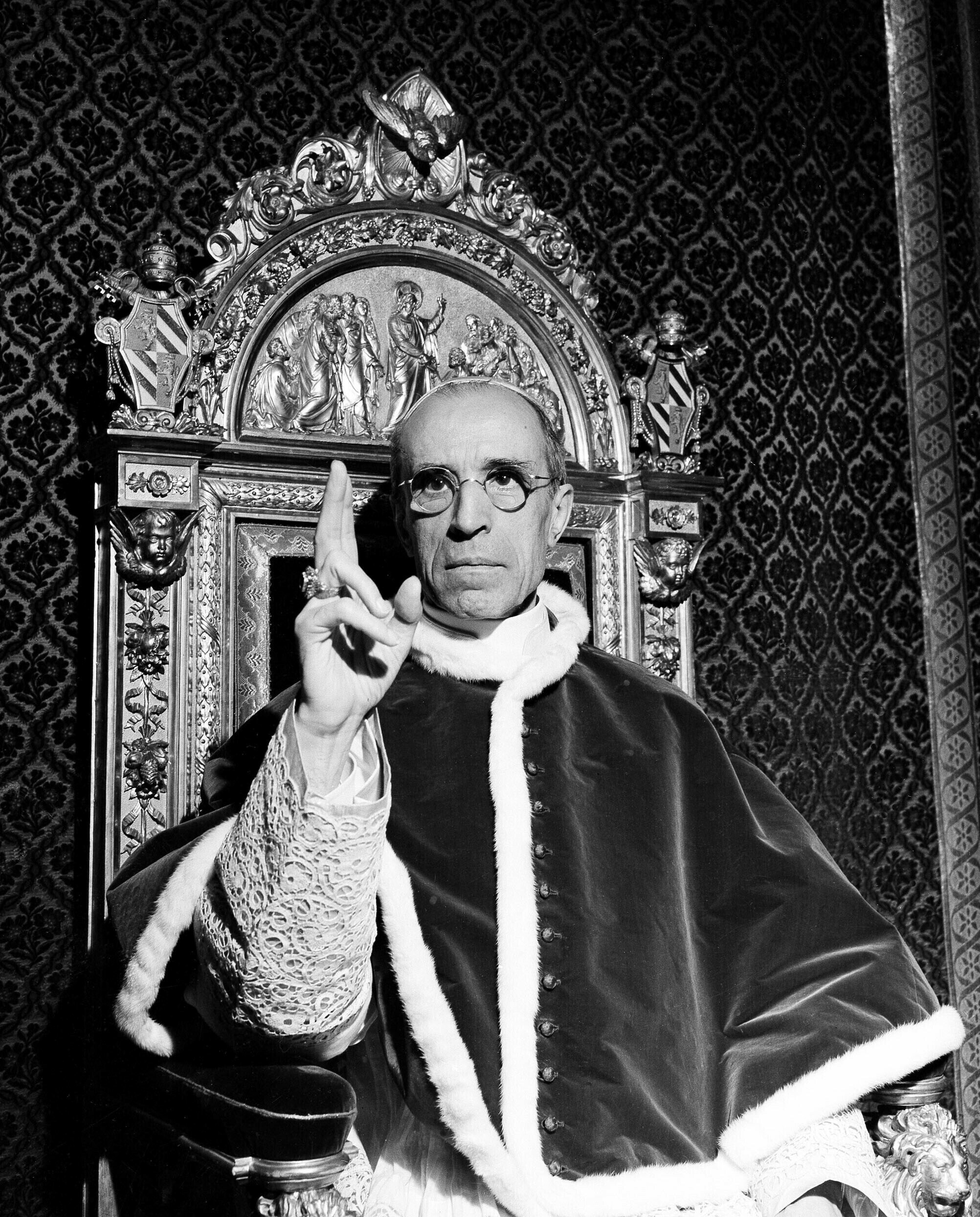
Pope Pius XII

Quemadmodum is an encyclical of Pope Pius XII pleading for the care of the world's destitute children after World War II, given at St. Peter's, Rome, on 6 January, Feast of the Epiphany, in 1946, the seventh of his Pontificate.

The document was well received by Catholics in the New World, specially in the United States, Brazil, Argentina, Mexico and Canada.

The theme about caring for the children affected by war was already written about in the past by Pope Benedict XV after World War I in his encyclical Paterno Iam Diu, published in November 1919.

== Content ==
The Pope points out that during World War II, he used all his powers of persuasion to end the conflict and secure a peace based on justice, equity, and right. As the war ended, he left nothing undone to provide relief to several war-torn nations.

There are millions of innocent children in many countries without the basic necessities of life, suffering from cold, hunger, and disease. The Pontiff and his aid organizations have helped many of them, but their assistance has been inadequate for the immense task. He therefore turns to the bishops of the world, asking for additional help and relief.

The Pope orders, that in each Catholic dioceses, a day of public prayers must be assigned to admonish the faithful of this urgent need and exhort them to support by their prayers, good works and offerings for needy and abandoned children. "Amen I say to you, as long as you did it for one of these, the least of my brethren, you did it for me" (Matt. 25, 40).

The Pontiff points out that these children will be pillars of the next generation, and therefore it is essential that they grow up healthy in mind and body. Nobody should hesitate, then, to contribute time and money to a cause so opportune and essential. The less wealthy should give what they can with an open hand and a willing heart. Those who live in luxury should reflect and remember that the indigence, hunger, and nakedness of these children will constitute a grave and severe indictment of them before God. All should be convinced that their liberality will not be loss but gain. One who gives to the poor is lending to God Who, in His own time, will repay his generosity with abundant interest.
