= Datis nuperrime =

1956 papal encyclical by Pius XII

Datis nuperrime Latin for 'A new dawn' Encyclical of Pope Pius XII
- Signature date: 5 November 1956
- Number: 35 of 41 of the pontificate
- Text: In Latin; In English

Datis nuperrime is an encyclical of Pope Pius XII dated 5 November 1956 concerning the Soviet invasion of Hungary to suppress the Hungarian Revolution of 1956. This is a second encyclical protesting the oppression of the Hungarian people. Pope Pius, as in his previous protests, does not mention the Soviet Union by name.

== Quotations from the Encyclical ==
- But tidings have reached Us lately, which fill Our heart with pain and sorrow. There is being shed again in the cities, towns, and villages of Hungary, the blood of citizens, who long with all their hearts for their rightful freedom. National institutions which had just been restored, have been overthrown again and violently destroyed. A blood-drenched people has been reduced once more to slavery by the armed might of foreigners.
- We cannot help but deplore and condemn, for so Our consciousness of Our office bids Us, these unhappy events which fill all Catholics and all free peoples with deepest sorrow and indignation. May those whose commands have caused these tragic events, come to realize that the rightful freedom of a people cannot be extinguished by the shedding of human blood.
- We, who watch over all peoples with a father's concern, assert that any violence and any bloodshed which anyone unjustly causes, can never be tolerated. On the contrary, We exhort all people and all classes of society to a peace, which finds its basis in justice, liberty, and love.
