= Luctuosissimi eventus =

1956 papal encyclical by Pius XII

Luctuosissimi eventus Latin for 'The saddest events' Encyclical of Pope Pius XII
- Signature date: 28 October 1956
- Number: 33 of 41 of the pontificate
- Text: In Latin; In English

Luctuosissimi eventus, issued October 28, 1956, is an encyclical of Pope Pius XII urging public prayers for peace and freedom for the people of Hungary.

The Pope is "deeply moved by the sorrowful events which have befallen the people of Eastern Europe and especially of our beloved Hungary, which is now being soaked in blood by a shocking massacre. And not only is our heart moved, but so too are the hearts of all men who cherish the rights of civil society, the dignity of man, and the liberty which is due to individuals and to nations".

He appeals for public prayer, for an end of the carnage, and for peace and for freedom. He indicates that violence will not create a lasting order and freedom can never be extinguished by external force. The Pope recalls his visit to Budapest, where he took part in an international Eucharistic Congress as personal representative of Pope Pius XI. He is sure that the same faith in and love for God still inspire the hearts of the Hungarian people even though the champions of atheistic communism attempt with every possible means to despoil their minds of the religion of their forefathers. He asks all true Christians throughout the world to join in prayer with their oppressed Hungarian brothers. He especially asks children worldwide for a prayer crusade:

We have no doubt that Christians everywhere, in cities, towns, and villages, wherever the light of the Gospel shines, and especially boys and girls, will most willingly respond to Our entreaties to which yours will be added.

Pope Pius XII is convinced that through prayer a peaceful revolution in Eastern Europe will happen, not only for the "Hungarian people who are tortured by such great suffering and drenched in so much blood" but for all people of Eastern Europe, who are deprived of religious and civil liberty. They will be able, with the inspiration and help of God, which is sought in so many prayers, and through the intercession of the Virgin Mary, to resolve these problems peacefully in justice and right order, with due respect for the rights of "God and Jesus Christ, our King."
