= Anni sacri =

1950 papal encyclical by Pius XII

Anni sacri Encyclical of Pope Pius XII
- Signature date: 12 March 1950
- Number: 16 of the pontificate

Anni sacri (March 12, 1950) issued on the twelfth anniversary of his coronation, is an encyclical of Pope Pius XII on a program combating atheism.

The encyclical states:

The war is over but peace has not yet arrived. The reason for this is, that unjust lies are substituted for truth. In some countries the press turns against religion and ridicules religious feelings. In many others, there is continued persecution of the Christian faithful. It is therefore necessary in this Holy Year 1950, to preach the truth and the true gospel of Christ.

Pope Pius XII calls for Church-wide efforts, to begin a veritable crusade of prayer among the faithful to implore suitable remedies for the present evils. He requests worldwide public prayers on March 26, Passion Sunday. The Pope will on that day descend into the Basilica of St. Peter to pray not only with the whole Catholic world. Those who, because of illness or old age or other reasons, cannot come to church, are requested to pray at home.
