= Orientalis Ecclesiae =

1944 papal encyclical by Pius XII

Orientalis ecclesiae Latin for 'Of the Eastern Church' Encyclical of Pope Pius XII
- Signature date: 9 April 1944
- Subject: On St. Cyril, Patriarch of Alexandria
- Number: 6 of 41 of the pontificate
- Text: In Latin; In English

Orientalis Ecclesiae (English: Of the Eastern Church) is an encyclical issued by Pope Pius XII on 9 April 1944. It celebrates the life and work of St. Cyril, Patriarch of Alexandria on the occasion of the fifteenth centenary of his death, marking both a continuation of the Pope's posture to Eastern Christianity that was initiated by Leo XIII, and a contrast with the Roman Curia in the same matter.

== Content and analysis ==
The encyclical has both pastoral and commemorative tones, celebrating the life and works of Cyril of Alexandria and enthroning the saint as an example of eastern patriarch that, together with being a great theologian, fought for papal supremacy. In a pastoral note, Pius makes an appeal to the "separated Eastern churches" to come back to the jurisdiction of Rome, with the pontiff ensuring "respect for the ancient traditions" and lauding the possibility of "variety in unity". The same appeal would be repeated later in the encyclical Orientales omnes Ecclesias, addressed to the "persecuted Eastern Church".

The document's publication marks a contrast between Pius XII and the remaining Roman Curia. The Curia didn't maintain relations with the Eastern Orthodox in reason of seeing them as "adversaries of Catholicism" in Eastern Europe. Although, it is of note that the pontiff rejected ecumenical advances, based on Mortalium animos, an encyclical by Pius XI.
