= Joseph André =

Belgian priest

- Curate; Chaplain
- Church: Roman Catholic Church
- Archdiocese: Mechelen–Brussels
- Province: Mechelen-Brussels
- Diocese: Namur

Orders
- Ordination: 1936

Personal details
- Born: 14 March 1908
- Died: 1 June 1973 (aged 65) Namur
- Occupation: Teacher

Joseph André (14 March 1908 – 1 June 1973) was a Catholic priest of the diocese of Namur, Belgium. He was declared Righteous among the Nations by the government of Israel in 1968.

== Early life ==
After two years (1926–28) with the Jesuits where he could not stay because of his frail health and weak contact with his religion, he entered the seminary of Namur. Ordained priest in 1936, he was teacher in a high school (Floreffe) for a few years before being appointed curate at the parish of St Jean-Baptiste (Namur).

== Shelter for Jewish children ==
In 1941, with Belgium under German occupation, the parish youth center (located exactly next to the Gestapo 'Kommandantur' of Namur) became the hub of a vast clandestine organization under his leadership, aiming to save Jewish children from deportation and certain death. It was a transit house where children were sheltered - sometime more than 20 together - for as few days as possible before being entrusted to religious institutions or rural families where they could remain in hiding. To feed them, Fr André and his collaborators went about the country, from farm to farm, begging for food, hams, bread, cheese, and on the look out for more shelters for his protégés. With a personal love for Jews and a profound respect for religious freedom, Father André never tried to convert or baptize the children. Though he was occasionally suspected by the Gestapo, and several times interrogated, his center and organization were never uncovered and remained active till the end of the war.

== Friend of Israel ==
After the war he carried out social and charitable activities in connection with the Service social des Juifs of Belgium. Living very poorly by choice, he had an evangelical love for the marginalized and the lost. As Chaplain of the Namur jail from 1957 till his death, he opened a welcome center for ex-convicts, illegal migrants and political refugees: the 'Chateau de Bomel' (Namur). Always interested in the destiny of the Jewish people and fascinated by the mystery of Israel he closely followed the birth of the new state in 1948. In 1967 he received the highest honour of the nation: he was declared "Righteous Among the Nations" and a tree in his name was planted in Yad Vashem. The following year the frail man, always in a black cassock, was invited to New York City by the United Jewish Appeal and greeted by more than a thousand Jews.

== Death ==
Fr André was found dead in his office of the Namur jail on 1 June 1973.

== Sources ==
Hennaux, Jean-Marie: L'abbé Joseph André (1908–1973), apôtre de l'amitié judéo-chrétienne, in Pâque Nouvelle, 2001, N°2, pp. 12–20.
