= Fulgens radiatur =

1947 encyclical of Pope Pius XII

Fulgens radiatur Latin for 'The Radiant Light' Encyclical of Pope Pius XII
- Signature date: 21 March 1947
- Subject: Saint Benedict, in occasion of the destruction of the Monastery of Monte Cassino during the Second World War
- Number: 11 of 41 of the pontificate
- Text: In Latin; In English

Fulgens radiatur (English: 'The Radiant Light') issued 21 March 1947 is an encyclical of Pope Pius XII on Saint Benedict. It was written in the context of the heavy destruction of the Benedictine Monte Cassino monastery during the Battle of Monte Cassino in World War II.
