= Summi Pontificatus =

1939 encyclical by Pope Pius XII

Summi Pontificatus Latin for 'Of the Supreme Pontificate' Encyclical of Pope Pius XII
- Signature date: 20 October 1939
- Subject: On the Unity of Human Society
- Number: 1 of 41 of the pontificate
- Text: In Latin; In English

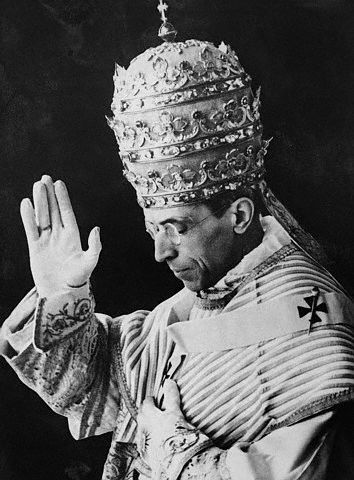
Coronation photograph of Pius XII, 1939

Summi Pontificatus is an encyclical of Pope Pius XII published on 20 October 1939. The encyclical is subtitled "on the unity of human society". It was the first encyclical of Pius XII and was seen as setting a tone for his papacy. It criticizes what it saw as major errors of the time, such as ideologies of racism, cultural superiority, and the totalitarian state. It also sets the theological framework for future encyclical letters such as Mystici corporis Christi (1943). The encyclical laments the occupation of Poland, denounces the Molotov–Ribbentrop Pact, and calls for a restoration of independent Poland.

== The unity of human society ==
Summi Pontificatus sees Christianity being universalised and opposed to racial hostility and superiority. There are no racial differences which destroy the unity of the human race, because the human race forms a unity, as "one ancestor (Adam) made all nations to inhabit the whole earth".

What a wonderful vision, which makes us contemplate the human race in the unity of its origin in God ... in the unity of its nature, composed equally in all men of a material body and a spiritual soul; in the unity of its immediate end and its mission in the world; in the unity of its dwelling, the earth, whose benefits all men, by right of nature, may use to sustain and develop life; in the unity of its supernatural end: God himself, to whom all ought to tend; in the unity of the means for attaining this end; ... in the unity of the redemption wrought by Christ for all.

This divine law of solidarity and charity assures that all men are truly brethren, without excluding the rich variety of persons, cultures and societies.

=== Human and cultural diversity ===
Summi Pontificatus teaches that different levels of development within and between nations are source for enrichment of the human race.

The nations, despite a difference of development due to diverse conditions of life and of culture, are not destined to break the unity of the human race, but rather to enrich and embellish it by the sharing of their own peculiar gifts and by that reciprocal interchange of goods.

=== Solidarity and charity ===
Because of their common origin and their ensuing equality, solidarity and charity are mandatory for all people. The principle of solidarity, which can be articulated in terms of "friendship" or "social charity", is a direct demand of human and Christian brotherhood.

An error, "today abundantly widespread, is disregard for the law of human solidarity and charity, dictated and imposed both by our common origin and by the equality in rational nature of all men, whatever nation they belong to. This law is sealed by the sacrifice of redemption offered by Jesus Christ on the altar of the Cross to his heavenly Father, on behalf of sinful humanity."

Forgetfulness of the law of universal charity may lead to conflict and war. Charity alone can create and consolidate peace by extinguishing hatred and softening envies and dissensions in the relations between nations.

== The totalitarian state ==
In what most saw as a rejection of totalitarianism, Summi Pontificatus rejected the idea of the state as "something ultimate to which everything else should be subordinated":

But there is yet another error no less pernicious to the well-being of the nations and to the prosperity of that great human society which gathers together and embraces within its confines all races. It is the error contained in those ideas which do not hesitate to divorce civil authority from every kind of dependence upon the Supreme Being—First Source and absolute Master of man and of society—and from every restraint of a Higher Law derived from God as from its First Source. Thus they accord the civil authority an unrestricted field of action that is at the mercy of the changeful tide of human will, or of the dictates of casual historical claims, and of the interests of a few."

=== A threat to its families and education ===
Summi Pontificatus goes on to state:

However, and lest it be forgotten that man and the family are by nature anterior to the State, and that the Creator has given to both of them powers and rights and has assigned them a mission and a charge that correspond to undeniable natural requirements.

Summi Pontificatus holds that in that case education would aim at "a one-sided formation of those civic virtues that are considered necessary for attaining political success, while the virtues which give society the fragrance of nobility, humanity and reverence would be inculcated less, for fear they should detract from the pride of the citizen." This would "bear most bitter fruits". The encyclical concedes that formation should prepare the youth to fulfill "the offices of a noble patriotism which give to one's earthly fatherland all due measure of love, self-devotion and service", it adds that "a formation which forgot or, worse still, deliberately neglected to direct the eyes and hearts of youth to the heavenly country would be an injustice".

=== A danger to World peace ===
The principles of natural and international law are not an option but indispensable, because the totalitarian state is a threat to peace:

The idea which credits the State with unlimited authority is not simply an error harmful to the internal life of nations, to their prosperity, and to the larger and well-ordered increase in their well-being, but likewise it injures the relations between peoples, for it breaks the unity of supra-national society, robs the law of nations of its foundation and vigor, leads to violation of others' rights and impedes agreement and peaceful intercourse.

=== The German/Soviet attack on Poland ===
Summi Pontificatus, in line with the theological and non-political nature of Papal encyclicals of the past, does not mention explicitly definite names or countries, as many of his accusations against racism, racial segregation superiority and exploitation are far-reaching and of a moral nature. An exception is the fate of occupied Poland. For its specific criticism of the attack and occupation of Poland the encyclical was lauded by the western Allies, and Polish refugees outside Nazi and Soviet control likewise approved of the pope's call for restoration of an independent Polish state.

"The blood of countless human beings, even noncombatants, raises a piteous dirge over a nation such as Our dear Poland, which, for its fidelity to the Church, for its services in the defense of Christian civilization, written in indelible characters in the annals of history, has a right to the generous and brotherly sympathy of the whole world, while it awaits, relying on the powerful intercession of Mary, Help of Christians, the hour of a resurrection in harmony with the principles of justice and true peace."

== Consequences ==
Summi Pontificatus incorporates general principles of the draft for an encyclical, Humani generis unitas, against racism and anti-semitism, prepared by several Jesuits for their Father General; but unlike that draft, Summi Pontificatus does not refer specifically to injustices directed against Jews. Pope Pius XI was editing and putting the finishing touches on Humani generis unitas when he died in February 1939, and his successor, Pope Pius XII, subsequently chose not to publish it, possibly in light of strong anti-Judaic or anti-rabbinic language in parts of it, which could be misunderstood by the faithful or perverted by pro-Axis media. After the draft was made public in 1995, there was controversy as to whether Pope Pius XII should have published more of it.

=== International reactions ===
Contemporaneous reactions to Summi Pontificatus were strong. While some Nazis played it down, Diego von Bergen, the German ambassador to the Vatican, said: "Pope Pius wanted to hit with this encyclical primarily the Third Reich." The U.S. Catholic League stated that the Gestapo considered the encyclical an attack. The British and French authorities at war with Germany welcomed it and the French had copies printed and dropped by air over Germany. Germany stopped its printing and distribution and the Gestapo ordered enquiries into people who read or tried to distribute it. The New York Times published the encyclical on 28 October 1939 under the headline: "Dictators, Treaty-Breaking and Racism are Condemned by the Pope in his First Encyclical" writing: "A powerful attack on totalitarianism and the evils which he considers it has brought upon the world was made by Pope Pius XII in his first encyclical … It is Germany that stands condemned above any country or any movement in this encyclical—the Germany of Hitler and National Socialism."

It did the Allies no harm when 61,000,000 German and Polish Catholics were told by the leader of their religion that "the idea which credits the State with unlimited authority" was abhorrent to him. "To consider the State as something ultimate to which everything else should be subordinated and directed cannot fail to harm the true and lasting prosperity of nations," read the Encyclical. The Pontiff wrote that the totalitarian system of government was an idea which "robs the law of nations of its foundation and vigor, leads to violation of others' rights, and impedes agreement and peaceful intercourse."

== See also ==
- List of encyclicals of Pope Pius XII

== Sources ==
- Encyclical Summi Pontificatus on the Vatican website
