= Meminisse iuvat =

1958 Pope Pius XII encyclical

Meminisse iuvat Latin for 'It is helpful to recall' Encyclical of Pope Pius XII
- Signature date: 14 July 1958
- Subject: On prayers for the persecuted Church
- Number: 41 of 41 of the pontificate
- Text: In Latin; In English

Meminisse iuvat (14 July 1958) is an encyclical of Pope Pius XII, asking for prayers for the persecuted Church in the East and criticizing harmful cultural developments in the West. He asks for a novena of prayer preceding the feast of the Assumption.

The encyclical reminds its readers, that during the Second World War the Pope did not simply preach peace or work on better understanding between the war parties. Most importantly, he consecrated the whole human race to the Immaculate Heart of Mary, the mother of God. Twelve years later, war is over, but peace has not yet arrived. The new atomic weapons can annihilate not only the vanquished but also the victors.

== Critique of the West ==
The problems and crisis of humanity continue to exist, because God, the source and guarantor of justice, the fountain of truth, the basis of all laws, is denied his proper place or, worse, completely disregarded. If a house is not built on a solid and sure foundation, it tumbles down; if a mind is not enlightened by the divine light, it strays more or less from the whole truth; if citizens, peoples, and nations are not animated by brotherly love, strife is born, waxes strong, and reaches full growth. Christianity teaches the full truth, real justice, and divine charity, which drives away hate, bad intentions and enmity. A return to Christian principles would establish a society that is strong, just, and equitable. The Pope is firmly convinced that, whatever the obstacles or persecutions, Christianity will always win over her enemies. "It is a harmful and reckless policy to do battle with Christianity, for God guarantees, and history testifies, that she shall exist forever." Yet, in some unnamed countries—the Pope clearly points to the West—Christian principles and the Catholic religion are not given their proper place. Unsuspecting and uneducated young people easily fall for the temptations of seductive allurements of vice, as writers and publishers and movies continue to stir up vicious and violent appetites solely for the sake of gain.

== Persecution in the East ==
In the East, persecutions against the Church continue. As a result, many bishops have been driven from their sees or so impeded that they cannot freely exercise their ministry; they have even been cast into prison or exiled. In those countries, newspapers, magazines, and other publications put out by Catholics have been almost completely silenced, as if truth were subject to the exclusive control and discretion of political rulers, and as though divine and human learning and the liberal arts need not be free if they are to flourish for the public and common good. Catholic schools are closed or replaced with institutes of the State which teach nothing at all about God or religion. Missionaries are expelled, jailed or unable to help the faithful. Governments choose and appoint bishops, as if the Catholic Church were a creature of a single nation, dependent on its civil authority, and not a divine institution extending to all peoples.

But most of the faithful, of both the Latin and the Oriental rites, are practicing and defending their ancestral faith tenaciously. Gratefully, the Pope exhorts those who are under many dangerous and deceitful pressures—pressures which would urge them to stop supporting the firm, solid, and constant unity of the Church: "He who does not have the Church as his mother, cannot have God as his father. The Church, founded by Christ can be attacked, but not defeated, for she draws her strength from God, not from man. Just as Christ our Redeemer rose in triumph, so the Church shall some day win a peaceful victory over all her enemies."

The Pope encourages the faithful in the East to have confidence, and to be brave and steadfast soldiers, quoting St. Ignatius, the martyr: "We wish to counsel you in the words of St. Ignatius, martyr, although We know you do not require such counsel: "Serve him for whom you fight. ... May none of you desert him! Your baptism must be a shield; your faith a helmet; your charity a lance; your patience a suit of armour. Your works should be your credentials, so that you may be worthy to receive your reward."

== Church will triumph ==
Empires and mighty states have fallen but the Church stands unmoved among the waves of this world, for she is built on the apostolic rock and holds fast to her foundation, unmoved by the onslaughts of the raging sea. Nothing can even shake her, Pope Pius teaches, because, as many physical elements of this world crash with thunder around her, she continues to provide a safe port. As half of Christianity suffers persecution, the other half is united with their brothers and sisters in prayer, that better times may quickly come upon the whole Church.

== Text ==
- Meminisse iuvat, in Acta Apostolicae Sedis 1958, 440
- English translation
