= Summi maeroris =

1950 papal encyclical by Pius XII

Summi maeroris Encyclical of Pope Pius XII
- Signature date: 19 July 1950
- Number: 17 of the pontificate

Summi maeroris is one of several peace encyclicals of Pope Pius XII focusing in particular on the dangers to peace during the Holy Year. It was given at Rome, at St. Peter's on July 19, 1950, the twelfth year of his Pontificate.

The Pope portrays a mixed picture of his time: on one hand there are millions of people who come to Rome as pilgrims from all nations of the world. They give testimony of oneness in faith, brotherly unity, and piety. On the other, the present social conditions of the people give reason for high anxiety and concern. The call for hate and class-warfare is not going to solve any problems. They need to be tackled not with violence but by the law of justice. In addition, the spectre of another war is looming:

- Whatever the genius of man has produced that is beautiful and good and holy, all of this can be practically annihilated.

Real peace is only possible on the basis of Christian principles: Such principles and norms, in fact, recall men to truth, justice and charity; they put a restraint on their unruly desires; they force the senses to be obedient to reason; they move the reason to obey God; they produce this effect, "that all men, even those who are rulers of the peoples, may recognize the freedom that is due to religion, which, beyond its primary purpose of leading souls to eternal salvation, has also another, of safeguarding and protecting the very foundations of the State."

But, referring to Eastern Europe and China, without mentioning these countries, the Pope continues, in some parts of the world, these principles are trampled upon and the rights of the Church are violated. They forbid her ministers the free exercise of religious worship. They even condemn them to exile and to prison. They impede or directly proscribe and destroy schools and institutes of education which are conducted according to Christian norms and principles. There was always persecution and armed violence against the Church. The Church desires to win over peoples and to educate them to virtue and right social living, not by means of arms but with the truth.
