= Catholic resistance to the Holocaust =

Catholic efforts to oppose or help victims of the Holocaust

Catholic resistance to the Holocaust

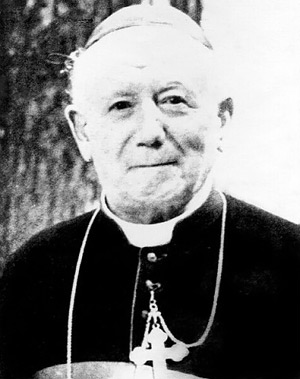
Jules-Géraud Saliège of Toulouse

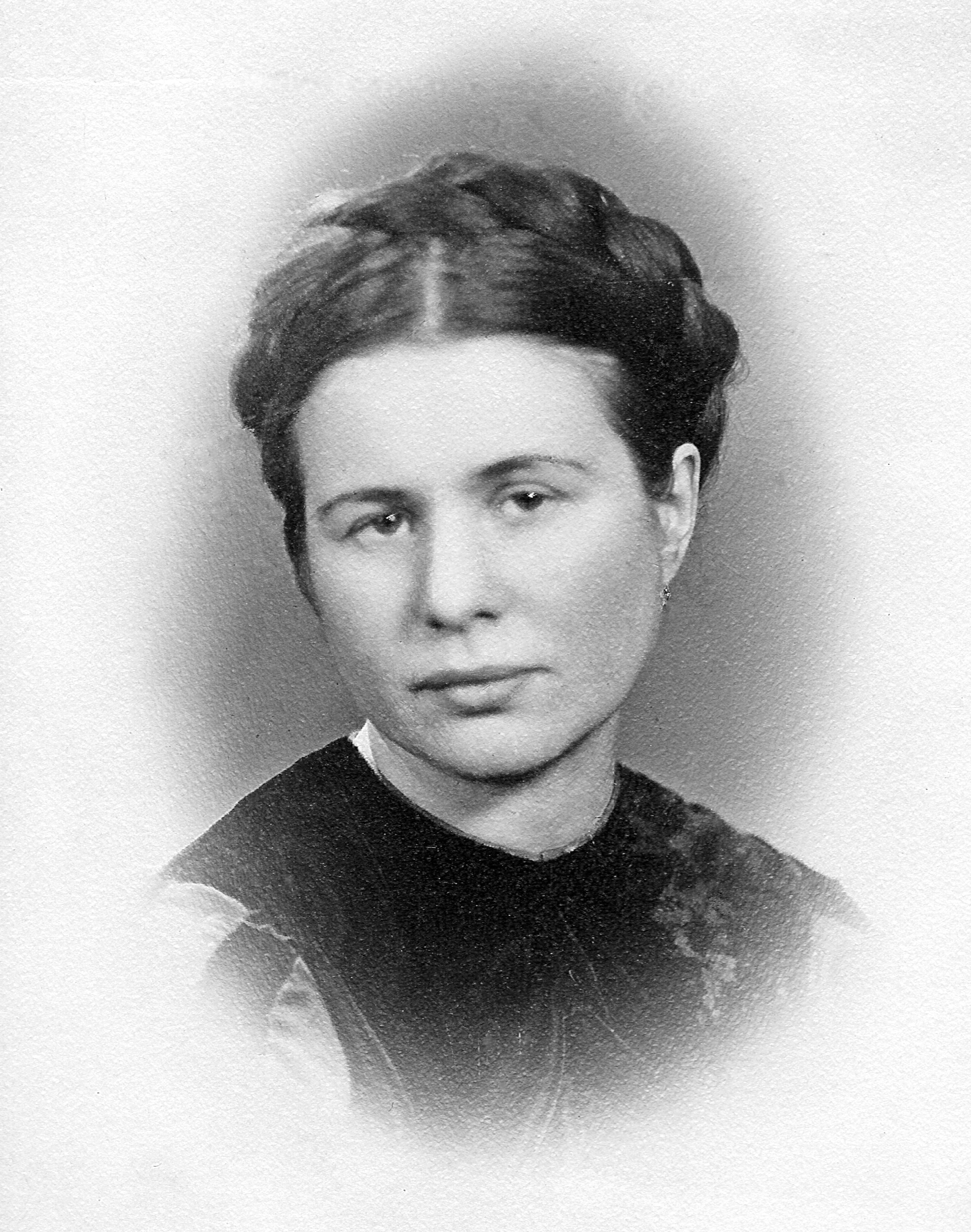
Irena Sendlerowa

Catholic resistance to the Holocaust was part of Catholic resistance to Nazi Germany and of Resistance during World War II. The role of the Catholic Church during the Nazi years remains a matter of much contention.

Catholic resistance to the mistreatment of Jews in Germany was generally limited to fragmented and largely individual efforts. But in every country under German occupation, priests played a major part in rescuing Jews. The Israeli historian Pinchas Lapide estimated that Catholic rescue of Jews amounted to somewhere between 700,000 and 860,000 people and credited this to Pope Pius XII, though the figure is contested. The martyrs Maximilian Kolbe, Giuseppe Girotti and Bernhard Lichtenberg were among those killed in part for aiding Jews. Among the notable Catholic networks that rescued Jews and others were Hugh O'Flaherty's "Rome Escape Line", set up at the behest of Pius XII, the Assisi Network and Poland's Żegota.

Bishops such as the Netherlands' Johannes de Jong, Belgium's Jozef-Ernest van Roey and France's Jules-Géraud Saliège issued major denunciations of Nazi treatment of Jews. Convents and nuns, among them Margit Slachta and Matylda Getter, also led resistance. Vatican diplomats such as Giuseppe Burzio in Slovakia, Filippo Bernardini in Switzerland and Angelo Roncalli in Turkey saved thousands. The nuncios to Budapest, Angelo Rotta, and to Bucharest, Andrea Cassulo, have been recognised by Yad Vashem in Israel.

== Background ==
In the 1920s and early 1930s, German bishops condemned Nazi ideology, warned Catholics against its racism, and in some dioceses banned membership of the Nazi Party. After the Nazis took power in 1933, they signed the Reich concordat with the Holy See, which guaranteed the Church's rights in Germany but barred clergy from taking part in politics. The regime quickly breached it and began a persecution of the Church, described in Nazi persecution of the Catholic Church in Germany.

The Catholic Church resisted the Holocaust by rejecting the racial ideology underpinning the mass exterminations; making public pronouncements against racial persecutions; and by lobbying officials, providing false documents, and hiding people in monasteries, convents, schools, among families and the institutions of the Vatican itself, leading many leading Jews to offer thanks to the Roman Church at the completion of the war. In every country under German occupation, priests played a major part in rescuing Jews. Catholic historian Michael Phayer wrote that "Rescuers and perpetrators were but a slight minority of Europe's Catholic population."

== Prelude ==
On 11 November 1938, following Kristallnacht, Pope Pius XI joined Western leaders in condemning the pogrom. In response, the Nazis organised mass demonstrations against Catholics and Jews in Munich, and the Bavarian Gauleiter Adolf Wagner declared before 5,000 protesters: "Every utterance the Pope makes in Rome is an incitement of the Jews throughout the world to agitate against Germany". On 21 November, in an address to the world's Catholics, the Pope rejected the Nazi claim of racial superiority, and insisted instead that there was only a single human race. Robert Ley, the Nazi Minister of Labour declared the following day in Vienna: "No compassion will be tolerated for the Jews. We deny the Pope's statement that there is but one human race. The Jews are parasites." Catholic leaders including Cardinal Schuster of Milan, Cardinal van Roey in Belgium and Cardinal Verdier in Paris backed the Pope's strong condemnation of Kristallnacht.

Unlike the Nazi euthanasia murder of invalids, which the church led protests against, the Final Solution liquidation of the Jews did not primarily take place on German soil, but rather in Polish territory. Awareness of the murderous campaign was therefore less widespread. Such protests as were made by the Catholic bishops in Germany regarding anti-Semitic policies of the regime, tended to be by way of private letters to government ministers. But the church had already rejected the racial ideology underpinning the Nazi Holocaust.

The Nazi Concentration Camps had been established in 1933, as political prisons, but it was not until the invasion of Russia that the death camps opened, and techniques learned in the aborted euthanasia program were transported to the East for the racial exterminations. The process of gassing commenced in December 1941. During the pontificate of Pope John Paul II, the Catholic Church reflected on the Holocaust in We Remember: A Reflection on the Shoah (1998). The document acknowledged a negative history of "long-standing sentiments of mistrust and hostility that we call anti-Judaism" from many Christians towards Jews, but distinguished these from the racial antisemitism of the Nazis:

[T]heories began to appear which denied the unity of the human race, affirming an original diversity of races. In the 20th century, National Socialism in Germany used these ideas as a pseudo-scientific basis for a distinction between so called Nordic-Aryan races and supposedly inferior races. Furthermore, an extremist form of nationalism was heightened in Germany by the defeat of 1918 and the demanding conditions imposed by the victors, with the consequence that many saw in National Socialism a solution to their country's problems and cooperated politically with this movement. The church in Germany replied by condemning racism.

— We Remember: A Reflection on the Shoah

== From the Papacy ==
In the 1930s, Pope Pius XI urged Mussolini to ask Hitler to restrain the anti-Semitic actions taking place in Germany. In 1937, he issued the Mit brennender Sorge (German: "With burning concern") encyclical, in which he asserted the inviolability of human rights. It was written partly in response to the Nuremberg Laws, and condemned racial theories and the mistreatment of people based on race. It repudiated Nazi racial theory and the "so-called myth of race and blood". It denounced "whoever exalts race, or the people, or the State ... above their standard value and divinizes them to an idolatrous level"; spoke of divine values independent of "space country and race" and a church for "all races"; and said "None but superficial minds could stumble into concepts of a national God, of a national religion; or attempt to lock within the frontiers of a single people, within the narrow limits of a single race, God, the Creator of the universe."

The document noted on the horizon the "threatening storm clouds" of religious wars of extermination over Germany.

Following the Anschluss and the extension of antisemitic laws in Germany, Jewish refugees sought sanctuary outside the Reich. In Rome, Pius XI told a group of Belgian pilgrims on 6 September 1938, "It is not possible for Christians to participate in anti-Semitism. Spiritually we are Semites." Following the November Kristallnacht of that year, Pius XI condemned the pogrom, sparking mass demonstrations against Catholics and Jews in Munich, where the Bavarian Gauleiter Adolf Wagner declared: "Every utterance the Pope makes in Rome is an incitement of the Jews throughout the world to agitate against Germany". The Vatican took steps to find refuge for Jews. On 21 November, in an address to the world's Catholics, Pius XI rejected the Nazi claim of racial superiority, and insisted instead that there was only a single human race.

Pius XI's Secretary of State, Cardinal Pacelli, made some 55 protests against Nazi policies, including its "ideology of race". Pacelli succeeded Pius XI on the eve of war in 1939. Taking the name Pius XII, he also employed diplomacy to aid the victims of Nazi persecution, and directed his church to provide discreet aid to Jews. His encyclicals such as Summi Pontificatus and Mystici corporis spoke against racism – with specific reference to Jews: "there is neither Gentile nor Jew, circumcision nor uncircumcision".

His Summi Pontificatus first papal encyclical followed the Nazi/Soviet invasion of Poland, and reiterated Catholic teaching against racism and anti-Semitism and affirmed the ethical principles of the "Revelation on Sinai". Pius reiterated church teaching on the "principle of equality" – with specific reference to Jews: "there is neither Gentile nor Jew, circumcision nor uncircumcision". The forgetting of solidarity "imposed by our common origin and by the equality of rational nature in all men" was called "pernicious error". Catholics everywhere were called upon to offer "compassion and help" to the victims of the war. The letter also decried the deaths of noncombatants. Local bishops were instructed to assist those in need. Pius went on to make a series of general condemnations of racism and genocide through the course of the war.

1942 Christmas address

After the invasion of the Soviet Union, Nazi Germany commenced its industrialised mass murder of the Jews, around late 1941/early 1942. At Christmas 1942, once evidence of the mass slaughter of the Jews had emerged, Pius XII voiced concern at the murder of "hundreds of thousands" of "faultless" people because of their "nationality or race" and intervened to attempt to block Nazi deportations of Jews in various countries. According to the Encyclopædia Britannica, he refused to say more "fearing that public papal denunciations might provoke the Hitler regime to brutalize further those subject to Nazi terror – as it had when Dutch bishops publicly protested earlier in the year – while jeopardizing the future of the church". Regardless, the Nazi authorities were distressed by the papal intervention. The Reich Security Main Office, responsible for the deportation of Jews, noted:

In a manner never known before, the Pope has repudiated the National Socialist New European Order ... Here he is virtually accusing the German people of injustice towards the Jews and makes himself the mouthpiece of the Jewish war criminals

Germany

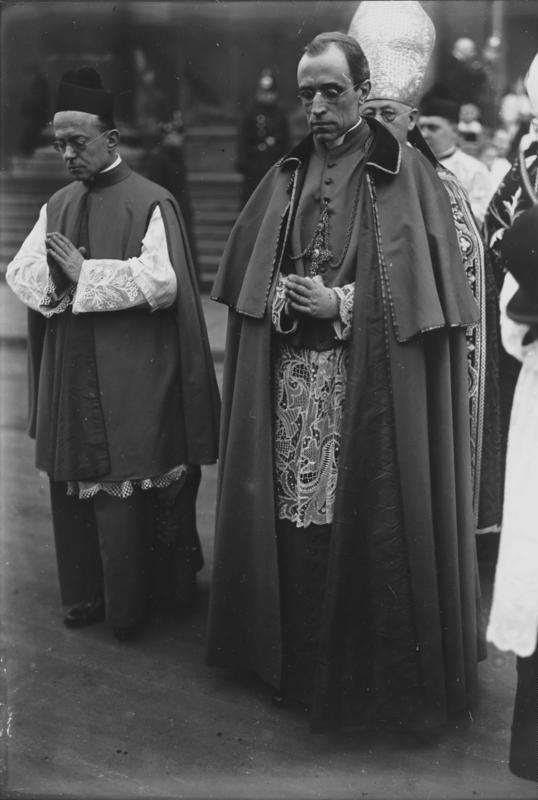
Eugenio Pacelli (later Pope Pius XII) served as Pius XI's diplomatic representative in Germany (1917–1929) and then as Vatican Secretary of State (1929–1939), during which period he delivered multiple denunciations of Nazi racial ideology.

Eugenio Pacelli (later Pope Pius XII) served as Pius XI's diplomatic representative in Germany (1917–1929) and then as Vatican Secretary of State (1929–1939), during which period he delivered multiple denunciations of Nazi racial ideology. As the newly installed Nazi Government began to instigate its program of anti-antisemitism, Pope Pius XI, through Cardinal Pacelli, who was by then serving as Vatican Secretary of State, ordered the successor Papal Nuncio in Berlin, Cesare Orsenigo, to "look into whether and how it may be possible to become involved" in their aid. Orsenigo generally proved a poor instrument in this regard, concerned more with the anti-church policies of the Nazis and how these might effect German Catholics, than with taking action to help German Jews. In the assessment of historian Michael Phayer, Orsenigo did intervene on behalf of the Jews, but only seldom, and apart from his attempt to halt a plan to "resettle" Jews married to Christians, when directed by the Holy See to protest against mistreatment of Jews, he did so "timidly".

Pacelli was among those who helped draft the 1937 papal anti-Nazi encyclical Mit brennender Sorge, repudiating Nazi racial theory and the "so-called myth of race and blood". Pacelli became Pope in 1939, and told Vatican officials that he intended to reserve the all-important handling of diplomacy with Germany for himself. He issued Summi Pontificatus which spoke of the equality of races, and of Jew and Gentile. Following a 21 June 1943 Vatican Radio broadcast to Germany which spoke in defence of Yugoslav Jews, Pius XII instructed the papal nuncio to Germany, Cesare Orsenigo to speak directly with Hitler about the persecution of the Jews. Orsenigo later met with Hitler at Berchtesgaden, but when the subject of the Jews was raised, Hitler reportedly turned his back, and smashed a glass on the floor.

=== In Italy ===
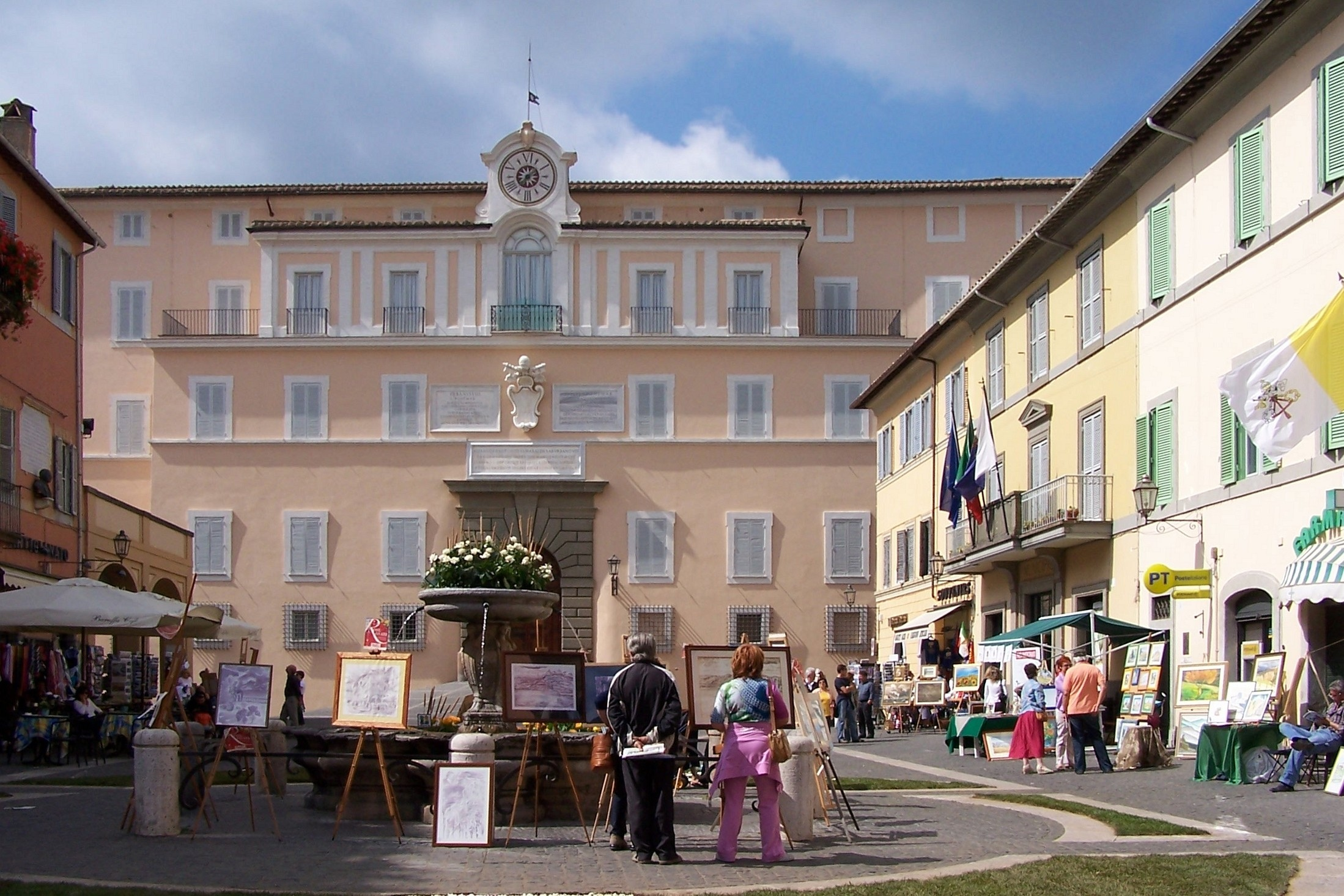
The Papal Palace of Castel Gandolfo, the Pope's summer residence, was thrown open to Jews fleeing the Nazi roundups in Northern Italy. In Rome, Pope Pius XII had ordered the city's Catholic institutions to open themselves to the Jews, and 4715 of the 5715 people listed for deportation by the Nazis were sheltered in 150 institutions.

In Italy, where the Pope's direct influence was strongest, the Pope ordered Catholic institutions to open themselves to the Jews when the Nazi roundups finally came to the country following Fascist Italy's capitulation and the subsequent invasion and occupation of Italy by Nazi German forces. Unlike in Germany, anti-Semitism was not a popular or pervasive concept in Italy, and anti-Semitism had not been a founding principle of Italian Fascism, although Mussolini's regime eventually moved closer to Hitler's with time following the Pact of Steel. On 27 June 1943, Vatican Radio is reported to have broadcast a papal injunction: "He who makes a distinction between Jews and other men is being unfaithful to God and is in conflict with God's commands" In July 1943, with the Allies advancing from the south, Mussolini was overthrown, and on 1 September, the new government agreed an armistice with the Allies. The Germans occupied much of the country, commencing an effort to deport the nation's Jews. The Pope had helped the Jews of Rome in September, by offering whatever amounts of gold might be needed towards the 50 kg ransom demanded by the Nazis.

According to Martin Gilbert, when the Nazis commenced the roundup of Roman Jews of 16 October, Pius had already "A few days earlier ... personally ordered the Vatican clergy to open the sanctuaries of the Vatican City to all "non-Aryans" in need of refuge. By morning of October 16, a total of 477 Jews had been given shelter in the Vatican and its enclaves, while another 4,238 had been given sanctuary in the many monasteries and convents of in Rome. Only 1,015 of Rome's 6,730 Jews were seized that morning". Upon receiving news of the roundups on the morning of 16 October, the Pope immediately instructed Cardinal Secretary of State, Cardinal Cardinal Maglione, to make a protest to the German Ambassador to the Vatican, Ernst von Weizsacker. "Maglione did so that morning, making it clear to the ambassador that the deportation of Jews was offensive to the Pope. In urging Weizsacker 'to try to save these innocent people,' Maglione added: 'It is sad for the Holy Father, sad beyond imagination, that here in Rome, under the very eyes of the Common Father, that so many people should suffer only because they belong to a specific race.'" Following the meeting, Weizsacker gave orders for a halt to the arrests. That same day, the Vatican secured the release of 252 children.

As German round-ups continued in Northern Italy, the Pope opened his summer residence, Castel Gandolfo, to take in thousands of Jews and authorised institutions across the north to do the same.

Pius assisted various noted rescuers. From within the Vatican, and in co-operation with Pius XII, Monsignor Hugh O'Flaherty, operated an escape operation for Jews and Allied escapees. In 2012, the Irish Independent Newspaper credited O'Flaherty with having saved more than 6,500 people during the war. Pietro Palazzini was an assistant vice rector in a pontifical seminary during the war, and is remembered by Israel for his efforts for Italian Jews during the war. He hid Michael Tagliacozzo on Vatican property in 1943 and 1944, when the Nazis were rounding up Italian Jews and was recognised by Yad Vashem in 1985. Giovanni Ferrofino is credited with saving 10,000 Jews. Acting on secret orders from Pope Pius XII, Ferrofino obtained visas from the Portuguese Government and the Dominican Republic to secure their escape from Europe and sanctuary in the Americas. Pius provided funds to the Jewish refugees saved by French Capuchin Pierre-Marie Benoit of Marseille and others. When Archbishop Archbishop Giovanni Montini (later Pope Paul VI) was offered an award for his rescue work by Israel, he said he had only been acting on the orders of Pius XII.

=== Vatican diplomatic corps ===
Pius XII allowed the national hierarchies of the church to assess and respond to their local situation under Nazi rule, but himself established the Vatican Information Service to provide aid to, and information about, war refugees. He gave his blessing to the establishment of safe houses inside the Vatican and in monasteries and convents across Europe and oversaw a secret operation for priests to shelter Jews by means of fake documents – with some Jews made Vatican subjects to spare them from the Nazis. On papal instructions, 4,000 Jews were hidden in Italian monasteries and convents, and 2,000 Hungarian Jews given fake documents identifying them as Catholics.

Vatican neutrality through the war permitted the Holy See's network of diplomats to continue to operate throughout the occupied territories of the Nazi Empire, enabling the dissemination of intelligence back to Rome, and diplomatic interventions on behalf of the victims of the conflict. Pius' diplomatic representatives lobbied on behalf of Jews across Europe, including in Nazi allied Vichy France, Hungary, Romania, Bulgaria, Croatia and Slovakia, Germany itself and elsewhere. Many papal nuncios played important roles in the rescue of Jews, among them Giuseppe Burzio, the Vatican Chargé d'Affaires in Slovakia, Filippo Bernardini, Nuncio to Switzerland and Angelo Roncalli, the nuncio to Turkey.

Angelo Rotta, the wartime Papal Nuncio to Budapest and Andrea Cassulo, the Papal Nuncio to Bucharest have been recognised as Righteous Among the Nations by Yad Vashem, Israel's Holocaust Martyrs' and Heroes' Remembrance Authority.

Bulgaria

Bulgaria signed a pact with Hitler in 1941 and reluctantly joined the Axis powers. Mgr Angelo Roncalli – then Papal Nuncio in Turkey, later Pope John XXIII – was among those who lobbied King Boris for the protection of Jewish families. The King effectively thwarted Hitler's plans for the extermination of Bulgaria's Jews, and at war's end, Bulgaria had a larger Jewish population than it had had at the outset.

In 1943, Pius instructed his Bulgarian representative to take "all necessary steps" to support Bulgarian Jews facing deportation and his Turkish nuncio Angelo Roncalli arranged for the transfer of thousands of children out of Bulgaria to Palestine. The Bulgarian Orthodox Church lobbied firmly against the deportations of Jews, and in March 1943, the King rescinded the order to deport them, and released Jews already in custody – an event known in Bulgaria as the "miracle of the Jewish people".

Romania

Andrea Cassulo served as Papal nuncio in Romania during the period of World War II. While the country was never occupied by Nazi Germany, the regime of Marshall Ion Antonescu aligned itself with Hitler, and assisted the Nazi Holocaust. In his study of the rescuers of Jews, Gilbert wrote that, Cassulo "appealed directly to Marshall Antonescu to limit the deportations [of Jews to Nazi concentration camps] planned for the summer of 1942. His appeal was ignored; hundreds of thousands of Romanian Jews were transported to Transnistria."

Angelo Roncalli advised the Pope of Jewish concentration camps in Romanian occupied Transnistria. The Pope protested to the Romanian government and authorised for funds to be sent to the camps. In 1944, the Chief Rabbi of Bucharest praised the work of Cassulo and the Pope on behalf of Romania's Jews: "the generous assistance of the Holy See ... was decisive and salutary. It is not easy for us to find the right words to express the warmth and consolation we experienced because of the concern of the supreme Pontiff, who offered a large sum to relieve the sufferings of deported Jews – sufferings which had been pointed out to him by you after your visit to Transnistria. The Jews of Romania will never forget these facts of historic importance." Cassulo has been honoured as Righteous among the Nations by Yad Vashem.

Hungary

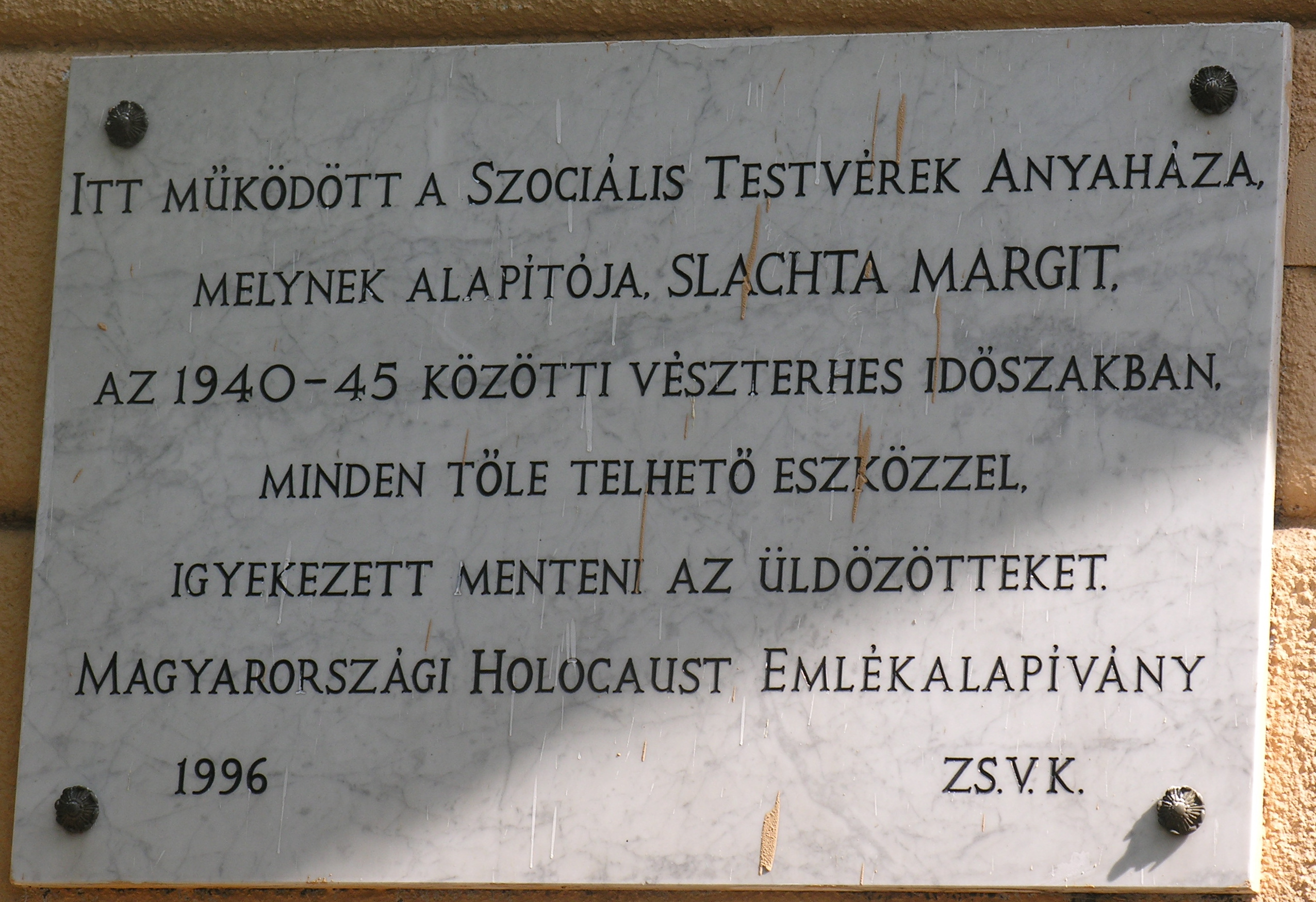
Memorial to Margit Slachta of the Sisters of Social Service

The Hungarian Regent, Admiral Horthy, though allied to Hitler, did not adopt Nazi racial ideology, and Hungarian Jews were not subject to deportations to death camps through 1942–3. Margit Slachta of the Sisters of Social Service responded immediately to reports in 1940 of early displacement of Jews. When in 1941, 20,000 Jewish labourers were deported, Slachta protested to the wife of Admiral Horthy. In 1943, Slachta went to Rome to encourage papal action against the Jewish persecutions. In Hungary, she had sheltered the persecuted and protested forced labor and anti-semitism.

Angelo Rotta, Papal Nuncio from 1930, actively protested Hungary's mistreatment of the Jews, and helped persuade Pope Pius XII to lobby the Hungarian leader Admiral Horthy to stop their deportation. In 1944 Pius made a direct intervention in Hungary to lobby for an end to Jewish deportations in 1944. On 4 July, Horthy told Berlin's representative that deportations of Jews must cease, citing protests by the Vatican, the King of Sweden and the Red Cross for his decision.

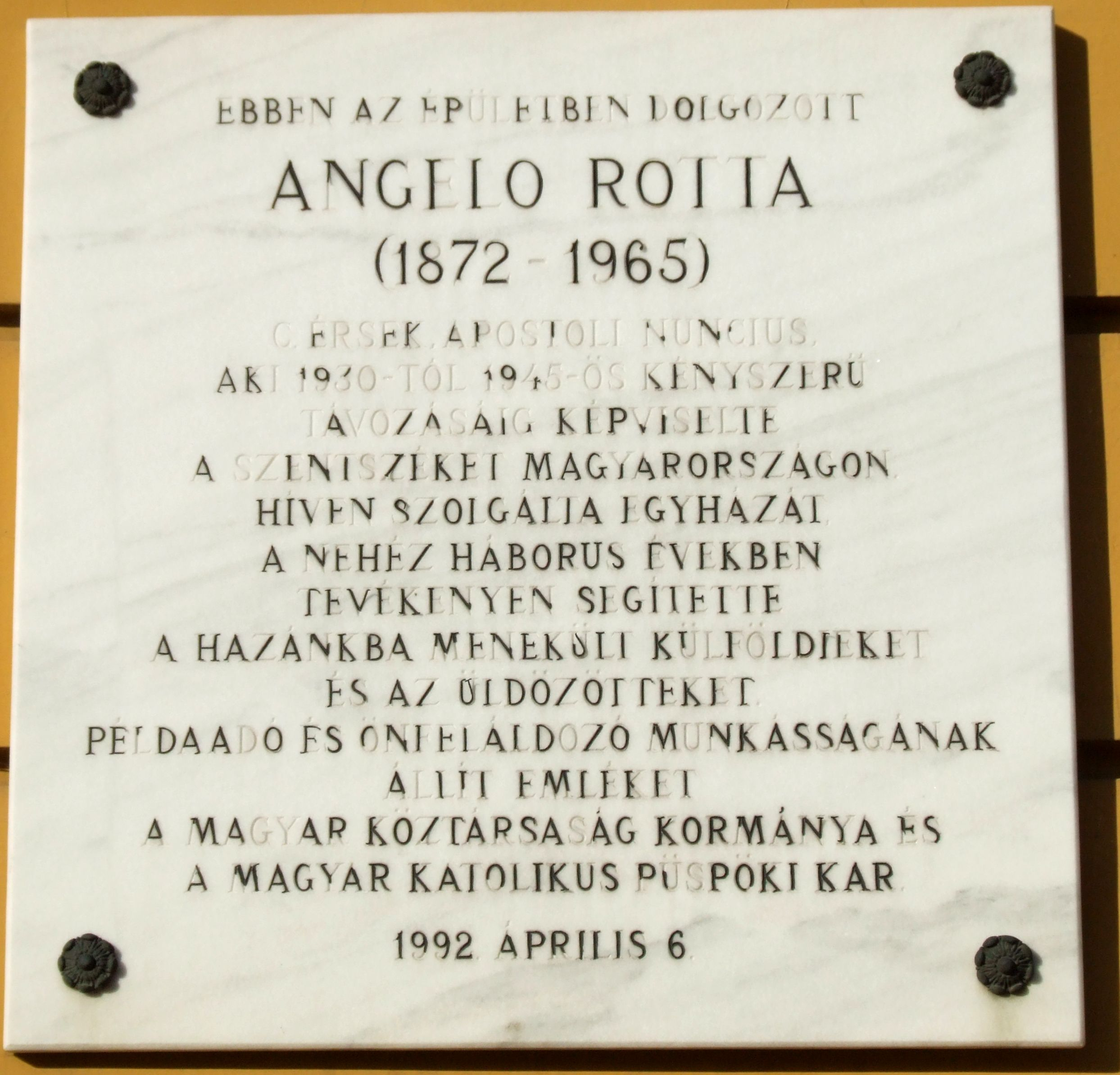
Memorial plaque to Papal Nuncio to Hungary, Angelo Rotta, honored as a Righteous Gentile

The Nazis occupied Hungary in 1944, and commenced widescale deportations of Jews. The process began with Jews sent to Ghettos, and though local leaders of the Catholic, Protestant Reform Churches tried to help the Jews, Jews from all across Hungary outside of Budapest were deported to Auschwitz. As rumor spread of the murder of the deportees, the Hungarian Ministry for the Interior criticised clergymen for issuing fake baptismal certificates. By June 1944, the neutral powers in Budapest were issuing protective visas. Rotta received approval from the Vatican to begin issuing protective passes to Jewish converts and was eventually able to distribute more than 15,000 such protective passes, while instructing the drafters of the documents not to examine the recipients credentials too closely.

The pro-Nazi, anti-Semitic Arrow Cross seized power in October, and a campaign of murder of the Jews commenced. A Red Cross official asked Rotta for pre-signed blank identity papers, to offer to the sick and needy fleeing the Arrow Cross, and was given the documents, along with Rotta's blessing. Like the celebrated Swedish diplomat Raoul Wallenberg, Rotta became a leader of diplomatic actions to protect Hungarian Jews.

Rotta encouraged Hungarian church leaders to help their "Jewish brothers", and directed Fr Tibor Baranszky to go to the forced marches and distribute letters of immunity to as many Jews as he could. Baranszky, was executive secretary of the Jewish Protection Movement of the Holy See in Hungary, and was also honoured by Yad Vashem as a Righteous Gentil for saving over 3,000 Jewish lives, acting on the orders of Pope Pius XII.

Rotta, led a citywide rescue scheme in Budapest. According to Martin Gilbert, "With Arrow Cross members killing Jews in the streets of Budapest, Angelo Rotta, the senior Vatican representative in Budapest, took a lead in establishing an "International Ghetto", consisting of several dozen modern apartment buildings to which large numbers of Jews – eventually 25,000 – were brought and to which the Swiss, Swedish, Portuguese, and Spanish legations, as well as the Vatican, affixed their emblems."

On 15 November, the Hungarian Government established the "Big Ghetto" for 69,000, while a further 30,000 with protective documents went to the International Ghetto. On 19 November 1944, the Vatican joined the four other neutral powers – Sweden, Spain, Portugal and Switzerland – in a further collective protest to the Hungarian Government calling for the suspension of deportations. The government complied, and banned the "death marches" – but Budapest was by that stage near anarchy, and deportations continued from 21 November. The Arrow Cross continued their orgy of violence, raiding the international Ghetto and murdering Jews, as Soviet forces approached the city. Rotta and Wallenberg were among the few diplomats to remain in Budapest. Following the Soviet conquest of the city, Wallenberg was seized by the Russians and taken to Moscow, from where he was never released. Gilbert wrote that of the hundred and fifty thousand Jews who had been in Budapest when the Germans arrived in March 1944, almost 120,000 survived to liberation – 69,000 from the Big Ghetto, 25,000 in the International Ghetto and a further 25,000 hiding out in Christian homes and religious institutes across the city.

Leading church figures involved in the 1944 rescue of Hungarian Jews included Bishops Vilmos Apor, Endre Hamvas and Áron Márton. Primate József Mindszenty issued public and private protests and was arrested on 27 October 1944.

The Jews of the Hungarian provinces were decimated by the Nazis and their Fascist Hungarian allies, but many of the Jews of Budapest were saved by the extraordinary efforts of the diplomatic corps.

Local church men and women were also prominent in rescue efforts. Jesuit Prior Jakab Raile is credited with saving around 150 in the Jesuit residence of the city. Margit Slachta told her Sisters of Social Service that the precepts of their faith demanded that they protect the Jews, even if it led to their own deaths. Following the Nazi occupation, Slachta's sisters arranged baptisms in the hope it would spare people from deportation, sent food and supplies to the Jewish ghettos, and sheltered people in their convents. One of the sisters, Sára Salkaházi, was among those captured sheltering the Jews, and executed. Slachta herself was beaten and only narrowly avoided execution. The sisters are credited with rescuing at least 1000 Hungarian Jews.

In his study of the rescuers of the Jews, Martin Gilbert recounts that the monks of the Champagnat Institute of the Order of Mary in Budapest took in 100 children and 50 parents as boarders. Discovered, the Jews were killed, and six monks tortured, but released. Similar numbers were protected and then discovered in the convents of the Sisters of the Divine Saviour and the Order of the Divine Love, with many of the Jews dragged out and murdered by the Arrow Cross. The prioress of the Sisters of the Eucharistic Union was captured and tortured for sheltering Jews in her hospital. Despite warnings, she resumed her rescue efforts in the apartment of the Prelate Arnold Pataky. Hundreds more Jews were saved at the Convent of the Good Shepherd, the home of the Sisters of Mercy of Szatmar and the Convent of Sacre Coeur.

Assessments of Pius XII

Upon the death of Pius XII in 1958, the Israeli Foreign Minister Golda Meir said: "When fearful martyrdom came to our people in the decade of Nazi terror, the voice of the Pope was raised for the victims. The life of our times was enriched by a voice speaking out on the great moral truths above the tumult of daily conflict. We mourn a great servant of peace." Leading historian of the Holocaust, Sir Martin Gilbert, has said that Pope Pius XII should be declared a "righteous gentile" by Yad Vashem. But his insistence on Vatican neutrality and avoidance of naming the Nazis as the evildoers of the conflict became the foundation for contemporary and later criticisms from some quarters. Hitler biographer John Toland, while scathing of Pius' cautious public comments in relation to the mistreatment of Jews, concluded that nevertheless, "The Church, under the Pope's guidance, had already saved the lives of more Jews than all other churches, religious institutions and rescue organizations combined ...". Assessing Pius' role as a protector of Jews during the war, David Klinghoffer wrote for the Jewish Journal in 2005 that "I'm not sure it's true, as Dalin argues, that Pius saved more Jews than any other Righteous Gentile in World War II. But it seems fairly certain that he was, overall, a strenuous defender of Jews who saved tens of thousands, maybe hundreds of thousands. While 80 percent of European Jews were murdered in the Holocaust, 85 percent of Italian Jews survived, thanks in large part to the Vatican's efforts."

Susan Zuccotti has written that the Vatican was aware of the creation of the Nazi extermination camps, and that she believed that with an "open condemnation of racism and the persecutions (of Jews)" by the church, "other results could have been achieved." With regard to the work done by the Vatican, "much more was requested by many," indeed, "much more was hoped for by the Jews."

== Episcopal protests ==
=== The Netherlands ===
On 11 July 1942, the Dutch bishops, joined all Christian denominations in sending a letter to the Nazi General Friedrich Christiansen in protest against the treatment of Jews. The letter was read in all Catholic churches against German opposition. It brought attention to mistreatment of Jews and asked all Christians to pray for them:

Ours is a time of great tribulations of which two are foremost: the sad destiny of the Jews and the plight of those deported for forced labor. ... All of us must be aware of the terrible sufferings which both of them have to undergo, due to no guilt of their own. We have learned with deep pain of the new dispositions which impose upon innocent Jewish men, women and children the deportation into foreign lands. ... The incredible suffering which these measures cause to more than 10,000 people is in absolute opposition to the divine precepts of justice and charity. ... Let us pray to God and for the intercession of Mary ... that he may lend his strength to the people of Israel, so severely tried in anguish and persecution.

— Protest of the Dutch Bishops, 1942

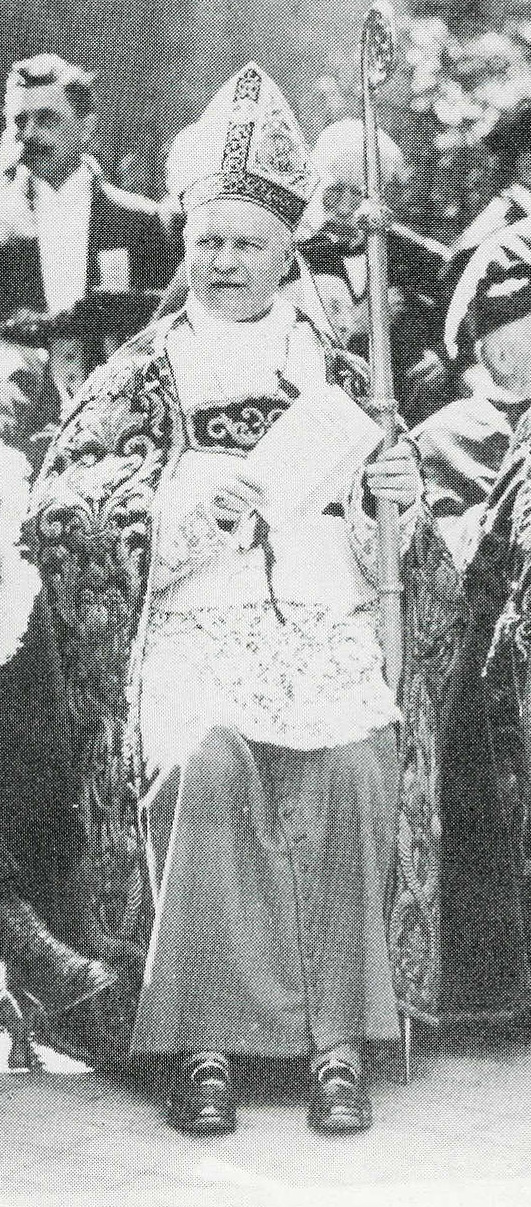
Cardinal Jozef-Ernest van Roey, head of the church in Belgium, was active in rescuing Jews.

The joint Catholic-Protestant letter objected to the murder of baptised and non-baptised Jews alike. The protest angered the Nazi authorities and deportations of Jews only increased Many Catholics were involved in strikes and protests against the treatment of Jews, and the Nazis offered to exempt converts and Jews married to non-Jews if protests ceased. When Archbishop Johannes de Jong refused to relent to Nazi threats, the Gestapo rounded up all the Catholic-Jews they could find. 92 were sent Auschwitz. Among the Catholics of the Netherlands abducted in this way was Edith Stein who was murdered at Auschwitz.

During the Nazi Occupation of the Netherlands, when Jewish deportations began, many were hidden in Catholic areas. Parish priests created networks for hiding Jews and close knit country parishes were able to hide Jews without being informed upon by neighbours, as occurred in the cities. Gilbert wrote, "as in every country under German occupation, so in Holland, local priests played a major part in rescuing Jews". Some 40,000 Jews were hidden by the Dutch church and 49 priests killed in the process.

=== Belgium ===
Belgium's senior cleric, Cardinal van Roey, had backed Pope Pius XI's strong condemnation of the Kristallnacht pogrom of 1938. Van Roey intervened with the authorities to rescue Jews, and encouraged various institutions to aid Jewish children. On 24 September 1942, he joined Queen Mother Elizabeth in protesting the arrest of six leading Jews and secured the release of five of the men. Léon Platteau of the Interior Ministry also made a stance to protect Jews.

Cardinal van Roey encouraged various institutions to aid Jewish children. One of his acts of rescue was to open a geriatric centre in which Jews were housed, at which kosher Jewish cooks would be required who could therefore be given special passes protecting them from deportation.

=== Vichy France ===
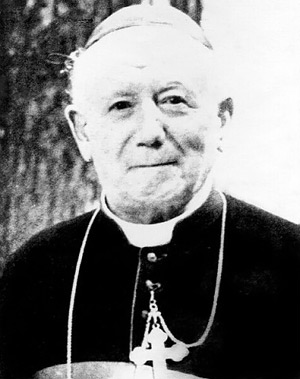
The Archbishop of Toulouse, Jules-Géraud Saliège led a powerful denunciation of the mistreatment of Jews in 1942.

When round-ups of foreign Jews in France first commenced, the French Catholic bishops, and the leading representative of French Jewry alike, took little action. The largely conservative French hierarchy was initially broadly sympathetic to the Vichy Government. A meeting of the Cardinals and Bishops of 21 July 1942, resulted in a letter to Marshall Petain calling for better treatment of internees. But when the authorities began to round-up French Jews, attitudes changed. And when the Nazis pressured the Vichy Regime to reclassify French Jews as "foreigners", the bishops declared their opposition.

Bishops began to speak out and some encouraged secret rescue efforts of Jews, especially of Jewish children. With the free press silenced, Charles Lederman, a Jewish Communist approached the Archbishop of Toulouse, Jules-Géraud Saliège, to alert public opinion to what was being done to the Jews. He told Saliège of the arrests, kidnappings and deportations. On 30 August 1942, Saliège wrote a famous pastoral letter, declaring that Jews were humans, who should not be loaded on trucks like cattle. He told his parishioners: "The Jews are real men and women. Not everything is permitted against these men and women, against these fathers and mothers. They are part of the human species. They are our brothers like so many others. A Christian should not forget this".

Other bishops – Monseigneur Théas, Bishop of Montauban, Monseigneur Delay, Bishop of Marseilles, Cardinal Gerlier, Archbishop of Lyon, Monseigneur Edmund Vansteenberghe of Bayonne and Monseigneur Jean Moussaron, Archbishop of Albi – also denounced the roundups from the pulpit and through parish distributions, in defiance of the Vichy regime. With the Nazi Empire around its full extent in late 1942, the Nazis sought to extend their roundups of Jews, and resistance began to spread. In Lyon, Cardinal Gerlier had defiantly refused to hand over Jewish children being sheltered in Catholic homes, and on 9 September, it was reported in London that Vichy French authorities had ordered the arrest of all Catholic priests sheltering Jews in the unoccupied zone. Eight Jesuits were arrested for sheltering hundreds of children on Jesuit properties, and Pius XII's Secretary of State, Cardinal Maglione informed the Vichy Ambassador to the Vatican that "the conduct of the Vichy government towards Jews and foreign refugees was a gross infraction" of the Vichy government's own principles, and "irreconcilable with the religious feelings which Marshal Petain had so often invoked in his speeches".

The protest of the bishops is seen by various historians as a turning point in the formerly passive response of the Catholic Church in France. Marie-Rose Gineste transported a pastoral letter from Bishop Théas of Montauban by bicycle to forty parishes, denouncing the uprooting of men and women "treated as wild animals", and the French Resistance smuggled the text to London, where it was broadcast to France by the BBC, reaching tens of thousands of homes. The protests encouraged other clerics like the Capuchin priest Père Marie-Benoît, who saved many Jews in Marseille and later in Rome where he became known among the Jewish community as "father of the Jews".

=== Croatia ===
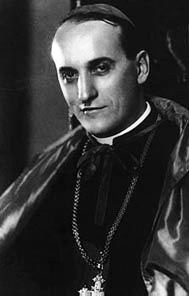
Archbishop Aloysius Stepinac of Zagreb initially welcomed the Independent State of Croatia granted by Nazi Germany, but subsequently condemned the Nazi-aligned state's atrocities against Jews and Serbs.

After the 1941 invasion of Yugoslavia, a puppet state was created in Croatia. In the spring of 1942, following a meeting with Pius XII in Rome, Stepinac declared publicly that it was "forbidden to exterminate Gypsies and Jews because they are said to belong to an inferior race". In July and October 1943, Stepinac denounced race murders in the most explicit terms, and had his denunciation read from pulpits across Croatia. Nazi envoy Siegfried Kasche advised Berlin that Italian forces were not willing to hand over Jews and had "apparently been influenced" by Vatican opposition to German anti-Semitism, and no Jews were deported from Italy prior to the 1943 Nazi occupation.

When Himmler visited Zagreb a year later, indicating the impending roundup of remaining Jews, Stepinac wrote Pavelić that if this occurred, he would protest for "the Catholic Church is not afraid of any secular power, whatever it may be, when it has to protect basic human values". When deportatation began, Stepinac and Marcone protested to Andrija Artukovic. According to Phayer, the Vatican ordered Stepinac to save as many Jews as possible during the upcoming roundup. In July and October 1943, Stepinac condemned race murders in the most explicit terms, and had his condemnation read from pulpits across Croatia. The Germans took this to be a denunciation of the murder of both Serbs and Jews, and arrested 31 priests. Phayer wrote that, despite knowing that he would be a target of Communists if the Croat regime fell, "no leader of a national church ever spoke as pointedly about genocide as did Stepinac". Though Stepinac personally saved many potential victims, his protests had little effect on Pavelić.

The Vatican used Benedictine abbot, Giuseppe Marcone, its apostolic visitor, together with Archbishop Aloysius Stepinac of Zagreb – to pressure the Pavelić regime to cease its facilitation of race murders. Martin Gilbert wrote that "In the Croatian capital of Zagreb, as a result of intervention by [Marcone] on behalf of Jewish partners in mixed marriages, a thousand Croat Jews survived the war", while "Stepinac, who in 1941 had welcomed Croat independence, subsequently condemned Croat atrocities against both Serbs and Jews, and himself saved a group of Jews in an old age home". Stepinac tried to wield influence upon the regime and had modest success in preventing atrocities. Many of the other bishops, like Saric of Sarajevo and Aksamovic of Djakovo, eagerly collaborated with the regime and were openly antisemitic.

The Apostolic delegate to Turkey, Angelo Roncalli, saved a number of Croatian Jews – as well as Bulgarian and Hungarian Jews – by assisting their migration to Palestine. Roncalli succeeded Pius XII as Pope John XXIII, and always said that he had been acting on the orders of Pius XII in his actions to rescue Jews.

=== Slovakia ===
Slovakia was a new rump state formed by Hitler when Germany annexed the western half of Czechoslovakia. Hitler was able to exploit Czechoslovakia's ethnic diversity—in particular the presence of the German-speaking Sudetenlanders, and the independent minded Slovaks. The Fascist Slovak Republic became a nominally independent Nazi puppet with Joseph Tiso, a Catholic priest, as president. The Vatican began to worry that this Tiso's government was taking legislative stands contrary to Catholic principles. Between April and October 1942, some 60,000 Jews were deported to their deaths in Auschwitz and Majdanek, and the Catholic-dominated government of Slovakia did little to stop the deportations.

Pius XII protested to the Bratislava government the deportations of Slovak Jews from 1942. Giuseppe Burzio, the Apostolic Delegate to Bratislava, protested the anti-Semitic and totalitarianism of the Tiso regime. Burzio advised Rome of the deteriorating situation for Jews in the Nazi puppet state, sparking Vatican protests on behalf of Jews. Burzio also lobbied the Slovak government directly. In 1942 Burzio and others reported to Tiso that the Germans were murdering Slovakia's deported Jews. Tiso hesitated and then refused to deport Slovakia's 24,000 remaining Jews. When the transportation began again in 1943 Burzio challenged Prime Minister Tuka over the extermination of Slovak Jews. The Vatican condemned the renewal of the deportations on 5 May and the Slovak episcopate issued a pastoral letter condemning totalitarianism and anti-Semitism on 8 May 1943. Pius protested that "The Holy See would fail in its Divine Mandate if it did not deplore these measures, which gravely damage man in his natural right, mainly for the reason that these people belong to a certain race."

In August 1944, the Slovak National Uprising rose against the People's Party regime. German troops were sent to quell the rebellion and with them came security police charged with rounding up Slovakia's remaining Jews. Burzio begged Tiso directly to at least spare Catholic Jews from transportation and delivered an admonition from the Pope: "the injustice wrought by his government is harmful to the prestige of his country and enemies will exploit it to discredit clergy and the Church the world over."

Angelo Roncalli, the future Pope John XXIII, saved thousands of Slovak Jews by signing visas for immigration to Palestine, crediting this work to the orders of Pope Pius XII.

Bishop Pavel Gojdic protested the persecution of Slovak Jews. Gojdic was beatified by Pope John Paul II in 2001 and recognised as Righteous Among the Nations by Yad Vashem in 2007.

== Catholic networks ==
Direct action by Catholic institutions saved hundreds of thousands of Jews during the Nazi Holocaust. Priests and nuns of orders like the Jesuits, Franciscans and Benedictines hid children in monasteries, convents and schools. In Poland, the unique Zegota organisation rescued thousands, while in France, Belgium, and Italy, underground networks run by Catholic clergy and lay people were particularly active and saved thousands of Jews – particularly in southern France, and in northern Italy.

=== Belgium ===
Dislike of Germans and Nazism was strong in Belgium, and self-help by Jews was well organised. Following the occupation of Belgium, the Belgian Catholic Church played an important role in the defence of Jews. The Belgian Resistance viewed the defence of Jews as a central part of its activities. The Comité de Défense des Juifs (CDJ) was formed to work for the defence of Jews in the summer of 1942, and of its eight founding members, seven were Jewish and one, Emile Hambresin was Catholic. Some of their rescue operations were overseen by the priests Joseph André and Dom Bruno. Among other institutions, the CDJ enlisted the help of monasteries and religious schools and hospitals. Yvonne Nèvejean of the Oeuvre Nationale de l'Enfance greatly assisted with the hiding of Jewish children. According to Gilbert, over four and a half thousands Jewish children were given refuge in Christian families, convents, boarding schools, orphanages and sanatoriums because of the efforts of Nèvejean.

Benedictine monk, Dom Bruno (Henri Reynders) developed a disdain for Nazi anti-Semitism when exposed to it on a 1938 visit to Germany. He was captured as a prisoner of war while serving as an army chaplain in 1940, and in 1942 was sent by the head of the Benedictines to a Home for the Blind, operating as a front for hiding Jews. From small beginnings assisting families, assisted by Albert Van den Berg Dom Bruno's rescue efforts grew, dispersing hundreds. Van den Berg secured refuge for the Grand Rabbi of Liege and his elderly parents at the Capuchin Banneux home, cared for by monks. Bruno rejoined the Belgian Army as a chaplain after Liberation. He was active with the Belgian Resistance and organised escape routes for downed allied pilots and for Belgian Jews. Jews were hidden in monasteries, schools and the homes of Catholics at Dom Bruno's request. He was declared Righteous Among the Nations by Israel in 1964. He is credited with finding refuge for 320 Jewish children.

Joseph Andre of Namur found shelter for around 100 children in convents, returning them to Jewish community leaders after the war. Andre was very active in the rescue of Jews, handing over his own bed to Jewish refugees, and finding families to hide them, and distributing food as well as communications between families. He is credit with saving some 200 lives, and was forced into hiding in the final stages of the war.

Hubert Célis of Halmaal was arrested for harbouring Jewish children, but was released after confronting his interrogator with the following words: "You are a Catholic, and have forgotten that the Virgin was a Jewess, that Christ was Jewish, that He commanded us to love and help one another ... That He told us: 'I have given you an example so that you do as I have done' ... You are a Catholic, and you do not understand what a priest is! You do not understand that a priest does not betray!".

Many Belgian convents and monasteries sheltered Jewish children, pretending that they were Christian – among them the Franciscan Sisters in Bruges, the Sisters of Don Bosco in Courtrai, the Sisters of St Mary near Brussels, the Dominican Sisters at Lubbeek and others. About 3000 Jews were hidden in Belgian convents during the Nazi occupation.48 Belgian nuns have been honoured as Righteous among the Nations. Others so honoured include the Superior General of the Jesuits, Jean-Baptiste Janssens.

Baltic states

In Lithuania, priests were active in the rescue of Jews, among them Dambrauskas of Alsedziai (who acted against the wishes of his bishop), the Jesuit Bronius Paukstis, Lapis from Siauliai and Jonas Gylys of Varena, who delivered sermons against the murder of Jews, and sought to comfort Jews marked for murder.

In Scandinavia, the Catholic presence was small, but here the Christian Churches firmly opposed the deportations of Jews – Church of Norway bishops gave stern warnings, and the Danish Churches published strong protests and urged their congregations to assist Jews. A unique operation in Denmark saw almost all of Denmark's Jews smuggled into Sweden and safety.

=== Poland and the Zegota Council to Aid Jews ===
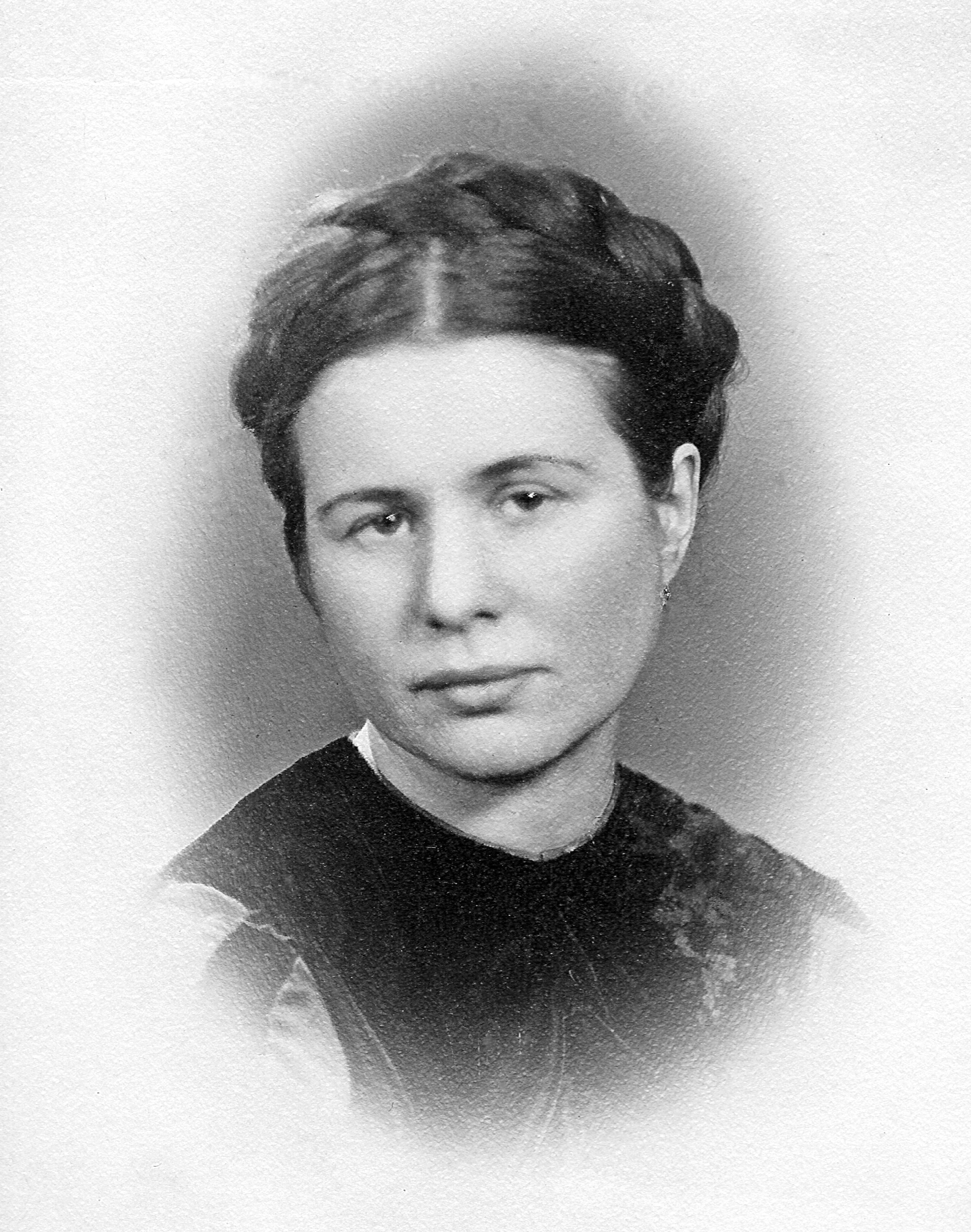
Irena Sendlerowa headed the children's section of Żegota, the council to Aid Jews, founded by Catholic activists.

Poland had a large Jewish population, and according to Davies, more Jews were both killed and rescued in Poland, than in any other nation: the rescue figure usually being put at between 100,000 and 150,000. The memorial at Belzec death camp commemorates 600,000 murdered Jews, and 1500 Poles who tried to save Jews. Thousands in Catholic Poland have been honoured as Righteous Among the Nations by Yad Vashem – constituting the largest national contingent. Hundreds of clergymen and nuns were involved in aiding Poland's Jews during the war, though precise numbers are difficult to confirm. From 1941, such aid carried the death penalty. Martin Gilbert wrote that many Poles betrayed Jews to the Germans, and that "Poles who risked their own lives to save the Jews were indeed the exception. But they could be found throughout Poland, in every town and village." Gilbert notes that, in relation to the development of Poland's Jewish rescue networks, Yisrael Gutman wrote that "One particular sector of the intelligentsia – comprising both men of progressive views and devout Catholics who worked with unrelenting devotion to rescue Jews – was of singular importance" and from these circles grew Zegota, the Council for the Assistance to the Jews.

A number of Bishops provided aid to Polish Jews, notably Karol Niemira, the Bishop of Pinsk, who cooperated with the underground organization maintaining ties with the Jewish ghetto and sheltered Jews in the Archbishop's residence. Oskar Schindler, a German Catholic businessman came to Poland, initially to profit from the German invasion. He went on to save many Jews, as dramatised in the film Schindler's List. Gilbert notes various Polish nuns honoured by Yad Vashem for sheltering Jews in their convents, and of the work of Polish priests in supplying fake baptismal certificates, of the work of parish priests like one of Nowt Dyor, who was tortured and beaten to death for protecting a Jewish girl, and Marceli Godlewski, who opened his crypt to Jews escaping the Ghetto. In Kolonia Wilenska, Anna Borkowska hid men from the Jewish underground from the Vilna ghetto.

The Jews of Warsaw, who prior to the war numbered some half a million people, were forced into the Warsaw Ghetto in 1940. By November 1941, the Nazi governor of the city had decreed that the death penalty would be applied with utmost severity to those sheltering or aiding Jews in any way. Matylda Getter, mother superior of the Franciscan Sisters of the Family of Mary took the decision to offer shelter to any Jewish children who could escape the Ghetto. Getter's convent was located at the entrance to the Ghetto. When the Nazis commenced the clearing of the Ghetto in 1941, Getter took in many orphans and dispersed them among Family of Mary homes. As the Nazis began sending orphans to the gas chambers, Getter issued fake baptismal certificates, providing the children with false identities. Living in daily fear of the Germans, the Family of Mary rescued more than 750 Jews.

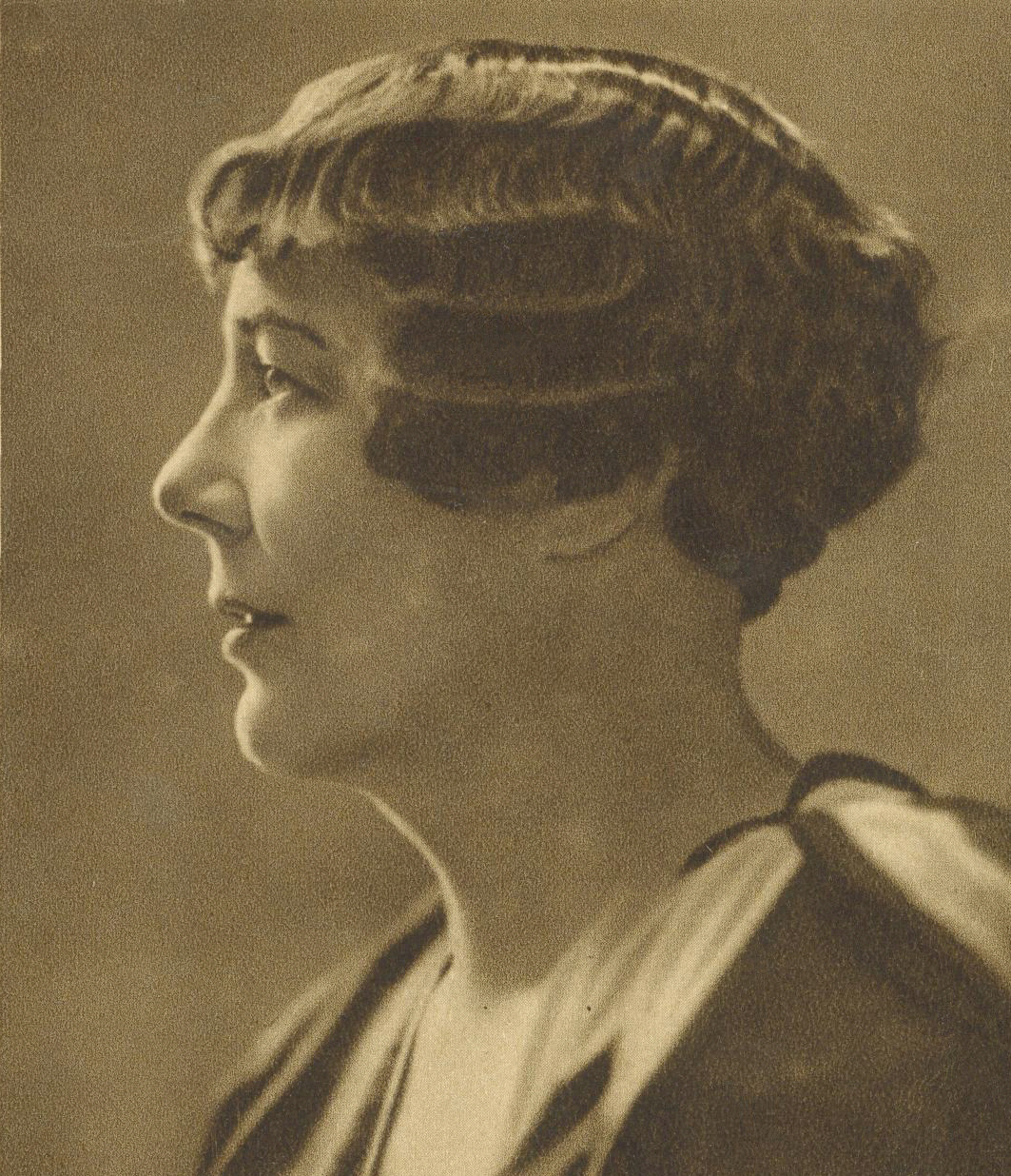
Zofia Kossak-Szczucka, co-founder of Zegota

When AK Home Army Intelligence discovered the true fate of transports leaving the Jewish Ghetto, the council to Aid Jews – Rada Pomocy Żydom (codename Zegota) was established in late 1942, in co-operation with church groups. The organisation saved thousands. Emphasis was placed on protecting children, as it was near impossible to intervene directly against the heavily guarded transports. False papers were prepared, and children were distributed among safe houses and church networks. Jewish children were often placed in church orphanages and convents. Poland was the only country in occupied Europe where such an organisation was established. Zegota was instigated by the writer Zofia Kossak-Szczucka and Catholic democrat activists. Two women founded the movement, the Catholic writer and activist, Zofia Kossak-Szczucka, and the socialist Wanda Filipowicz. Some of its members have been involved in Polish nationalist movements who were themselves anti-Jewish, but who were appalled by the barbarity of the Nazi mass murders. In an emotive protest prior to the foundation of the council, Kossak wrote that Hitler's race murders were a crime of which it was not possible to remain silent. While Polish Catholics might still feel Jews were "enemies of Poland", Kossak wrote that protest was required:

God requires this protest from us, God who does not allow murder. It is required of a Catholic conscience. Each being, calling itself human, has a right to brotherly love. The blood of the innocent calls for vengeance to the heavens. He, who does not support this protest – is not Catholic.

— 1942 protest of Zofia Kossak-Szczucka of Zegota

Wladyslawa Choms, "The Angel of Lvov", headed Zegota in Lvov, helped by the church and the Home Army. She described the Catholic clergy as "invaluable" to the effort, for they supplied blank baptismal certificates from which to create false documents. Wladyslaw Bartoszewski (aka "Teofil"), a co-founder of Zegota, had worked with the Catholic underground movement, the Front for the Rebirth of Poland, and was arrested in a 1940 Nazi purge of the intelligentsia, and sent to Auschwitz. Freed seven months later following pressure from the international Red Cross, Bartoszewski helped Zegota in its rescue efforts. Explaining his motivation, he later said: "I was raised a Catholic and we were taught to love our neighbour. I was doing what the Bible taught." He was recognised as Righteous Among the Nations in 1963. As head of Zegota's children's section, Irena Sendlerowa placed more than two thousands five hundred Jewish children in convents, orphanages, schools, hospitals and homes. She was captured by the Gestapo in 1943, and disabled by torture.

In the 1948-9 Zegota Case, the Stalin-backed regime established in Poland after the war secretly tried and imprisoned the leading survivors of Zegota, as part of a campaign to eliminate and besmirch Catholic resistance heroes who might threaten the new regime. Bartoszewski was imprisoned until 1954.

=== France ===
Many French clergy and religious have been honoured by Yad Vashem, and, wrote Gilbert "Many priests and nuns, and Catholic institutions throughout France did what they could to save Jews from deportation". The first deportation of Jews from Paris occurred on 27 March 1942. Mostly Polish-born, they were taken to Auschwitz. Deportations continued through the following months, and intensified in August. Gilbert wrote that, "Senior church figures took a leading role: just south of Lyon, Protestant and Catholic clerics, including Cardinal Gerlier, the Archbishop of Lyon, joined forces with Jewish resistance groups to ding hiding places for five hundred adults and more than a hundred children ... Not only Cardinal Gerlier, but also his Secretary, Monseigneur Jean-Baptiste Maury ... were honoured [by Yad Vashem] for their acts of rescue." Thousands of priests, monks, nuns, and lay people performed acts of charity toward the persecuted Jews of France. On 28 August 1942, the Germans ordered the arrest of all Catholic priests sheltering Jews.

The Times reported that Cardinal Gerlier had defiantly refused to surrender Jewish children being sheltered in Catholic homes, and that multiple arrests had been made, including of Jesuits who had been sheltering hundreds of children. The Vatican denounced the treatment of Jews in France to the Vichy French ambassador to the Holy See. Monsignor Gabriel Piguet, the Bishop of Clermont-Ferrand, allowed Jewish children to be hidden from the Nazis at the Saint Marguerite Catholic boarding school in Clermont-Ferrand and was arrested in his Cathedral on 28 May 1944. He was deported to Dachau Concentration Camp in September. At Dachau, Piguet presided over the secret ordination of Karl Leisner.

Two-thirds of the 300,000 Jews living in France at the outbreak of war survived the Nazi holocaust. Thousands of priests, nuns and lay people acted to assist French Jews. The majority of French Jews survived the occupation, in large part thanks to the help received from Catholics and Protestants, who protected them in convents, boarding schools, presbyteries and families. The Amitiés Chrétiennes organisation operated out of Lyon to secure hiding places for Jewish children. Among its members were the Jesuit Pierre Chaillet and Alexandre Glasberg, a priest formerly of the Jewish faith. The influential French theologian Henri de Lubac was active in the resistance to Nazism and to antisemitism. He assisted in the publication of Témoinage chrétien with Pierre Chaillet. He responded to Neo-paganism and antisemitism with clarity, describing the notion of an Aryan New Testament standing in contradiction to a Semitic Old Testament as "blasphemy" and "stupidity". In 1988, Lubac returned to writing about the era in Résistance chrétienne à l'antisémitisme, souvenirs 1940–1944 (Christian Resistance to Antisemitism: Memories from 1940 to 1944)

Mother Superiors of many convents provided safe haven to many French Jews. Agnes Walsh, a British Daughter of Charity who spent the war in occupied France was recognised as Righteous among the Nations for her sheltering of a Jewish family in her convent from 1943. The Archbishop of Nice Paul Remond, who facilitated underground activities hiding Jewish children in convents until they could be given safely to Christian families. The Carmelite friar Lucien Bunel (Jacques de Jesus) who was sent to the Mauthausen Death Camp for sheltering three Jewish boys at his school (dramatised in the 1987 film Au revoir les enfants, made by Louis Malle, one of his former pupils). Bunel had opened his church to refugees fleeing Nazi persecution and hired a Jewish teacher fired under discriminatory laws. He died of exhaustion days after Liberation. Although Bunel was able to inform his senior students of the Jewish identity of the boys and the secret was kept, a former pupil who had joined the resistance revealed under torture that it was Bunel who had put him in contact with the resistance.

On the Swiss border, various priests and parishes helped Jews escape to safety. Raymond Boccard and other priests assisted hundreds of refugees, including many Jews across the border into Switzerland. Abbé Simon Gallay hid Jews at Evian-les-Bains, and assisted passage to Switzerland, until arrested and deported to Germany never to return.

=== Italy ===
Despite the Italian dictator Mussolini's close alliance with Hitler's Germany, Italy did not adopt Nazism's genocidal ideology towards the Jews. The Nazis were frustrated by the Italian forces' refusal to co-operate in the round-ups of Jews, and no Jews were deported from Italy prior to the Nazi occupation of the country following the Italian capitulation in 1943. In Italian occupied Croatia, Nazi envoy Siegfried Kasche advised Berlin that Italian forces had "apparently been influenced" by Vatican opposition to German anti-Semitism. As anti-Axis feeling grew in Italy, the use of Vatican Radio to broadcast papal disapproval of race murder and anti-Semitism angered the Nazis. Mussolini was overthrown in July 1943, and the Nazi moved to occupy Italy, and commenced a round-up of Jews. Though thousands were caught, the great majority of Italy's Jews were saved. As in other nations, Catholic networks were heavily engaged in rescue efforts.

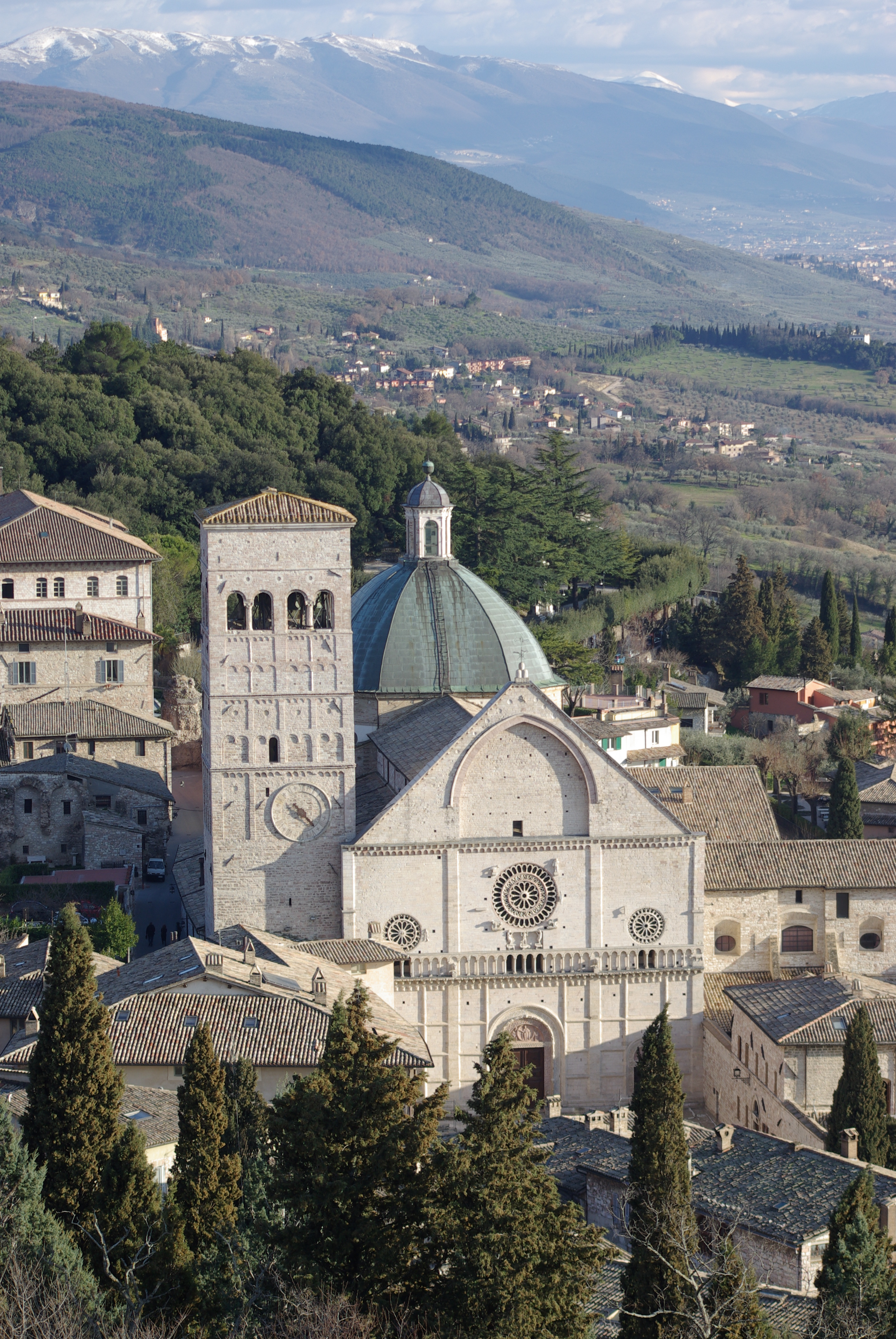
Assisi Cathedral. The Bishop of Assisi established the Assisi Network, in which the churches, monasteries and convents of Assisi served as a safe haven for several hundred Jews during the German occupation.

According to Martin Gilbert, the Pope had helped the Jews of Rome in September 1943, by offering whatever amounts of gold might be needed towards the 50 kg ransom demanded by the Nazis. At the same time, wrote Gilbert, the Capuchin Père Marie-Benoît had saved large numbers of Jews by providing them with false identification papers, helped by the Swiss, Hungarian, Rumanian and French embassies, and a number of Italian officials. A few days before the 15/16 October roundup, Pius XII personally directed Vatican clergy to open the sanctuaries of the Vatican to all "non-Aryans" in need of refuge. 4715 of the 5715 Roman Jews listed for deportation by the Nazis were sheltered in 150 institutions – 477 in the Vatican itself. As German round-ups continued in Northern Italy, the Pope opened his summer residence, Castel Gandolfo, to take in thousands of Jews and authorised institutions across the north to do the same.

From his Vatican office, and in co-operation with Pius XII, Monsignor Hugh O'Flaherty, an Irishman, operated an escape operation for Jews and Allied escapees. The Irish Independent credited him with having saved more than 6,500 people during the war. From 1943, he began to offer shelter to allied servicemen seeking sanctuary in the Vatican. Using fake documents and a clandestine communications network, O'Flaherty defied the Gestapo's war criminal commander of Rome, Herbert Kappler, and evaded capture through the German occupation of Rome. O'Flaherty's '"Rome Escape Line" hid British and American soldiers and Jews in safe houses around the city. Kappler had a white line drawn around the boundary of the Vatican and offered a bounty on O'Flaherty's head. O'Flaherty forgave Kappler after the war, and became a regular visitor to his prison cell – eventually presiding at his conversion to Catholicism. O'Flaherty's story was dramatised in the 1983 film The Scarlet and the Black and Ireland honours his work with the Hugh O'Flaherty International Humanitarian Award.

Swedish born Elisabeth Hesselblad was listed among the "Righteous" by Yad Vashem for her religious institute's work assisting Jews. She and two British women, Mother Riccarda Beauchamp Hambrough and Sister Katherine Flanagan have been beatified for reviving the Swedish Bridgettine Order of nuns and hiding scores of Jewish families in their convent during Rome's period of occupation under the Nazis.

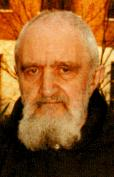
The Capuchin Maria Benedetto was named acting president of the DELASEM Jewish resistance group following the arrest of its Jewish president.

The churches, monasteries and convents of Assisi formed the Assisi Network and served as a safe haven for Jews. Gilbert credits the network established by Bishop Giuseppe Placido Nicolini and Abbott Rufino Niccaci of the Franciscan Monastery, with saving 300 people. When the Nazis began rounding up Jews, Monsignor Nicolini, Bishop of Assisi, ordered Aldo Brunacci to lead a rescue operation and arranged sheltering places in 26 monasteries and convents, and providing false papers for transit. Respect for Jewish religious practices saw Yom Kippur celebrated at Assisi in 1943, with nuns preparing the meal to end the fast. Other Italian clerics honoured by Yad Vashem include the theology professor Giuseppe Girotti of Dominican Seminary of Turin, who saved many Jews before being arrested and sent to Dacau where he was murdered in 1945; Arrigo Beccari who protected around 100 Jewish children in his seminary and among local farmers in the village of Nonantola in Central Italy; and Don Gaetano Tantalo, a parish priest who sheltered a large Jewish family. Of Italy's 44,500 Jews, some 7,680 were murdered in the Nazi Holocaust.

The Delegation for the Assistance of Jewish Emigrants DELASEM Jewish welfare, turned resistance organisation operated with the assistance of various Catholic clergymen, including Cardinal Pietro Boetto, who headed the diocese of Genoa, and his secretary Francesco Repetto; Archbishop Giovanni Cicali and Bishops Elia Dalla Costa of Florence, Giuseppe Placido Nicolini of Assisi, Maurilio Fossati of Torino, and Antonio Torrini of Lucca. Many priests also assisted the mainly Jewish led organisation, including the Capuchin Maria Benedetto (Pierre-Marie Benoit) in Rome and the Papal Nuncio in Switzerland Filippo Bernardini. When the Jewish president of the DELASEM was arrested, Fr Benoit was named the acting president, and its meetings were held at the Capuchin College in Rome.
