= The Assisi Underground (film) =

1985 film

- Directed by: Alexander Ramati
- Written by: Alexander Ramati
- Screenplay by: Alexander Ramati
- Based on: The Assisi Underground by Alexander Ramati
- Produced by: Yoram Globus; Menahem Golan
- Starring: Ben Cross; Maximilian Schell; James Mason; Irene Papas; Karlheinz Hackl
- Cinematography: Giuseppe Rotunno
- Edited by: Michael J. Duthie
- Music by: Dov Seltzer
- Production company: Golan-Globus Productions
- Release date: September 1985 (US)
- Running time: 115 min
- Countries: United States, Italy
- Language: English

The Assisi Underground is a 1985 American-Italian historical drama film, written and directed by Alexander Ramati. It is an adaptation of his 1978 novel, The Assisi Underground: The Priest who Rescued Jews, which is based on a true-life account by Father Rufino Niccacci of events surrounding the Assisi Network, an effort to hide 300 Jews in the town of Assisi, Italy during World War II. The film stars Ben Cross, Irene Papas, Maximilian Schell, Karlheinz Hackl, and James Mason in his final performance before his death in July 1984. His final role in a feature film was The Shooting Party.

== Plot ==
In 1943, Franciscan priest Rufino Niccacci is asked by the bishop of Assisi Giuseppe Placido Nicolini to covertly rescue Italian Jews from the Nazis. He mostly achieves this by hiding them in the monasteries and convents of Assisi and disguising them as Roman Catholic friars and nuns (even to the point of teaching them how to say the Christian prayers in Latin). He also befriends the Wehrmacht's chief medical officer in Assisi - a devout Catholic - who surreptitiously supplies Father Niccacci with medicines for the town's inhabitants. The film silently implies that either the German colonel did not know what Father Niccacci was doing or if he did, then he kept silent about it and in one scene he was able to use his influence with the Wehrmacht general in command of the district to save Father Niccacci from an SS firing squad.

At the start of the film's end credits, a short summary is given as to what became of each of the principal historical characters.

== Cast ==
- Ben Cross as Rufino Niccacci
- James Mason as Monsignor Giuseppe Placido Nicolini, Bishop of Assisi
- Irene Papas as Mother Giuseppina
- Maximilian Schell as Colonel Valentin Müller
- Karlheinz Hackl as Captain von Velden
- Geoffrey Copleston as Chief of Police Bertolucci
- Riccardo Cucciolla as Luigi Brizi
- Angelo Infanti as Giorgio Kropf
- Delia Boccardo as Countess Cristina
- Paolo Malco as Paolo Josza
- Roberto Bisacco as Professor Rieti
- Edmund Purdom as Cardinal Elia Dalla Costa
- Venantino Venantini as Pietro
- Maurice Poli as Vito
- Giancarlo Prete as Col. Gay
- Alessandra Mussolini as Sister Beata
- Riccardo Salvino as Otto Maionica
- Greta Vayan as Rita Maionica
- Alfredo Pea as Gino Bartali

== Critical response ==
The film received a poor response from critics.

== History ==
In April 1974, Yad Vashem in Israel named Father Niccacci as one of the Righteous among Nations.

In 1998, The New York Times published an article about an Assisi resident who had come there as a refugee.

On October 5, 2012, The National Catholic Register published a long two-part article pegged to the opening of a new exhibition based on 25 years of research into the city's role in saving thousands of refugees, including approximately 300 Jews.
