= Assisi Network =

Catholic underground network to protect Jews from Nazis

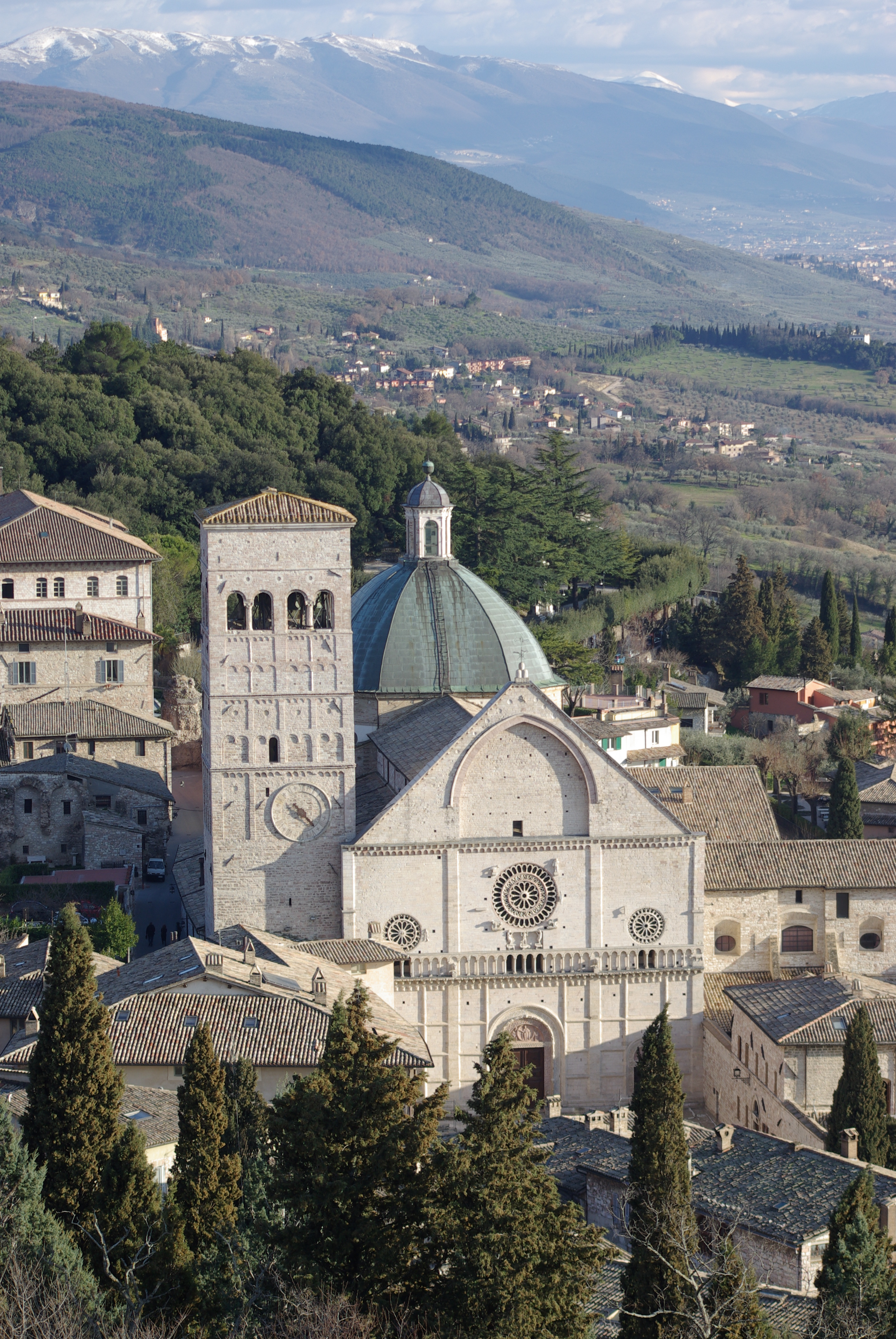
Assisi Cathedral. The churches, monasteries and convents of Assisi served as a safe haven for several hundred Jews during the German occupation.

The Assisi Network was an underground network in Italy established by Catholic clergy to protect Jews during the Nazi Occupation. The churches, monasteries, and convents of Assisi served as a safe haven for several hundred Jews.

== General History of Assisi ==
Holocaust historian Martin Gilbert credits the Assisi Network, established by Bishop Giuseppe Placido Nicolini and Father Rufino Nicacci, with saving 300 Jews.

When the Nazis began to murder Jews, Monsignor Nicolini, Bishop of Assisi, under orders from Monsignor Montini, ordered Father Aldo Brunacci to lead a rescue operation using shelters in 26 monasteries and convents, and providing false transit papers. Many of the papers claimed the person was from Southern Italy, an area liberated by American forces. Among those that were helped by Nicolini were the Baruch, Viterbi and Kropf families.

Nicolini hid Jews in places that were regularly closed to outsiders by papal monastic regulations. His "Committee of Assistance" transformed Assisi into a shelter for many Jews, and assisted others with transit through the town to other places of safety. Respect for Jewish religious practices saw Yom Kippur celebrated at Assisi in 1943, with nuns preparing the meal to end the fast.

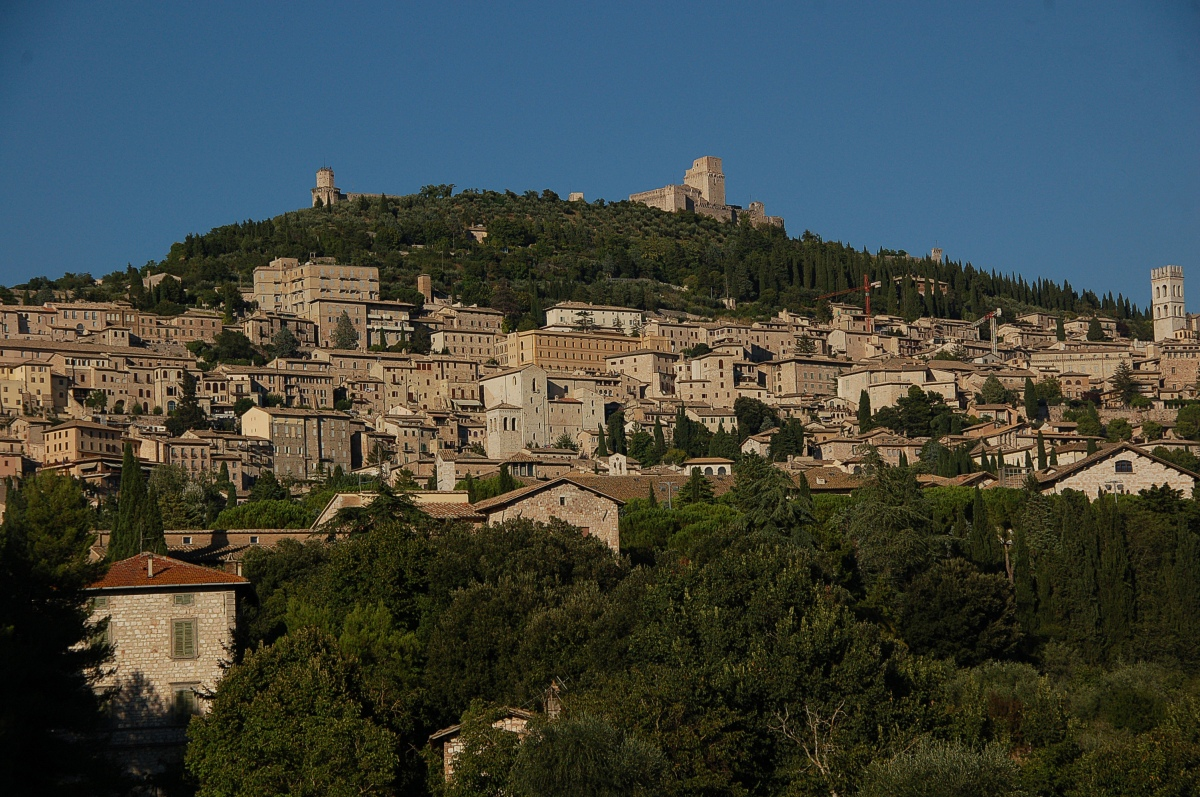
Assisi is home to Francesco di Bernardone (St. Francis of Assisi) who was the founder of the Roman Catholics' Franciscan and St. Clare Orders.

The activities of the network were the subject of a 1978 book, The Assisi Underground by Alexander Ramati, and a 1985 film starring Ben Cross and James Mason as Bishop Nicolini.

Assisi was liberated on June 16, 1944.

== Righteous among the Nations: Father Aldo Brunacci ==
Father Aldo Brunacci was the head of the Committee for Assistance and a canon in the Cathedral of San Rufino. He was recognized as Righteous among the Nations by Yad Vashem's publication in the year of 1977. Brunacci owned a huge library where he taught Latin to several people, including Mira Baruch, that enabled her to resume her studies after the war.

On May 15, 1944, Father Brunacci was arrested by governor Rocchi Perugia, who suspected his involvement in the rescue missions. Through the Bishop of Assisi's intervention, Brunacci was released, but forced to leave Assisi.

Testimony of Father Aldo Brunacci is available here

=== Famous Quotes ===
- "God is our father and we are all brothers and sisters."
- "There are times in everyone's life in which it is easy to confuse prudence with a calm life; there are times when heroism is required. Monsignor Nicolini took the path of heroism."

== Viterbi Family ==
The Viterbi family were able to live openly due to the false papers of identification provided by Brizi. In the papers they registered as residents of the town of Lecce, an area that was already liberated by the Americans, thus preventing the Nazi's from checking the papers validity.

Grazia Viterbi's name was changed to Graziella Vitelli. However, even with the false papers and safe area of residence, the family was in a constant fear of capture by the Nazis. To familiarize herself in the event of capture, Grazia learned about the town of Lecce at the Assisi library.

== See also ==
- Catholic resistance to Nazism
- Italian Resistance
- Rescue of Jews by Catholics during the Holocaust
