= And the Violins Stopped Playing =

1988 film by Alexander Ramati

- English language poster
- Directed by: Alexander Ramati
- Screenplay by: Alexander Ramati
- Based on: And the Violins Stopped Playing: A Story of the Gypsy Holocaust by Alexander Ramati
- Produced by: Alexander Ramati
- Starring: Horst Buchholz; Piotr Polk; Marne Maitland; Jan Machulski; Aleksander Bardini
- Cinematography: Edward Klosinski
- Edited by: Miroslawa Garlicka
- Music by: Leopold Kozlowski; Zdzislaw Szostak
- Production companies: Roberts/David Films; Zespol Filmowy "Tor"
- Distributed by: Orion Television Distribution
- Release date: 1988
- Running time: 116 min. (uncut - 184 min)
- Countries: United States; Poland
- Language: English

And the Violins Stopped Playing (Polish: I Skrzypce Przestały Grać) (1988) is a Polish/American historical drama film written, produced and directed by Alexander Ramati and based upon his biographical novel about an actual group of Romani people who were forced to flee from persecution by the Nazi Germany regime at the height of the Porajmos (Romani holocaust), during World War II.

== Plot ==
The story opens in 1941 in Warsaw, Poland, with Dymitr Mirga (Horst Buchholz), a prominent Romani violin player, entertaining a group of Germans—German military and SS officers—in a restaurant. The Germans enjoy the entertainment and assure the musicians that the ongoing removal of the region's Jews has nothing to do with the Romani because they are "Aryan" just like the Germans. Dymitr takes his family by train to Brest-Litovsk as he is warned by an escapee from a concentration camp as to what is happening to Warsaw's Jews. The family joins a band of Romani on the outskirts of Brest-Litovsk. The local German commander visits the camp and tells the Romani that he is giving them the houses where the Jews lived who have been "re-located" (a euphemism for sending them to concentration camps). Dymitr immediately realizes the truth, and asks the head of the Romani community to lead its evacuation into Hungary, which at that time was still independent. The leader is reluctant to comply, and the community's council eventually forces him to resign, giving his position instead to Dymitr Mirga. The son of the deposed leader had been betrothed to a beautiful Romani named Zoya Natkin (Maya Ramati), who instead chose to marry Dymitr's son, Roman (Piotr Polk).

On their journey to Hungary, some of the Romani desert the group and are killed by the Nazis. Others voluntarily split off, in hopes that by having smaller numbers they will appear to be merchants rather than Romani. Dymitr's small company eventually performs the sacrifice of selling their jewels to buy horses from another Romani community, allowing their group to move more quickly. Many are nevertheless killed by the Nazis. The sympathetic population gives them burials and provides a chance for their comrades to meet and mourn their loss. In time, the resolute Dymitr reaches Hungary with his much-diminished group of followers, including his wife Wala (Didi Ramati), his son Roman and daughter-in-law Zoya, Zoya's family and Roman's "rival," the son of the former leader, who was killed by Nazis. All Dymitr's efforts prove futile when the Germans overthrow the Hungarian government in 1944.

A Nazi column takes the captive Romani to Auschwitz, where the infamous Dr Mengele (Marcin Tronski) has been conducting medical experiments on prisoners. Before their arrival, Dymitr's daughter escapes through the window of one of the cattle trucks. At the camp, Dymitr is forced to play for the Nazis, whilst his son Roman receives minor privileges because of his skill as a translator. However, when Roman's wife Zoya dies, the young man begins to consider his father's urging that he escape. Roman approaches his friend and former rival, and recognizing that their families are marked for death, the two agree to make an attempt. The attempt succeeds, and they manage to reconnect with Roman's younger sister who had escaped from the cattle truck.

The film ends with the war over. As three Romani carriages head off into a sunset, carrying—presumably—Roman, his friend and his younger sister, the narrator concludes that the "Gypsy nation has yet to receive any compensation."

== Cast ==
- Horst Buchholz as Dymitr Mirga
- Piotr Polk as Roman Mirga
- Marne Maitland as Sandu Mirga
- Jan Machulski as Col. Krüger
- Aleksander Bardini as Greczko Szura
- Jerzy Nowak as DoctorProfessor Epstein
- Wladyslaw Komar as Dombrowski
- Wiktor Zborowski as Tomasz
- Aleksander Ford as Zenon
- Didi Ramati as Wala Mirga
- Maya Ramati as Zoya Natkin/Mirga
- Kasia Siwak as Mara Mirga
- Bettine Milne as Rosa Mirga
- Aldona Grochal as Wala's Sister
- Wiesław Wójcik as Bora Natkin
- Ernestyna Winnicka as Zoya's mother
- Marcin Tronski as Dr. Josef Mengele
- Zitto Kazann as Mikita
- Wojciech Pastuszko as Koro
- Jacek Sas-Uhrynowski as Pawel
- Marek Barbasiewicz as Count Paszkowski
- Krzysztof Swietochowski as Franko
- Judy Hecht Dumontet as Zenon's wife
- Ewa Telega as Ira

== Production ==
The film was shot on Polish locations in Łańcut, Łódź, and Kraków.

== Releases ==
The film had 1988 theatrical release in Poland under its original title of I Skrzypce Przestaly Grac and in the United States as And the Violins Stopped Playing, followed by release in Finnish theaters as Salahanke and Finnish television as Ja viulut vaikenivat, and in West Germany as Ja viulut vaikenivat. DVD release in 2003 included DVD extras of Orion trailers, video clips speaking about the film and its history, and clips about the film's stars. The film was exhibited in 2008 as part of a retrospective of the works of cinematographer Edward Klosinski. In Łódź the film was centerpoint and focus of a 2009 exhibition celebrating the 65th anniversary of the liquidation of the Litzmannstadt Ghetto.
