= Rufino Niccacci =

Italian Roman Catholic priest (1911–1976)

Father Rufino Niccacci, O.F.M. (1911–1976) was an Italian Roman Catholic priest, born in Deruta, Umbria, who shielded persecuted Jews during the Holocaust.

== World War II ==
In September 1943, Niccacci was the Father Guardian of the Franciscan Monastery of San Damiano in Assisi. At the direction of Bishop Giuseppe Placido Nicolini and Aldo Brunacci, secretary to the bishop and chairman of the committee to Aid Refugees, Fr. Niccacci provided Jews with false identities and gave them sanctuary in monasteries and convents.

After the war, Niccacci established a small settlement for destitute Christian and Jewish families in Montenero, outside of Assisi, and served as a parish priest in his home town of Deruta.

== Legacy ==
In April 1974, Yad Vashem in Israel named him as one of the Righteous among Nations.

On April 11, 1983, President Ronald Reagan, in remarks to the American Gathering of Jewish Holocaust Survivors, said:

The picturesque town of Assisi, Italy, sheltered and protected 300 Jews. Father Rufino Niccacci organized the effort, hiding people in his monastery and in the homes of parishioners. A slip of the tongue by a single informant could have condemned the entire village to the camps, yet they did not yield.

Niccacci's home town of Deruta has named a street Via Padre Rufino Niccacci in his honor.

Niccacci was a subject and the narrator of The Assisi Underground, a book written in 1978 by Alexander Ramati about Assisi's efforts to save Jewish refugees. In 1985, the book was made into a movie of the same title. More recently, the story of the Assisi underground is the subject of an Italian novel, La società delle mandorle: Come Assisi salvò i suoi ebrei (2007) by Mirti Paolo.

== See also ==
- List of individuals and groups assisting Jews during the Holocaust
