= Karlheinz Hackl =

Austrian actor (1949–2014)

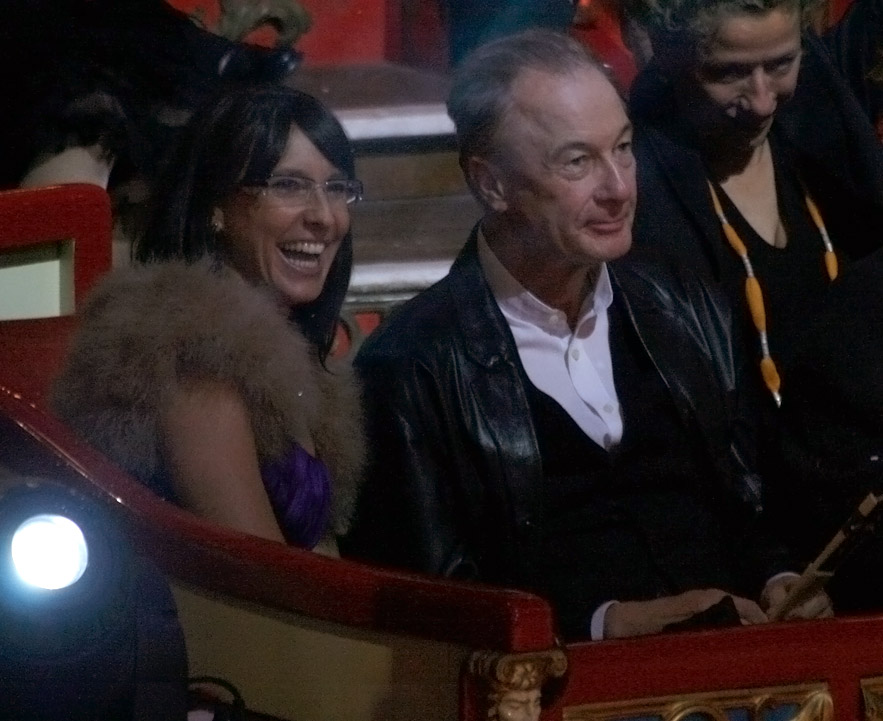
- Hackl and his wife in 2009
- Born: 16 May 1949; Vienna
- Died: 1 June 2014 (aged 65); Vienna
- Education: Vienna University of Economics and Business

Karlheinz Hackl (16 May 1949 – 1 June 2014) was an Austrian actor and theater director whose varied career included theater, television, film and cabaret performances as well as musical performances (singing).

== Biography ==
Hackl was born and was raised in Vienna's fifth district. As an only child, he grew up in stable modest circumstances in Theodor-Körner-Hof, a social housing complex. After his Matura, he went on to study Business economics at the Vienna University of Economics and Business, but began acting at the private Viennese drama school Krauss. He began his career in 1972 at the Theater der Courage in Vienna.

Between 1974 and 1976, he performed at the Viennese Volkstheater, then went on to the Thalia-Theater in Hamburg before returning to Austria in 1978 and joining the Viennese Burgtheater's ensemble, where he soon became a crowd favourite.

In 1988, Hackl debuted as theater director at the Volkstheater. He frequently appeared in movies and television series and worked with the likes of Axel Corti and Alan J. Pakula (Sophie's Choice). He is well known for his chilling role in that film as the SS physician forcing Sophie to choose which one of her two children would be gassed and which would proceed to the labor camp. He made a name of himself as playing females, as in La Cage aux Folles at Volkstheater, one of his signature roles. From 1996 onward, Hackl taught at the Max Reinhardt Seminar school of drama in Vienna. In 1997 he married a second time, to Austrian actress Maria Köstlinger. In 2009, he published an autobiography.

=== Illness/last years ===
In 2003, Hackl was diagnosed with a malignant brain tumor, but recovered and returned to the stage in 2005, also appearing in different films and series. In 2009 he published a book about his cancer and the long process of recovery and also recorded a CD with cover versions of songs from Austrian singer Georg Danzer. In 2012, he was the recipient of the Nestroy award, an Austrian award which honors theater professionals. In mid-2013, during a performance of Danzer's songs, he collapsed and was again diagnosed with cancer. On 1 June 2014, Hackl died, after a second diagnosis of cancer in 2013, in Vienna at the age of 65.

== Filmography ==
| Year | Title | Role | Notes |
|---|---|---|---|
| 1976 | Young Dr. Freud | Sigmund Freud | |
| 1982 | Sophie's Choice | SS Doctor | |
| 1985 | The Assisi Underground | Capt. von Velden | |
| 1986 | Welcome in Vienna | Treschensky | |
| 1992 | Frau Faust | Erzähler | Voice |
| 2002 | Gebürtig | Vater Gebirtig | |
| 2002 | Taxi für eine Leiche | Schorsch | |
| 2004 | C(r)ook | Konstantin | |
| 2010 | Headshots | Father | |
| 2011 | Brand – Eine Totengeschichte | Viktor Altenberg | |
| 2012 | The Wall | Hugo | |
