= The Assisi Underground =

1978 novel by Alexander Ramati

- Author: Alexander Ramati
- Publication date: 1978
- Media type: Print

The Assisi Underground: The Priests Who Rescued Jews is a 1978 novel written by Alexander Ramati based on a true-life account, told by Father Rufino Niccacci, of events surrounding the Assisi Network, an effort to hide 300 Jews in the town of Assisi, Italy during World War II.

== Plot ==
In the Italian town of Assisi during World War II, 300 Jews were sheltered and protected by a peasant turned priest, Father Rufino Niccacci. He dressed many of them as monks and nuns, taught them Catholic ritual, and hid them in the monasteries. Others lived in parishioners' homes and, with fake identity cards, found jobs and blended into the community. The town's printing press, which during the day printed posters and greeting cards, at night clandestinely printed false documents that were sent by courier to Jews all over Italy.

Not a single refugee was captured in Assisi. No one who participated in the rescue operation ever betrayed it.

The operation was aided by the German Commandant of the city, Colonel Valentin Müller a Catholic, who had been persuaded by Father Rufino that he had been sent to the town not only by the German High Command, but also by God, with the mission of protecting the Christian holy places and monasteries. Müller appealed to Marshal Kesselring to declare Assisi an open city.

When the Allies began approaching the city, one of the Jewish refugees, whose German was so excellent that he had gotten a job with the Wehrmacht, forged a letter from Kesselring declaring Assisi an open city. The colonel never suspected it to be a forgery and immediately ordered all German troops to leave town, thus saving Assisi from destruction.

== The author ==
Alexander Ramati, a Polish Jew, was one of the first war correspondents to enter Assisi after the Germans had been driven out. Inspired by his meeting with Father Rufino, he set out to tell the story of the Underground from the priest's point of view. In the years after the war, Ramati interviewed Father Rufino. The book was published in 1978.

== Film version ==
A film version of the novel was released in 1985, starring Ben Cross as Father Rufino. Alfredo Pea played Giro d'Italia and Tour de France-winning cyclist Gino Bartali, a courier for the underground.
