= Aldo Brunacci =

Italian pastor

Don Aldo Brunacci (2 April 1914 – 2 February 2007) was the pastor of the San Rufino Cathedral.

During World War II, he was head of the Assisi network (along with the Bishop Giuseppe Placido Nicolini and Father Rufino Nikachi), who worked in order to save Jews.

== Early life ==
Aldo was born on April 2, 1914, in Assisi to a family of artists. He studied at an elementary school in Assisi (named after Papa Jovana, the 23rd pope) and continued his studies in Rome.

== Activity during WWII ==
In 1943, Italy surrendered to the Allies of World War II, and as a result, the Nazis conquered Italy from the north. They appointed Benito Mussolini to be governor, who enacted the Racial Laws of segregation. This led to several Jews and resistance movements against the government to escape from the Nazis to several cities, including Assisi. More than 4000 refugees (over 300 of them were Jews) escaped the Nazis and fled to Assisi. Giuseppe Nicolini, the bishop of the church in Assisi, was given a task by the Vatican to start a secret operation to help Jews by hiding them inside monasteries, in order to help them escape the Nazis and lead a normal life. He appointed Aldo to take charge of the operation, and gave him the task of arranging hiding spots in all the monasteries in the city. Aldo was in charge of organizing fake documents and hiding the Jews inside monasteries in monks' clothes (some of the monasteries wouldn't allow people who weren't monks to enter).

The Assisi Network brought Jews to the San Quirico monastery in order to receive their fake documents. All of the documents, paperwork and their paraphernalia (usually books or holy books) were hidden in the Bishop Palace in Assisi. Don Aldo Brunacci would ride his bike from Assisi to Perugia to either give the Jews staying there their documents, or have them sign more fake documents. Aldo would leave at nighttime, arrive at the destination and stay with the Jews until morning came, when he would leave very early in order to get to Assisi in time for the lessons he was giving. Several times he would catch a ride with a trail of German vehicles, who did not know that he was sneaking fake documents into Assisi.

The Assisi Network had a lot of accomplices, and two of them were Luigi Brizi and his son, who owned a printing house in Assisi, in which they printed and forged the documents for the Jews. Gino Bartali (a champion road cyclist who was also recognized as a Righteous Among The Nations) was another persona who helped the operation, by delivering forged documents to Assisi on his bicycle.

In 1943, Brunacci and the Assisi Network established two secret schools for the Jews who lived in Assisi, where they could get educated and study religion. The Church also made efforts to supply the Jews with their religious needs in addition to their basic needs. In 1943, before Yom Kippur (the holiest day to the Jews), the Nuns made the Jews final meal before a fast, decorated the monasteries and supplied kosher food.

At that time, in Assisi there were several spies who took pictures of Brunacci in order to get proof of him smuggling the Jews, and this led to the Fascist police capturing him. After he was captured, Aldo Brunacci was judged in a courtroom in Perugia, and because it wasn't legal to judge the Bishop, Brunacci was accused of being a traitor, and he was threatened to be sent to Germany. However, because the Allies of World War II were more forgiving towards the other Allies, it was decided he would only be sent to a concentration camp. He was released when the Vatican got involved, and fled to Rome. On 4 June 1944 he was released from Rome after the Allies got involved.

== Honors ==
- On December 6, 1977, Yad Vashem recognized Aldo Brunacci as a Righteous Among The Nations and on December 11, 1977, he was given a badge of honor, awarded to him by Yad Vashem, and a tree was planted in the Garden of the Righteous Among the Nations in his honor. He attended the ceremony in Israel.

== See also ==
- Assisi network
