= Alexander Ramati =

Polish writer and director

Alexander Ramati (December 20, 1921 – February 18, 2006), born David Solomonovich Grinberg, was a Polish writer and film director.

== Biography ==
Alexander Ramati was born in Brest, Belarus, then part of Poland, into a Jewish family.

During World War II he worked as a war journalist. He entered Assisi with the Allied forces in June 1944, and there he first met Rufino Niccacci. Later he interviewed him and wrote The Assisi Underground, published in 1978. In 1985 he directed a film adaptation of the book.

In 1985 he wrote And the Violins Stopped Playing: A Story of the Gypsy Holocaust, which he also adapted to a movie, in 1988.

He died in Montreux, Switzerland.

== Bibliography ==
- Beyond the Mountains, also published as The Desperate Ones (novel) (1958)
- The Assisi Underground (1978)
- And the Violins Stopped Playing: A Story of the Gypsy Holocaust (1986)

== Selected filmography ==
- The Desperate Ones (1967)
- The Assisi Underground (1985)
- And the Violins Stopped Playing (1988)
