= Giuseppe Placido Nicolini =

Bishop of Assisi from 1928-1973

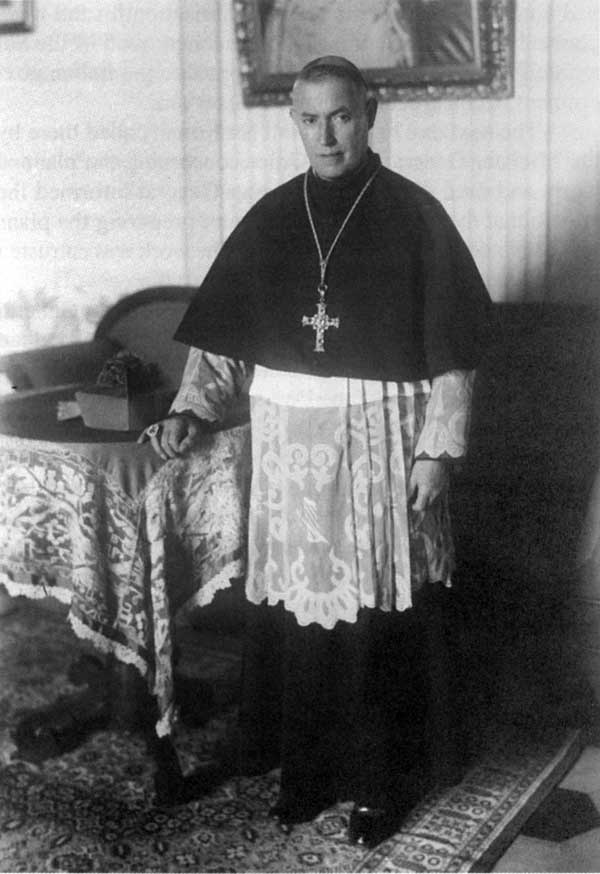
Giuseppe Placido Nicolini

Monsignor Giuseppe Placido Maria Nicolini O.S.B. (1877, Villazzano, Italy – 1973) was the Roman Catholic Bishop of Assisi from 1928 until 1973. Before serving as Bishop, he was ordained as a Benedictine priest in 1899 and was appointed Abbot of Santissima Trinità di Cava de’ Tirreni, Italy in 1919. During World War II, he established the Assisi Network which provided shelter to hundreds of Jews.

== Rescue of Jews ==
When the Nazis began rounding up Jews during the Nazi Occupation of Italy, Nicolini ordered Father Aldo Brunacci to lead a rescue operation, which became known as the Assisi Network. Nicolini authorized the hiding of Jews in places that were regularly closed to outsiders by monastic regulations, and his "Committee of Assistance" transformed Assisi into a shelter for many Jews, while assisting others to pass safely through the town to other places of safety. Sheltering places were arranged in 26 monasteries and convents, and false papers for transit were provided. Nicolini was recognized as Righteous among the Nations by Yad Vashem in 1977.
