= Pope Pius XII apostolic writings =

Pope Pius XII's apostolic writings were issued during the period of his papacy, from March 2, 1939, to October 9, 1958. This list is complete only for the years 1939-1945, with only incomplete listings for the years 1946-1958.

A

- Abbiamo Appreso November 16, 1942
- Acerrimo Moerore
- Ad Perpetuam August 28, 1958
- A Lei July 20, 1943
- Au Moment October 24, 1944

B

- Ben Volontieri October 19, 1945

C

- Chiamati December 8, 1942
- Cum Jam Lustri
- Cupimus Imprimis
- Cum Septimum June 10, 1945
- Cum Quintum March 25, 1943

D

- Dans la tristesse July 31, 1940
- Dans Quelques Semaines, a letter sent to Joseph Charbonneau, the Archbishop of Montreal, Canada, on 24 May 1947, to be relayed to the Assemblies of Canadian Young Christian Workers.
- Decimo Ex Eunte November 18, 1942
- Decennium Dum Expletur
- Denis Transactis Lustris May 5, 1942
- Dum Maerenti Animo
- Dum Saeculum Armorum April 15, 1942
- Dum difracta August 5, 1943
- Dum Post May 12, 1945

E

- Existimare vos 29 June 1942
- Ex amantissimis October 30, 1945
- Ex Communiter January 15, 1945

G

- Gli Auguri Natalizi December 2, 1942
- Gloriosam Reginam
- Giungono Da Ogni Parte December 21, 1940

I

- Intimo Gaudio June 29, 1941
- Inter Plura February 10, 1944
- Impensiore Caritate
- In cotidianis precibus March 24, 1945

L

- La Lettera January 25, 1943
- Letitiam Cepimus August 15, 1945
- L'expression June 29, 1940
- Le notizie November 30, 1942

M

- Menti nostrae

N

- Nosti Profecto July 6, 1940
- Nel Triste Indugare October 25, 1944
- Nous Avons July 14, 1945
- Novimus Nos

P

- Per hos Postremos Annos June 29, 1945
- Provide Hoc August 28, 1945
- Primo Exeunte Saeculo March 20, 1944
- Poloniae Annalibus

Q

- Quamavis Immanis November 25, 1943
- Quamvis plane April 20, 1941
- Quandoquidem April 20, 1939
- Quandoquidem March 7, 1942
- Quartum Exactum November 21, 1945
- Quocumque Oculos April 20, 1944

S

- Sacro Vergente
- Singolari Animi May 12, 1939
- Singolaris Annis April 15, 1943

T

- Tria Saecula September 1, 1945

V

- Veritatem Facientes
- Vixdum Nobis November 1, 1945
