= Persecutions of the Catholic Church and Pius XII =

Persecutions against the Catholic Church

Persecutions against the Catholic Church took place during the papacy of Pope Pius XII (1939–1958). Pius' reign coincided with World War II (1939–1945), followed by the commencement of the Cold War and the accelerating European decolonisation. During his papacy, the Catholic Church faced persecution under Fascist and Communist governments.

The Nazi persecution of the church was at its most extreme in Occupied Poland. The defeat of Fascism at the end of World War II ended one set of persecutions, but strengthened the position of Communism throughout the world, intensifying a further set of persecutions – notably in Eastern Europe, the USSR, and, later, the People's Republic of China. The Catholic Church was under attack in all Communist governed countries and lost most of its existence in Albania, Bulgaria, Yugoslavia, Romania, Communist China and the Soviet Union (including Estonia, Latvia and Lithuania).

== Fascist persecutions ==
The Catholic Church was repressed by Nazi Germany starting after the signing by the Vatican of a concordat (Reichskonkordat) with Nazi Germany in 1933, hoping to protect the rights of Catholics under the Nazi government. The terms of the concordat were violated by the Nazis. The Nazi persecutions were also adopted to various degrees by Nazi allies and puppet regimes during World War II (1939–1945). The Catholic Church in Germany was systematically repressed by the Nazis and persecution was at its most severe in Nazi occupied Poland, where churches, seminaries, monasteries and convents were systematically closed and thousands of priests and nuns were either murdered, imprisoned or deported.

According to John Cornwell, the Church was faced with a dilemma: compromise with the governments in order to maintain a structure with which to survive, or resist or confront and risk annihilation. To save its faithful, the Vatican attempted both at varying times.

=== Nazi persecutions ===
==== Germany ====
The Catholic Church had been a leading opponent of the rise of the National Socialist German Workers Party through the 1920s and early 1930s. Upon taking power in 1933, and despite the Concordat it signed with the church promising the contrary, the Nazi Government of Adolf Hitler began suppressing the Catholic Church as part of an overall policy of to eliminate competing sources of authority. The Nazis arrested thousands of members of the German Catholic Centre Party as well as Catholic clergymen and closed Catholic schools and institutions. As the Third Reich expanded, thousands more Catholic priests were imprisoned or killed and Catholic institutions disbanded by the Nazis.

According to Hitler's biographer Alan Bullock, Hitler was a "man who believed neither in God nor in conscience ('a Jewish invention, a blemish like circumcision')". Bullock wrote: Hitler thought that Catholic teachings, taken to their conclusion, "would mean the systematic cultivation of the human failure". Bullock adds that "once the war was over, [Hitler] promised himself, he would root out and destroy the influence of the Christian churches, but until then he would be circumspect":

Hitler had been brought up a Catholic and was impressed by the organisation and power of the Church. For Protestant clergy he felt only contempt. ...It was the "great position" of the [Catholic] Church that he respected; towards its teaching he showed only the sharpest hostility. In Hitler's eyes, Christianity was a religion fit only for slaves; he detested its ethics in particular. Its teaching, he declared, was a rebellion against the natural law of selection by struggle and the survival of the fittest.

Alfred Rosenberg was the original draftsman and spokesman of the Nazi Party program and official ideologist of the Nazi Party. He was a rabid anti-Semite and anti-Catholic. In his "Myth of the Twentieth Century", published in 1930, Rosenberg proposed to replace traditional Christianity with the neo-pagan "myth of the blood":

We now realize that the central supreme values of the Roman and the Protestant Churches, being a negative Christianity, do not respond to our soul, that they hinder the organic powers of the peoples determined by their Nordic race, that they must give way to them, that they will have to be remodeled to conform to a Germanic Christendom. Therein lies the meaning of the present religious search.

— The Myth of the 20th Century, Alfred Rosenberg, 1930.

Rosenberg and Hitler's senior lieutenant Martin Bormann actively collaborated in the Nazi program to eliminate Church influence – a program which included the abolition of religious services in schools; the confiscation of religious property; circulating anti-religious material to soldiers; and the closing of theological faculties.

The Nazi Government closed down Catholic publications, dissolved the Catholic Youth League and charged thousands of priests, nuns and lay leaders on trumped up charges. The Gestapo violated the sanctity of the confessional to obtain information. Erich Klausener, the President of Catholic Action in Germany, delivered a speech to the Catholic Congress in June 1934, criticizing the government. He was shot dead in his office on the Night of the Long Knives of 30 June. His entire staff was sent to concentration camps. Church kindergartens were closed, crucifixes were removed from schools, the Catholic press was closed down and Catholic welfare programs were restricted on the basis they assisted the "racially unfit".

Many German clergy were sent to the concentration camps for voicing opposition to the Nazi authorities, or in some regions simply because of their faith. Many Catholic laypeople also paid for their opposition with their lives. Over 300 monasteries and other institutions were expropriated by the SS.

The Vatican issued two encyclicals opposing the policies of Mussolini and Hitler: Non abbiamo bisogno in 1931 and Mit brennender Sorge in 1937, respectively. The Catholic Church officially condemned the Nazi theory of racism in Germany in 1937 with the encyclical "Mit brennender Sorge", signed by Pope Pius XI. Smuggled into Germany to avoid prior censorship and read from the pulpits of all German Catholic churches, it condemned Nazi ideology as "insane and arrogant". It denounced the Nazi myth of "blood and soil", decried neopaganism of Nazism, its war of annihilation against the Church, and described the Führer as a "mad prophet possessed of repulsive arrogance". It was written partially in response to the Nuremberg Laws and as response to the persecution of the church.

Following the outbreak of World War II, the Vatican under Pope Pius XII pursued a policy of neutrality. The Holy See advocated for peace and spoke against racism, selfish nationalism, atrocities in Poland, the bombardment of civilians, and other issues. The Pope allowed national hierarchies to assess and respond to their local situations, but established the Vatican Information Service to provide aid to thousands of war refugees, and saved further thousands of lives by instructing the church to provide discreet aid to Jews.

==== Poland ====
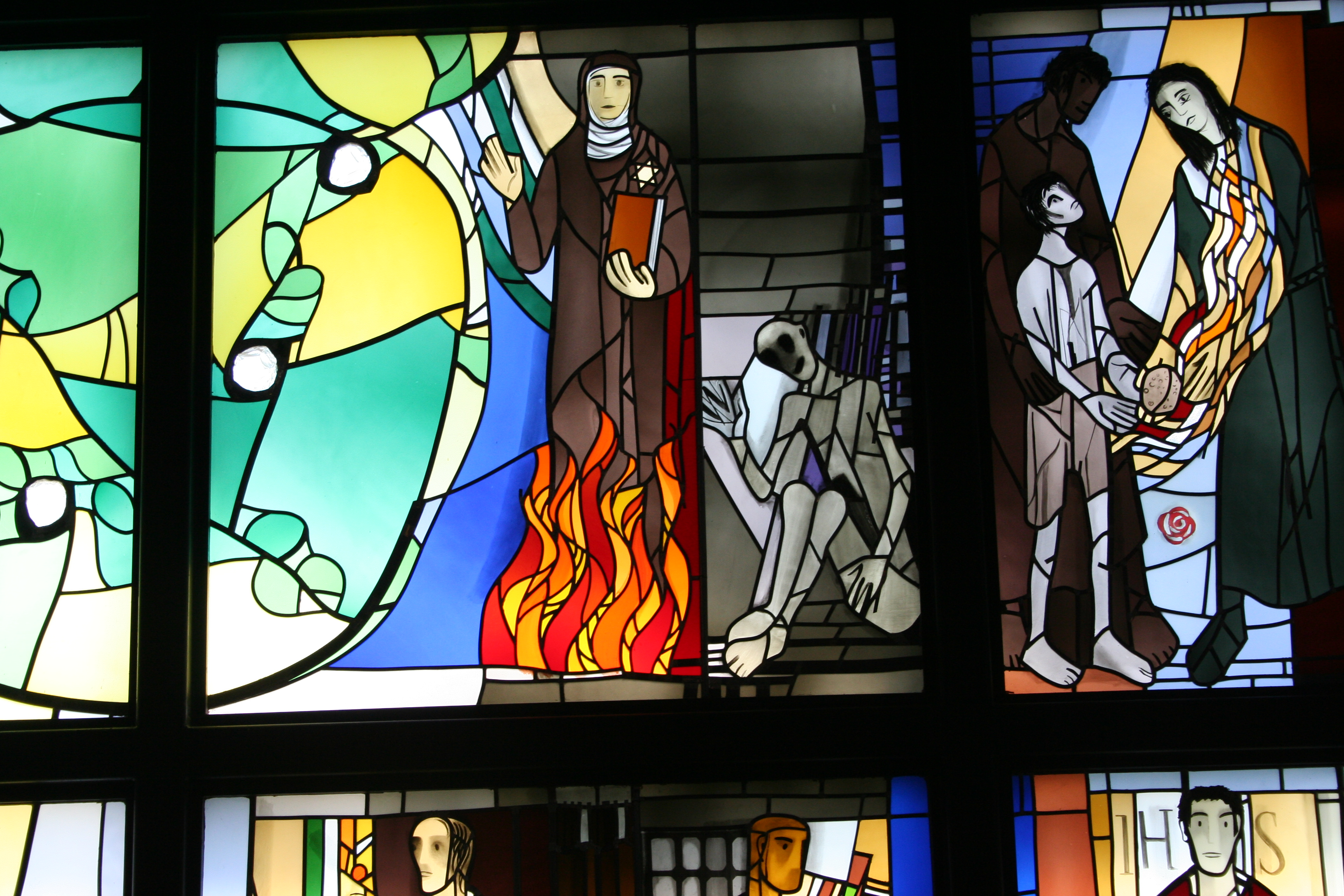
Edith Stein and Maximilian Kolbe, stained glass by Alois Plum in Kassel. The two saints were murdered as prisoners of the Nazis at Auschwitz.

According to Norman Davies, the Nazi terror was "much fiercer and more protracted in Poland than anywhere in Europe." Nazi ideology viewed ethnic "Poles" – the mainly Catholic ethnic majority of Poland – as "sub-humans". Following their 1939 invasion of West Poland, the Nazis instigated a policy of genocide against Poland's Jewish minority and of murdering or suppressing the ethnic Polish elites, including religious leaders. In 1940, Hitler proclaimed: "Poles may have only one master – a German. Two masters cannot exist side by side, and this is why all members of the Polish intelligentsia must be killed."

The Catholic Church was brutally suppressed in Poland. Between 1939 and 1945, an estimated 3,000 members (18%) of the Polish clergy were killed; of these, 1,992 died in concentration camps. During the 1939 invasion, special death squads of SS and police arrested or executed those considered capable of resisting the occupation, including professionals, clergymen and government officials. The following summer, the A-B Aktion (Extraordinary Pacification Operation) by the SS rounded up several thousand Polish intelligentsia and saw many priests shot in the General Government sector.

Historically, the church had been a leading force in Polish nationalism against foreign domination; thus the Nazis targeted clergy, monks and nuns in their terror campaigns. Treatment was at its most severe in the annexed regions, where churches were systematically closed and the majority of priests were either murdered, imprisoned or deported. Seminaries and convents were closed.

Eighty per cent of the Catholic clergy and five bishops of Warthegau were sent to concentration camps in 1939, where 1,992 Polish clergy died throughout the period; 108 from Warthegua are regarded as blessed martyrs. Around 1.5 million Poles were transported to work as forced labor in Germany. Treated as racially inferior, they had to wear purple P's sewn into their clothing – sexual relations with Poles was punishable by death. In addition to the genocide of the Polish Jews, it is estimated that 1.8 to 1.9 million Polish civilians were killed during the German Occupation and the war.

==== Elsewhere ====
During the Nazi occupation of the Netherlands, the Dutch Bishops condemned the Nazi abduction of Jews. The Nazis retaliated with a series of repressive measures. Many Catholics were involved in strikes and protests against the treatment of Jews, and the Nazis offered to exempt converts and Jews married to non-Jews if protests ceased. The Archbishop of Utrecht and other Catholics refused to comply, and the Nazis commenced a round up of all ethnically Jewish Catholics. Some 40,000 Jews were hidden by the Dutch church and 49 priests killed in the process. Among the Catholics of the Netherlands abducted in this way was Saint Edith Stein, who was murdered at Auschwitz.

=== Japanese persecutions ===
The expansion of Imperial Japan across the Asia Pacific from 1941 was accompanied by many atrocities against Catholic missionaries, clerics, nuns, and lay people. Imperial Japan had developed State Shinto as the Imperial religion and promoted the notion of the divinity of the Emperor. Japanese propaganda identified Catholics with European dominance – especially among Japan's own small Catholic community but also larger Asian communities in East Timor, Korea, French Indo-China the Dutch East Indies, the Philippines, Singapore, Hong Kong, Australian Papua, Australian New Guinea and elsewhere.

In the majority Catholic Philippines, priests and seminarians were interned. The five Columban priests killed at Malate are remembered as the Malate Martyrs.

In Australian New Guinea, priests and religious were imprisoned in concentration camps. From 1943, Japanese toleration of Christianity had shifted to confrontation. Troops interfered with Catholic religious practices and destroyed church buildings. Some 100 Catholics were killed for continuing to catechise. The martyr Peter To Rot took up duties as a catechist after Japanese invaders imprisoned the local missionaries. Forms of worship were forbidden following the Battle of the Coral Sea and To Rot was arrested and executed by the Japanese in 1945. He became the first Melanesian to be beatified in 1995.

== Communist persecutions ==
The Catholic Church was repressed following the World War II, during the Cold War, by the Soviet Union and the Communist states in Eastern and Central Europe.

In East Germany and Hungary, the Church was subjected to ongoing attacks, but was able to continue some of its activities, however on a much reduced scale. In Albania, Bulgaria, Czechoslovakia and Hungary, persecution continued to the point that the Church faced extinction. In the Soviet Union and mainland China, the Catholic Church largely ceased to exist, at least publicly, during the pontificate of Pope Pius XII.

=== Church diplomacy ===
Pius XII was a diplomat who valued diplomatic relations in order to keep contact with the local Church. As previously with Germany under the National Socialist government, Pope Pius refused to break diplomatic relations with Communist authorities.

Thus, after World War II, the Vatican kept its nuncios in Poland, Hungary, Yugoslavia, Czechoslovakia, Romania and China, until these countries severed relations interrupting communication with bishops as well. The Vatican responded by giving local bishops unprecedented authority to deal with authorities on their own, but without granting the right to define overall relations, viewed as the sole privilege of the Holy See. In encyclicals such as Invicti athletae, and Apostolic letters to Czech Bishops, Polish Bishops, the Bishops of Hungary, China, and Romania, the Pope encouraged local bishops to be firm, modest and wise in their dealings with the new communist authorities. He excommunicated all those who imprisoned cardinals and bishops as in the case of Stepinac, Mindszenty, Grösz, Beran, Wyszinski and Pacha.

In an attempt to prevent governmental usurpation of ecclesiastical offices, the Vatican threatened to excommunicate anyone who did so, or, illegally granted or received episcopal ordination. Nevertheless, the Vatican was not successful in blocking episcopal enthronements by the governments of China and Czechoslovakia. These persons were not excommunicated, however. In his last encyclical Ad Apostolorum Principis to the bishops of China, Pope Pius XII expressed the opinion that schismatic bishops and priests are the final step towards total elimination of the Catholic Church in that country. Questions were raised as to why the Vatican appointed powerful but often inexperienced American bishops as nuncios in some Eastern countries, given the anti-American, anti-imperialist tendencies in these countries. While there is no documentation on Vatican motives, a possible reason could be the relative security of US nationals in foreign countries.

=== Persecutions and Church policies ===
==== China ====
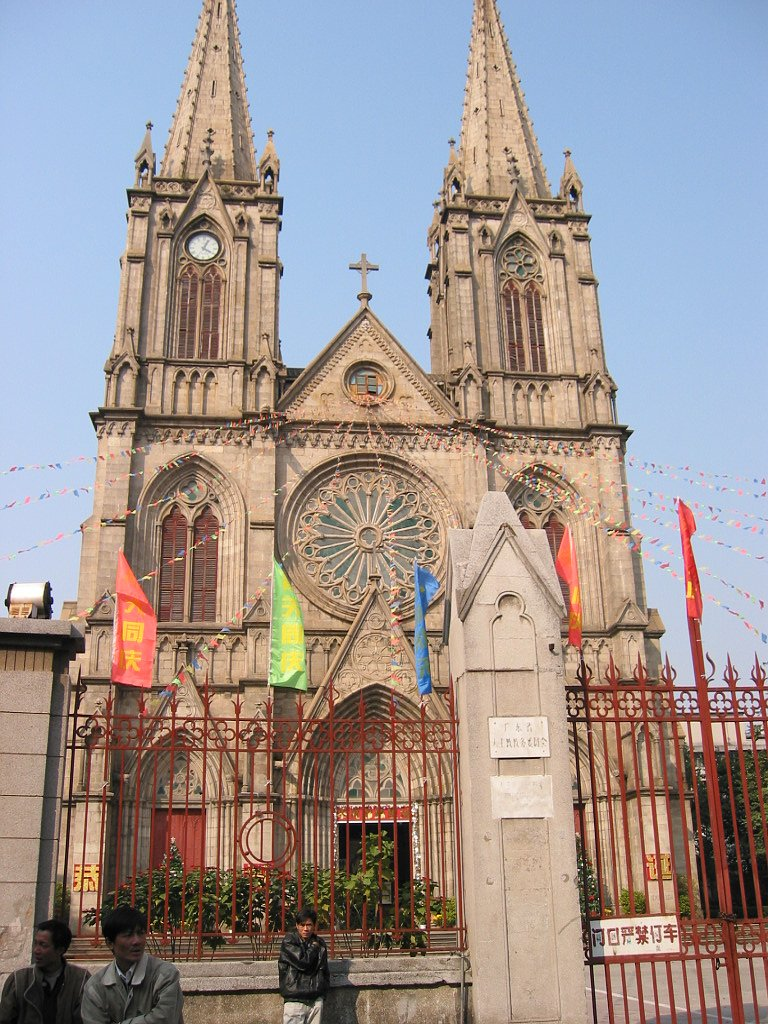
Sacred Heart Cathedral of Guangzhou

For centuries, access to the people of China was difficult for the Catholic Church, because it did not recognize local Confucian customs of honouring deceased family members. To the Chinese, this was an ancient ritual; to the Vatican it was a religious exercise which conflicted with Catholic dogma. As a result, the Church made little progress in China. Within months of his election, Pope Pius issued a dramatic change in policies. On 8 December 1939 the Sacred Congregation of the Propagation of Faith issued, at the request of Pius XII, a new instruction by which Chinese customs were no longer considered superstitious, but an honourable way of esteeming ones relatives and therefore permitted by Catholic Christians. The Government of China established diplomatic relations with the Vatican in 1943. The Papal decree changed the ecclesiastical situation in China in an almost revolutionary way. As the Church began to flourish, Pius XII established a local ecclesiastical hierarchy and received the Archbishop of Peking, Thomas Tien Ken-sin, SVD, into the Sacred College of Cardinals.

After World War II, about four million Chinese were members of the Catholic faith. This was less than one percent of the population but numbers increased dramatically. In 1949, there existed 20 archdioceses, 85 dioceses, 39 apostolic prefectures, 3080 foreign missionaries, 2557 Chinese priests.

The establishment of the People's Republic of China in 1949 put these early advances on hold and led to the persecution of thousands of clergy and faithful in China. A patriotic Chinese Church was formed. Since that time, the persecuted Catholic Church exists as a tiny fraction in secrecy and underground only. The losses were considerable. For example, in 1948, the Catholic Church had operated some 254 orphanages and 196 hospitals with 81,628 beds. Catholic clergy experienced increased supervision. Bishops and priests were forced to engage in degrading menial jobs to earn their living. Foreign missionaries were accused of being foreign agents who would turn the country over to imperialist forces.

==== Soviet Union ====
Relations between Soviet authorities and the Vatican were always difficult. Before 1917 there were two dioceses in Russia, in Mogilev and Tiraspol, with 150 Catholic parishes and around 250 priests serving half a million Catholics (a minuscule presence compared to the Russian Orthodox church).

On 23 January 1918 the Soviet government declared separation of church and State and began with the systematic dissolution of religious institutions and the confiscation of church properties. Two years later, in 1920, Pope Benedict XV issued Bonum Sana, in which he condemned the philosophy and practices of Communism. Pius XI followed this line with numerous statements and the encyclicals Miserentissimus Redemptor, Caritate Christi, and Divini Redemptoris. The pontificate of Pius XII from the very beginning faced problems, as large parts of Poland, the Baltic States, and their Catholic populations were incorporated into the USSR. At once, the United Catholic Churches of Armenia, Ukraine and Ruthenia were attacked.

==== Catholic Ruthenian and Ukrainian Churches ====
Soviet attempts to separate the United Churches from Rome reflected not only Soviet policy, but were a continuation of centuries-old Russian policies towards the papacy, already viewed as anti-Russian. Pius also was aware that, in months preceding the encyclical Orientales omnes Ecclesias, all Catholic bishops of the Ukrainian Church had been arrested, including Josyf Slipyj, Gregory Chomysyn, John Laysevkyi, Nicolas Carneckyi, Josaphat Kocylovskyi. Some, including Bishop Nicetas Budka, perished in Siberia. Subjected to Stalinist Show Trials, they all received severe sentencing. The remaining leaders of the hierarchies and heads of all seminaries and episcopal offices were arrested and tried in 1945 and 1946.

With the Catholic Church robbed of its leadership, a "spontaneous movement" for separation from Rome and unification with the Russian Orthodox Church developed. Mass arrests of priests followed. In Lemko, some five hundred priests were jailed in 1945 or sent to a Gulag, officially called "an unknown destination because of political reasons". Church institutions were confiscated and expropriated; churches, monasteries and seminaries were closed and looted, Catholic United Churches were integrated under the Moscow Patriarchy after all residing bishops and apostolic administrators were arrested. The Catholic Church of Ukraine was thus liquidated and its properties turned over to the Orthodox Church under the Patriarch of Moscow.

After Joseph Stalin died in 1953, "peaceful coexistence" became the subject of numerous discussions. In his Christmas Message of 1954, Pius XII defined possibilities and preconditions for it. He indicated Vatican willingness to practical cooperation whenever possible in the interest of the faithful. The slow pace of de-Stalinisation and the Soviet crack-down of the Hungarian Revolution thwarted major results aside from modest improvements in Poland and Yugoslavia after 1956. In January 1958, Soviet Foreign Minister Andrey Gromyko expressed the willingness of Moscow to have formal relations with the Vatican, in light of the position of Pope Pius XII on world peace and the uses of atomic energy for peaceful purposes, a position which was called identical with Kremlin policy.

==== Lithuania, Estonia and Latvia ====
The small Catholic churches of Estonia and the Church in Latvia were completely annihilated after the Soviet Union reintegrated these countries into its territory in 1945. All Church organizations were outlawed and all bishops jailed.

In 1939, Pope Pius received the ambassador of Lithuania for a final meeting prior to the Soviet occupation. At the outbreak of World War II there were 800 parishes, 1500 priests, and 600 candidates for the priesthood in four seminaries in Lithuania. As a part of the Soviet crackdown, the complete hierarchy, a large part of the clergy and about a third of the Catholic population was deported.

==== Poland ====
With the war over, the Pope discontinued his war-time policy of neutrality, stating that he had abstained from protests during the war in spite of massive persecutions. The Communist Party of Poland assumed governmental control in 1947, and began to confiscate Church properties in the months thereafter. By late 1947, Catholic educational institutes, kindergartens, schools, and orphanages were expropriated as well. Starting in 1948, mass arrest and show trials began to take place against Catholic bishops and clergy. Pope Pius XII responded with an apostolic letter Flagranti Semper Animi, in which he defended the Church against attacks and Stalinist persecution tactics. However, pressures against the Church increased with the de facto outlawing of religious meetings and organizations. Pope Pius responded with a letter commemorating the 10th anniversary of the beginning of World War II, Decennium Dum Expletur. He writes that while the Polish people had suffered like nobody else during the war, the suffering continues ten years afterwards. Cum Jam Lustri commemorates the death of two Polish Cardinals, Hlond and Sapieha, and encourages the Church in Poland. In honour of Saint Stanisław, Pope Pius XII issued Poloniae Annalibus, giving consolation and again expressing his certitude that Christ will win and the persecution will end. By 1952 some 1000 priests were incarcerated, all seminaries closed, and religious institutes dissolved. On 19 November 1953 the pontiff addressed the diplomatic corps to issue a protest against the incarceration of Cardinal Stefan Wyszynski. After the arrest of the cardinal, authorities supported patriotic priests who were open to separation from Rome. At the 300th anniversary of the successful defence of Jasna Góra, Pope Pius XII wrote again to Poland, congratulating the courageous defenders of the faith in his time. Gloriosam Reginam salutes the modern day Polish martyrs and expresses confidence in victory for Mary, Queen of Poland. He salutes Cardinal Stefan Wyszynski upon his return from arrest in October 1956.

With Invicti athletae in 1957, Pope Pius addressed in strong words the Polish episcopate for the 300th. anniversary of the martyrdom of Saint Andrew Bobola by the Russians: "The haters of God and enemies of Christian teaching attack Jesus Christ and his Church." The Pope counselled endurance and bravery. The people and clergy must overcome many obstacles, with sacrifices of time and money, but they must never give in. The Pope urges his bishops in Poland not to be overwhelmed by the situation but to mix courage with prudence, and knowledge with wisdom: "Act boldly, but with that Christian promptness of soul which goes hand in hand with prudence, knowledge, and wisdom. Keep Catholic faith and unity."

==== Czechoslovakia ====
"They can take away your freedom, but they cannot tear the Catholic faith from your hearts. They can turn you into martyrs, but they can never turn you into traitors." In 1945, the Czechoslovak government expelled its Hungarian and German populations from Czechoslovak territories, thus greatly reducing the percentage of Catholics in the country. After its Communist coup in 1948, Czechoslovakia expelled the Papal Nuncio and closed Catholic seminaries for the formation of priests. Prague outlawed all religious institutes and Catholic associations and gradually suppressed the Catholic press. Attempts were made to divide the clergy into opposing camps by creating a government-controlled association of priests headed by Bishop Josef Plojhar. Archbishop Josef Beran and others refused to participate and were subjected to public show trials and long incarcerations. In 1949, the governmental "Church Office" took complete control of the Catholic Church.

==== Hungary ====
After the occupation of Hungary by the Red Army in 1945, socialist policies gained ground only gradually in the country. But in the following five years, the Church lost 3.300 schools, numerous hospitals, and newspapers, while 11.500 religious were asked to leave their convents, monasteries, and institutes. The nuncio was expelled already in 1945. The Church attempted to come to agreement with the government in 1950, when the continuation of about ten Catholic schools was permitted. The overwhelming experience of Hungarian Catholicism was the public show trials and degradations of Archbishop József Grősz and Cardinal József Mindszenty, which led to a complete exclusion of the Church from all public life and Hungarian society.

===== József Mindszenty =====
József Mindszenty had been jailed by the Germans, freed by the Soviet army, and was ordained Bishop in 1944. After the communist party coup in Hungary, a reign of terror backed by the Soviet army was instituted Pope Pius XII named Mindzenty Primate of Hungary and admitted him to the College of Cardinals in 1946. "After a propaganda campaign, he was arrested on charges of collaboration with the Nazis, spying, treason, and currency fraud. None of the accusations were true. He was tortured mentally and physically and beaten daily with rubber truncheons until he signed a confession. His show trial was condemned by the United Nations. "The trumped up proceedings, fully reported in the West, gripped and horrified Catholics the world over." The Cardinal remained in prison until 1956 when he was freed, during the Hungarian Revolution. After the failure of the revolution, he lived in the American embassy for the following 15 years.

==== Romania, Bulgaria and Albania ====
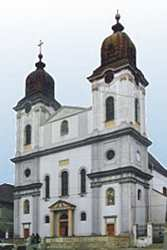
Sfânta Treime Romanian Catholic Metropolitan Cathedral

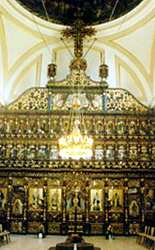
The interior of the Sfânta Treime Romanian Catholic Metropolitan Cathedral

After World War I, Romania inherited large parts of Catholic Hungary including large Catholic populations, which were not always treated well between the wars. The Apostolic Constitution Solemmni Conventione of 1930 includes a concordat between Romania and the Vatican. It allowed for four dioceses and free exercise of religion within the country. Because of rival interpretations the concordat was reenacted ten years later in 1940. In 1948, the Communist government withdrew from the concordat and closed most Catholic institutes. Only two small dioceses were permitted to continue, and the others considered non-existent. The six united bishops and several Latin Church bishops were jailed to long sentences. All schools were closed and Catholic activities outlawed.

Bulgaria became a People's Republic on 15 October 1946. The new constitution of 1947 limited religious activities. Massive Church persecution followed. The Church lost all its bishops, organizations, and religious institutes. Most of the priests and religious perished within five years, many of them in Siberia.

In Albania, the Communist government assumed the role of liberator, since the country was under Italian occupation since 1939. The Catholic Church was denounced as the Church of the oppressors. All foreign priests and religious were expelled. Domestic bishops, priests, and religious were killed, jailed, or sent to unknown destinations. As in other countries, a peace-loving national Church was attempted as well. The government prided itself on having eradicated religion and closed every Catholic Church.

==== Yugoslavia ====
After defining relations with the Eastern Orthodox Church in 1929, Muslims in 1931, and Protestants and Jews in 1933, a Concordat was signed in 1935 between Yugoslavia and the Vatican. After the Orthodox Church excommunicated all politicians involved in its parliamentary passing, the government withdrew the text from final vote in the upper house. De Facto however, the spirit of the concordat was accepted and the Church began to flourish in the years prior to World War II. The war was difficult for the Church, as the country was largely occupied by Italian and German forces. The Independent State of Croatia, which declared independence from the Kingdom of Yugoslavia, was open to the needs of the Church, which led to open collaboration of several Church officials with Croatian government policies.

After the war, the systematic persecution of the Church began as it did in all the other Communist countries. Some 1300 of the clergy was assassinated. including 139 Franciscan friars. and 50% of the clergy was jailed. As in Czechoslovakia and other countries, Belgrade created government-controlled organizations of priests, in an attempt to divide the clergy. A major bone of contention was Aloysius Stepinac, who was elevated to the College of Cardinals in 1953. To President Tito "a provocation", this represented to Pope Pius "a just recognition of his extraordinary merits and a symbol of our affection and encouragement for our beloved sons and daughters, who testify to their faith with steadfastness and courage in very difficult times." Pius explained that he did not intend to insult the Yugoslavian authorities, but neither did he agree with any of the unjust accusations which resulted in the punishment of the Archbishop. Stepinac was not permitted to receive the red hat in Rome and remained under house arrest (unable to participate in the 1958 conclave) until his death in 1960. Pope John Paul II beatified him. After his death, relations to the Vatican improved significantly. In 1974, the Church in Yugoslavia counted 15,500 priests, religious, and nuns

=== Persecution of religious institutes ===
Religious institutes and institutions are historically visible targets in time of conflict and strife. Their houses, convents or monasteries were looted, burned or destroyed throughout Europe for centuries in virtually all European countries. The beginning of the pontificate of Pius XII coincided with the end of the Civil War in Spain, in which, in addition to thousands of faithful, some 4184 secular priests, 2365 religious, and 283 female religious were killed within a three-year period.

In World War II, the religious of Poland suffered from an exceptionally brutal German occupation. A 1940 thirteen-point program provided that "all religious institutes, convents and monasteries will be closed because they do not reflect German morality and population policy." The German policy, to treat Poles as subhuman "Untermenschen" was especially brutal against representatives of religious orders. Gestapo raids led to the murdering, assassination, and deportation to concentration camps of numerous religious, including the Franciscan friar Maximilian Kolbe.

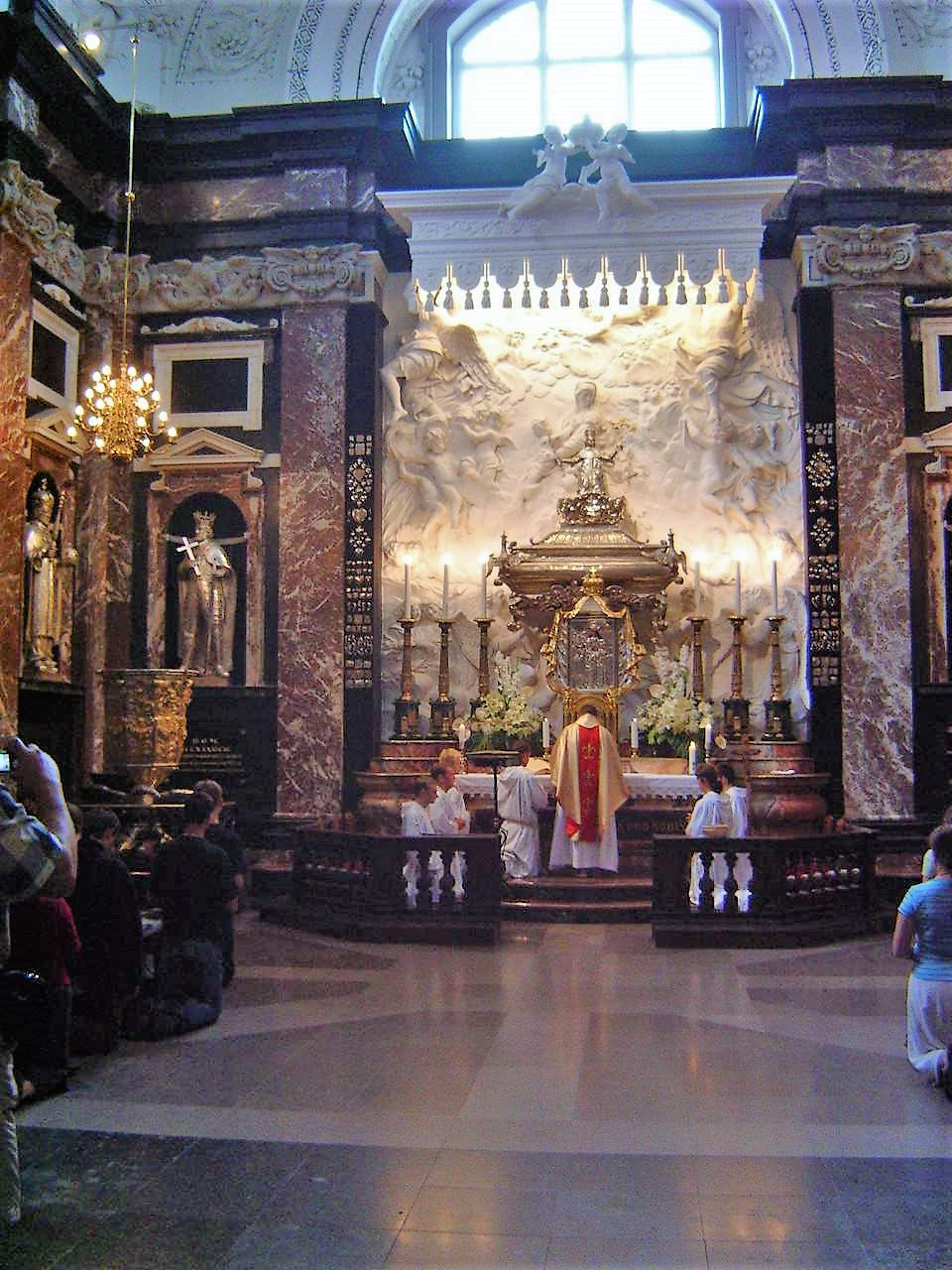
Chapel of Saint Casimir with his coffin in Vilnius, Lithuania

In the Dachau concentration camp alone, some 2800 Polish priests and religious were incarcerated, of whom approximately 1000 were killed or died of hunger. Between April and October 1942, 500 Polish religious died in Dachau, in part due to mistreatment, hunger or the gas chambers. Long-time inmate Bishop Kozlowiecki reports: "What a happy day if I was beaten only once or twice." Especially brutal was Holy Week in 1942. One thousand and eight hundred Polish priests and religious went through punishment drills and exercises uninterrupted from morning to night every day. Pope Pius XII informed the cardinals in 1945 that among all the horrors which priests and religious had to endure in concentration camps, the fate of Polish inmates was by far the worst.

After 1945, Poland was resurrected, but the Polish government continued the attacks against the Catholic Church. All religious were forced to leave hospitals and educational institutions and their properties were confiscated. Within seven years, fifty-four religious were killed. One hundred and seventy priests were deported to gulags. However, after a change of government in 1956, the condition of the Church improved. Harassment and persecution of the Church continued but religious vocations were permitted and Poland became the only Eastern country which contributed in great numbers religious missionaries to worldwide service.

In all East European countries, after World War II, persecution of religious assumed new dimensions. All religious houses in Ukraine were confiscated and their inhabitants either jailed or sent home. All religious houses were confiscated and closed in Lithuania as well. In Albania, all religious orders were forcibly disbanded. In Bulgaria and Czechoslovakia, all monasteries and religious institutes ceased to exist after 1950. In Hungary, 10,000 members of religious orders were ordered to leave their residences within three months; some 300 were permitted to remain and through an agreement between the Hungarian hierarchy and the government eight Catholic schools were reopened.

In Yugoslavia, all orders were disbanded after the war and properties confiscated. In Bosnia, numerous religious figures were killed, among them 139 Franciscan priests. However, as Yugoslavia distanced itself increasingly from Moscow, significant improvements were noticed in Slovenia and Croatia during the last two years of the Pacelli pontificate. In China and North Korea Catholic religious no longer existed. Foreign missionaries were expelled and the fate of most local religious is unknown.

== Decrees of the Holy Office on Communism ==
The Vatican, having been silent about Communist excesses during the war, displayed a harder line on Communism after 1945.

== Encyclicals of Pope Pius XII on Church persecutions ==
The name of a Papal Encyclical is always taken from its first two or three words.

No.	Title		Subject	Date	Text
No.	Latin	English translation	Subject	Date	Text
1.	Orientales omnes Ecclesias	"All the Eastern Churches"	On the 350th Anniversary of Reunion of the Ruthenian Church with Rome	23 December 1945	(English)
2.	Anni Sacri	"On the Holy Year"	On a Program For Combating Atheistic Propaganda Throughout The World	12 March 1950	(English)
3..	Ad Sinarum gentem	"To the Chinese people"	On the Supranationality of the Church	7 October 1954	(English)
4.	Luctuosissimi eventus	"Sorrowful events"	Urging Public Prayers for Peace and Freedom for the People of Hungary	28 October 1956	(English)
5.	Laetamus admodum	"We are most pleased"	Renewing Exhortation for Prayers for Peace in Poland, Hungary, and the Middle East	1 November 1956	(English)
6.	Datis nuperrime		Lamenting the Sorrowful Events in Hungary, and Condemning the Ruthless Use of Force	5 November 1956	(English)
7.	Invicti athletae	"Of the unconquered athlete"	On St. Andrew Bobola	16 May 1957	(English)
8.	Meminisse iuvat	"It is helpful to recall"	On Prayers for the Persecuted Church	14 July 1958	(English)
9.	Ad Apostolorum Principis	"At the Prince of the Apostles"	On Communism and the Church in China	29 June 1958	(English)

== See also ==
- Persecution of Christians in the Soviet Union
- Persecution of Christians in Warsaw Pact countries
- Seat 12
