= Pope Pius XII and Poland =

Pope Pius XII and Poland includes Church relations from 1939 to 1958. Pius XII became Pope on the eve of the Second World War. The invasion of predominantly Catholic Poland by Nazi Germany in 1939 ignited the conflict and was followed soon after by a Soviet invasion of the Eastern half of Poland, in accordance with an agreement reached between the dictators Joseph Stalin and Adolf Hitler. The Catholic Church in Poland was about to face decades of repression, both at Nazi and Communist hands. The Nazi persecution of the Catholic Church in Poland was followed by a Stalinist repression which was particularly intense through the years 1946–1956. Pope Pius XII's policies consisted in attempts to avoid World War II, extensive diplomatic activity on behalf of Poland and encouragement to the persecuted clergy and faithful.

In Poland, Pius XII made "one of his most controversial decisions" regarding the reorganization of dioceses during World War II.

== Background ==
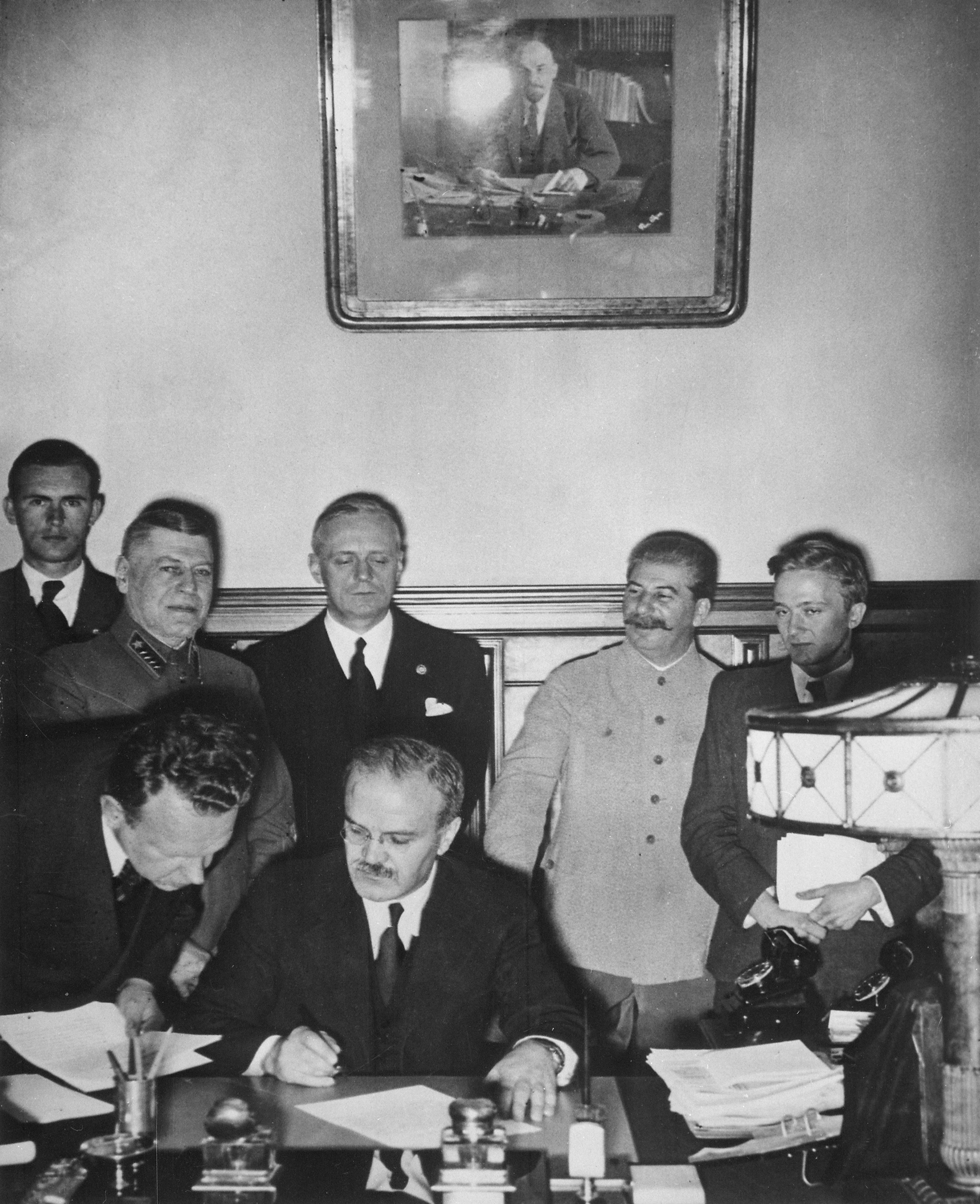
Soviet Prime Minister Vyacheslav Molotov signs the Molotov–Ribbentrop Pact. Behind him stand (left) German Foreign Minister Joachim von Ribbentrop and (right) Joseph Stalin. The Pact created a Nazi–Soviet alliance and sealed the fate of Poland.

Catholicism had a presence in Poland stretching back almost 1,000 years. By 1939, around 65% of Poles professed to be Catholic. The invasion of predominantly Catholic Poland by Nazi Germany in 1939 ignited the Second World War. Britain and France declared war on Germany as a result of the invasion, while the Soviet Union invaded the Eastern half of Poland in accordance with an agreement reached with Hitler. The Catholic Church in Poland was about to face decades of repression, both at Nazi and Communist hands. Poland's allegiance to the papacy gave its plight an international dimension, of which both the Nazi and Soviet occupying powers were aware. In Poland, the Church was well organised, and clergy were respected. Garlinski wrote that the Polish Church's "thousand year link with Rome afforded it some protection. The German Reich contained 30 million Catholics, who recognised the Pope's authority... and [each German ruler], however strongly opposed to Rome, had to take account of this..."

== First months of the papacy ==
Pope Pius XII succeeded Pius XI in March 1939, on the eve of World War Two. The new Pope faced the aggressive foreign policy of Nazism, and perceived a threat to Europe and the Church from Soviet Communism, which attacked religion—"each system attacked religion, both denied freedom and the victory of either would be a defeat for the Church", wrote Garlinski. After his March 1939 election to the papacy, Pope Pius XII was mostly concerned with the possible outbreak of a new war, starting with the Polish–German conflicts. "Nothing is lost with peace, everything may be lost in a war", was his message immediately after his election.

Consequently, he tried to mediate, not by engaging in border or other disputes, but by creating a readiness to communicate and negotiate on all sides. The Pope himself attempted to invoke a conference of five belligerents, Poland, Germany, the United Kingdom, France and Italy, excluding the Soviet Union. Italy was willing, Germany showed little interest, France and the UK were open but hesitant. Poland felt safe and informed the Holy See, that she managed to keep the Soviet Union disinterested in the dispute with Germany, thus strengthening the Polish position. The Vatican disagreed with this optimistic assessment, and urged communication and caution. After the media reports of a surprising arrangement between Germany and the Soviet Union, the Polish Ambassador Kazimierz Papée informed the Vatican, that the Hitler-Stalin Pact actually strengthened the Polish position, because the Soviet Union showed no more interest in European conflicts.

== World War Two ==
=== Nazi–Soviet invasion of Poland ===
Nazi Germany invaded Poland from the West on 1 September 1939 and a period of brutal occupation commenced. Racist Nazi ideology targeted the Jews of Poland for extermination and categorized ethnic Poles (mostly Catholics) as an inferior race. Jews were rounded up into Ghettos or sent to extermination camps. The ethnic Polish intelligentsia were also targeted for elimination, with priests and politicians alike murdered in a campaign of terror. Forced labour was also extensively used. The Red Army invaded Poland from the East on 17 September 1939. The Soviets were also responsible for repression of Polish Catholics and clergy, with an emphasis on "class enemies". Operation Barbarossa, the German attack on the Soviet Union was launched in June 1941, shattering the Nazi-Soviet non-aggression pact, and bringing Eastern Poland under Nazi domination. Norman Davies wrote: The Nazi plan for Poland entailed the destruction of the Polish nation. This necessarily required attacking the Polish Church, particularly in those areas annexed to Germany. According to Hitler biographer Ian Kershaw, in his scheme for the Germanization of Eastern Europe, Hitler made clear that there would be "no place in this utopia for the Christian Churches".

=== Policy of Pope Pius XII ===
Pius XII lobbied world leaders to avoid war and then sought to negotiate a peace, but was ignored by the belligerents, as Germany and Russia began to treat Catholic Poland as their colony. In his first encyclical, Summi Pontificatus of 20 October 1939, Pius stated that all races and cultures are of equal value, because the creator did not create inequality, and responded to the invasion. The encyclical attacked Hitler's war as "unchristian" and offered these words for Poland:

[This is an] "Hour of Darkness"... in which the spirit of violence and of discord brings indescribable suffering on mankind... The nations swept into the tragic whirlpool of war are perhaps as yet only at the "beginnings of sorrows"... but even now there reigns in thousands of families death and desolation, lamentation and misery. The blood of countless human beings, even noncombatants, raises a piteous dirge over a nation such as Our dear Poland, which, for its fidelity to the Church, for its services in the defense of Christian civilization, written in indelible characters in the annals of history, has a right to the generous and brotherly sympathy of the whole world, while it awaits, relying on the powerful intercession of Mary, Help of Christians, the hour of a resurrection in harmony with the principles of justice and true peace.

— Summi Pontificatus – Pope Pius XII, Oct. 1939

The Polish episcopate led by Cardinal August Hlond, who had repeatedly urged the Holy See to issue protests, warnings, or condemnations, was "deeply grateful". Still, the papal protest, radio reports, L'Osservatore Romano documentaries and other protests issued later did little or nothing to alleviate the suffering of the Polish people and clergy in the following war years under German and Soviet occupation. In fact the persecutions got worse. The Pope therefore chose his words carefully, because of his basic belief, expressed later that became his policy during the war:

Every word from Us should be carefully considered and weighted in the very interest of those who suffer, as not to make their position even more difficult and more intolerable than previously, even though inadvertently and unwillingly."

Though Pius had assisted with the drafting of the anti-Nazi encyclical Mit brennender Sorge, which remained binding through the war, he did not repeat it during the war, and, wrote Garlinski, he was conscious that Hitler's expansion brought 150 million Catholics under the control of the Third Reich, and that conditions for Catholics outside of Poland could be adversely affected by his pronouncements. This "restrained and reasoned stance", wrote Garlinski, though justified in the long term, "did not suit the Poles" who expected more forthright language against the Nazis. The Holy See refused German requests to fill the bishoprics of the annexed territories with German bishops, claiming that it would not recognise the new boundaries until a peace treaty was signed. But these diplomatic actions were not considered sufficient on the ground in Poland, where more forthright statements were expected.

France and other countries beseeched the Holy See to protest the unprovoked aggression of the invasion, and, possibly, condemn national socialism and communism anew. According to Stehle, the Vatican under-secretary Giovanni Battista Montini refused, on the basis that any word against Germany or Russia would be dearly paid for by the Catholics in the occupied territories. Earlier, Pope Pius XII, in order to remain impartial during the war, had ordered Vatican officials and L'Osservatore Romano, to use terms like "socialism", "communism" and "national socialism" factually not degradingly. thus reserved for the Papacy, which often issued its own news items there, the sole right, to issue possible condemnations and warnings.

German and Polish bishops urged condemnations, arguing, that the enemies of the Church insinuated that the Vatican had given up on Poland. At the same time, Adam Stefan Sapieha, the outspoken Cardinal Archbishop of Kraków, Poland, and, after the premature flight of Cardinal August Hlond into exile, leading representative of the Church in Poland, and others were equally afraid, that Papal condemnations could aggravate the already very difficult situation for Polish clergy and faithful. Poles in exile asked for strong condemnations while those in the countries were more cautious. While Church diplomacy worked in quiet ways, the official papal radio station, Vatican Radio was rather frank in its reporting, especially in its transmissions in Polish, Lithuanian and other local languages in the occupied areas. But this backfired, as one Lithuanian bishop protested:

These reports should be stopped at once. They only incite local occupation authorities and hurt the persecuted Church in great measure. We know what our situation is like, what we need is news from the Catholic world and Catholic teachings."

Unknown at the time were the extensive diplomatic activities of the Holy See on behalf of Poland. During World War II, the Vatican spent more political and diplomatic efforts on Polish matters, than any on other nation in the world: The eleven volumes of the Actes et documents du Saint Siège relatifs à la Seconde Guerre Mondiale list some five-hundred and eightyone documents on Poland. They include communication with German and allied authorities, the Polish government in London exile and of apostolic administrators in the "Warthegau" The Holy See was aware of complaints against its quiet diplomacy. Asked, why the Vatican had not published it documents and protests, Cardinal Secretary of State Luigi Maglione replied

They have not made public so that the faithful are not subjected to even more fierce persecutions. Isn't this what has to be done? Should the father of Christianity increase the misfortunes suffered by the Poles in their very own country."

On 30 September 1939 the L'Osservatore Romano reported that the Pope had spoken to the Polish community in Rome:

- Thousands hundred of thousands of people are suffering at this very moment and a great many have already been sacrificed in this war, which, as you know, we have tried to prevent with all possible means.
- A vision of deep senseless horror and dark despair passes before our eyes, a multitude of fugitives and wanderers who have no motherland, no home anymore. We hear the heart-rending cry of mothers and brides, weeping for their loved ones, slain on the battlefield. We hear the desperate complaints of those of old age, and those who are weak in health, deprived of all help and nursing.
- We hear the children weep for their parents, who are no more, the cry for help of the wounded and the death rattle of the dying, many of whom never belonged to the fighting forces. We feel their sufferings, their misery and their mourning as our own.
- The love of the Pope for his children knows no restriction or borders. He wishes that all children of the Church feel at home with the father who loves all equally. This paternal love cares for he afflicted and wishes to care too, for each one of you. This is however not the only comfort. In the eyes of God, of his Vicar, of all decent men, you possess other treasures, which are not kept in steel safes but in your heart and in your soul, first of all, the glory of military courage,....
- Moreover, in the darkness now hanging over Poland, there still remains the brilliant light of happy memories of your great national past. ... In your history, people have known hours of agony and apparent death, but also of revival and resurrection. ... We do not say, wipe away your tears, Christ who wept over the death of Lazarus and the ruins of his own land, gathers the tears now, shed for your dead and for Poland in order to reward them later. Tears for Poland, that will never die. —L'Osservatore Romano, 1 October 1939

In April 1940, the Holy See advised the US government of Franklin D. Roosevelt that all its efforts to deliver humanitarian aid had been blocked by the Germans, and that it was therefore seeking to channel assistance through indirect routes like the American "Commission for Polish Relief". In 1942, the American National Catholic Welfare Conference reported that "as Cardinal Hlond's reports poured into the Vatican, Pope Pius XII protested against the enormities they recounted with unrelenting vigor". The Conference noted the Pope's 28 October Encyclical and reported that Pius addressed Polish clergy on 30 September 1939, speaking of "a vision of mad horror and gloomy despair" and saying that he hoped that despite the work of the "enemies of God", Catholic life would survive in Poland. In a Christmas Eve address to the College of Cardinals, Pius condemned the atrocities "even against non-combatants, refugees, old persons, women and children, and the disregard of human dignity, liberty and human life" that had taken place in the Polish war as "acts that cry for the vengeance of God". The Vatican used its press and radio to tell the world in January 1940 of terrorization of the Polish people. On 16 and 17 November 1940, Vatican Radio said that religious life for Catholics in Poland continued to be brutally restricted and that at least 400 clergy had been deported to Germany in the preceding four months:

The Catholic Associations in the General Government also have been dissolved, the Catholic educational institutions have been closed down, and Catholic professors and teachers have been reduced to a state of extreme need or have been sent to concentration camps. The Catholic press has been rendered impotent. In the part incorporated into the Reich, and especially in Posnania, the representatives of the Catholic priests and orders have been shut up in concentration camps. In other dioceses the priests have been put in prison. Entire areas of the country have been deprived of all spiritual ministrations and the church seminaries have been dispersed.

— Vatican Radio, November 1940

During the war, Stefan Wyszynski under the pseudonym Dr. Stefan Zuzelski, wrote several articles on this subject, such as Vatican and Poland and Pius XII and Poland. He explained the position of the Vatican:

If sometimes news about Poland were scarce and tragic moments were passed over in silence, this was done only on the request of Polish circles, who had discovered, that the Germans took revenge on our prisoners for programs about their exploits in Poland."

The Pope according to Wyszynski, never ceased to recognize Polish sovereignty and did not make any personal or territorial changes, while the frequent Vatican press reports continued to report about Poland "as a country standing with the free states fighting for a better future". Still, State authorities tried to discredit Pope Pius XII in the eyes of Polish society. His actual speeches and messages to the people of Poland were not known in Poland. More than a generation later, during the first visit of Pope John Paul II in Warsaw, Stefan Wyszynski used the occasion to read one of these messages of Pope Pius XII to the Polish faithful. John Paul II explained, how Pope Paul VI, also maligned, had been barred from entering Poland.

=== Polish losses ===
It is estimated that, despite all public and private protests and numerous diplomatic initiatives, two-thousand and three hundred and fifty-one (2.351) members of the clergy and religious were murdered (four bishops, 1996 priests, 113 clerics, and 238 female religious). Sent to concentration camps were 5.490 Polish clergy and religious, (3642 priests, 389 clerics, 342 lay brothers and 1117 female religious) a majority of which perished there. In addition the Germans occupiers decreed, that the Church in the Polish territories annexed immediately to the Reich lose all legal standing as an entity and thus all legal recourse. All Church organizations were disbanded, and, Germany outlawed: All baptisms for persons under 21 years, religious education, confessions in Polish, male and female religious orders, schools, Church charities, Church collections, Catholic cemeteries and Sunday school. The Papal nuncio was appointed as Nuncio to Poland as well, a step which the German government could not object to, since he was already accredited. However, his protests notes and interventions, were not even accepted by the German Secretary of State Ernst von Weizsäcker, an SS officer, who informed the nuncio, that Poland is outside the geographical area of the Reichskonkordat, and therefore not his business. Attempts by German clerics to improve the Polish situation by including the annexed Polish territory into German hierarchical jurisdiction, and thus make it de facto subject to the protective measures of the Reichskonkordat, were rejected by both the Vatican and the Polish government in exile as a de facto recognition of the German annexation. The Vatican did however, at the request of desperate Polish clergy appoint temporary German administrators in two Polish dioceses, after the occupation authorities killed the local bishops, blocked the nomination of any Polish national for the vacancies and refused to negotiate with any Polish bishop.

== Soviet occupation ==
With the Second World War over, Soviet forces stationed in Poland and the Communist Party in increasing control of the Polish government, the Pope and the Polish episcopate anticipated persecution and communication problems with the Polish bishops, He therefore granted Facultas Specialis, special powers to Cardinal August Hlond in his dealings with the Church and state authorities. Hlond's pastoral priority were the former German territories, now assigned to Poland, and called Recovered Territories by the Communist Polish state authorities, and Western Lands by the Polish church hierarchy itself. 15 August 1945, one week after the Potsdam Conference Hlond created facts by establishing Polish administrators in these areas. The new government, almost as expected, began its campaign against the Church by withdrawing from the concordat and expelling the Papal Nuncio and refusing to accept the appointments by Cardinal Hlond. The Vatican was accused of refusing to accept the authority of the new communist government and for breaking the concordat in the war years, by appointing temporary German administrators in Polish territory.

In 1950, the new Primate of Poland, archbishop Stefan Wyszyński negotiated an agreement with the authorities, which gave the Church minimal breathing space. Pope Pius XII gave his full approval. According to Wyszyński, "The letters of Pope Pius XII confirm, that he approved of, and even praised Cardinal Hlond's actions in the Western lands". Yet, the political storms continued over the Church in Poland, as PAX and government officials continued to agitate against "German revanchists", "imperialists" and NATO. April 1951, Stefan Wyszyński met the Pope and informed by him of the political complexities in the Western Lands. Pope Pius "approved and blessed all the conduct and methods" of the Primate, and was confident. Polonia fara da se, Poland will take care of itself, was the Pope's famous remark. Nevertheless, the Roman Catholic Church until 1972 would continue to recognize the pre-1939 Polish territorial borders only, and appointed German apostolic visitators to the Archdiocese of Breslau, Diocese of Warmia and other formerly German diocesan sees, who were to minister to the eastern German expellees and refugees in the state of West Germany.

The war being over, Pope Pius XII, faced with a long-term problem, discontinued his war-time policy of neutrality. His policies continued to be pragmatic rather than ideological. He condemned the beginning persecution but, as in the case of Nazis before, did not name persons or political parties. He reminded Polish and Soviet authorities that he had abstained from protests during the war, despite massive persecutions. This did not seem to impress the communist party of Poland, which began to confiscate Church properties in the months thereafter. By late 1947, Catholic educational institutes, kindergartens, schools, orphanages were expropriated as well. Starting in 1948, mass arrest and show trials began to take place against bishops and clergy. Pope Pius XII responded with an apostolic letter Flagranti Semper Animi, on 18 January 1948, in which he defended the Church against attacks and Stalinist persecution tactics. The authorities increased the pressures against the Church via legislation, de facto outlawing religious meetings and organizations. Pope Pius responded with a letter commemorating the 10th anniversary of the beginning of World War II, Decennium Dum Expletur. Although the Polish people had suffered like nobody else. The war is officially over, but, so Pope Pius, the suffering of the Polish People continues. The Apostolic Letter Cum Jam Lustri commemorates the death of two Polish Cardinals, August Hlond and Adam Stefan Sapieha – whom he dearly appreciated – and gives courage to the Church in Poland. The Pope admires the ardent Polish love for the Virgin Mary.

- The love which burns in you to her, is unparalleled. We received clear proof, during the last war, when Polish soldiers erected an altar in her honour in the smoking ruins of Monte Cassino. Polish soldiers also saved the Basilica della Santa Casa of Loreto from burning and destruction, risking their own lives. But the struggle continues.

In honour of Saint Stanislaw, Pope Pius XII issues Poloniae Annalibus, giving consolation and again expressing his certain conviction, that Christ will win and the persecution end. By 1952 some 1,000 priests incarcerated, all seminaries of religious orders closed. On 19 November 1953 the pontiff addressed the Diplomatic Corps to issue a protest against the incarceration of Stefan Wyszyński. After the arrest of the Cardinal, Communist authorities support patriotic PAX priests, who aspire a separation from Rome. At the 300th anniversary of the successful defence of Jasna Góra, Pope Pius XII writes again to Poland, congratulating the courageous defenders of the faith in his time. Gloriosam Reginam salutes the modern day Polish martyrs and expresses confidence in victory of the queen of Poland. He salutes Cardinal Wyszynski upon his return from arrest in October 1956.

In 1957, Pope Pius addressed in strong words the Polish episcopate, which celebrated the 300th. Anniversary of the martyrdom of Andrzej Bobola through the Russians. "The haters of God and enemies of Christian teaching attack Jesus Christ and his Church". The Pope asks for endurance and bravery. The people and clergy must overcome many obstacles, and even sacrifices in time and money, but they must never give in. Pius comforts his Polish brothers saying that everywhere, there is always a bit of martyrdom in Christian day-to-day life, if one strives for perfection. Bobola is a model saint because he kept his faith intact and defended it with all means. Polish people should "look to the reward God promises to all who with perfect fidelity, unflagging readiness, and burning love live, labor, and strive to defend and spread throughout the world His Kingdom of peace". The Pope urges his bishops in Poland not to be overwhelmed by the situation but to mix courage with prudence, and knowledge with wisdom:

Act boldly, but with that Christian promptness of soul, which goes hand in hand with prudence, knowledge, and wisdom. Keep Catholic faith and unity."

=== The last episcopal appointment of Pope Pius XII ===
One of the last episcopal appointments of Pope Pius XII and the last appointment of a Polish bishop, was a young priest from the archdiocese of Kraków, Karol Wojtyla. On 4 July 1958 Pope Pius XII named him titular bishop of Ombi and auxiliary to Archbishop Eugeniusz Baziak, apostolic administrator of the Archdiocese of Kraków.

Some twenty years later, Pope John Paul II recalled meeting the pontiff as a student in Rome at the Belgian College. "I want to recall the great Pope Pius XII, who forty years ago was called to the Holy See. He left a most profound impression on me." Introduced by the Rector as a student from Poland, Pope Pius looked at him "with obvious emotion, paused for one moment, and said to me in Polish, 'Praise be to Jesus Christ.'" Wojtyla felt encouraged by Pope Pius XII, "less than two years after World War II, which was a most terrible trial for my country."

== Pope Pius XII on Poland ==
For the war years 1939–1945, twenty-five communications of Pope Pius XII and over two hundred communications of the Holy See- mainly from Cardinal Secretary of State Luigi Maglione, Giovanni Battista Montini and Domenico Tardini – with Polish Church and State officials are included in the 600 documents of:

- Le Saint Siege et la Situation Religieuse en Pologne et dans les pays Baltes, 1939–1945, in Actes et Documents Du Saint Siege Relatifs a la Seconde Guerre Mondiale, Libreria Editrice Vaticana 1967
- 1945–1958
- Per Hos Postremos Annos, Apostolic Letter, 29 June 1945,
- Czestochoviensis Beatae Mariae Virginis, Apostolic Letter, 16 January 1946,
- Immaculato Deiparae Cordi, Apostolic Letter, 23 December 1946,
- Flagranti semper animi, Apostolic Letter, 18 January 1948
- Decennium Dum Expletur, Apostolic Letter, 1 September 1949,
- Cum Jam Lustri, Apostolic Letter, 1 September 1951,
- Poloniae Annalibus, Apostolic Letter, 16 July 1953,
- Speech to the Diplomatic Corps regarding the persecution of Cardinal Wyzynski, 19 November 1953,
- Gloriosam Reginam, Apostolic Letter, 8 December 1955,
- Message to Cardinal Stefan Wyszyński (after his liberation),
- Invicti Athletae, Encyclical on Saint Bobola, 16 May 1957,
