= Holy See–Poland relations =

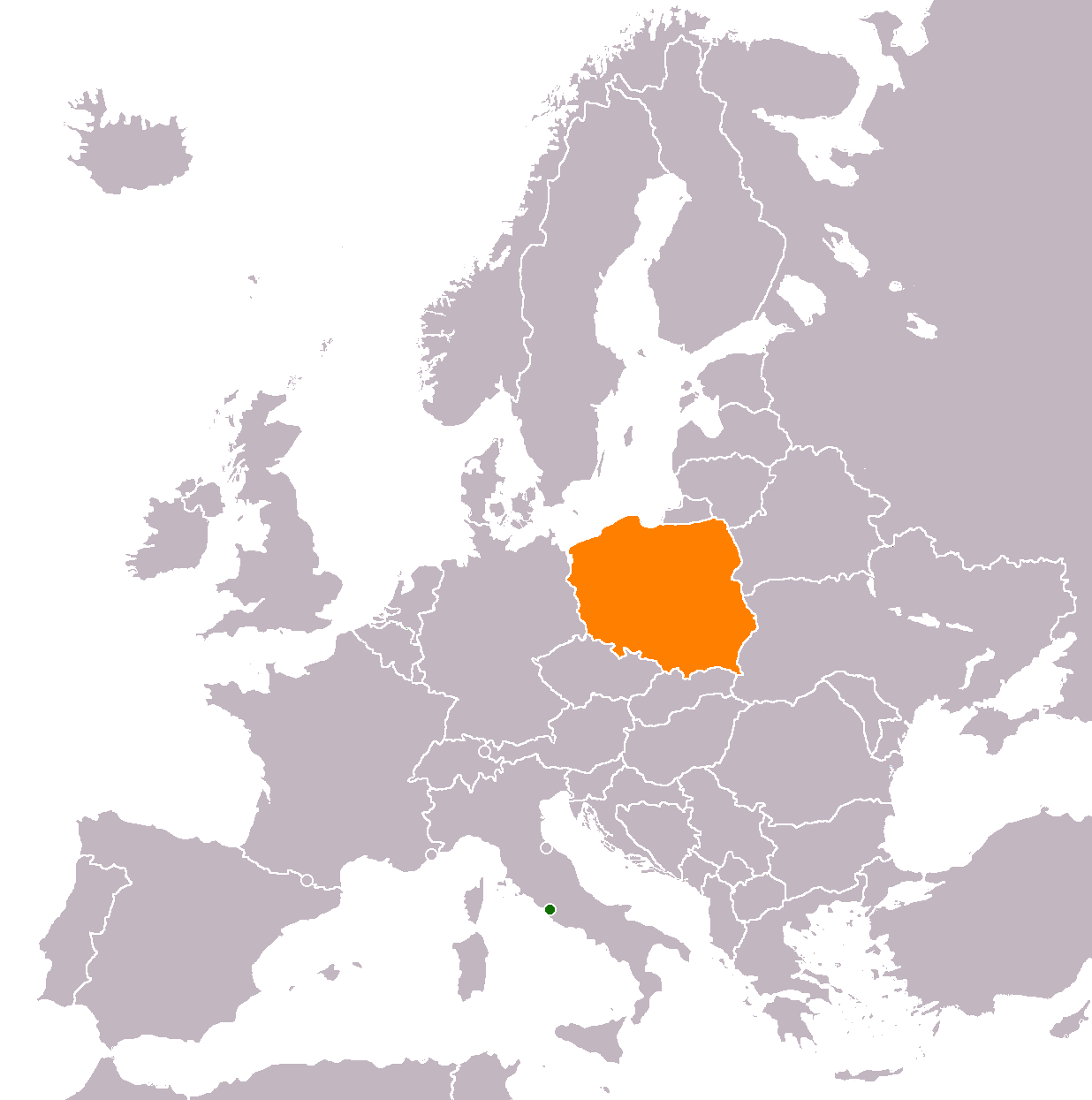
- Holy See: Poland

Holy See–Poland relations (Latin: Relationes inter Sancta Sedes et Polonia, Italian: Relazioni tra la Santa Sede e la Polonia, Polish: Stosunki między Stolicą Apostolską a Polską) are foreign relations between the Holy See and the Republic of Poland. According to the 2021 census, approximately 71.3% of Poles belong to the Catholic Church.

== History ==
Relations between the Holy See and Poland have existed at the level of Nunciature since 1555, when the first resident diplomatic representative of the Holy See with the rank of Nuncio arrived in Warsaw. The signing of a concordat at the beginning of that century was an earlier testimony to the existence of even earlier non-residential diplomatic relations between them. With the Third Partition of Poland in 1795, the Polish state ceased to exist, but regained its independence in 1918 after World War I. In 1919, the Holy See and Poland established diplomatic relations.

After World War II, the Holy See refused to recognize the Polish Provisional Government of National Unity that was formed in 1945. The Holy See maintained diplomatic relations with the Polish government-in-exile in London until 1958. In 1971, discussions on the normalization of relations between Poland and the Holy See began. In October 1978, Polish-born Archbishop of Kraków Karol Józef Wojtyła was elected Pope and became known as Pope John Paul II, becoming the first Pope from Poland and the first Pope of Slavic origin. In June 1979, Pope John Paul II made his first official visit to Poland. Pope John Paul II has been credited with being instrumental in bringing down Communism in Central and Eastern Europe, including Poland. In 1989, diplomatic relations were fully re-established between the two countries.

== Papal visits ==
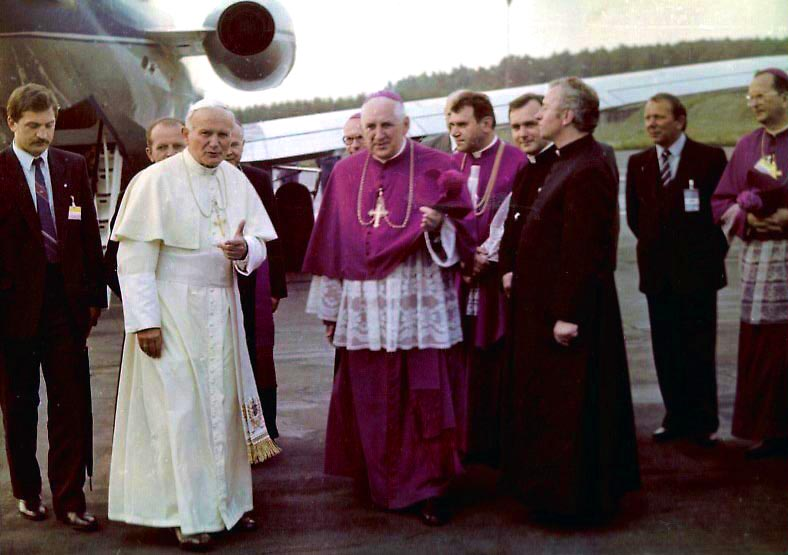
Pope John Paul II arriving to Gdynia on his third Papal visit to Poland, June 1987.

Papal visits from the Holy See to Poland

- Pope John Paul II (1979, 1983, 1987, June & August 1991, 1995, 1997, 1999, 2002)
- Pope Benedict XVI (2006)
- Pope Francis (2016)

== Nuncios ==
The first Nuncio to Poland, appointed in 1555, was Luigi Lippomano. Suffering from ill-health, he left in February 1557. The list of his successors as Nuncios to the Kingdom of Poland and then to the Polish–Lithuanian Commonwealth is given at Apostolic Nuncio to Poland.

The first resident representative to the resurgent Polish state after the First World War was Achille Ratti, the future Pope Pius XI, who was appointed Visitor in April 1918 and Nuncio in 1919. The Nunciature to Poland was classed as a Nunciature of the First Class, the same level as those in Madrid, Paris and Vienna. Archbishop Ratti was soon appointed Archbishop of Milan and left Poland on 4 June 1921. His successor was Archbishop Lorenzo Lauri, whose nomination had been published on 25 May 1921. Lauri negotiated a concordat with the restored Polish state. On 20 December 1926, he was made a cardinal. From June to October 1923 Monsignor Giovanni Battista Montini, the future Pope Paul VI, worked as Secretary at the Warsaw Nunciature. Archbishop Francesco Marmaggi was Nuncio to Poland from 1928 until becoming a cardinal on 16 December 1935. His successor, Archbishop Filippo Cortesi, who was Nuncio to Poland at the outbreak of the Second World War, left Warsaw on 5 September 1939, following the Polish government-in-exile to Bucharest.

Following the resumption of full diplomatic relations on 17 July 1989, Pope John Paul II appointed as the first Nuncio to Poland after half a century Archbishop Józef Kowalczyk on 28 August 1989. He held this post for an exceptionally long time, until on 8 May 2010 he was appointed archbishop of Gniezno and primate of Poland. His successor is Celestino Migliore, appointed on 30 June 2010.

== Resident diplomatic missions ==
- Holy See has an Apostolic Nunciature in Warsaw.
- Poland has an embassy to the Holy See based in Rome.
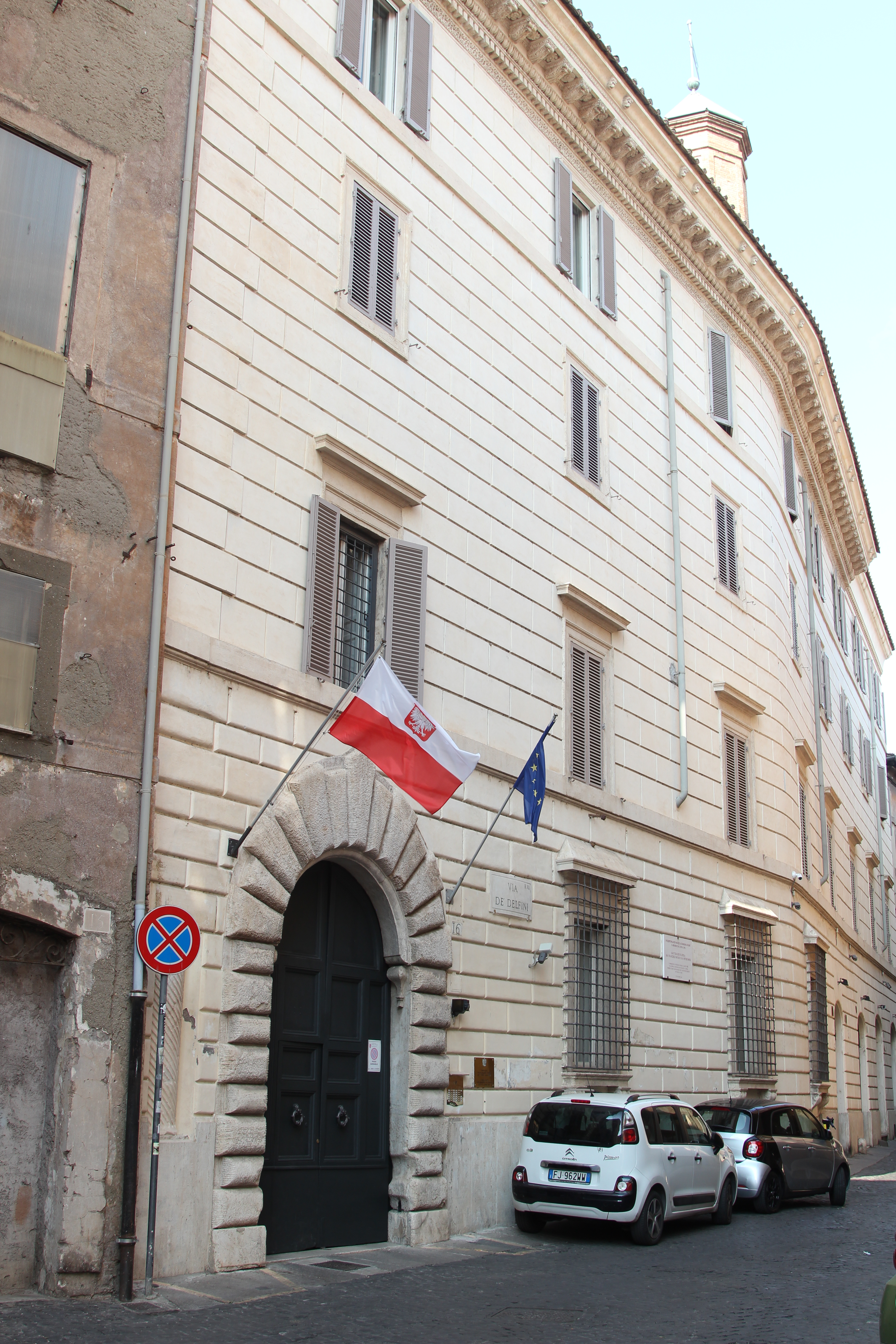
Embassy of Poland to the Holy See in Rome

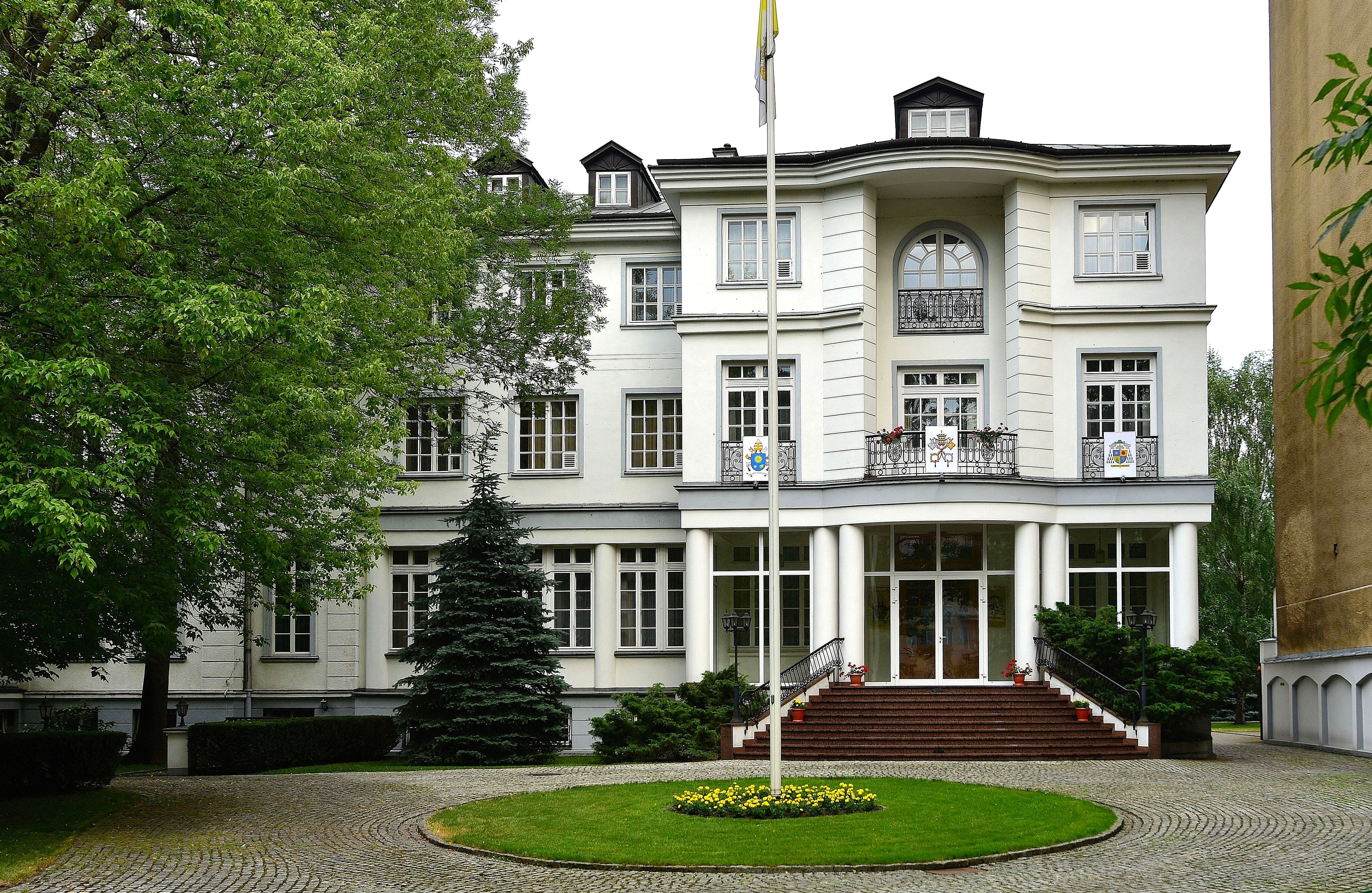
Apostolic Nunciature in Warsaw

== See also ==
- Apostolic Nunciature to Poland
- Index of Vatican City-related articles
- Poloniae Annalibus
- Pope Pius XII and Poland
