= Angelus =

Christian devotion

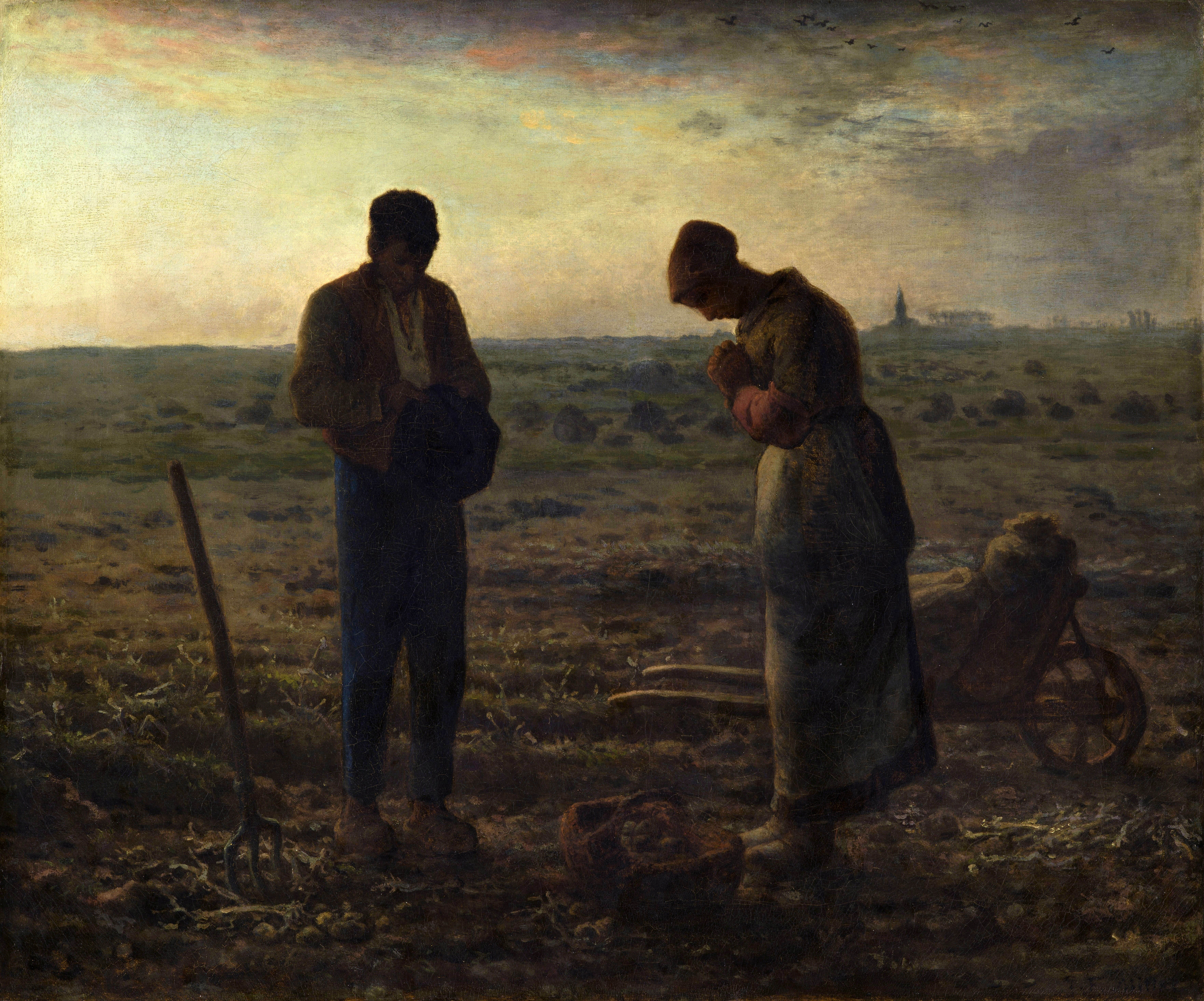
The Angelus (1857–1859) by Jean-François Millet

The Angelus (/ˈændʒələs/; Latin for "angel") is a Catholic devotion commemorating the Incarnation of Christ. As with many Catholic prayers, the name Angelus is derived from its incipit—the first few words of the text: Angelus Domini nuntiavit Mariæ ("The Angel of the Lord declared unto Mary"). The devotion is practised by reciting as versicle and response three Biblical verses narrating the mystery, alternating with the prayer "Hail Mary". The Angelus exemplifies a species of prayers called the "prayer of the devotee".

The devotion is traditionally recited in Roman Catholic churches, convents, monasteries and by the faithful three times a day: in the morning, at noon and in the evening (usually just before or after Vespers). The devotion is also observed by some Western Rite Orthodox, Lutheran, and Anglican churches.

The Angelus is usually accompanied by the ringing of the Angelus church bells, which is a call to prayer and to spread goodwill to everyone. The angel referred to in the prayer is Gabriel, a messenger of God who revealed to the Virgin Mary that she would conceive a child to be born the Son of God (Luke 1:26–38). In Eastertide, the Angelus is replaced by the Regina coeli.

== History ==
According to Herbert Thurston, the Angelus originated with the 11th-century monastic custom of reciting three Hail Marys at the evening, or Compline, bell.

The first written documentation stems from the Italian Franciscan friar Sinigardi di Arezzo (died 1282). Franciscan friaries in Italy document the use in 1263 and 1295. The current form of the Angelus prayer is included in a Venetian Catechism from 1560. The older usages seem to have commemorated the resurrection of Christ in the morning, his suffering at noon, and the annunciation in the evening. In 1269, St Bonaventure urged the faithful to adopt the custom of the Franciscans of saying three Hail Marys as the Compline bell was rung.

The Angelus is not identical to the "noon bell" ordered by Pope Calixtus III (1455–58) in 1456, who asked for a long midday bell-ringing and prayer for protection against the Turkish invasions of his time. In his 1956 Apostolic Letter Dum Maerenti Animo about the persecution of the Catholic church in Eastern Europe and China, Pope Pius XII recalls the 500th anniversary of the "noon bell", a prayer crusade ordered by his predecessors against what they considered to be dangers from the East. He again asks the faithful throughout the world, to pray for the persecuted Church in the East during the mid-day Angelus.

The custom of reciting it in the morning apparently grew from the monastic custom of saying three Hail Marys while a bell rang at Prime. The noon time custom apparently arose from the noon time commemoration of the Passion on Fridays. The institution of the Angelus is by some ascribed to Pope Urban II, by some to Pope John XXII in the year 1317. The triple recitation is ascribed to Louis XI of France, who in 1472 ordered it to be recited three times daily. The form of the prayer was standardised by the 17th century.

The manner of ringing the Angelus—the triple stroke repeated three times, with a pause between each set of three (a total of nine strokes), sometimes followed by a longer peal as at curfew—seems to have been long established. The 15th-century constitutions of Syon Abbey dictate that the lay brother "shall toll the Ave bell nine strokes at three times, keeping the space of one Pater and Ave between each three tollings". The pattern of ringing on Irish RTÉ Radio One and television, RTÉ One, consists of three groups of three peals, each group separated by a pause, followed by a group of nine peals, for a total of eighteen rings.

In his Apostolic Letter Marialis Cultus (1974), Pope Paul VI encouraged the praying of the Angelus considering it important and a reminder to faithful Catholics of the Paschal Mystery, in which by recalling the incarnation of the son of God they pray that they may be led "through his passion and cross to the glory of his resurrection."

== Modern usage ==
It is common practice that during the recital of the Angelus prayer, for the lines "And the Word was made flesh/And dwelt among us", those reciting the prayer bow or genuflect. Either of these actions draws attention to the moment of the Incarnation of Christ into human flesh.

In some Catholic institutions or Catholic schools, the Angelus is recited periodically. In most Franciscan and contemplative monasteries, the Angelus is prayed three times a day.

=== Angelus broadcasts ===
In Germany, particular dioceses and their radio stations broadcast the Angelus. In addition, Roman Catholic churches (and some Protestant ones) ring the Angelus bell thrice daily.

In Ireland, The Angelus is currently broadcast every night before the main evening news at 6 p.m. on the main national TV channel, RTÉ One, and on the broadcaster's sister radio station, Radio 1, at noon and 6 p.m. In 2015, in advertising for a commission to independent film makers to produce versions of the Angelus, RTÉ described the playing of the Angelus as follows:

The daily "Angelus" broadcast on RTÉ One is by far RTÉ's longest-running and most watched Religious programme. It's also, possibly, the most controversial. For some, the reflective slot, which airs for just one minute in every 1440 per day and on only one RTÉ TV channel, is as much part of Ireland's unique cultural identity as the harp on your passport; for others, it's an anachronism – a reminder of more homogeneously and observantly Christian times.

As of 2015, RTÉ Audience Research found that a clear majority of Irish viewers still favour keeping the "Angelus" broadcasts, chimes and all. Its appeal is summarised by one audience member as follows: "To the person of faith, it's a moment of grace; to the person without faith, it's a moment of peace. What's not to like?" The station also notes that the prayer itself is never broadcast, whether in vocal or text form.

The Angelus is broadcast daily on radio in the city of Monterrey, Mexico, at 06:00, 12:00, and 18:00.

In Brazil, radio stations associated with the Catholic Radio Network (Rede Católica de Rádio in Portuguese) broadcast the Angelus daily at 6 p.m.; radio stations that are not affiliated with the network but are run by Catholic personnel also broadcast the prayer at the same hour.

In the Philippines, radio and television stations of the Philippine Catholic Church and some religious orders broadcast the Angelus at 6 a.m., 12, and 6 p.m. PST (GMT+08:00). The devotion is also broadcast over the public address system at noon and 6 p.m. in some shopping malls, and in many Catholic educational institutions at noon on schooldays. Individual parish churches also ring bells at 6 p.m. It was once custom for a family to be home by the evening Angelus, where it is recited kneeling in front of the house altar.

In the United States and Canada, some Catholic radio stations run by laity broadcast the Angelus daily. American Trappist monasteries and convents often combine the Angelus with midday prayers or Vespers and pray them together in the Church. At the Roman Catholic University of Portland, the bell tower near the centre of campus peals the Angelus at noon and 6 p.m.

Slovak Catholic Rádio Lumen broadcasts the Angelus and other prayers daily for 10 minutes at noon. Likewise, TV Lux broadcasts the Angelus regularly.

=== Indulgences ===
The singular prayer of the Angelus grants a partial indulgence. The Raccolta (superseded by the Enchiridion Indulgentiarum in 1968) includes an indulgence for praying the Angelus monthly. It was originally granted by Pope Benedict XIII in 1724 as a plenary indulgence.

=== Papal custom ===
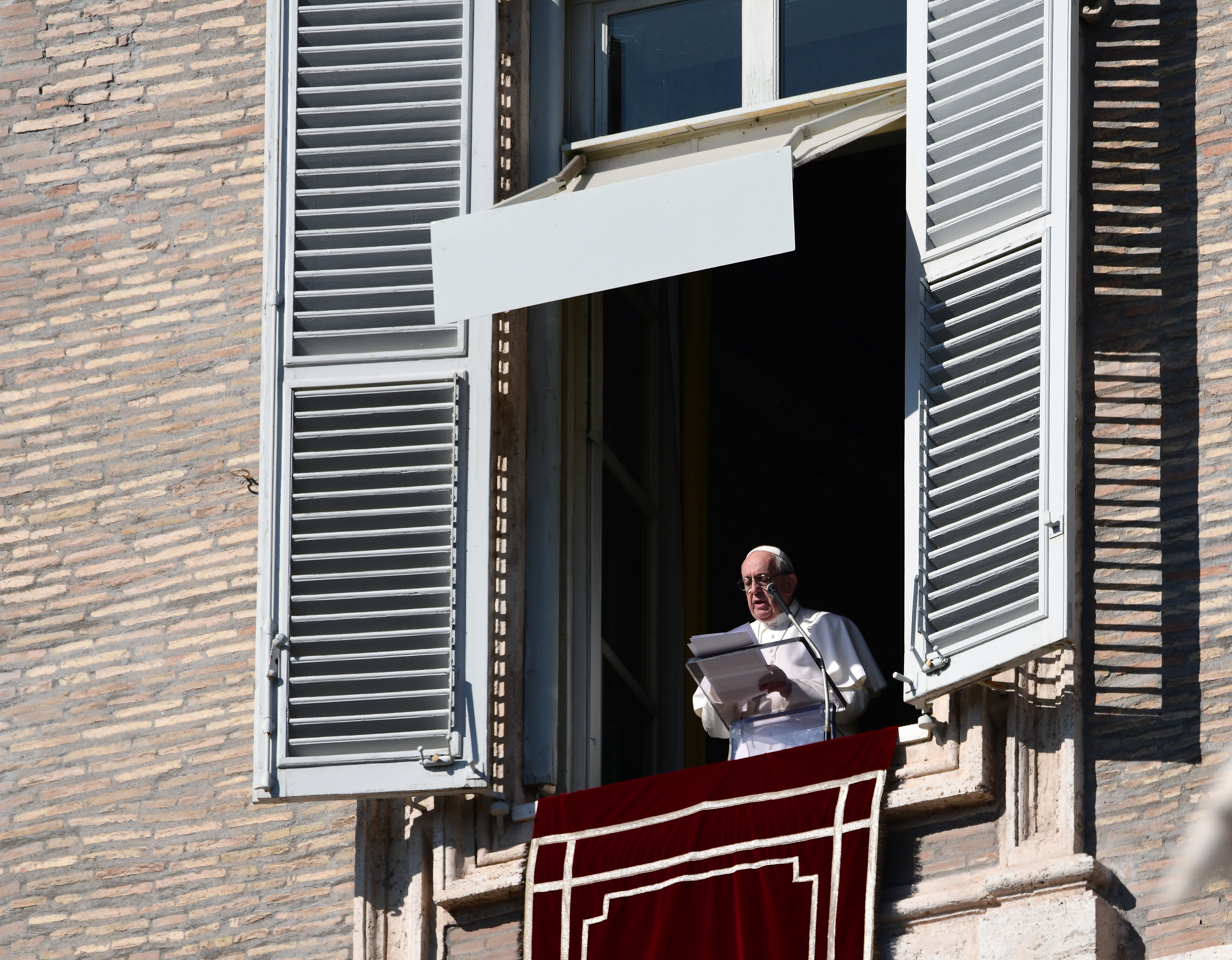
Pope Francis during the Angelus Address in Vatican City, 2018

Known informally as the Angelus Address (Regina Cœli Address during Eastertide), every Sunday at noon, the pope when he is present in Vatican City delivers a brief speech, then leads recitation of the Angelus or Regina Cœli, and concludes with a blessing upon the crowds in Saint Peter's Square and viewers on television. The Address is given on Easter Monday instead of Easter Sunday, and it is also given on Saint Stephen's Day. The prayer is broadcast live at 12 p.m. (Central European Time) on online platforms (Vatican News, with simultaneous interpretation), by public television (Rai 1) and through Eurovision Network.

The custom was instituted by Pope John XXIII in 1959. Pope John XXIII spoke of the Angelus "as a summary of 'the Christian epic' in three books: the divine invitation and initiative; the human response of obedience, fiat; and the result of this obedience, the Word made flesh."

=== Anglican practice ===
The Angelus is found in two popular twentieth-century Anglo-Catholic manuals of devotion. The Practice of Religion: A Short Manual of Instructions and Devotions by Archibald Campbell Knowles, first published in 1908, refers to the Angelus as "the memorial of the Incarnation" and notes that "In the Mystery of the Incarnation we worship and adore Our Lord as God of God, we honour and reverence Saint Mary as 'Blessed among women.' In honouring Mary, the Instrument of the Incarnation, we really honour Christ, Who became Incarnate."

The Angelus is also found in Saint Augustine's Prayer Book: A Book of Devotion for members of the Episcopal Church, first published in 1947 (Revised Edition, 1967).

In many Anglo-Catholic communities of the Anglican Communion, there is a tradition of singing the Angelus, particularly before or after the Sunday parish Mass. The practice has spread more commonly into Roman Catholicism through the Ordinariate jurisdictions for former Anglicans.

== Text ==
Latin

℣. Angelus Domini nuntiavit Mariæ,
℟. Et concepit de Spiritu Sancto.

℣. Ave Maria, gratia plena, Dominus tecum. Benedicta tu in mulieribus, et benedictus fructus ventris tui, Iesus.
℟. Sancta Maria, Mater Dei, ora pro nobis peccatoribus, nunc et in hora mortis nostræ. Amen.

℣. Ecce ancilla Domini.
℟. Fiat mihi secundum verbum tuum.

℣. Ave Maria, gratia plena, Dominus tecum. Benedicta tu in mulieribus, et benedictus fructus ventris tui, Iesus.
℟. Sancta Maria, Mater Dei, ora pro nobis peccatoribus, nunc et in hora mortis nostræ. Amen.

℣. Et Verbum caro factum est.
℟. Et habitavit in nobis.

℣. Ave Maria, gratia plena, Dominus tecum. Benedicta tu in mulieribus, et benedictus fructus ventris tui, Iesus.
℟. Sancta Maria, Mater Dei, ora pro nobis peccatoribus, nunc et in hora mortis nostræ. Amen.

℣. Ora pro nobis, Sancta Dei Genitrix.
℟. Ut digni efficiamur promissionibus Christi.

Oremus.
Gratiam tuam, quæsumus, Domine, mentibus nostris infunde; ut qui, Angelo nuntiante, Christi Filii tui incarnationem cognovimus, per passionem eius et Crucem ad resurrectionis gloriam perducamur. Per eundem Christum Dominum nostrum.
℟: Amen.

English

℣. The Angel of the LORD declared unto Mary,
℟. And she conceived of the Holy Spirit.

℣. Hail Mary, full of grace; the LORD is with thee: blessed art thou amongst women, and blessed is the Fruit of thy womb, Jesus.
℟. Holy Mary, Mother of God, pray for us sinners, now and at the hour of our death.

℣. Behold the handmaid of the LORD.
℟. Be it done unto me according to thy word.

℣. Hail Mary, full of grace; the LORD is with thee: blessed art thou amongst women, and blessed is the Fruit of thy womb, Jesus.
℟. Holy Mary, Mother of God, pray for us sinners, now and at the hour of our death.

℣. And the Word was made flesh.
℟. And dwelt among us.

℣. Hail Mary, full of grace; the LORD is with thee: blessed art thou amongst women, and blessed is the Fruit of thy womb, Jesus.
℟. Holy Mary, Mother of God, pray for us sinners, now and at the hour of our death.

℣. Pray for us, O Holy Mother of God.
℟. That we may be made worthy of the promises of Christ.

Let us pray,
Pour forth, we beseech Thee, O LORD, Thy grace into our hearts; that, we, to whom the Incarnation of Christ, Thy Son, was made known by the message of an angel, may by His Passion and Cross be brought to the glory of His Resurrection. Through the same Christ our Lord.
℟. Amen.

In some places, the Gloria Patri is added, either once or thrice.

℣. Glory be to the Father, and to the Son, and to the Holy Spirit.
℟. As it was in the beginning, is now and ever shall be, world without end. Amen.

In the published Anglican versions of the Angelus, the text of the concluding collect reads:

We beseech Thee, O Lord, pour Thy grace into our hearts; that as we have known the Incarnation of Thy Son, Jesus Christ, by the message of an angel, so by His Cross and Passion we may be brought unto the glory of His Resurrection. Through the same Jesus Christ our Lord.

== Indulgence ==
Pope Benedict XIII on 14 September 1724 added to the recitation of the Angelus the 100-day indulgence for the faithful who recited it on their knees (standing on Saturday evenings and Sundays) at dawn, at midday and at sunset, at the ringing of the bell. Leo XIII (1878-1903) modified, making them easier, the conditions for obtaining the gift of indulgence. Until the reform of indulgences implemented by Pope Paul VI in 1967 was still granted the indulgence of 100 and plenary once a month, provided that he had recited it every day at the three prescribed times of the day (dawn, midday, sunset), and had confessed and communicated.

The Enchiridion Indulgentiarum includes a partial indulgence for the faithful who recite the Angelus in the three prescribed times. As with all indulgences, it is necessary to be in a state of grace; furthermore, the indulgence is applicable to oneself or to the souls of the deceased, but is not applicable to other living people on earth.

== Angelus bell ==
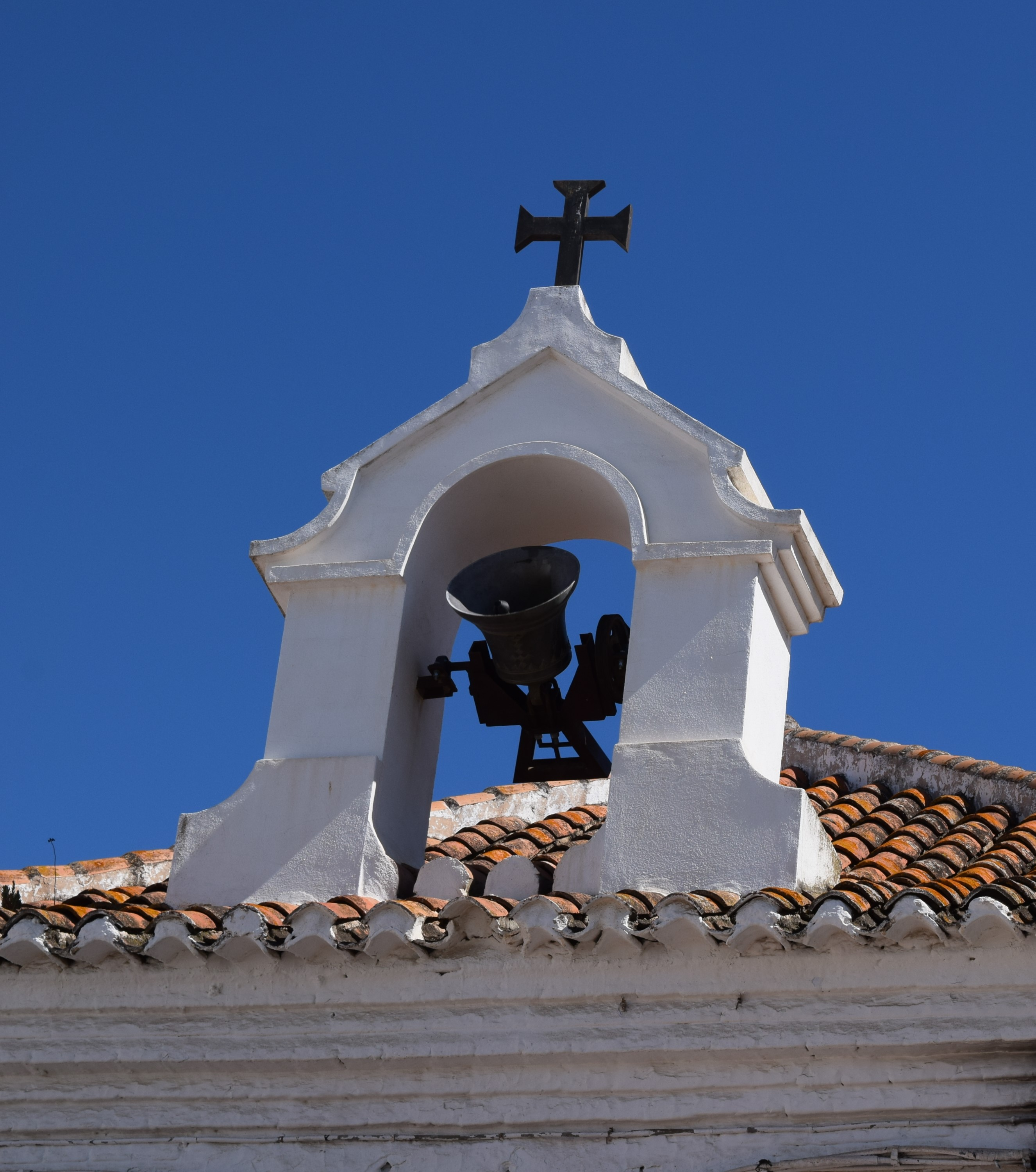
Angelus bell being rung at Ermita de Nuestra Señora de las Angustias

The Angelus, in all its stages of development, was closely associated with the ringing of a church bell. The bell is still rung in some English country churches and has often been mistaken for, and alleged to be a remnant of, the curfew bell. The Angelus bell is not rung on Good Friday and Holy Saturday.

Where the town bell and the bells of the principal church or monastery were distinct, the curfew was generally rung upon the town bell. Where the church bell served for both purposes, the Ave and the curfew were probably rung upon the same bell at different hours.

The ringing of the Angelus in the 14th century and even in the 13th century must have been very general. The number of bells belonging to these two centuries that still survive is relatively low, but a considerable proportion bear inscriptions that suggest that they were originally intended to serve as Ave bells. Such bells bear words like Missi de coelis nomen habeo Gabrielis ("I bear the name of Gabriel sent from heaven") or Missus vero pie Gabriel fert laeta Mariae ("Gabriel the messenger brings joyous tidings to holy Mary").

Bells inscribed with Ave Maria are also numerous in England, but there the Angelus bells seem in a very large number of instances to have been dedicated to St Gabriel, the angel mentioned in the prayer (Luke 1:26–27). In the Diocese of Lincoln alone there are nineteen surviving medieval bells bearing the name of Gabriel, while only six bear the name of Michael, a much more popular patron in other respects.

In France, the Ave Maria seems to have been the ordinary label for Angelus bells; but in Germany the most common inscription of all, even in the case of many bells of the 13th century, is the words O Rex Gloriæ Veni Cum Pace ("O King of Glory, Come with Peace"). In Germany, the Netherlands, and in some parts of France, the Angelus bell was regularly known as the Peace bell, and pro pace schlagen (to toll for peace) was a phrase popularly used for ringing the Angelus.

In Italy, the three recitals of the Angelus are referred to as avemmaria, hence L' avemmaria del giorno, L' avemmaria del mezzo giorno and L' avemmaria della sera. It was customary at one time to calculate hours of the day from the evening Angelus, or avemmaria for short. Hence the origin of the phrase that appears in Leoncavallo's opera Pagliacci: "venti tre ore"' ("the twenty-third hour") refers to one hour before the evening Angelus.

In Slovakia, mainly the noon Angelus was commonly referred to as "na Anjel Pána" (at Angelus), similar to Czech "na Anděl Páně". These terms were also part of their contemporary artistic works.

== Poetry ==
The poem "The Irish Unionist's Farewell" by Sir John Betjeman has the line "and the Angelus is calling".

Francis Bret Harte wrote "The Angelus" referencing the twilight tolling of the Angelus bell at a Californian mission.

Denis Florence MacCarthy's poem "The Bell-Founder" describes the fashioning of Angelus bells.

Angelus is mentioned in Book 11 of Pan Tadeusz by Adam Mickiewicz.

Francis Jammes' most famous collection of poems is the 1897 De l'angélus de l'aube à l'angélus du soir ("From morning Angelus to evening Angelus").

In "The Angelus", Donegal poet Elizabeth Shane portrays an elderly couple cutting peat reminiscent of the scene in Millet's painting.

In a poem set to music circa 1919, "The Foggy Dew", Canon Charles O'Neill (1887–1963) memorialized the Easter Rising also known as the Easter Rebellion of 1916. One of the lines reads: "But the Angelus Bell o'er the Liffey's swell rang out in the foggy dew".

A poem by Edgar Allan Poe, "A Catholic Hymn", and various similar titles in 1835 as part of a short story and again in 1845. Apparently written after hearing the Angelus bells whilst passing a church.

In "The Dry Salvages", T. S. Eliot analogizes a fog bell floating on the ocean to a "perpetual Angelus".

== Music ==
Franz Biebl set the prayer for two men's choirs, called Ave Maria (Angelus Domini), published also in versions for mixed choirs.

== Notes ==
=== Bibliography ===
- Schauerle, Hermann (1967). "Angelus Domini". Lexikon der Marienkunde. Regensburg: Pustet.
