= Veritatem facientes =

Apostolic letter of Pope Pius XII

Veritatem facientes Apostolic letter of Pope Pius XII
- Signature date: March 27, 1952
- Text: In Latin

Veritatem facientes (March 27, 1952) is an apostolic letter of Pope Pius XII to the Catholic faithful of Romania, protesting against their persecution and the virtual eradication of the Catholic Church in their country. The letter asks for courage and prayers.

Seven years after World War II, when Pope Pius XII wrote to the Catholics in Romania, the situation of the Church had changed drastically. The Romanian Greek-Catholic Church was outlawed by government decree on December 1, 1948 and ceased to exist officially. All bishops were incarcerated at the time of the decree; foreign priests were expelled, domestic priests were imprisoned as well. Two of five Roman Catholic dioceses were officially recognized; their bishops were jailed as well. Three dioceses were closed. All Church schools and institutes were closed. As in other countries, the regime in Romania attempted to create a schismatic Catholic Church. The Catholic media were outlawed and closed and all religious houses confiscated and closed as well.

Veritatem Facientes gives an overview of the sufferings and persecutions of the Church in Romania. The Pontiff states that this writing is the only way to reach the faithful of Romania, who had suffered so much in the past few years. It is therefore his obligation to protest and defend the freedom and interests of the Church and its faithful. All bishops are incarcerated or sent away (to Siberia). The Greek-Catholic Church has been declared illegal. Because the Catholic press has been confiscated and outlawed, there is no way to reach the faithful by that way either. With all the Catholic voices silenced, it is rather easy, to rail against the Church as an enemy of the State. Therefore, if the faithful are attacked or persecuted because of their faith, they should view this as an honour, not anything to be ashamed of.

The Pope "would like to kiss the chains of all those who are incarcerated for their faith", knowing that they are more worried about the future of the country and souls, than their own fate and loss of freedom. The Pontiff asks the faithful to gaze to heaven and be aware, that the everlasting light of eternal happiness expects those who are persecuted. He also asks for prayers, so God may grant peace now to the people and nations, that peace which secures freedom, and the freedom of worship and the dignity of every person.

He reminds his Romanian readers that the Church in their country has great saints who went through very difficult trials in their time. The Romanian faithful of today are the direct offspring of these great saints and should follow their great examples. Several times in Romanian history, contacts with the Holy Apostolic See were interrupted, as they are now. But, after some time, relations began to flourish again There will be no shortage of difficulties, jail, loss of property, tortures and more. But it is preferable not to negate one's faith in God. The Pope expresses his hope that many may be able to read his letter and find some comfort in it. May they continue on the path of faith, and receive divine strength in their difficulties. Because God is the centre of the issue, no one should take this easily, or lose courage. The saints, who make up the glory of Romania, will assist together with the blessed Virgin Mary. She will obtain from her son the graces which her children truly need. The Pope and the whole Catholic world will pray with the Romanian Catholics, so Romanians may live in full freedom, publicly and privately confessing their faith. Pope Pius XII concludes his letter with his Apostolic Blessing.
