= Dum maerenti animo =

Apostolic Letter

Dum maerenti animo Apostolic letter of Pope Pius XII
- Signature date: June 29, 1956
- Text: In Latin

Dum maerenti animo (June 29, 1956) is an Apostolic Letter of Pope Pius XII to the faithful in Eastern Europe regarding their persecutions and the persecutions of the Church. "The whole family of Christianity stands in respectful admiration before you, and what you suffer in silence for so long. She prays for God’s mercy. She prays also for those who persecute you."

== Context ==
Pope Pius XII describes a decade of "the most terrible and saddest persecutions" in Eastern Europe. The Church has lost its freedom, Church associations and religious institutes were closed, bishops impeded, or worse, jailed or exiled. The Catholic faithful of both the Latin and Oriental rites are suffering, but the Eastern Church has been forced to disband or unite with the Russian Orthodox Church. All Eastern cardinals, József Mindszenty, Aloysius Stepinac and Stefan Wyszyński are persecuted and jailed for their faith. The apostolic letter reminds of the 500th anniversary of the "Turkish bell" a prayer crusade ordered by his predecessors against the dangers from the East. He asks the faithful throughout the world, to pray for the persecuted Church in the East during the mid-day Angelus.

== Content ==
The letter mentions that some Christians lose courage. Others argue, that the teachings of Christ should be updated, to fit their new realities. Pius calls this the wrong kind of reconciliation. Heaven and earth will disappear before His Word disappears. The Pope encourages to endure the tribulations, even if no contact with him or Church officials are possible. He assures the faithful in Eastern Europe, that all Christianity is full of admiration and united with them in prayer. Finally, he asks them to pray with him for those who persecute them.

== Quotations ==
- Daily we implore God’s powerful support, to strengthen your faith, to reduce your anxieties, to comfort you with heavenly graces. May he bring back the misled members of his mystical body. May he, after quieting of the present turbulence, restore fully his peace, based on truth and justice.
- Our Redeemer never forgets His Church. You know this. He never abandons her. As the waves around the little boat of Peter grow larger, He is awake, even if he appears to sleep. “I am with you every day to the end of time”. But, if He is with us, who is against us? Christ is with you, and will never deny his divine support, if you only ask him.
- Be assured, the whole family of Christianity stands in respectful admiration before you, and what you suffer in silence for so long. She prays for God’s mercy, so you may not fall under the harsh atheistic attacks or the deceitful errors. She prays also for those who persecute you, as the Christian Law of Love requires. May they find forgiveness from Him, who lovingly waits for the return of all His lost sons.
