= Impensiore caritate =

Impensiore Caritate Letter of Pope Pius XII
- Signature date: October 28, 1951
- Text: In Latin

Impensiore caritate (October 28, 1951) is an Apostolic Letter of Pope Pius XII to the persecuted bishops, priests, and faithful of Czechoslovakia.

"With deepest love and affection" Pope Pius writes to those, who face trials and suffering because of their faithfulness to the Church. He is fully aware of their suffering. The Pope continues that Catholic religion is in a position, to unify the country, further its peace and justice, deepen mutual respect and love, guarantee human rights and contribute to its cultural development. But, robbed of its legal rights and freedoms, she cannot fulfil her public and private missions to individuals, families and the general welfare of society.

- We know only too well, that some of your bishops are imprisoned, in concentration camps, arrested in their own homes, or completely surveillanced, and thus unable to carry out their proper missions. In the same miserable condition are hundreds and hundreds of priests, male and female religious, and a large number of lay people, who are seen as enemies of the State.

All they do is to lead a Christian life, an honourable thing to do. Nobody can claim, that Catholics are less perfect or loyal citizen, since there is no imposition from faith, which would limit love and obedience to country. The Pope is mostly concerned with the cunning ways of seducing the young. The damage could be enormous over time. He is also concerned that the Pope is described as an enemy of the people, accused of starting another war, although, he, the Pope works endlessly for peace and reconciliation. Attempts are made in Czechoslovakia, to create a peace-loving renegade Church, separate from Rome.

Faced will all these difficulties, Pope Pius urges his readers to be courageous. These are not the first trials for the faithful in their long history. But their forefathers remained faithful to the Church even in the most trying of times.

- They may take your freedom, mistreat you, despise you publicly, throw you in jail, they may even kill you, but they can never take the Catholic faith from your hearts or besmirch your conscience. They may turn you into martyrs but they can never turn you into traitors of your Christian faith

Pope Pius reviews the great Czechoslovak saints as shining examples of faith and loyalty, the Saints, Saint Adalbert, Saints Cyril and Saint Methodius, and Saint Wenceslaus. He asks for prayers for their intercessions and to the Virgin Mary. May all these prayers give back the full freedom of religion, a freedom which the Church uses to further understanding and progress. May all those now in concentration camps, be allowed to return to their homes and families. May freedom and inner peace and justice return to the whole nation. He, the Pope suffers with them every day. But these trials and pains are accepted by God our Father, who transforms them into a large stream of abundant blessings. The letter closes with the Apostolic blessings to all especially those who suffer persecution for justice.
