= Invicti athletae =

1957 papal encyclical by Pius XII

Invicti athletae Latin for 'Of the unconquered athlete' Encyclical of Pope Pius XII
- Signature date: 16 May 1957
- Subject: Commemorating the 300th anniversary of the martyrdom of St. Andrew Bobola
- Number: 37 of 41 of the pontificate
- Text: In Latin; In English

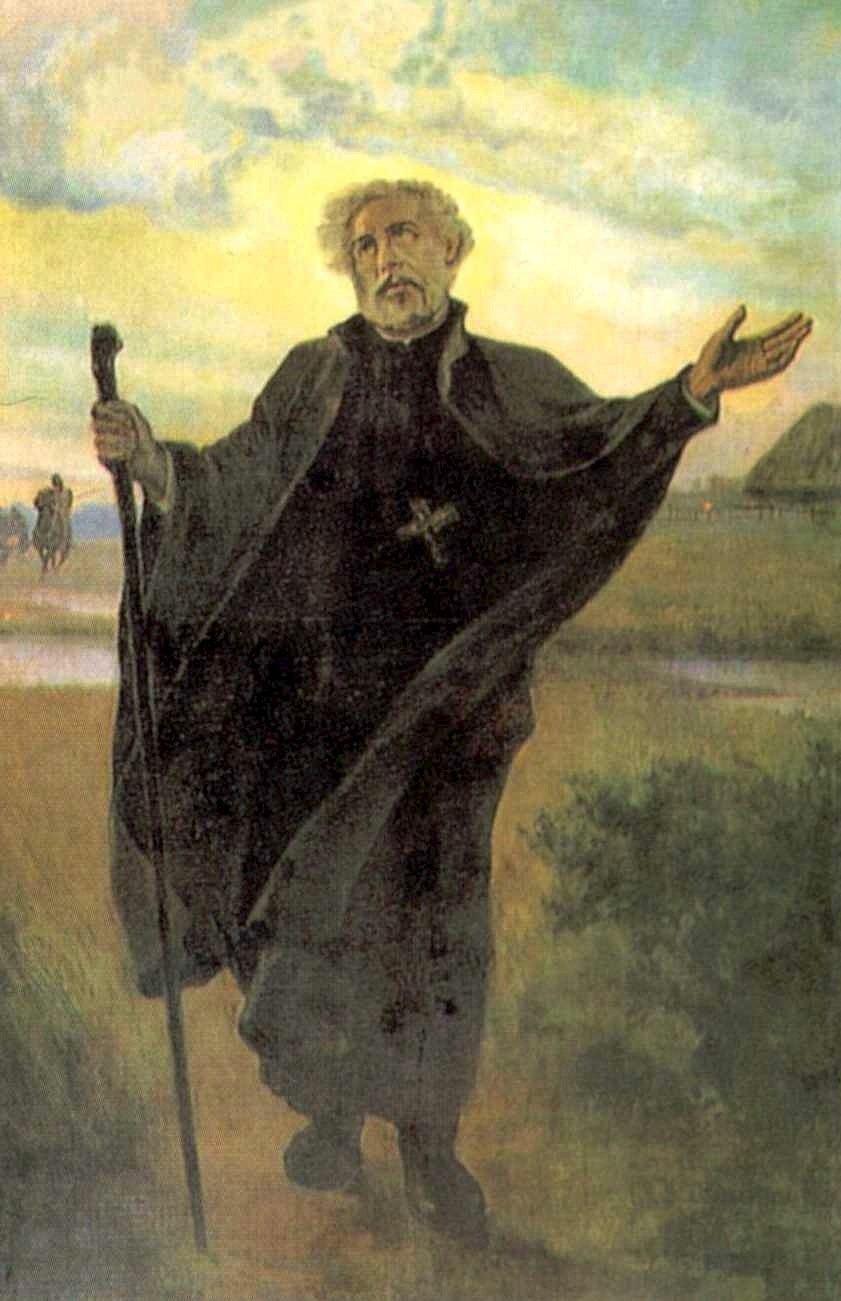
A painting of Saint Andrew Bobola

Invicti athletae (May 16, 1957) is an encyclical of Pope Pius XII to the bishops of the world on the 300th anniversary of the martyrdom of Saint Andrew Bobola.

Some parts of the encyclical are addressed particularly to the Catholics of Poland.

== Background ==
Andrzej or Andrew Bobola was born in 1591 in the Polish–Lithuanian Commonwealth. In 1611 he became a member of the Society of Jesus (the Jesuits) and in 1622 was ordained a priest. He served as an effective preacher and missionary in the Lithuanian part of the Commonwealth, until rebellious Cossacks tortured and killed him, along with other Catholics and Jews in May 1657. Religious veneration of him began 45 years later, when his body was found to be incorrupt. In 1853, Pope Pius IX authorized his beatification and, in 1938, Pope Pius XI canonized him.

== The encyclical ==
Over half of the encyclical is taken up with an account of the life and death of Andrew Bobola.

The encyclical then points to the saint as a model to follow in the circumstances then prevailing in certain places, where the Christian religion was under heavy strain or was being almost annihilated. The places are not specified, but the mentions here and there in the letter suggest that the reference was to countries that had come under Communist rule at the end of Second World War. There the teaching of the Gospel was kept from people, or was subjected to scorn as out of touch with modern endeavours to progress and prosperity. Efforts were under way to eradicate it from minds by promising in its place a happiness and peace that, the encyclical maintained, is impossible if God is excluded.

Those circumstances require on the part of bishops, priests, and laity, a strong effort to defend, explain, and propagate the Catholic religion. The stronger the attacks on Jesus Christ and his Church, the more readily must they uphold the truth in speech, writing, and good example, being prepared to sacrifice time and financial resources when necessary.

Striving for Christian perfection always involves an element of martyrdom, giving witness, if not by shedding one's blood, at least by tenaciously resisting sin and devoting oneself unselfishly to the service of God. Inspiration can be drawn from Andrew Bobola's constancy in faith, and his zeal in defending and spreading it.

Pope Pius XII concluded the encyclical by directing some words in particular to the Polish people, especially to their bishops who had undergone suffering for the sake of Christ. He asked them to hold fast to the faith received from their ancestors, imitating their constancy, and striving to live up to the Christian moral code. He also urged them to act boldly but prudently, knowingly and wisely, and to maintain Catholic faith and unity.

== See also ==
- Anti-religious campaign of Communist Romania
- Polish anti-religious campaign
- Religion in Poland
- Persecution of Christians in Warsaw Pact countries
- League of Militant Atheists
