= Gloriosam Reginam =

Gloriosam Reginam Letter of Pope Pius XII
- Signature date: December 8, 1955
- ASS: 48:73-77

Gloriosam Reginam (December 8, 1955) is a letter of Pope Pius XII to the Polish episcopate, to protest against the persecution of the Church in Poland, and, to commemorate the 300th anniversary of Jasna Góra, the Polish sanctuary of the Virgin Mary. The invincible Mother of God, who the pope says watches over the freedom for Poland, will most certainly assist.

Gloriosam Reginam begins with a review of the historic attachment of the Polish faithful to the Virgin Mary. She in turn was pleased to always assist the Polish people. The larger the difficulties and dangers, the more obvious was her help. In 1655 Protestant invaders from Sweden easily took Warsaw and Kraków, leaving Jasna Góra as the last symbol of Polish freedom. But the Abbot of the monastery, Augustyn Kordecki, did not lose courage, and, appealing to the Mother of God, inspired Polish defenders to extreme resistance. The tide turned and Poland regained its freedom. Consequently, King Kasimir named the Virgin Mary patron and Queen of Poland. Pope Pius XI created a special Polish feast day to the Virgin as Queen of Poland, to be celebrated May 3 of every year. This proves, so Pope Pius, that the virgin can be trusted to save the Polish people at any time. The Catholic faith is the most valuable treasure of the Polish people, a true source of strength in difficult times. Poles, over the centuries stood loyal to the Holy Apostolic See. Poles withstand the subtle and not so subtle advances of atheist propaganda.

- Poles are not afraid in heavy storms. They maintain their calmness, firmness and dignity, trusting in the Most High and Eternal God, to whom nothing is impossible. He subdues in short time and with modest means, everything and everybody powerful and arrogant.

== Persecution ==
All events, including the bad ones experienced at present, are subject to the hidden plans of God. To endure the present calamities, it is necessary to be strong in hope and faith, and, to live publicly and privately, like a reflection of Gospel teachings. Pope Pius suggests to his readers, to look up to the powerful virgin, in case they are afraid. The most blessed Mother will never abandon her faithful and beloved Polish people. The Pope reminds his readers, that he castigated anti-Christian religious persecutions many times before. The persecution got worse, not only in Poland but in other countries too. Priests and Bishops are incarcerated under most awful circumstances, or they are under house arrest, unable to be pastorally active. Religious were forced to leave their houses, Catholic organizations were dissolved, all Catholic media closed, Catholic schools closed or robbed of their rights.

- We paternally hug all these brothers and sons of ours, so dear to us, because they suffer innocently for truth and justice, and once again we recommend them and all their intentions most ardently to our Lord God, the most generous source of consolation and eternal rewards.

In the following part, Pope Pius XII critiques some unnamed Polish clergy, for meddling in affairs, which are none of their business, and for giving sermons and press releases, which are misleading, as they are based on wrong principles and false teachings. He reminds his readers, that he led worldwide protests against the incarceration of Cardinal Stefan Wyszyński two years earlier. Many countries living in freedom joined in his protest. But Polish bishops are still incarcerated or kept from their offices. The invincible Mother of God who watches over the freedom for Poland, will most certainly assist. The Pope concludes, it is most justified, to memorialize her and thank her for the liberation from the most terrible occupation. Pope Pius XII concludes his letter with his best wishes to Poles all over the world, and his Apostolic Blessing.

== Sources ==
- Gloriosam Reginam, Acta Apostolicae Sedis, AAS 1956, 73
