= Cum Jam Lustri =

1951 Apostolic Letter of Pope Pius XII

Cum Jam Lustri Apostolic letter of Pope Pius XII
- Signature date: 1 September 1951
- Subject: Sufferings of the Polish people during Stalinist persecution

Cum Jam Lustri is an apostolic letter of Pope Pius XII, dated September 1, 1951, to the bishops "and brave people" of Poland about their sufferings during Stalinist persecution. He asks for prayers to the Virgin Mary, because she will not deny her help to the Polish people, who dedicated themselves to her protection.

The letter expresses Papal condolences to the death of Cardinal August Hlond of Warsaw, who formed the face of the resurrected Poland and sacrificed his life for his country, the Church and the Representative of Christ. The Pope also mourns the death Adam Stefan Sapieha Cardinal Archbishop of Kraków, who provided strong, courageous leadership during the terrible years of German occupation. Strengthening his fatherland and the Church, he was never timid despite all the persecutions. He took care of his people. Sapieha was like a firmly rooted tree, growing next to a river, his very existence an encouragement not only for Poland but for all of Christianity.

Knowing how much Poland venerates the Blessed Mother, the Pope expresses his sadness that so many Polish bishops were not allowed to be in Rome during the proclamation of the Dogma of the Assumption, November 1, 1950. He is so much aware, that no other country has such an ardent love for the mother of the Lord. She will not deny her help to the Polish people, who dedicated themselves to her protection. He prays for her miraculous assistance and reminds, that Polish soldiers fought near the Basilica della Santa Casa in Loreto to save her house during the war. Polish soldiers also celebrated a Holy Mass in her honour, in smouldering ruins after the battle of Monte Cassino. The struggle continues. But, Pope Pius XII is sure, the Virgin Mary will help, as the high minded Polish people continue to trust in her and confidently hope for a better future.

== Sources ==
- Acta Apostolicae Sedis, Roma, Vaticano, 1939,1951
