= Decennium dum expletur =

Cupimus imprimis Letter of Pope Pius XII
- Signature date: 1 September 1949
- Text: In Latin

Decenium dum expletur (1 September 1949) is a letter of Pope Pius XII to the bishops of Poland about the suffering of the Polish People.

== Content ==
The Pontiff describes his peace policies before World War Two, aimed at avoidance of the war. "Nothing is lost with peace, everything may be lost with war". We tried everything with all means at our disposal to prevent the taking up of arms and to seek an honourable solution for all sides.

"Who is able to even enumerate the sufferings of the Polish people during the long years of subjugation, the incredible loss of several million of its population, perished in the war, as consequences of war activities and in concentration camps. The enormous number of those who suffered, were injured, the great destruction of the economy, the many illegal measures of the occupiers. We see with our spirit the devastation of your country, the endless number of refugees and displaced persons, who lost their homes. Our ears still hear the sobbing of mothers and women, who mourn their beloved fallen, the lonely moaning of the aged and sick, without any assistance, the whimpering of the little ones, left by themselves, without any protection, the cries of the wounded and the death rattles of the dying."

The Pope continues, that, while the German occupation and war have ended, the Church has not regained its rightful freedom, which is lamentable, in light of her many assistances to the Polish nation during the war. The time of persecution is not over. He reminds the bishops on the glorious Polish history, rich with heroism but also with pain and suffering. But in thousand years of Christianity, the Polish people never became unfaithful to Jesus Christ and his Church. He hopes that the many Polish sacrifices will eventually lead to the peace of Christ and material well being for this great nation. He concludes with his Apostolic Blessing "to this great nation, which We love so dearly".
