= In Poloniae annalibus =

In Poloniae annalibus Letter of Pope Pius XII
- Signature date: October 28, 1951
- Text: In Latin

In Poloniae annalibus (July 16, 1953) is a letter of Pope Pius XII commemorating the seven hundredth anniversary of the canonization of Saint Stanislaus and encouraging the Polish episcopate to be united and strong in the face of persecution.

== Content ==
According to the letter, Saint Stanislaw was an example of steadfastness in his time and is a model for our time. As bishop of Kraków, he was a model for piety, social engagement and courage. He dared to tell King Boleslaw his faults and sin in his face. He was tortured as a result but his mind did not bend. The Kraków faithful were so enraged over this sacrilege that they forced the king to abdicate. He went into exile for the rest of his life.

Pope Pius XII reviews Polish history in order to show how Polish loyalty and faith, following the example of Stanislaw, was always victorious. Saint Stanislaw thus is not only a saint of virtue but of justice as well. And the Poles, who were divided at the time unified around the relics of the great saint. He admonishes the episcopate to maintain the same unity.

== Sources ==
- In Poloniae annalibus, Acta Apostolicae Sedis, AAS, 1953, 498
