= Ecclesiastical letter =

Catholic letters from synods, popes and bishops

Ecclesiastical letters are publications or announcements of the organs of Roman Catholic ecclesiastical authority, e.g. the synods, but more particularly of pope and bishops, addressed to the faithful in the form of letters.

== Letters of the popes in the early church ==
The popes began early to issue canon laws as well for the entire Church as for individuals, in the form of letters which popes sent either on their own initiative or when application was made to them by synods, bishops or individual Christians.

Apart from the Epistles of the Apostle Peter, the first example of this is the Letter of Pope Clement I (90–99) to the Corinthians, in whose community there was grave dissension. Only a few papal letters of the first three Christian centuries have been preserved in whole or part, or are known from the works of ecclesiastical writers. Among them are three letters by Pope Cornelius. From the moment the Church was recognized by the Roman State and could freely spread, the number of papal letters increased.

The popes called these letters with reference to their legal character, decreta, statuta, decretalia constituta, even when the letters were often hortatory in form. Or the letters were called sententiæ, i. e. opinions; præcepta; auctoritates. On the other hand, more general letters, especially those of dogmatic importance, were also called at times tomi; indiculi; commonitoria; epistolae tractoriæ, or simply tractatoriæ.

If the matter were important, the popes issued the letters not by their sole authority, but with the advice of the Roman presbyters or of a synod. Although these names indicate sufficiently the legal character of the papal letters, the popes repeatedly required from the persons to whom they wrote that these should bring the letter in question to the notice of others. In order to secure such knowledge of the papal laws, several copies of the papal letters were occasionally made and dispatched at the same time.

Following the example of the Roman emperors, the popes soon established archives (scrinium) in which copies of their letters were placed as memorials for further use, and as proofs of authenticity. The first mention of papal archives is found in the Acts of a synod held about 370 under Pope Damasus I. Pope Zosimus also makes mention in 419 of the archives. Nevertheless, forged papal letters appeared even earlier than this. But by far the greater number of the papal letters of the first millennium have been lost.

As befitted their legal importance, the papal letters were also soon incorporated in the collections of canon law. The first to collect the epistles of the popes in a systematic and comprehensive manner was the monk Dionysius Exiguus, at the beginning of the sixth century. In this way the papal letters took rank with the canons of the synods as of equal value and of equal obligation. The example of Dionysius was followed afterwards by almost all compilers of the canons, such as Anselm of Lucca.

== Letters of the medieval popes ==
With the development of the papal primacy in the Middle Ages the papal letters grew enormously in number. The popes, following the earlier custom, insisted that their rescripts, issued for individual cases, should be observed in all analogous ones. According to the teaching of the canonists, above all of Gratian, every papal letter of general character was authoritative for the entire Church without further notification. Decrees (decreta) was the name given especially to general ordinances issued with the advice of the cardinals. On the other hand, ordinances issued for individual cases were called rescripta. Thus a (papal) constitution was always understood to be a papal ordinance which regulated ecclesiastical conditions of a general character judicially, in a durable manner and form, for all time; but by a rescript was understood a papal ordinance issued at the petition of an individual that decided a lawsuit or granted a favour.

The above-mentioned distinctions between papal documents were based on the extent of their authority. Other names again had their origin in the form of the papal documents. It is true they all had more or less evidently the form of letters. But essential differences appeared, especially in regard to the literary form (stylus) of the document and the method of sealing, these depending in each case on the importance of the contents of the respective document. It was merely the difference in the manner of sealing that led to the distinction between bulls and briefs. For papal bulls, legal instruments almost entirely for important matters, the seal was stamped in wax or lead, seldom in gold, enclosed in a case, and fastened to the document by a cord. For briefs, instruments used as a rule in matters of less importance, the seal was stamped upon the document in wax. Curial letters (litterae curiales or litterae de curia) denoted particularly letters of the popes in political affairs.

During the Middle Ages, the letters of the popes were deposited in the papal archives either in the original or by copy. They are still in existence, and almost complete in number, from the time of Innocent III (1198–1216). Many papal letters were also incorporated, as their legal nature required, in the Corpus Juris Canonici. Others are to be found in the formularies, many of which appeared unofficially in the Middle Ages, similar in kind to the ancient official Liber Diurnus of the papal chancery in use as late as the time of Gregory VII. The papal letters were forwarded by the papal officials, above all by the Apostolic Chancery, for whose use the chancery rules, regulae cancellariae Apostolicae, were drawn up with regard to the execution and dispatch of the papal letters, dating back to the twelfth century. Nevertheless, the forging of papal letters was even more frequent in the Middle Ages than in the early Church. Innocent III refers to no less than nine methods of falsification. From the thirteenth century on to January 1909, it sufficed, in order to give a papal document legal force, to post it up at Rome on the doors of St. Peter's, of the Lateran, the Apostolic Chancery and in the Piazza del Campo di Fiori, but since 1909 they acquired force only by publication in the Acta Apostolicae Sedis.

== Letters of the popes in modern times ==
In the modern period also, papal letters have been constantly issued, but they proceed from the popes themselves less frequently than in the Middle Ages and Christian antiquity; most of them are issued by the papal officials, of whom there is a greater number than in the Middle Ages, and to whom have been granted large delegated powers, which include the issuing of letters. Following the example of Paul III, Pius IV and Pius V, Sixtus V by the papal bull Immensa aeterni of 22 January 1587 added to the already existing bodies of papal officials a number of congregations of cardinals with clearly defined powers of administration and jurisdiction. Succeeding popes added other congregations.

Pius X, in the constitution Sapienti consilio of 29 June 1908, reorganized the papal curia, papal writings being divided into (apostolic) constitutions, (papal) rescripts, (papal) bulls, (papal) briefs and apostolic letters (litterae apostolicae).

The litterae apostolicae are further divided into litterae apostolicae simplices or brevetti, chirographa, encyclicae (encyclicals) and motus proprii. By litterae apostolicae simplices are understood all documents drawn up by virtue of papal authorization, and signed with the pope's name but not by the pope personally. Documents signed by the pope personally are called chirographa. Encyclicals are letters of a more hortatory nature, addressed to all or to a majority of the higher officials of the Church. A motu proprio is a document prepared at the personal initiative of the pope, without previous petition to him, and issued with a partial avoidance of the otherwise customary forms of the chancery.

By "constitution" is understood, as in the Middle Ages, a papal document of general authority; by "rescript", a similar document applicable to an individual case.

Bulls and briefs are distinguished from each other by characteristics of form which have always remained essentially the same.

The papal documents are still deposited in the Roman archives. There are no official collections of them corresponding to the medieval Corpus Juris Canonici. The last official collection is that of the Constitutions of Benedict XIV (1740–1758). From the sixteenth century, on the other hand, private collections have appeared, some of which are called bullaria, from the more important part of their contents. Many papal letters are also found in the collections of the Acts of the Councils. The documents issued by the officials of the Curia and the Congregations of Cardinals contain either resolutions (decisions) for individual cases, or declarations (extensivae or comprehensivae) interpreting laws, or decrees, which are entirely new laws. Some congregations of cardinals have issued official collections of their decisions.

The document Sapienti Consilio of Pope Pius X decreed that all papal laws were to be promulgated through publication in an official bulletin called the Acta Apostolicae Sedis, the first issues of which, at intervals of about twice a month, appeared in 1909. From 1865 to 1908, papal documents had been published in a similar series under the title Acta Sanctae Sedis, which was declared official in 1904. Before 1865, papal documents were not systematically published in documentary fashion and were promulgated by other means such as being affixed to the doors of basilicas in Rome.

== Letters of bishops ==
Just as the popes rule the Church largely by means of letters, so also the bishops make use of letters for the administration of their dioceses. The documents issued by a bishop are divided according to their form into: pastoral letters, synodal and diocesan statutes, mandates or ordinances or decrees. The classification depending upon whether they have been drawn up more as letters, or have been issued by a synod or the diocesan chancery.

Pastoral letters are addressed either to all the members of the diocese (litterae pastorales) or only to the clergy, in this case formerly in Latin (litterae encyclicae). Bishops' letters to their ordained clergy are often referred to as Ad Clerum letters. The mandates, decrees or ordinances are issued either by the bishop himself or by one of his officials.

The synodal statutes are ordinances issued by the bishop at the diocesan synod, with the advice, but in no way with the legislative co-operation, of the diocesan clergy. The diocesan statutes, regularly speaking, are those episcopal ordinances which, because they refer to more weighty matters, are prepared with the obligatory or facultative co-operation of the cathedral chapter.

In order to have legal force the episcopal documents must be published in a suitable manner and according to usage. Civil laws by which episcopal and also papal documents have to receive the approval of the State before they can be published are irrational and out of date according to the First Vatican Council (session III, De eccles., c. iii) (see Exequatur).

== See also ==
- Regesta
- Papal bull
- Audi filia et
