= The General: The Gibraltar Assassination =

- Polish: Generał. Zamach na Gibraltarze
- Directed by: Anna Jadowska
- Written by: Anna Jadowska
- Produced by: TVN, Wiertnicza
- Starring: Krzysztof Pieczynski
- Cinematography: Marek Gajczak & Robert Halas
- Edited by: Robert Ciodyk PSM
- Music by: Contemporary Noise Quintet, Robert Ciodyk
- Distributed by: ITI Group
- Release date: April 3, 2009
- Country: Poland
- Language: Polish

The General: The Gibraltar Assassination (Polish: Generał. Zamach na Gibraltarze) is a Polish historical film, based on the last days of General Władysław Sikorski during World War II. It was released in 2009; it was directed by Anna Jadowska; Krzysztof Pieczynski plays General Sikorski.

It focuses on the controversial 1943 Gibraltar B-24 crash in which Sikorski died.

== Cast ==
- Krzysztof Pieczyński as General Władysław Sikorski
- Kamila Baar as Zofia Leśniowska, Sikorski's daughter
- Jerzy Grałek as Governor Noel Mason-Macfarlane
- Tomasz Sobczak as Jan Gralewski
- Marieta Żukowska as Alicja Iwańska
- Łukasz Simlat as Zygmnut Biały
- Mirosław Haniszewski as Capitan Edward Prchal
- Piotr Miazga as Major William S. Herring
- Marcin Bosak as Ensign Józef Ponikiewski
- Ireneusz Czop as Perry
