= Władysław Sikorski's death controversy =

Conspiracy theories

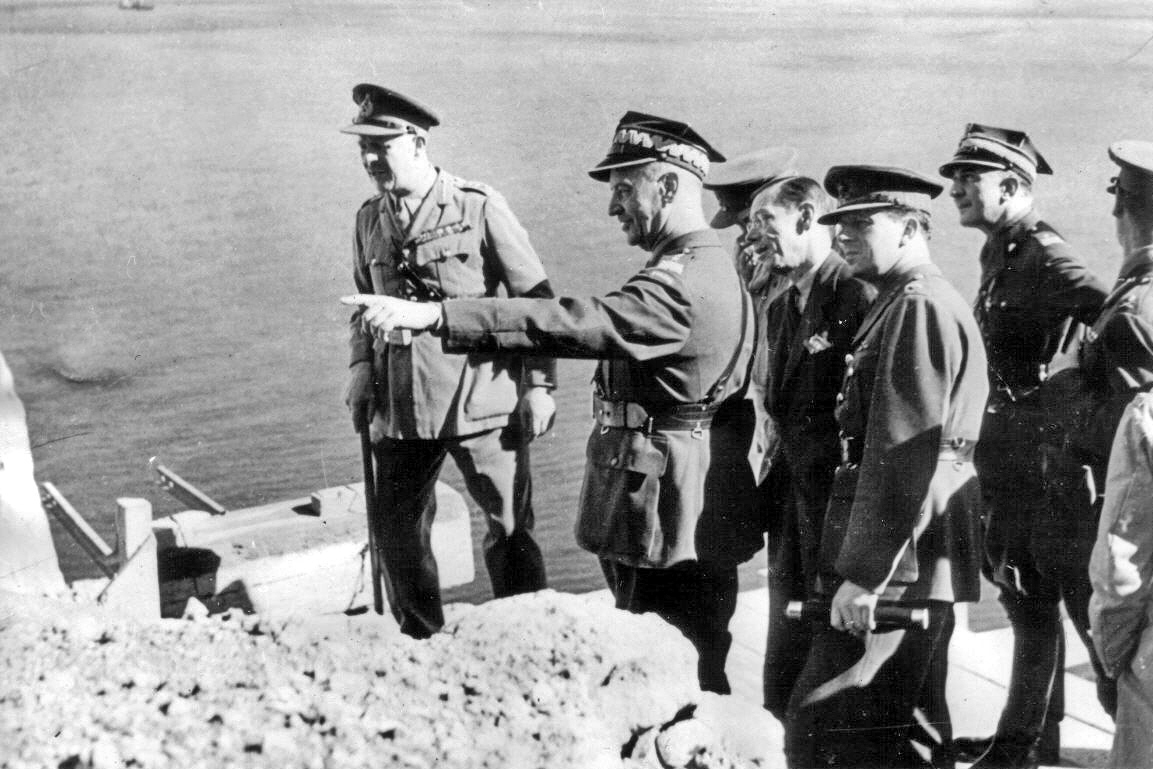
Sikorski with General Mason-Macfarlane [on left] Józef Retinger and Colonel Victor Cazalet [behind] on a Gibraltar visit before the 1943 crash.

Władysław Sikorski's death controversy revolves around the death of the commander-in-chief of the Polish Army and Prime Minister of the Polish government in exile, General Władysław Sikorski, in the 1943 B-24 crash in Gibraltar. Sikorski's Liberator II crashed off Gibraltar almost immediately after takeoff, with the plane's pilot being the only survivor.

The catastrophe, while officially classified as an accident, has led to several conspiracy theories that persist to this day, and often propose that the crash was an assassination, which has variously been blamed as a German, Soviet, British and even Polish conspiracy.

The incident is still described by some historians as mysterious and was investigated by the Polish Institute of National Remembrance. They concluded that the injuries sustained were consistent with a plane crash and that there was not enough evidence to support or reject the theory that the plane was deliberately sabotaged.

== Air crash ==
Sikorski's Liberator, lying on its back in the sea just off Gibraltar following the crash

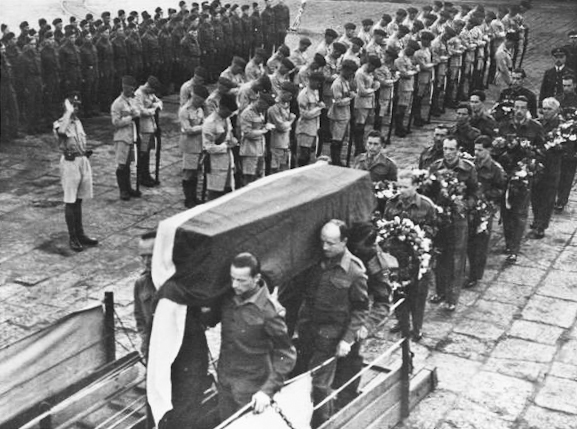
Sikorski's body being carried onto a ship at the Gibraltar Naval Base after his funeral

In late May 1943, Sikorski went to inspect Polish forces stationed in the Middle East. He was inspecting the forces and raising morale of the Polish troops there. He was also occupied with political matters; around that time, a conflict was growing between him and general Władysław Anders. The main reason for this was that Sikorski was still open to some normalization of Polish-Soviet relations, to which Anders vehemently objected.

On 4 July 1943, while returning from the Middle East, Sikorski perished, together with his daughter Zofia, his Chief of Staff, Tadeusz Klimecki, and seven others, when his aircraft, a Consolidated Liberator II, serial number AL523, crashed into the sea 16 seconds after takeoff from Gibraltar Airport at 23:07 hours.

=== Passengers and crew ===
The only survivor of the accident was the pilot Flight Lieutenant Eduard Prchal, one of six crew on the aircraft. The 11 passengers killed were:

- General Władysław Sikorski – commander-in-chief of the Polish Army and Prime Minister of the Polish government in exile
- Major General Tadeusz Klimecki – Polish Army Chief of General Staff
- Brigadier John Percival Whiteley OBE – Conservative Party Member of Parliament for Buckingham
- Colonel Victor Cazalet MC – British liaison officer to the Polish forces and Conservative Member of Parliament for Chippenham
- Colonel Andrzej Marecki – Polish Army Chief of Operations
- Jan Gralewski – an Armia Krajowa courier
- Lieutenant Józef Ponikiewski, Polish Navy who was Sikorski's adjutant
- Warrant Telegraphist Harry Pinder, Royal Navy – Chief of the Royal Navy signals station in Alexandria
- Adam Kułakowski – Sikorski's adjutant
- Zofia Leśniowska – Sikorski's daughter and secretary
- Walter Heathcote Lock – Ministry of Transport representative in the Persian Gulf.

== Official investigations ==
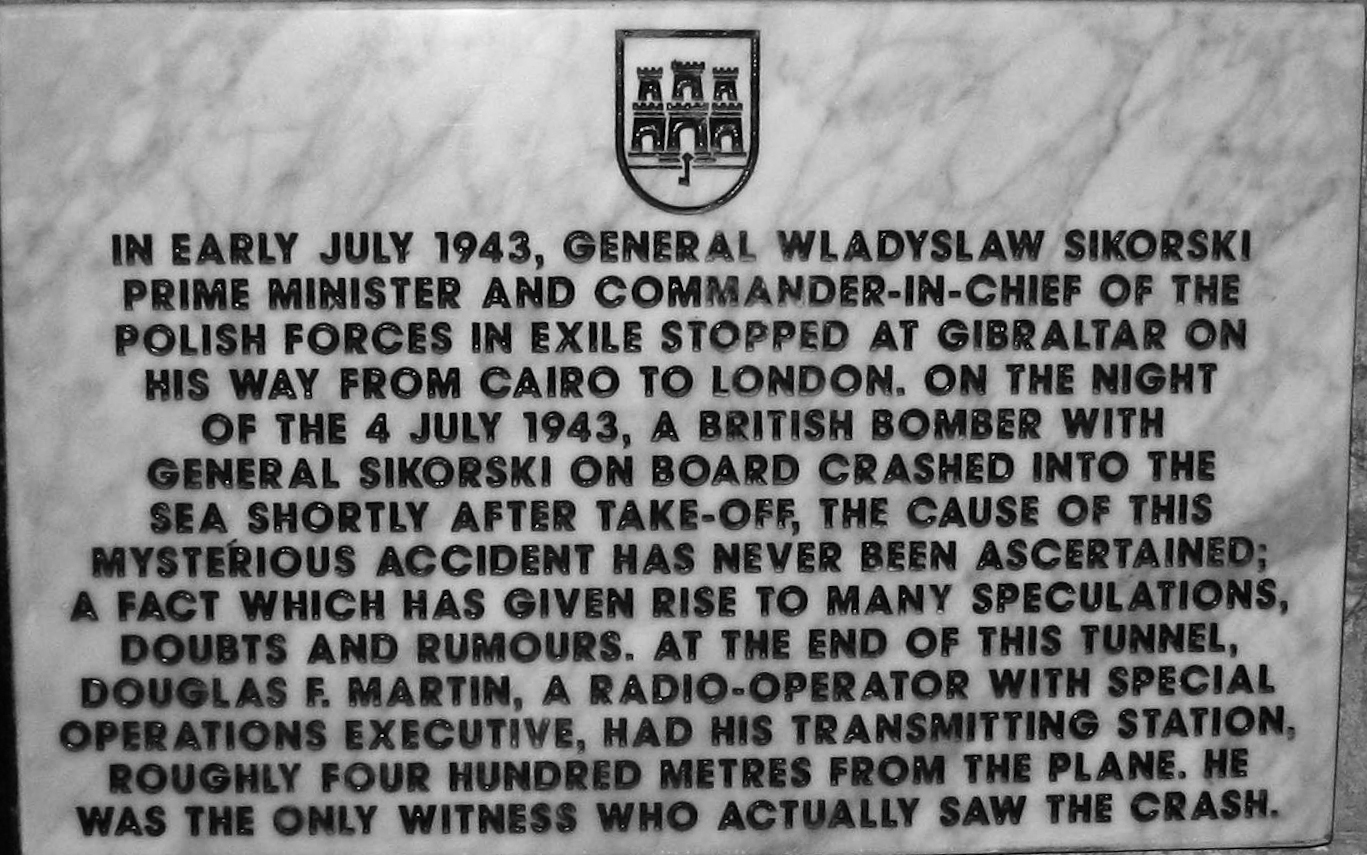
Memorial plaque dedicated to Sikorski located at the end of the Great Siege Tunnels in Gibraltar. The plaque notes that "the cause of this mysterious accident has never been ascertained; a fact which has given rise to many speculations, doubts and rumours."

A British Court of Inquiry convened on 7 July that year investigated the crash of Sikorski's Liberator II serial AL 523, but was unable to determine the cause, finding only that it was an accident and "due to jamming of elevator controls", noting that "it has not been possible to determine how the jamming occurred but it has been established that there was no sabotage." The Polish government refused to endorse the report, due to the contradiction about the cause not being determined but sabotage being ruled out, and pursued its own investigation, which suggested that the cause of the accident cannot be easily determined. The political context of the event, coupled with a variety of circumstances, immediately gave rise to much speculation that Sikorski's death had been no accident, and may have been the direct result of a German, Soviet, British, or even Polish conspiracy.

In 2008, the Polish Institute of National Remembrance (IPN) began an official inquiry into the incident. Sikorski was exhumed and his remains were examined by Polish scientists, who in 2009 concluded that he died due to injuries consistent with an air crash and that there was no evidence that Sikorski was murdered, ruling out theories that he was shot or strangled before the incident; however, they did not rule out the possibility of sabotage. In 2013 one of the IPN historians, Maciej Korkuć, has stated that "many facts suggest an assassination", although another, Andrzej Chwalba, notes that there is insufficient evidence to support this claim. He also complains that some British and Spanish documents still remain classified, hindering the investigation. The Polish investigation ended in 2013 with the conclusion that deliberate tampering to the aircraft could be neither confirmed nor ruled out.

According to a popular belief in Poland, British documents concerning the accident will not be declassified until 2050. However, in 1998, the Public Record Office officially informed the Polish government that they had no knowledge of any classified British documents older than 30 years concerning Sikorski's death. According to information from the Foreign Office in 2005, all documents concerning Sikorski's death are available in The National Archives. Additionally, in 2004, Special Intelligence Service archive was made available for research for Polish historians, which brought no new facts. Polish historian Jacek Tebinka claimed in 2023 that the amount of available documents from this case is very large and the British no longer classify documents related to the matter.

As Roman Wapiński noted in his biographical entry on Sikorski in the Polish Biographical Dictionary in 1997, as no conclusive evidence of any wrongdoing has been found, Sikorski's death remains officially classified as an accident. The unresolved questions surrounding his death have led to a number of articles being published in the historical and mainstream press, both in Poland and abroad, questioning these findings. However, Polish historian Andrzej Garlicki, building on a similar argument by historian Marian Kukiel, stated in 2009 that without any evidence all conspiracy theories about Sikorski's death are irresponsible fiction.

== Conspiracy theories ==
The earliest suggestions of a conspiracy was popularized by Nazi propaganda which suggested that Sikorski's death was the result of a British–Soviet conspiracy. Some modern sources still note that the accident is not fully explained; for example, Jerzy Jan Lerski, in his Historical Dictionary of Poland (1996) entry on the "Gibraltar, Catastrophe of", notes that "there are several theories explaining the event, but the mystery was never fully solved."

For example, there has been uncertainty since the day of the crash about who boarded the plane and about the exact cargo manifest—all leading to uncertainty as to the identity of the bodies recovered from the crash site; some bodies, including that of Sikorski's daughter, Zofia, were never recovered. Since several bodies were never found and the bodies of several members of Sikorski's entourage were never positively identified, some conspiracy theorists such as journalist and amateur historian Dariusz Baliszewski postulate that some might have been murdered on the ground while others might have been abducted to the Soviet Union.

Baliszewski and Tadeusz Kisielewski are among those who focus on the opportunity the Soviets had at Gibraltar. At about the same time that Sikorski's plane was left unguarded at the Gibraltar airfield, a Soviet plane was parked nearby; it carried Soviet ambassador Ivan Maisky, giving the Soviets an officially confirmed presence at the site of the accident. The head of the British Secret Intelligence Service's counterintelligence for the Iberian Peninsula from 1941 to 1944 was Kim Philby, a Soviet double agent, who would eventually defect in 1963. Before 1941, Philby had served as an instructor with the Special Operations Executive, an organization specializing in sabotage and diversion behind enemy lines.

Among the rumoured kidnap victims, a prominent role is given to Sikorski's daughter, Zofia Leśniowska, who was reported in 1945 to have been spotted in a Soviet Gulag by a member of the elite Polish commandos (Cichociemni), Tadeusz Kobyliński. Kobyliński attempted in 1945 or 1946 to gather Armia Krajowa personnel for a mission to rescue Leśniowska.

Another controversy surrounds the sole survivor of the flight, a Czech officer, Eduard Prchal. Prchal, like many pilots who did not wish to tempt fate, was known for never wearing his Mae West life jacket—but on this occasion, when rescued from the sea, he was wearing one. During the inquiry, he denied this, and later blamed the inconsistency on post-crash shock affecting his actions and memory—essentially, on amnesia. Later, he explained that he must have instinctively put the vest on when he realised the plane was in trouble. Polish aviation expert Jerzy Maryniaki created a simulation of the crash, in which he concluded that the plane must have been under control up until the very moment of the crash. Kisielewski argues that the plane was likely under the control of the second pilot, who died in the crash.

Other conspiracy theories point to the British, the German Abwehr intelligence agency or the Poles themselves, some of whom (especially under the command of Anders) had shown animosity toward Sikorski for, at least from their point of view, his policy of "colluding" with Soviet leader Joseph Stalin, which reached new heights by the Germans' April 1943 discovery of mass graves filled with thousands of Polish prisoners of war murdered by the Soviets at Katyn Forest in 1940. In 1967, David Irving published a book dedicated to the crash, in which he suggested British complicity in the incident. Irving's book highlighted what he believed were two other suspicious occasions where assassination attempts may have been made on Silorski during aerial flight, including a crash-landing in Montreal in 1942, where sabotage was a suspected cause. Irving's method and selective use of sources have been the subject of significant criticism.

In his book Disasters in the Air, former KLM pilot and one-time IFALPA president Jan Bartelski, of Polish origin, suggests that the crash of the Liberator that carried Sikorski was caused by a half-empty mail bag jammed between the horizontal stabilizer and the elevator, thus "freezing" the controls and preventing Prchal from gaining altitude after takeoff. The mail bag was in the cargo compartment and was blown out of the aircraft through the side hatch (which in normally configured Liberators would have served to protect the machine gun position) by a strong airflow rushing through the nose gear door.

== In popular culture ==
The crash of Sikorski's Liberator is portrayed in the 1958 film The Silent Enemy, in which the team of Royal Navy divers charged with retrieving Sikorski's briefcase from the wrecked aircraft is led by Lionel "Buster" Crabb, himself later to disappear in 1956 in mysterious circumstances while diving in the vicinity of a visiting Soviet warship.

In 1968, the play Soldiers: An Obituary for Geneva by German writer Rolf Hochhuth debuted in London. The play partially drew on the work of David Irving and contained the sensational allegation that Winston Churchill was involved in plotting Sikorski's death. In Hochhuth's play, the plane is internationally sabotaged and Sikorski and the other passengers are murdered by axe-wielding commandos. Hochhuth, unaware that the plane's pilot Eduard Prchal was still alive, accused him of participating in the plot. Prchal won a libel case that seriously affected the London theatre which staged the play. Hochhuth never paid the £50,000 damages which the court ordered him to pay and subsequently avoided returning to the UK. In 2011, he revealed his source for Churchill's involvement as Jane Ledig-Rowohlt, the British wife of his publisher Heinrich Maria Ledig-Rowohlt (née Jane Scatcherd). According to Hochhuth's biographer Birgit Lahann, these rumours relayed by Jane Ledig-Rowohlt had been the sole source for the allegations in the play.

In 2009, a Polish film, Generał. Zamach na Gibraltarze was filmed; the film focused on a plot to assassinate Sikorski.

== See also ==
- 2010 Polish Air Force Tu-154 crash, airplane disaster that led to the death of Polish president Lech Kaczyński and other Polish dignitaries, which resulted in several conspiracy theories being spread
- Death and state funeral of Muhammad Zia-ul-Haq, another leader who died in a plane crash where investigations by two different states came to different conclusions, and where there are multiple actors theorized to have been responsible
- List of unsolved deaths
