= Alicja Iwańska =

Polish sociologist (1918–1996)

- Iwańska in Mexico, c. 1955–1965
- Born: 13 May 1918; Gardzienice estate, near Lublin, Regency Kingdom of Poland
- Died: 26 September 1996 (aged 78); London, England
- Other name: Alicia Iwanska
- Citizenship: Poland; United States
- Occupations: Resistance fighter; academic; writer
- Years active: 1940–1996
- Spouses: Jan Gralewski (m. 1942; died 1943); Philip Wagner (m. 1957)
- Awards: Kościelski Award (1974)

Alicja Iwańska (also known as Alicia Iwanska; 13 May 1918 – 26 September 1996) was a Polish sociologist, academic and writer. Born into the landed gentry of Poland, her family were members of the intelligentsia and encouraged Iwańska to pursue her literary dreams. She began publishing poetry in 1935 in various literary journals. After her high school studies, she enrolled in philosophy courses at the University of Warsaw and went on to study for a master's degree. When World War II broke out, she joined the resistance movement and served as a courier. Involved in the 1944 Warsaw Uprising, at the end of the war she became part of the secret anti-communist opposition. When arrests began involving the underground movement, Iwańska was forced to flee to the United States in 1948, where she reluctantly applied for asylum.

With little proficiency in English, Iwańska initially had difficulty in adjusting. She enrolled at Columbia University to complete her PhD studies, but would not finish her degree until 1957. Unable to secure a professorship, she took several short contracts, working at traditionally black colleges in the segregated South such as Atlanta University and Talladega College. There she lectured on the similarities between political, religious, and racial persecution in Europe and segregation restrictions in the United States. In 1954, she moved to the University of Chicago and began studying with the American anthropologist Sol Tax. Eager to travel to Mexico to conduct research, in 1957 she married and became a naturalized citizen of the United States. Her work with the Mazahua people earned her recognition as a sociologist by UNESCO and eventually led to a professorship at the State University of New York at Albany in 1965, where she worked until her retirement in 1985.

Having never felt at ease in the United States, that year Iwańska moved to London, where she began a period of intense literary creation. In 1989, she was honored with the knight's cross of the Order of Polonia Restituta. Diagnosed with lung cancer in 1996, she wrote her final memoir about the British health care system. Because her scientific work was written in English and her literary output was written in Polish, her legacy suffered from compartmentalization. Recent scholarship has sought to examine both aspects of her career and recover her contributions to anthropology as well as her literature.

== Early life ==
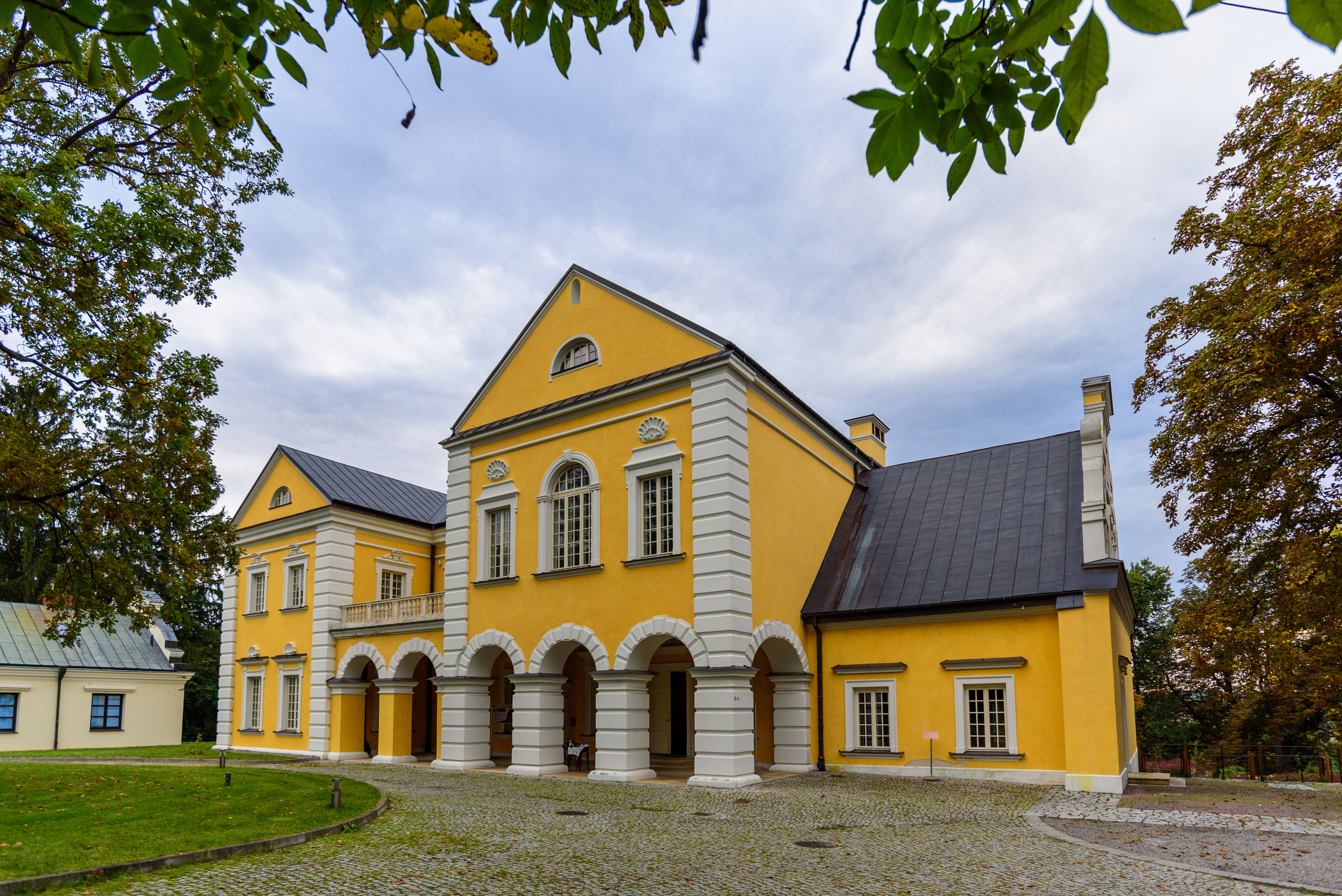
Manor house on the Gardzienice estate

Alicja Iwańska was born on 13 May 1918 into the landed gentry on the Gardzienice estate, near Lublin, to Stanisława Stachna (née Miłkowska) and Jan Iwański. The origin of her ancestry is unknown, with family stories indicating that the first ancestor, Jan Kante Iwański, came to Tarnów as either a worker in the forest estate of the Sanguszko family, a prisoner of war, or a Russian political refugee. Burial records indicate that the family were petty nobility and bore the Jastrzębiec coat of arms. Her grandfather August Iwański had significant property holdings in Ukraine, but purchased the estate in the Lublin Voivodeship and relocated his family to evade border unrest during World War I and the Greater Poland Uprising. Iwańska was born on the estate, but when the turmoil reached them at Gardzienice, they sold the property and moved west to the village of Mikorzyna, near Poznań.

Iwańska's father had previously been widowed and then divorced his second wife. His third marriage to Iwańska's mother created controversy, partly because of his reputation as a bohemian and womanizer but also because of the 19-year difference in their ages. His lavish life, which often exceeded his means, and his disputes with the local clergy forced the family to relocate to Rzetnia. That move was traumatic for Iwańska and for the remainder of her life she believed she was destined to be a wanderer. Her parents' home was a haven for intellectuals and often the meeting place for the Skamandrites, particularly as her father's cousin Jarosław Iwaszkiewicz was part of the experimental poets' group and her mother was a poet. When Iwańska began to show an interest in writing, her father consulted with poet Julian Tuwim to improve her skill.

After beginning her high school education at the Gimnazjum Generałowej Zamoyskiej (General Zamoyski Gymnasium) in Poznań, Iwańska soon transferred to the Gimnazjum Posselt-Szachtmajerowej (Posselt-Szachtmajerowa Gymnasium) in Warsaw. The more liberal Warsaw school was better suited to her temperament, leading to her matriculation in the mid-1930s. Following her poetic debut of 1935, published in the Okolica Poetów (Poets' Area) literary magazine, she quickly began publishing in other literary journals, including Akcja Literacka (Literary Action) and Kamenie (Stones). In 1936, she enrolled at the University of Warsaw to study philosophy under Tadeusz Kotarbiński, a Polish ethicist and philosopher. In the midst of her studies, while traveling on a train to Brussels for research on a master's degree, Iwańska met Jan Gralewski, who was also a student at the University of Warsaw on his way to study in Paris. Her trip abroad made her aware of the rising nationalism spreading across Europe, as well as the anti-Semitic and anti-Catholic sentiment of the times, though she was in fact an atheist. She returned to Poland just before the beginning of the war and in 1938, published a volume of poems Wielokąty (Polygons).

== Career ==
=== Polish resistance ===
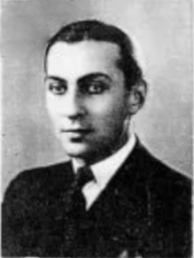
Jan Gralewski, circa 1943

Aware that war was coming, Iwańska went to visit her family and construct a cache for necessities that might be needed during the conflict. She then returned to Warsaw, where she joined the resistance organization Związek Walki Zbrojnej (Union of Armed Struggle). Working with Wanda Piłsudska, a friend from her gymnasium days, Iwańska, code named "Squirrel", worked as a courier. She also delivered messages from prisoners held at Pawiak prison to their families. In the spring of 1940, she again met Gralewski, who was also a resistance fighter, code named "Pankrac", and the two began a romance. She worked the Warsaw-Kraków route with Wanda Namysłowska, while he worked as a courier on foreign routes, creating dispatches in Western Europe for the Polish government in exile. On 18 January 1942 the two married, though she did not take his name. In 1943, Gralewski died, along with Władysław Sikorski, in a controversial airplane crash, though the information was kept from Iwańska. She participated in the Warsaw Uprising in 1944 and at the end of the war became part of the secret anti-communist opposition. She moved to Poznan in 1945 and began working as the literary director of Głos Wielkopolski (The Voice of Greater Poland). When arrests began to reach the underground movement, Iwańska was ordered to leave by her superiors. Thanks to the influence of an uncle, she earned a scholarship to study in the United States and left Poland in 1948.

=== Academics ===
Arriving in the United States with very poor English and uncertain whether she wanted to stay, Iwańska hesitated to apply for asylum but eventually did so when friends warned her she had been named in investigations. Her hearings, during the era of McCarthyism, dragged on for years before asylum was finally granted. She enrolled in a PhD program at Columbia University and while still working on her thesis was hired to teach in the sociology department at Atlanta University in 1952. The school was a traditionally black college in the segregated South. Iwańska felt at home there, lecturing on similarities between political, religious, and racial persecution in Europe and the situation in the United States. When her contract expired, she was offered a post at Talladega College in Alabama. The Ku Klux Klan were active and all faculty and students at the university were barred from interacting with the community. Her atheism clashed with the religious university staff and her contract was terminated in 1954.

Iwańska moved to Chicago, Illinois, that summer and began working for the Slavic Peoples' Project, a Yale University-Pentagon initiative that focused on preserving Czechoslovak and Polish culture. While working on the project, she met the geographer Philip Wagner, who often traveled to Mexico for his work. While working at the University of Chicago, she went to Washington state to analyze rural conditions. Presented to the American Anthropological Association in 1957, her report contrasted the differences between the treatment of Mexican seasonal workers and European peasant farmers. She concluded that Americans did not have the same historic ties to their land, viewing it as a mechanism for profit. Finally completing her PhD that year, she married Wagner. Eager to travel with him and forbidden to do so because of her status as an asylee, Iwańska became a naturalized citizen.

The pair went to Mexico and there Iwańska, whose creative voice had suffered in the United States, began writing literature again. She was charmed by the culture, finding it more compatible with her European upbringing. She began collaborating with the American anthropologist Sol Tax, studied the Mazahua people, and was one of the first to publish details of the civic-religious system of duties employed to maintain order in their society. Some of her most important work was written during this period. Works like The Mexican Indian: Image and Identity and The Truths of Others: An Essay on Nativistic Intellectuals in Mexico questioned the duality of indigenous people's treatment in the larger society, noting that while the government ideology officially celebrated their culture and artworks as part of the unique Mexican identity, they experienced racism from the public. Gaining recognition from UNESCO as a sociological expert, she was sent to train in Chile and Paris, France, but became frustrated with the international bureaucracy. Her reputation earned her an assistant professorship at the State University of New York at Albany in 1965, where her work, over the next two decades, focused mostly on immigrants and emigrants in American history.

In 1968, Iwańska published Świat przetłumaczony (The Translated World), a fictitious account which was based on her work in Mexico. In the book, she compared the Spanish conquest of Mexico to the Nazi occupation and Soviet-backed Communist government in Poland. Her scientific treatment of the subject Purgatory and Utopia: A Mazahua Indian Village of Mexico was published in 1971. The book consolidated much of her previous work, examining the Mazahua's view of themselves, the organization of their society, their value systems, and their view of the wider world. It also included a statement presenting the Mazahua's outlook in their own words. Iwańska interviewed the villagers, wrote down their accounts, then read them back to the community for verification and modification.

In 1973, Iwańska was one of those interviewed for the British Thames Television series The World at War which described events during the Warsaw Uprising. She was awarded the Kościelski Prize in 1974. In the 1980s, Iwańska was called upon to speak on the Solidarity Movement of Poland. She examined governments in exile in her 1981 publication, Exiled Governments. In the study, she looked at Polish and Spanish diaspora communities and how the various layers — core members, proven loyalists, and people with national ties — unite to sway international policy, also covering the perception of exiles living abroad. In 1985, she took early retirement and moved to London.

=== Literary return ===
In London, Iwańska focused on writing fictional works and her memoirs. She also worked at the Polish University Abroad, where she enjoyed teaching Polish students. Having never been able to find her creative voice in English, her literary output during this period was prolific, as she wrote in Polish. In 1987, she published Niezdemobilizowani (Non-demobilized), a fictionalized account of the post-war anti-communist underground. In the book she postulated that Gralewski's death was part of an assassination plot and that he was shot, rather than killed in a plane crash. The following year she published Baśń amerykańska (American Fairy Tale), a polemic commentary on the U.S. academic community. She returned to Poland for the first time in 1989 and was honored with the knight's cross of the Order of Polonia Restituta. Returning to London, she worked on Wojenne odcinki (War Episodes, 1990), presenting the letters she exchanged with Jan Gralewski from 1940 to 1943; a volume of poetry, Niektóre (Some, 1991); Właśnie tu! (Right Here, 1992), a biography of Jean-Marie Guyau and an autobiographical comparison to herself; and Potyczki i przymierza (Skirmishes and Covenants), a diary covering the period from 1918 to 1985.

In 1995, she published Kobiety z firmy (Women from the company), which followed the stories of five women who worked with her in the intelligence service during the Warsaw Uprising. The following year, she published Tylko trzynaście (Only Thirteen), a volume of short stories, and received confirmation that her book Powroty (Returns) about her return to Poland in 1989 was accepted for publication by Gebethner i Ska. Experiencing health problems, Iwańska was diagnosed with lung cancer, the same genetic disease which had afflicted her mother. While she was in hospice care, she wrote her final memoir Szpitale (Hospital), a commentary on the British health care system.

== Death and legacy ==
Iwańska died on 26 September 1996 in London, and her friend Danuta Hiż published Szpitale as a tribute to her memory in the journal Kultura, published by the Kultura Literary Institute Association of Paris. Posthumously, her doctoral thesis, which included interviews conducted between 1951 and 1952 with members of the Polish intelligentsia was published as Polish Intelligentsia in Nazi Concentration Camps and American Exile: A Study of Values in Crisis Situations in 1998.

There is a street named in Iwańska's honor in the "Literary Estate" section of the suburb of Strzeszyn, Poznań. Her correspondence with Sol Tax, which provides "rich documentation" on her career is housed at the University of Chicago Library in the Sol Tax Papers collection, and her correspondence with Margaret Mead is held in the Library of Congress. In 2009, Iwańska was portrayed by Marieta Żukowska in the film, Generał. Zamach na Gibraltarze. In 2015, Columbia University and the New School for Social Research hosted a seminar focused on the work of Iwańska, examining not only her career trajectory as an academic, but also her work as an author. In 2019, Grażyna Kubica-Heller of Jagiellonian University presented a paper Strong authorial 'I' and feminist sensitivity – two Polish women-anthropologists in British and American academia at the International Union of Anthropological and Ethnological Sciences Congress. The paper evaluated why Iwańska and Maria Czaplicka's contributions to anthropology were forgotten for decades and how re-imaging history in a feminist perspective has recovered their works.

== Selected works ==
=== Scientific works ===
- Iwańska, Alicja (1958). Good Fortune: Second Chance Community. Bulletin #589. Pullman, Washington: State College of Washington, Agricultural Experiment Station. OCLC 17788400.
- Iwańska, Alicja (1963). "New Knowledge: The impact of school upon traditional structure of a Mexican village". Sociologus. 13 (13). Berlin, Germany: Duncker & Humblot: 137–150. ISSN 0038-0377. JSTOR 43644115. OCLC 883036851.
- Iwańska, Alicja (1964). "The Mexican Indian: Image and Identity". Journal of Inter-American Studies. 6 (4). Miami, Florida: University of Miami: 529–536. doi:10.2307/165002. ISSN 0885-3118. JSTOR 165002.
- Iwańska, Alicja (1965). "The Impact of Agricultural Reform on a Mexican Indian Village". Sociologus. 15 (15). Berlin, Germany: Duncker & Humblot: 54–67. ISSN 0038-0377. JSTOR 43644162. OCLC 883038609.
- Iwańska, Alicja (1966). "Division of Labor among Men and Women in a Mazahua Indian Village of Central Mexico". Sociologus. 16 (16). Berlin, Germany: Duncker & Humblot: 173–186. ISSN 0038-0377. JSTOR 43644977. OCLC 883021496.
- Iwańska, Alicja (1967). "Mazahua Purgatory: Symbol of Permanent Hope". América Indígena. 37 (1). Mexico City, Mexico: National Autonomous University of Mexico: 91–100. ISSN 0185-1179. OCLC 751385798.
- Iwańska, Alicja (1971). Purgatory and Utopia: A Mazahua Indian Village of Mexico. Cambridge, Massachusetts: Schenkman Publishing Company. OCLC 974659876.
- Iwańska, Alicja (1972). Purgatorio y utopía: una aldea de los indígenas mazahuias. Sep Setentas (in Spanish). Vol. 41. Mexico City, Mexico: Secretaría de Educación Pública. OCLC 249305742.
- Iwańska, Alicja (1977). The Truths of Others: An Essay on Nativistic Intellectuals in Mexico. Cambridge, Massachusetts: Schenkman Publishing Company. OCLC 253803872.
- Iwańska, Alicja (1981). Exiled governments: Spanish and Polish: An Essay in Political Sociology. Cambridge, Massachusetts: Schenkman Publishing Company. ISBN 978-0-870-73553-0.
- Iwańska, Alicja (1998). Polish Intelligentsia in Nazi Concentration Camps and American Exile: A Study of Values in Crisis Situations. Lewiston, New York: Edwin Mellen Press. ISBN 978-0-773-48388-0.

=== Literature ===
- Iwańska, Alicja (1938). Wielokąty (in Polish). Warsaw, Poland: F. Hoesicka. OCLC 836726555.
- Iwańska, Alicja (1968). Świat przetłumaczony (in Polish). Paris, France: Kultura Literary Institute Association. OCLC 384247.
- Iwańska, Alicja (1980). Karnawały (in Polish). London, England: Oficyna Poetów i Malarzy. OCLC 10459230.
- Iwańska, Alicja (1983). Ucieczki (in Polish). London, England: Polska Fundacja Kulturalna. ISBN 978-0-850-65118-8.
- Iwańska, Alicja (1987). Niezdemobilizowani: (Poznań - Warszawa 1945-1946) (in Polish). Warsaw, Poland: Wydawnictwo Głos. OCLC 297586901.
- Iwańska, Alicja (1988). Baśń amerykańska (in Polish). London, England: Aneks. ISBN 978-0-906-60150-1.
- Iwańska, Alicja; Gralewski, Jan (1990). Iwańska, Alicja (ed.). Wojenne odcinki: (Warszawa 1940-1943) (in Polish) (2 ed.). Warsaw, Poland: Oficyna Wydawnicza. ISBN 978-8-385-08304-7.
- Iwańska, Alicja (1992). Właśnie tu!: rzecz o dziewiȩtnastowiecznym Jean Marie Guyau i dwudziestowiecznej sobie samej (in Polish). London, England: Polska Fundacja Kulturalna. ISBN 978-0-850-65280-2.
- Iwańska, Alicja (1993). Potyczki i przymierza: pamiętnik 1918-1985 (in Polish) (1 ed.). Warsaw, Poland: Gebethner i Ska. ISBN 978-8-385-20533-3.
- Iwańska, Alicja (1995). Kobiety z firmy: sylwetki pięciu kobiet z AK pracujących w wywiadzie i kontrwywiadzie (in Polish). London, England: Polska Fundacja Kulturalna. ISBN 978-0-850-65311-3.
