= Rookie (2010 TV series) =

Polish crime television series

- Genre: Crime
- Written by: Karolina Frankowska
- Directed by: Tomasz Szafrański
- Starring: Justyna Schneider; Marcin Bosak; Małgorzata Kożuchowska; Andrzej Nejman; Piotr Grabowski; Szymon Bobrowski
- Composers: Paprika Sound Factory; Paweł Derentowicz; Aleksandr Maksimov
- Country of origin: Poland
- Original language: Polish
- No. of seasons: 1
- No. of episodes: 13

Production
- Producers: Anna Kapusta; Anna Waśniewska-Gill
- Editor: Marek Król
- Running time: 45 minutes

Original release
- Release: 11 March – 10 June 2010

Rookie (Polish: Nowa, lit.: "new") is a Polish crime television series directed by Tomasz Szafrański, written by Karolina Frankowska, and produced by Anna Kapusta and Anna Waśniewska-Gill. It aired on TVP2 from 11 March 2010 to 10 June 2010, and has 13 episodes in total, each with a running time of 45 minutes.

== Synopsis ==
Ada Mielcarz (Justyna Schneider) is a young police officer who begins working in the police headquarters in Warsaw, Poland. There, she is assigned to the partner of commissioner Maciej Wolski (Marcin Bosak), who at first is not interested in working with her. Over time, they develop romantic feelings towards each other.

== Cast and characters ==
- Justyna Schneider as Ada Mielcarz
- Marcin Bosak as Maciej Wolski
- Małgorzata Kożuchowska as Paulina Barska
- Andrzej Nejman as Eryk Lemański
- Piotr Grabowski as Piotr Szuba
- Anna Czartoryska-Niemczycka as Ewa Kalita
- Szymon Bobrowski as Andrzej Radwan

== Production ==
The series was directed by Tomasz Szafrański, written by Karolina Frankowska, and produced by Anna Kapusta and Anna Waśniewska-Gill. The cinematography was done by Artur Żurawski, editing by Marek Król, music by Paprika Sound Factory, Paweł Derentowicz, and Aleksandr Maksimov, and scenography by Janusz Mazurczak and Dorota Palmowska. It was produced by Telewizja Polska. The series aired on TVP2 from 11 March 2010 to 10 June 2010, and has 13 episodes in total, each with a running time of 45 minutes.
