= Women's Volunteer Service =

Women's Volunteer Service could refer to one of several organisations:

- The Women’s Royal Voluntary Service, known until 1966 as the Women's Voluntary Service
- The Women's Volunteer Services (World War II Poland)
- The Women's Volunteer Service Corps (World War II Canada)
