= Soldiers (play) =

1967 play of Rolf Hochhuth

- Written by: Rolf Hochhuth
- Subject: World War II

Premiere
- Place: 1968

Soldiers: An Obituary for Geneva (Soldaten. Nekrolog auf Genf) is a 1967 play by Rolf Hochhuth which makes unverified claims about an attempt by Winston Churchill to appease Joseph Stalin. It alleges that he was involved in the murder of the Polish Prime Minister, General Władysław Sikorski, in an airplane crash in 1943.

German writer Rolf Hochhuth wrote the play on the occasion of the 100th anniversary of the First Geneva Convention, alleging that Churchill condoned the murder of Sikorski in order to appease Stalin, and also highlighting Churchill's support for the mass bombing of German cities in 1943. The play was intended to be premiered by Britain's National Theatre Company in 1967, but this was cancelled and the play was produced instead in the West End with John Colicos as Churchill. In her review for The Spectator in December 1968, Hilary Spurling accused Hochhuth of distorting Sikorski's real politics to make the "intrinsically implausible case, that Churchill murdered Sikorski" thus implying for unclear reasons that Churchill "preferred to deal with Sikorski's infinitely more intransigent successors" over the location of the post-war Polish border.

Hochhuth, unaware that the plane's pilot Eduard Prchal was still alive, accused him of participating in the plot. Prchal won a libel case that seriously affected the London theatre which staged the play. Hochhuth never paid the £50,000 imposed on him by the court and subsequently avoided returning to the UK. In 2011, he revealed his source for Churchill's involvement as Jane Ledig-Rowohlt, the British wife of his publisher Heinrich Maria Ledig-Rowohlt (née Jane Scatcherd). According to Hochhuth's biographer Birgit Lahan, these rumours relayed by Jane Ledig-Rowohlt had been the sole source for the allegations in the play.

The play was profiled in the William Goldman book The Season: A Candid Look at Broadway.

== See also ==
- Władysław Sikorski's death controversy
