= Jan Gralewski =

Polish philosopher, essayist, and soldier (1912–1943)

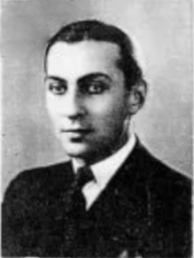
Passport photo, Jan Gralewski, circa 1943

Jan Gralewski (3 March 1912 – 4 July 1943) was a Polish philosopher, essayist and soldier. Member of Polish resistance (Home Army) during World War II, he died in the controversial 1943 Gibraltar B-24 crash.

== Life ==
Gralewski was born on 3 March 1912 in Warsaw. He graduated from the University of Warsaw's philosophy department where he studied under Władysław Tatarkiewicz. He researched topics related to philosophy and literary theory, publishing several articles and essays on those topics even before graduating the university. Before World War II he published some essays in Arkady and Życie Sztuki. He continued writing and publishing during the war, while at the same time joining Polish resistance (ZWZ, Home Army) where he became a courier travelling between the occupied Poland and the Polish government in exile in the West. He was also involved in the underground education initiatives. In 1942 he married poet and scholar Alicja Iwańska, then also a resistance member.

== Death and remembrance ==
On 4 July 1943, Gralewski most likely died in the 1943 Gibraltar B-24 crash, together with the Polish Prime Minister and commander-in-chief, Władysław Sikorski. Due to the controversy surrounding Sikorski's death, some conspiracy theories surrounding this incident have raised questions regarding the role and fate of Gralewski in this incident, with suggestions by historians Dariusz Baliszewski and Tadeusz Kisielewski that he might have been shot by an assassin, and died ashore, not in the airplane crash, and that the assassin entered the airplane acting as his doppelganger. His wife, who after the war became a sociologist in the United States, wrote about her belief that he was murdered as a part of an assassination plot in her 1987 book Niezdemobilizowani. In late 2000s and early 2010s the Polish Institute of National Remembrance considered exhumation of Gralewski's body to address this issue, but eventually decided against it.

Gralewski's and his wife's war time diary was published in 1982 in Poland as Wojenne odcinki. Warszawa 1940–1943.
