= Andrzej Marecki =

Polish military officer (1898–1943)

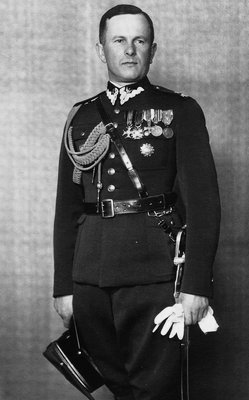
Andrzej Marecki

Andrzej Marecki (2 September 1898 – 4 July 1943) was a Polish military officer. He was a colonel in the Polish Army, lecturer in tactics and member of the Polish General Staff during World War II. He died in the controversial 1943 Gibraltar B-24 crash.

== Biography ==
Andrzej Marecki was born on 2 September 1898. He participated in the Polish–Soviet War of 1918–1921. In the years 1924–1926 he studied in the Wyższa Szkoła Wojenna (Polish Military Academy). After graduating, from 1928 he was a lecturer in tactics at his alma mater. In the years 1934–1936 he served with the 27th Regiment of Light Artillery. From February 1936 he was a military attaché at the Polish diplomatic mission in Stockholm. In February 1939 he was attached to the Polish General Staff. Following Polish defeat after the German and Soviet invasion of Poland, he made his way through Romania to France, where he joined the recreated Polish Army in France. He taught a Polish course at the École Supérieure de Guerre, and later became a Polish liaison officer at the French General Staff. In May 1940 he was attached once again to the Polish General Staff. He was also the first commandant of the Wyższa Szkoła Wojenna, temporarily recreated in the United Kingdom during wartime, and he was involved with the re-establishing of Polish military journal Bellona in the United Kingdom during that time frame.

He died in the controversial 1943 Gibraltar B-24 crash on 4 July 1943. Sikorski was the Polish Army and Prime Minister of the Polish government in exile. The catastrophe, while officially classified as an accident, has led to several conspiracy theories that persist to this day, and often propose that the crash was an assassination, which has variously been blamed on the Soviets, British, Nazis or even a dissenting Polish faction.

== Remembrance ==
As part of an investigation into the death of Władysław Sikorski, one of the victims of the B-24 crash, which was undertaken in the 2000s by the Institute of National Remembrance in Poland, the bodies of crash victims Tadeusz Klimecki, Andrzej Marecki, and Józef Ponikiewski were exhumed from their resting place in Newark, United Kingdom, on 3 December 2010. The remains were flown to Warsaw, and then taken to the Department of Forensic Medicine in Kraków for examination. On 9 December 2010, Tadeusz Klimecki and Andrzej Marecki were re-buried in the Powązki Military Cemetery in Warsaw.

== Awards ==
Marecki was a recipient of:

- Virtuti Militari, 5th class
- Gold Cross of Merit
