= Ewa Miszewska =

Ewa Zofia Miszewska
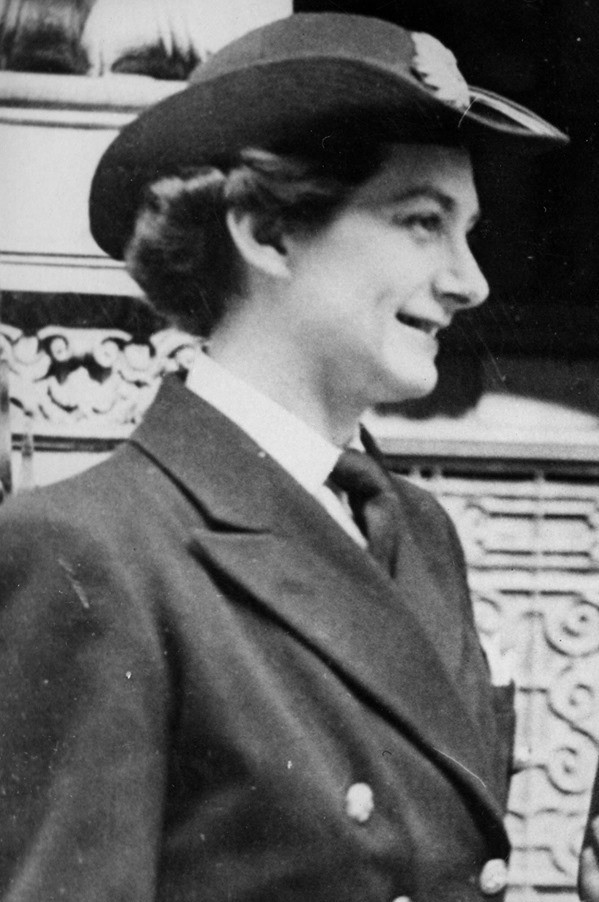
- Born: 1917
- Died: 1972 (aged 54–55)
- Military career
- Allegiance: Poland
- Branch: Polish Navy
- Service years: ? - 1946
- Rank: Lieutenant Commander (młodsza inspektorka)
- Nickname: Capitana Polaca
- Units: Command of Women's Auxiliary Service; Directorate of Navy
- Commands: Women's Naval Auxiliary Service; Superintendent
- Conflicts: World War II

LCDR Ewa Zofia Miszewska (née Runge; 1917–1972) was an officer in the Polish Navy during World War II. She organized and commanded the Women's Naval Auxiliary Service (WNAS).

Ewa Miszewska became superintendent of WNAS after its separation in 1943 from Women's Auxiliary Service. She was trained at British officers course in Mill Hill and at Royal Naval College, Greenwich. After the end of the war she was promoted to junior inspector (Lieutenant Commander) and discharged in 1946, when all Polish Armed Forces in the West with women's auxiliary services within the Polish Resettlement Corps were disbanded. She emigrated to Argentina and lived in Mendoza, where she was known as Capitana Polaca.
