= Rolf Hochhuth =

German author and playwright (1931–2020)

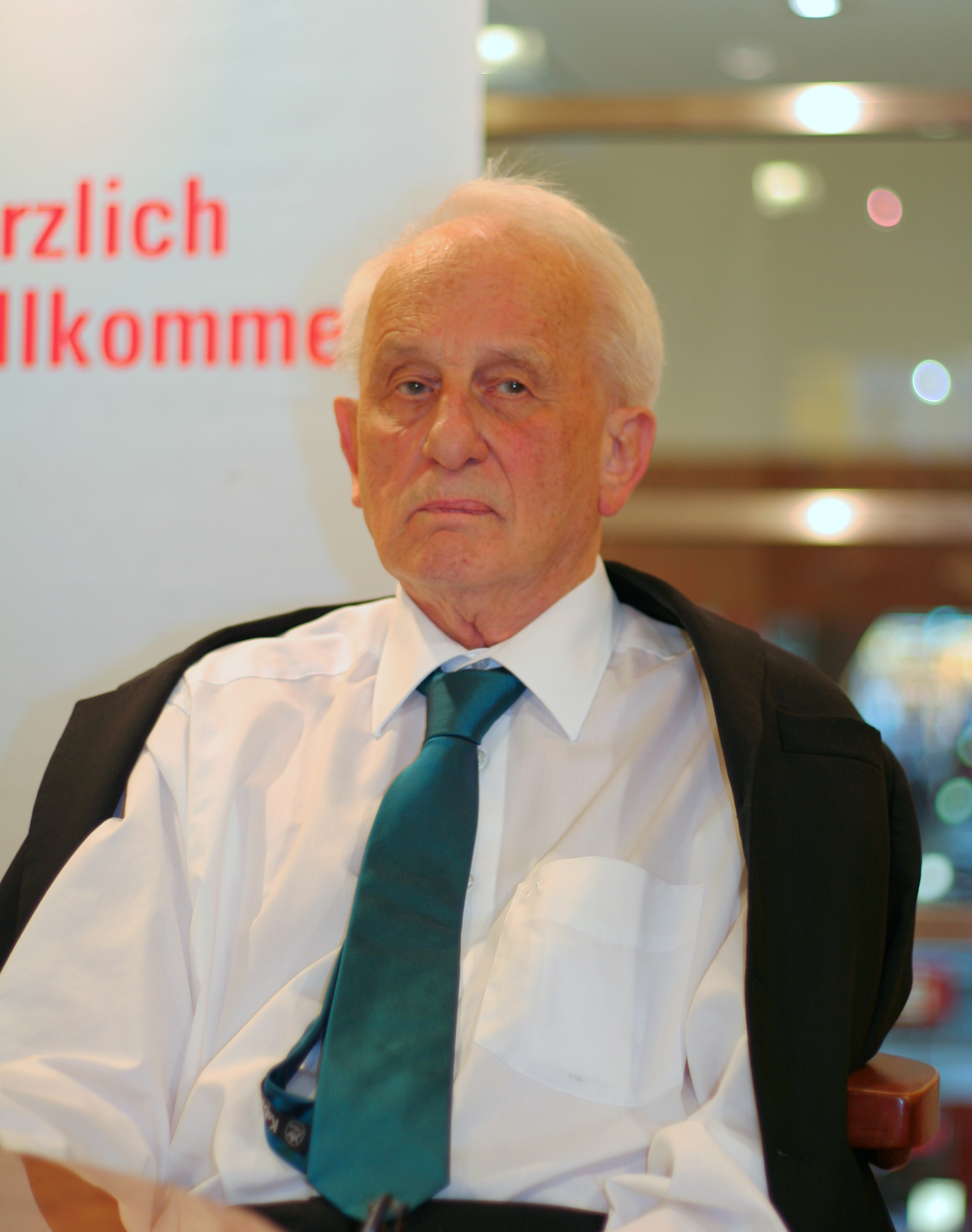
Rolf Hochhuth, 2009

Rolf Hochhuth (German: [ʁɔlf ˈhoːxˌhuːt]; 1 April 1931 – 13 May 2020) was a German author and playwright, best known for his 1963 drama The Deputy, which insinuates Pope Pius XII's indifference to Hitler's extermination of the Jews, and he remained a controversial figure both for his plays and other public comments and for his 2005 defense of British Holocaust denier David Irving.

== Life and career ==
=== Youth ===
Hochhuth was born in Eschwege, and was descended from a Protestant Hessian middle class family. His father was the owner of a shoe‐factory, which became bankrupt in the Depression. During World War II, he was a member of the Deutsches Jungvolk, a junior subdivision of the Hitler Youth; membership in the group had become legally compulsory in 1939. In 1948 he did an apprenticeship as a bookseller. Between 1950 and 1955 he worked in bookshops in Marburg, Kassel and Munich. At the same time he attended university lectures as a guest student and began with early attempts at writing fiction. Between 1955 and 1963 he was an editor at a major West-German publishing house.

=== The Deputy ===
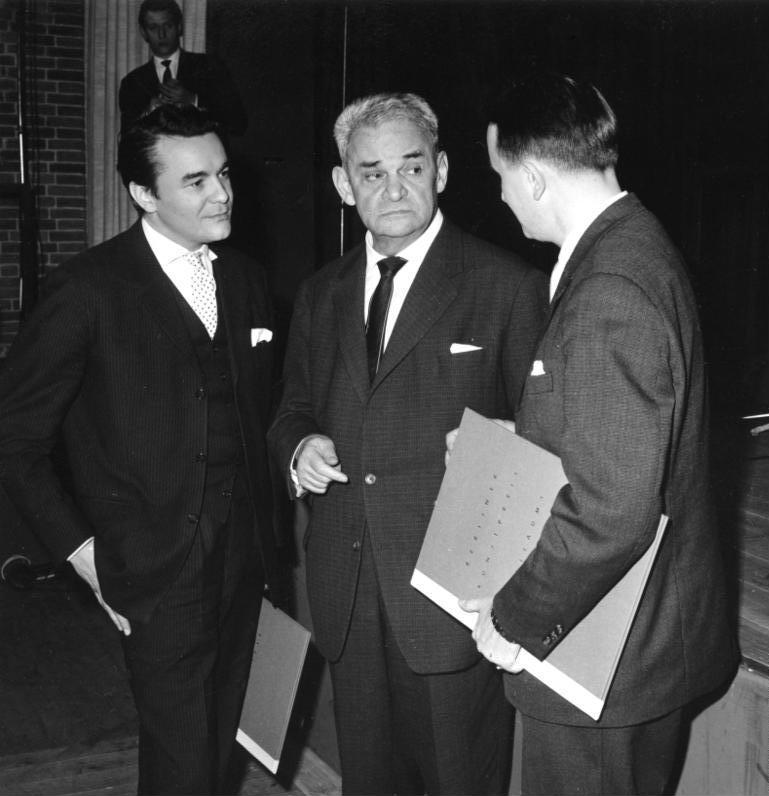
Rolf Hochhuth (right) at the awards ceremony of the Berliner Kunstpreis 1963 (from left to right: Klaus Kammer, Fritz Kortner, Rolf Hochhuth)

Hochhuth's drama, The Deputy (1963), was originally entitled Der Stellvertreter. Ein christliches Trauerspiel (The Deputy, a Christian Tragedy, translated by Richard and Clara Winston, 1964), the play caused a great deal of controversy because of its criticism of Pope Pius XII's role in World War II. The play was subsequently published in the UK in Robert David MacDonald's translation as The Representative (1965).

Its publisher Ed Keating and journalist Warren Hinckle, who themselves considered it "dramaturgically flawed," organized a committee to defend the play as a matter of free speech. In 2007, Ion Mihai Pacepa, a former Romanian spymaster, alleged that the play was part of a KGB campaign to discredit Pius XII. A leading German newspaper opined "that Hochhuth did not require any KGB assistance for his one-sided presentation of history."

The unedited version of the play would have run some eight or nine hours. As a result, each production adapted the text in its own way. No audience saw it in its original form. It includes the true story of Kurt Gerstein. Gerstein, a devout Protestant and later a member of the SS, wrote an eyewitness report about the gas chambers and, after the war, died as a POW.

The play was first performed in Berlin on 20 February 1963 under the direction of Erwin Piscator. It received its first English production in London by the Royal Shakespeare Company at the Aldwych Theatre in 1963 in a translation by Robert David MacDonald. It was directed by Clifford Williams with Alan Webb or Eric Porter as Pius XII, Alec McCowen as Father Fontana and Ian Richardson. In the United Kingdom it has since been revived at the Citizens Theatre, Glasgow, in 1986, and at the Finborough Theatre, London, in 2006.

An abridged version opened on Broadway on 26 February 1964 at the Brooks Atkinson Theatre, with Emlyn Williams as Pius XII and Jeremy Brett as Father Fontana. The play ran for 316 performances.

The Deputy was made into a film Amen by Costa Gavras in 2002, which focused more on the story of Kurt Gerstein.

=== Soldiers and Sikorski crash conspiracy theories ===
Hochhuth's next play, Soldiers: An Obituary for Geneva (1967), claimed that Winston Churchill was responsible for the death of Polish statesman Władysław Sikorski in the 1943 Gibraltar B-24 crash, contradicting the official version of events as an accident; the play implied that Sikorski had been murdered on Churchill's orders. Unbeknownst to Hochhuth, the pilot of the B-24, Eduard Prchal, was still alive and won a libel case against Hochhuth that seriously affected the London theater which staged the play.

That aspect of the play has overshadowed Hochhuth's conceit that the play would contribute to a debate on the ethics of the area bombardment of German cities by the Royal Air Force (RAF) during World War II, with particular reference to Operation Gomorrah, the Anglo-American air raid on Hamburg in 1943, and culminating in a fictional debate between Winston Churchill and the pacifist George Bell. The play partially drew on the work of English author David Irving, later known as a Holocaust denier. Irving and Hochhuth remained long-standing friends.

Controversy arose in Britain in 1967 when the intended premiere of the play at the National Theatre Company was cancelled due to an intervention from the theatre's board, despite the support for the play by literary manager Kenneth Tynan and Laurence Olivier, under pressure from Joan Plowright, his wife. At the time of the controversy, Irving was the only figure who gave his "unequivocal" support for Hochhuth's allegations towards Churchill; others consulted by Tynan considered it highly improbable. The play was produced shortly afterwards in the West End with John Colicos in the cast. The English translation was again by Robert David MacDonald. In the UK, the play was seen on tour in the early 1990s and was revived most recently at the Finborough Theatre, London, in 2004.

=== Sommer 14 - A Dance of Death ===
Sommer 14 - A Dance of Death had its UK premiere (and world premiere in English) in August 2014 at the Finborough Theatre in London. It was directed by Christopher Loscher and Mike Lees (who also designed) for Cerberus Theatre in a translation and adaptation by Mhairi Grealis.

=== A Love in Germany and the Filbinger Affaire ===
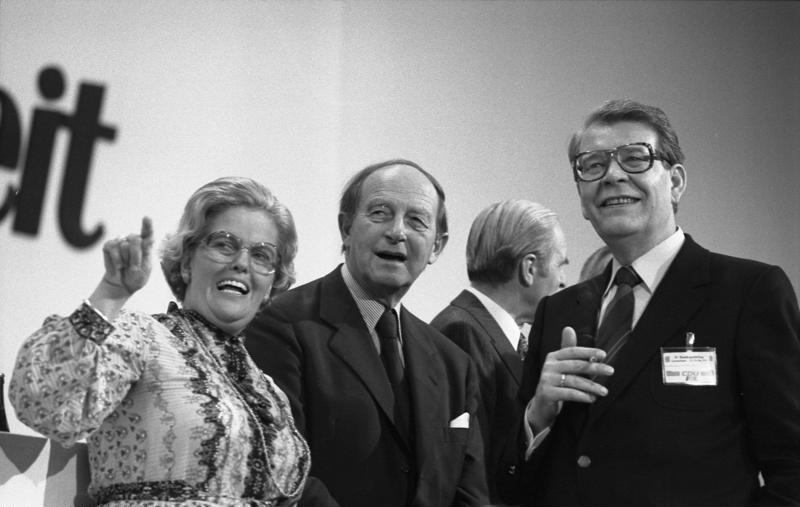
Hans Filbinger (centre) had to resign in 1978 as Minister-President of Baden-Württemberg after it became public via Hochhuth's novel A Love in Germany that he was responsible for death sentences as a Navy judge at the end of World War II

In 1978, his novel A Love in Germany about an affair between a Polish POW and a German woman in World War II stirred up a debate about the past of Hans Filbinger, Minister-President of Baden-Württemberg, who had been a Navy lawyer and judge at the end of World War II. The affair culminated in Filbinger's resignation.

For A Love in Germany, Hochhuth was awarded the Geschwister-Scholl-Preis in 1980. In 1983 Andrzej Wajda, who would later win an Honorary Oscar for Lifetime Achievement, made the story into the film Eine Liebe in Deutschland.

=== Alan Turing ===
His 1987 drama Alan Turing featured one of the fathers of modern computer science, who had made significant contributions to breaking German ciphers during World War II. The play also covered Turing's homosexuality, discovery of which resulted in his loss of career, court-ordered chemical castration, depression, and suicide.

=== McKinsey controversy ===
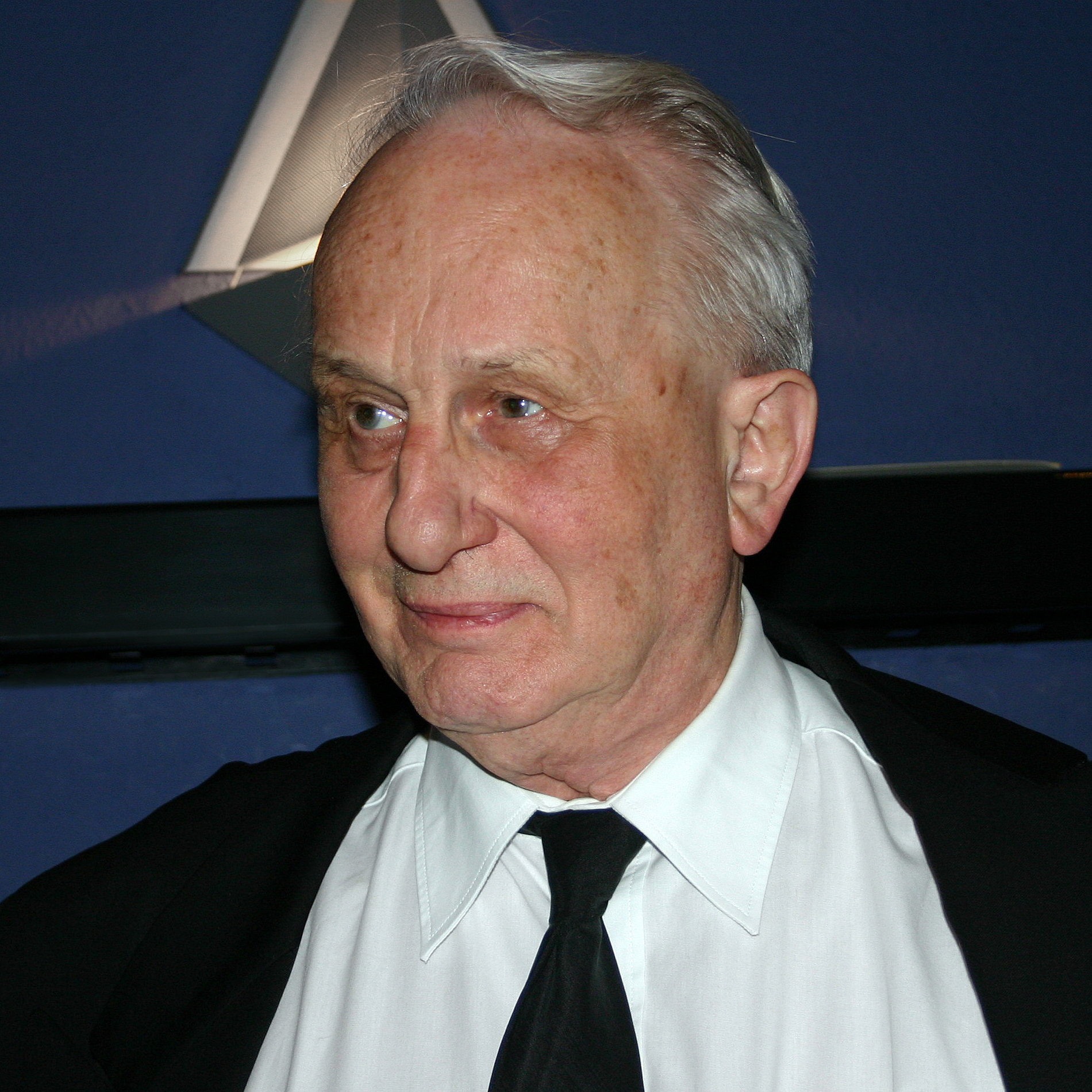
Rolf Hochhuth after a reading of his book McKinsey is Coming in Duisburg, 2005.

In 2004, he again caused controversy with the play McKinsey is Coming, which raises the questions of unemployment, social justice and the "right to work". A passage in which he put the chairman of the Deutsche Bank in one line with leading businessmen who had been murdered by left-wing terrorists and also with Gessler, the villainous bailiff killed by William Tell, was widely seen as advocating, or at least excusing, violence against leading economic figures. Hochhuth vigorously denied this.

=== Anti-Semitism allegations ===
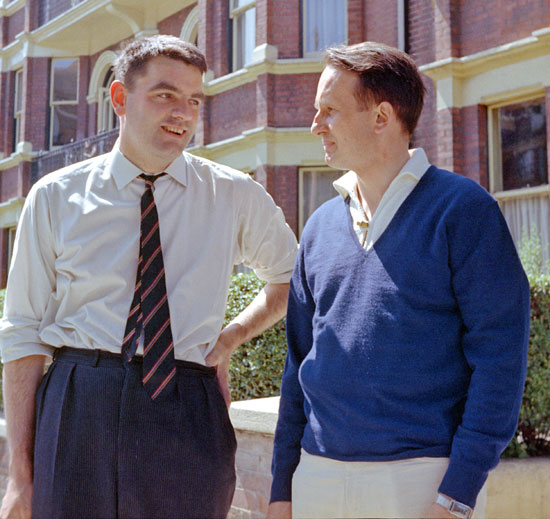
Rolf Hochhuth with British Holocaust denier David Irving in 1966.

In March 2005, Hochhuth became embroiled in controversy when, during an interview with the German weekly Junge Freiheit, he defended Holocaust denier David Irving, describing him as a "pioneer of modern history who has written magnificent books" and an "historian to equal someone like Joachim Fest". When asked about Irving's statement that "more women died on the back seat of Edward Kennedy's car at Chappaquiddick than ever died in a gas chamber in Auschwitz", Hochhuth dismissed it as provocative black humour.

Paul Spiegel, President of the Central Council of Jews in Germany, argued that with these statements Hochhuth himself was denying the Holocaust. After weeks of uproar, Hochhuth issued an apology.

=== Casual allegations ===
On opening of the archives of the Stasi, the East German Security Service, a report emerged according to which Hochhuth had casually made the allegation that Timothy Garton Ash, at that time working on a history dissertation in East Berlin, was a "British spy". The book by Garton Ash about how he himself had been surveilled details how such allegations in other cases had major consequences for the involved individuals.

== Works ==
Plays

- The Deputy, a Christian Tragedy (1962)
- Soldiers: An Obituary for Geneva (1967)
- Guerrillas (1970)
- The Midwife (1972)
- Death of a Hunter (1977)
- Ärztinnen (1979)
- The Survivor (1981)
- Alan Turing (1987)
- Wessis in Weimar (1993)
- McKinsey is Coming (2004)
- Heil Hitler! (2007)
- Sommer 14 (2014?)

Novels

- A Love in Germany (1978)

Hochhuth also collaborated with scripts for cinema and television:

- Berliner Antigone (1968)
- Élo Antigoné (1968)
- Ärztinnen (1984)
- Effis Nacht (1998)
- A Love in Germany (1983)

== Bibliography ==
- Emanuela Barasch-Rubinstein: The Devil, the Saints, and the Church: Reading Hochhuth's The Deputy. New York: P. Lang, 2004.
- Eric Bentley, editor: The Storm Over The Deputy: Essays and Articles about Hochhuth's Explosive Drama. New York: Grove Press, 1964.
- Christopher Bigsby: Remembering and Imagining the Holocaust: The Chain of Memory. Cambridge: Cambridge University Press, 2006. Chapter 3.
- Lucinda Jane Rennison: Rolf Hochhuth's Interpretation of History, and its Effect on the Content, Form and Reception of his Dramatic Work. Durham: University of Durham, 1991.
- Kathleen Tynan: The File on 'Soldiers': Historical Notes on Rolf Hochhuth's Play. London: Battley Bros., [1968].
- Margaret E. Ward: Rolf Hochhuth. Boston: Twayne Publishers, 1977.
