= Zofia Leśniowska =

Polish army lieutenant

Zofia Anna Leśniowska
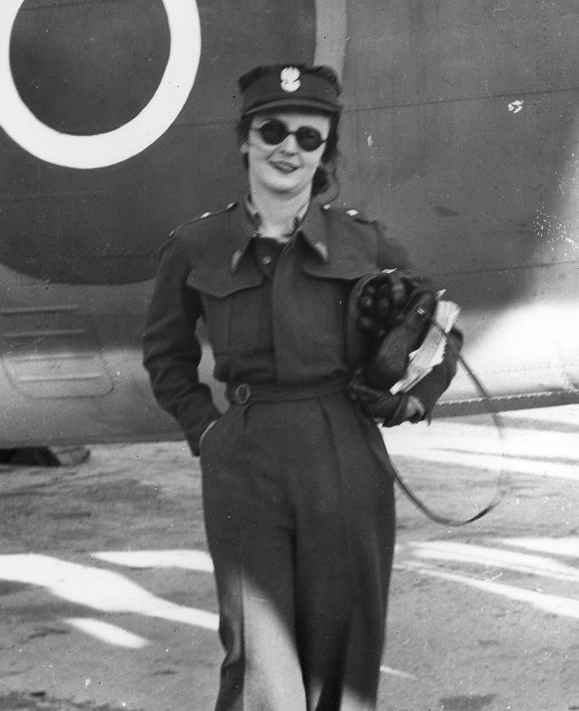
- Leśniowska in 1942
- Born: Zofia Wanda Sikorska; 2 March 1912; Lemberg, Austria-Hungary
- Died: 4 July 1943 (aged 31); Gibraltar
- Relatives: Władysław Sikorski (father); Helena Zubczewska (mother); Stanisław Leśniowski (husband)
- Military career
- Allegiance: Poland
- Branch: Polish Land Forces; Women's Auxiliary Service
- Service years: 1939 - 1943
- Rank: First lieutenant (porucznik)
- Commands: Women's Auxiliary Service Superintendent
- Battles and wars: Invasion of Poland; World War II
- Awards: Honorable Polish Red Cross' Order

Zofia Wanda Leśniowska (née Sikorska; 2 March 1912 – 4 July 1943) was the daughter of Lieutenant-General Władysław Sikorski. She was a first lieutenant (porucznik) in the Polish Armed Forces. She died together with her father in the controversial 1943 Gibraltar B-24 crash.

== Biography ==
Zofia Leśniowska, born on 2 March 1912, was the daughter of Lt. Gen. Władysław Sikorski and Helena Zubczewska, whom Sikorski married in 1909. On 30 September 1936 she married engineer Lt. Stanisław Leśniowski (1904 - 11 December 1987). She was active in the Polish Red Cross, and known for her passion for horse riding.

After World War II broke out, on 7 September 1939 Lt. Gen. Sikorski ordered her to organize a resistance movement. Her apartment on Górczewski's Street in Warsaw was used for a conspiracy movement. In January 1940 she was called as an emissary to France, and travelled as an underground courier, smuggling various documents. She was her father's personal secretary, coder, interpreter and advisor. She was decorated with the order of the Polish Red Cross; this was her only war time distinction. From 16 November 1942 to 18 February 1943 in London she was a superintendent of the Women's Auxiliary Service. She was killed, together with her father and nine others, when their plane crashed into the sea 16 seconds after takeoff from Gibraltar Airport at 23:07 on 4 July 1943. Her body was never found.

== Death and remembrance ==
The deaths of General Sikorski and Zofia remain something of a mystery. Her presence alongside the General in those tragic days is associated with controversy and misunderstandings. It has been speculated that instead of dying in the crash, she was abducted and imprisoned in the Soviet camps near Moscow, and later in the interior of the country where she was allegedly seen by Polish officers, including special agent Tadeusz Kobyliński. Such speculations, however, remain in the realm of conspiracy theories, and as noted by Roman Wapiński in the Polish Biographical Dictionary, it is presumed Zofia died alongside her father in what was just an accident.
