= Eduard Prchal =

Czech pilot (1911–1984)

Eduard Maximilian Prchal
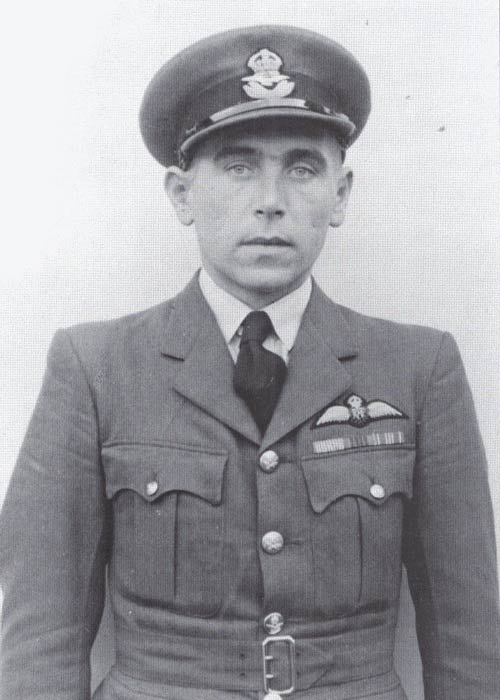
- Born: 1 January 1911; Dolní Břežany, Bohemia, Austria-Hungary
- Died: 4 December 1984 (aged 73) St. Helena, California, U.S.
- Allegiance: Czechoslovakia
- Service years: 1930–1946

Eduard Maximilian Prchal (1 January 1911 – 4 December 1984 (Note: Some sources claim date of death as 12 December 1984.)) was a Czech pilot and sole survivor of a 1943 plane crash that killed the Polish Prime Minister Władysław Sikorski.

== Biography ==
Eduard Prchal was born in Dolní Břežany, Bohemia, Austria-Hungary (now the Czech Republic) on 1 January 1911. He was born into a family of cabinet makers. After completing his secondary education he worked for a brief period as a car sales representative. In October 1930, he was required to do military service; with help of his uncle, a colonel, he applied successfully to the Czechoslovak Air Force. His basic flying training ended in October 1931, and he was posted to an observation squadron based at Hradec Králové. Prchal was soon recognised as being a skilled pilot. In 1932 he graduated from flying training as an operational military pilot, and in 1934 he completed night flying training. Prchal served in the army until May 1937, then joined the Bata shoe company as a commercial pilot.

On 22 June 1939, soon after the German occupation of Czech lands, Prchal illegally crossed the border into Poland and a week later arrived in France. There he joined the French Foreign Legion as the alternative to deportation. At the outset of World War II, Prchal joined the French Armee de l'Air and made three "kills" during the Battle of France. Two days after the French capitulation, he flew from Bordeaux to Bayonne and boarded a ship to England, where he joined the Royal Air Force Volunteer Reserve and later was posted to the 310th Czechoslovak Squadron. He destroyed three enemy aircraft by himself and shared in the destruction of three more. In March 1941, Prchal was posted as an instructor to train fighter pilots. At this time, he volunteered for training to become a night fighter pilot. Eventually he was transferred to Transport Command and repeatedly flew to Gibraltar and Malta. His role was also to fly VIP passengers to the Middle and Far East.

Eduard Prchal is now remembered chiefly as the pilot in the crash of the B-24 at Gibraltar in July 1943 which killed the commander-in-chief of the Polish Army and Prime Minister of the Polish Government in Exile Władysław Sikorski, and 15 others. The seriously injured Prchal was the only survivor. He resumed piloting VIPs in September 1943, making long-haul flights until the end of World War II.

In September 1943, Prchal was married to Dolores Šperková (1915–1990).

In August 1945, Prchal returned to Czechoslovakia and rejoined its Air Force until demobilization in early 1946. He then worked as the chief pilot of the Czechoslovak National Airline (ČSA), but he distrusted the new rulers of his homeland after the Communist Party seized power in 1948, and he feared arrest. On 30 September 1950, (Note: Some sources claim Prchal fled on 30 September 1949. Other dates can be also found.) Prchal, his wife, their daughter, and six others flew from Prague to RAF Manston in England in a stolen Douglas DC-3 plane.

Unable to find work as a pilot in England, Prchal moved with his family to the United States in 1952. Here, too, he failed to secure a position in either the air force or in the aeronautical industry. Instead, he worked in education in California until he retired in 1978.

== Sikorski crash theories ==
In 1967, Rolf Hochhuth, a German playwright, included one theory of the 1943 crash in his play Soldiers: An Obituary for Geneva. Here it was an ‘accident’ initiated by Winston Churchill who had instructed the British Secret Service to make the necessary arrangements. Unaware that Prchal was still alive, Hochhuth accused the pilot of participating in this plot. A libel case resulted and a court in London found in favour of Prchal and awarded him substantial damages and costs of £50,000. Hochhuth moved to Switzerland and avoided the payments. The London theatre staging the play agreed to out-of-court compensation.

Prchal was later interviewed several times about the crash.
