= Marcin Bosak =

Polish actor

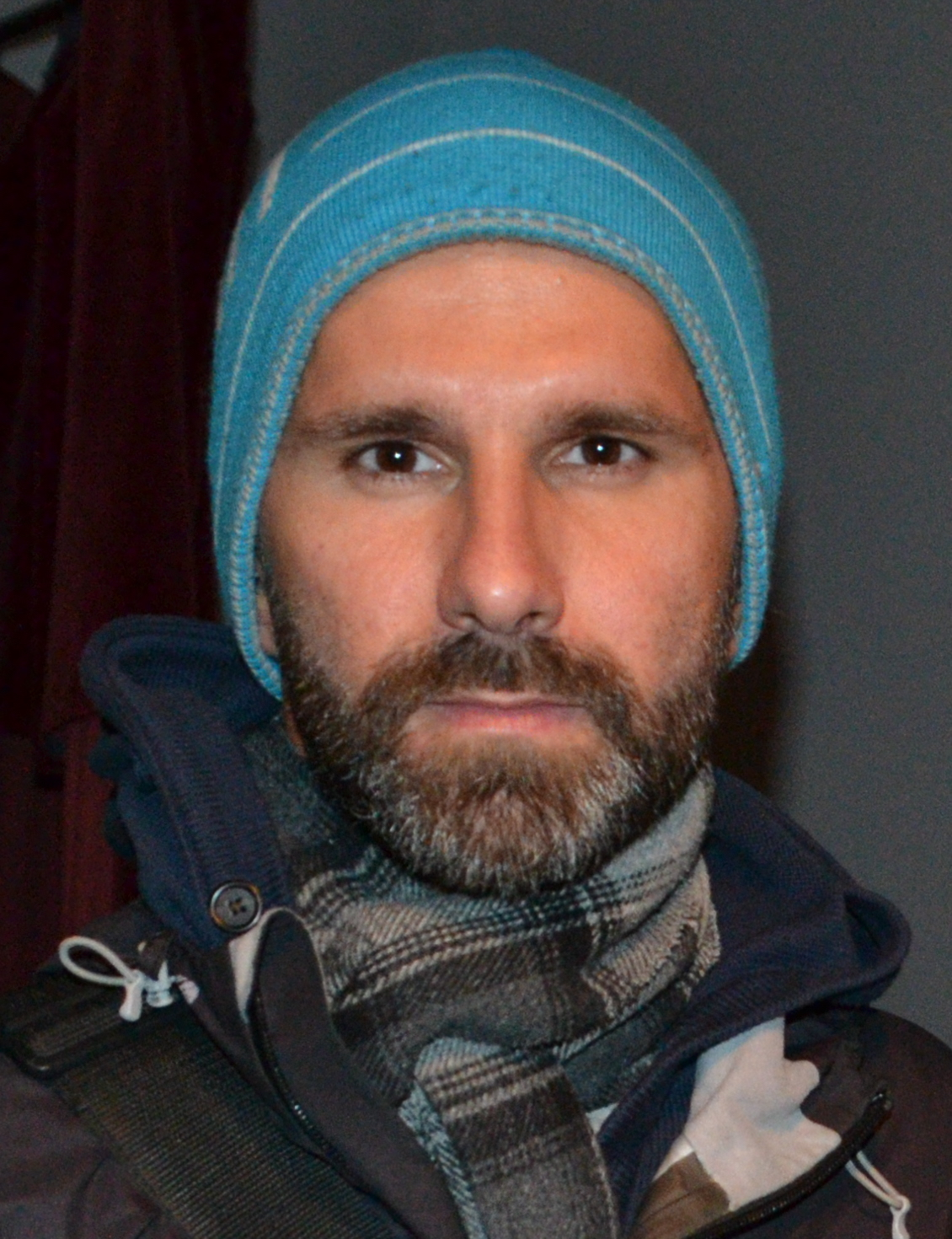
- Born: 9 September 1979 (age 46); Łódź, Poland
- Occupation: Actor
- Years active: 1995-present
- Spouse: Maria Debska (2020-2022)

Marcin Bosak (born 9 September 1979 in Łódź) is a Polish actor. He appeared in more than twenty-five films since 1995.

== Biography ==
He was born and raised in Łódź. He has a younger sister, Anna, finalist of the You Can Dance: Po prostu tańcz!. He attended the Tadeusz Kościuszko Secondary School No. 3 in Łódź. In 2003, he graduated from Aleksander Zelwerowicz National Academy of Dramatic Art in Warsaw. He was the Polish junior karate champion several times.

He became recognizable as Kamil Gryc, the roommate of Kingi (Katarzyna Cichopek) and Piotr (Marcin Mroczek) Zduński and Magda (Anna Mucha) in the TVP2 M jak miłość series (2003–2006 and again from 2019). He appeared in the music video for the song by Maciej Maleńczuk "Last nocka" (2011) and in the video clip for the Czerwone Świnie band "Parafiańszczyzna" (2019). In 2012, he joined the Studio Theater in Warsaw.

In 2020, he was a participant in the eleventh edition of Polsat entertainment program Dancing with the Stars: Taniec z gwiazdami. In July, he withdrew from further participation in the competition, thus taking the 11th place.

In the years 2002–2018 he was associated with actress Monika Pikuła, with whom he has two sons: Władysław (born 2008) and Jan (born 2012).

== Filmography ==
- 1995: Z piosenką przez Belweder
- 1999: Czy można się przysiąść
- 2003-2006: M jak miłość
- 2004: The Welts
- 2006: Just Love Me
- 2008: Mała wielka miłość
- 2009: Generał. Zamach na Gibraltarze
- 2009: Janosik. Prawdziwa historia
- 2011: In Darkness
- 2011: 80 Million
- 2013: Czas honoru
- 2017: Spoor
- 2018: Raven
- 2019–22: The Defence
