= Tadeusz Klimecki =

Polish Army general

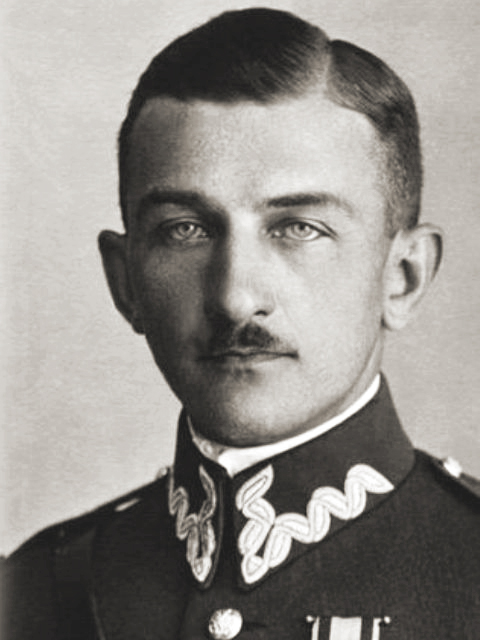
- Born: 23 November 1895; Tarnów, Austro Hungary
- Died: 4 July 1943 (aged 47); Gibraltar
- Burial place: Powązki Military Cemetery
- Alma mater: Higher War School
- Military career
- Allegiance: Second Polish Republic
- Branch: Polish Army
- Rank: Brigadier general
- Unit: 5th Podhale Rifles Infantry Regiment
- Conflicts: World War II

Tadeusz Klimecki (November 23, 1895 – July 4, 1943) was a Brigadier General of the Polish Army who served as Chief of the Polish General Staff during World War II, from 1940 to 1943.

== Early life and service in the Imperial and Royal Army ==
Tadeusz Klimecki was born in Tarnów, Galicia, Austro-Hungarian Empire. His father was a local lawyer, Joseph Klimecki, and his mother was Ludwika Regiec.

In 1913 he graduated from the gymnasium in Jasło and enrolled at the Faculty of Law of the Jagiellonian University.

In 1914 he joined the Eastern Legion, and at its dissolution he was drafted into the Austrian army. After graduating from the school of infantry officers he was sent to the Italian front as a platoon leader. In 1915 he was appointed a standard-bearer, in 1916 – a second lieutenant. By the end of World War I he had been wounded three times and served as a company commander.

== Service in the Polish Army ==
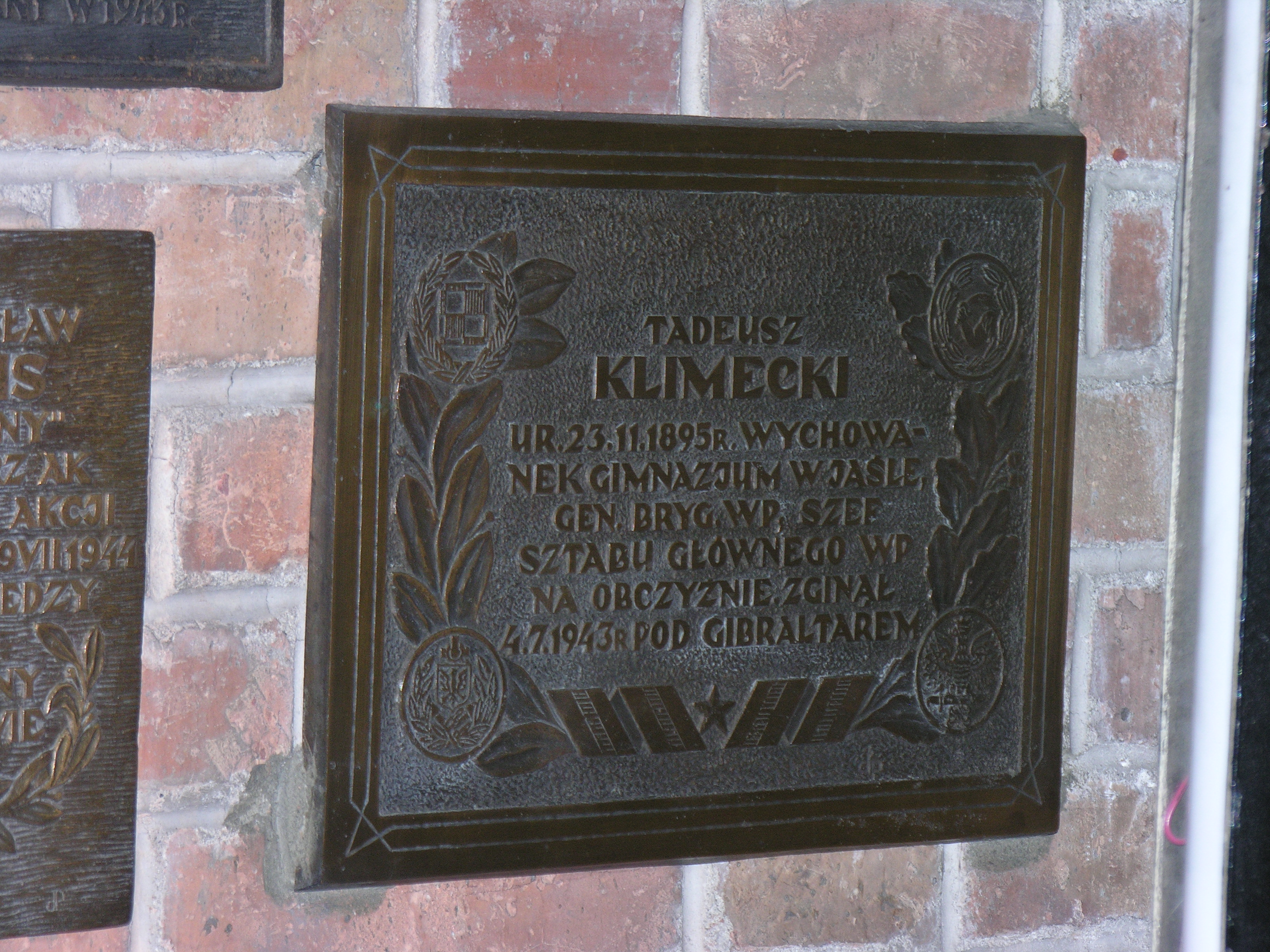
The memorial Plate in Jaślo

From November 1918 he served in the Polish Army. Between November 1918 and October 1925 he was a company and battalion commander in the 16th Infantry Regiment, Tarnów and during the war with the Bolsheviks, he commanded the regiment (31.VII-4.VIII.1920). From October 1925 to October 1927 he was a student of the Highest Military School in Warsaw, after which he was Chief of Staff of the 12th Infantry Division in Tarnopol until 1930. During the years 1930–1934, he was a professor of tactics at the Higher Military School in Warsaw.

Between January 1934 and 1936, he served as Deputy Commander of the 18th Infantry Regiment in Skierniewice.

From 1936 to 1938, he was Commander of the 5th Podhale Rifles Regiment in Przemyśl.

From 1938 to September 1939 he was Head of the course at the Higher Military School in Warsaw, after which he was appointed to the Division III of the General Staff as a Chief of the Department of Operations. After the September campaign he moved to France.

From December 1939 to June 1940, he was Head of Division III of the Polish General Staff in France.

From July 1940 to July 1943, he served as Chief of the General Staff of the Supreme Commander in London.

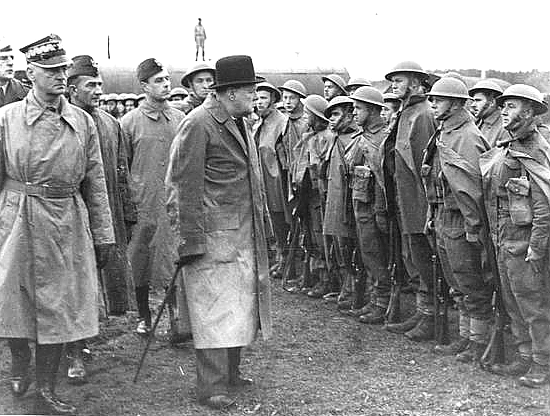
Gen.Sikorski, Gen.Klimecki and Winston Churchill, reviewing Polish troops in England.

He died in the plane crash on July 4, 1943, in Gibraltar, together with the Polish Prime Minister and Commander-in-Chief General Władysław Sikorski and his staff. Tadeusz Klimecki was buried in the cemetery of Polish airmen in Newark-on-Trent, England.

On December 3, 2010, the bodies of Tadeusz Klimecki, Andrzej Marecki and Józef Ponikiewski were exhumed, flown to Warsaw and then taken to the Department of Forensic Medicine in Cracow for examination. On December 9, 2010, Tadeusz Klimecki and Andrzej Marecki were buried in the Powązki Military Cemetery in Warsaw.

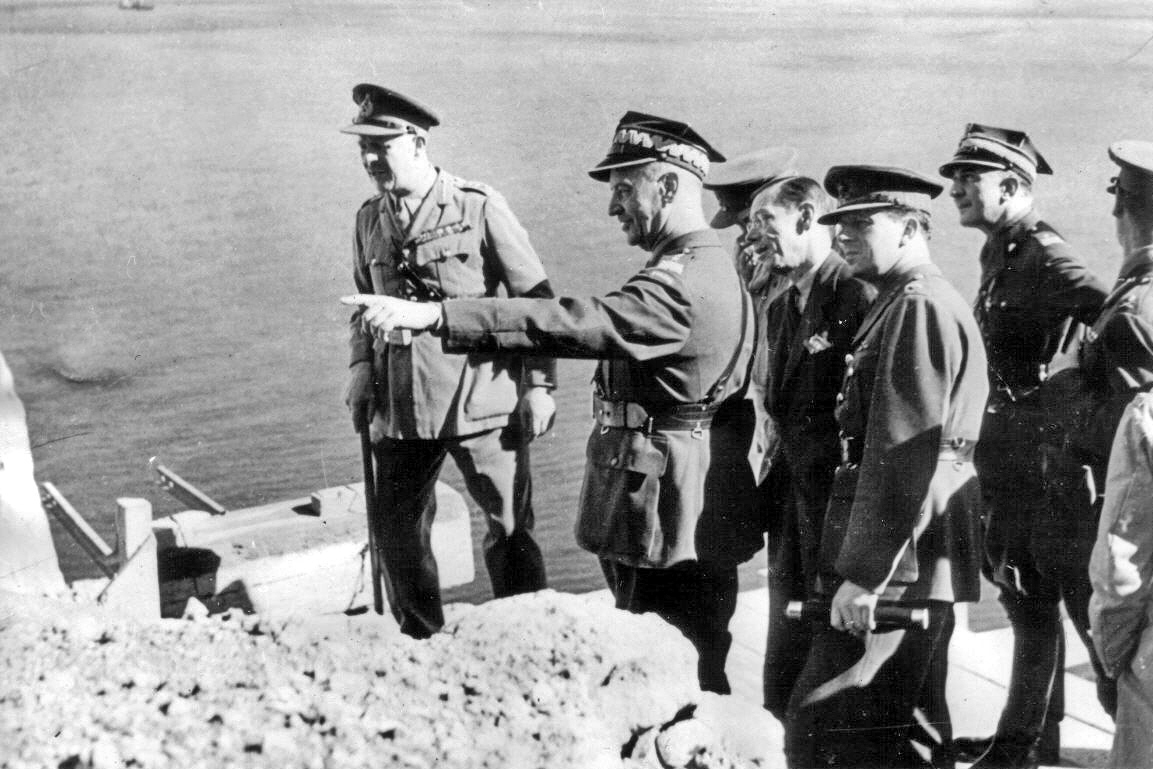
Gen. Sikorski and Gen. Klimecki, July 4, 1943, Gibraltar.

== Promotions ==
- Captain – since June 1, 1919
- Major – since July 1, 1925
- Lieutenant Colonel – since January 1, 1931
- Colonel – since March 19, 1938
- Brigadier – since February 6, 1941

== Orders and decorations ==
- Silver Cross of the Order of Virtuti Militari
- Commander's Cross with Star of the Order of Polonia Restituta
- Cross of Valour
- Grand Officer of the Order of the White Lion, 1941
