= Women's Auxiliary Service (Poland) =

The Women's Auxiliary Service
- Active: 1941–1946
- Disbanded: March 1946
- Country: Poland
- Branch: Army Navy Air Force
- Size: ca. 4,000 volunteers
- Part of: II Corps
- Nickname: Pestki
- Decorations: Cross of Valor (9), Golden Cross of Merit (2), Silver Cross of Merit (74), Bronze Cross of Merit (154), Monte Cassino Commemorative Cross (950)

Commanders
- Notable commanders: Władysława Piechowska; Bolesława Wysłouch; Zofia Leśniowska

The Women's Auxiliary Service (WAS) (Polish: Pomocnicza Służba Kobiet (PSK), Pestki) was a unit of Polish Armed Forces during World War II established in 1941 by initiative of Lt. Gen. Władysław Anders, while creating Polish Armed Forces in the East.

Pestki worked as nurses, cooks, teachers in schools for war orphans, secretaries in staffs, pilots, drivers, etc. In active service there were around 4,000 volunteers in any time of World War II, but 1 July 1945, in time of highest abundance, there were 7,000 women in WAS.

In 1944 WAS was transferred to II Corps in Italy. In July 1944 Minister of National Defence reorganized WAS separating three new units:

- Women's Army Auxiliary Service (WAAS) (Pomocnicza Wojskowa Służba Kobiet, PWSK)
- Women's Air Force Auxiliary Service (WAFAS) (Pomocnicza Lotnicza Służba Kobiet, PLSK)
- Women's Naval Auxiliary Service (WNAS) (Pomocnicza Morska Służba Kobiet, PMSK)

The same bylaw established Headquarters of WAAS, Commandants of WAAS, WAFAS, WNAS and Superintendents to corps and armies' commands. Commissioned officers were appointed by the President of the Republic of Poland. Military ranks were also harmonized with ranks of Polish Armed Forces in the West.

First Superintendent of WAS was Władysława Piechowska, another was Zofia Leśniowska.

The WAS was disbanded in March 1946.

== See also ==
Ewa Miszewska

== Bibliography ==
- Biegański Witold, Polskie Siły Zbrojne na Zachodzie 1939-1945, Krajowa Agencja Wydawnicza, 1990
- Biegański Witold, Walki formacji polskich na Zachodzie, 1939-1945, Wydawnictwo Ministerstwa Obrony Narodowej, 1981, ISBN 83-11-06577-2
- Biegański Witold, Brodala Jan, Regularne jednostki wojska polskiego na Zachodzie, Wydawnictwo Ministerstwa Obrony Narodowej, 1973
- Bobińska Anna, Pomocnicza Wojskowa Służba Kobiet 2 Korpusu 1941-1945, Krupski i S-ka, London, 1999, ISBN 83-86117-14-1
- Cook Bernard A., Women and war: a historical encyclopedia from antiquity to the present, ABC-CLIO, 2006, ISBN 1-85109-770-8
- Car Edward M., Kobiety w szeregach Polskich Sił Zbrojnych na Zachodzie, 1940-1948, Oficyna Wydawnicza Adiutor, 1995, ISBN 83-86100-04-4
- Dzierżek Anna, Galczewska Zofia, Horbaczewska Irena, Poliszewska Halina, Kaczorowski Ryszard, Pomocnicza Służba Kobiet w Polskich Siłach Zbrojnych na Zachodzie 1939-1945, Koło Kobiet Żołnierzy PSZ w Wielkiej Brytanii, London 1995, ISBN 1-872286-23-2
- Iwanowski Wincenty, Z dziejów formacji polskich na Zachodzie, 1939-1945, Wydawnictwo Ministerstwa Obrony Narodowej, 1976
- Jaroszynśka-Kirchmann Anna D., The exile mission: the Polish political diaspora and Polish Americans, 1939-1956, Ohio University Press, 2004, ISBN 0-8214-1526-3
- Maćkowska Maria, Pomocnicza Służba Kobiet w Polskich Siłach Zbrojnych, London, 1990
