= Dariusz Baliszewski =

Polish historian, journalist, and writer (1946–2020)

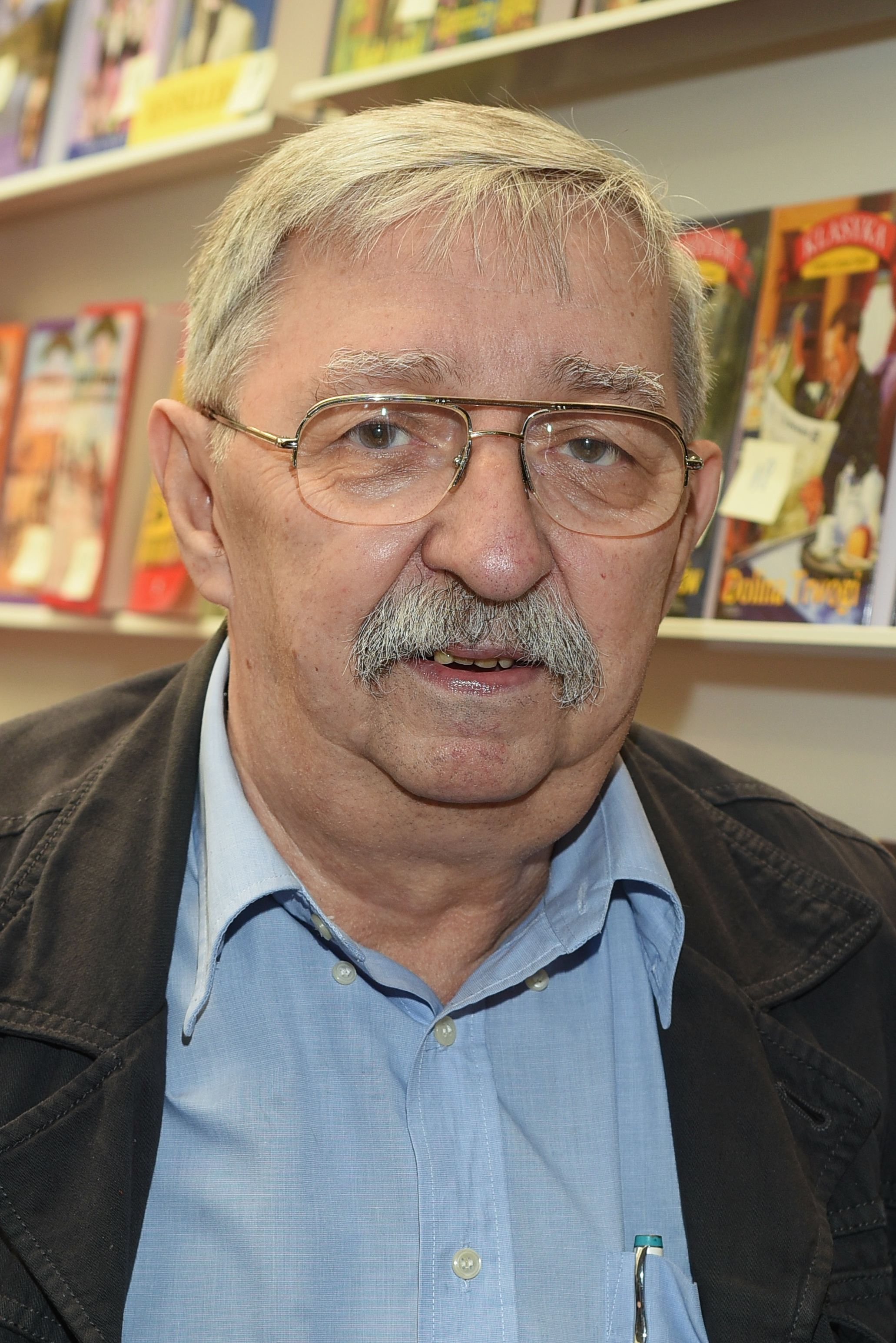
- Dariusz Baliszewski in 2018
- Born: 14 April 1946; Warsaw
- Died: 10 August 2020 (aged 74); Warsaw
- Occupation: Historian
- Known for: educational activity on television
- Awards: Cross of Merit

Dariusz Baliszewski (14 April 1946 – 10 August 2020) was a Polish historian, journalist and writer. Author of television show "Rewizja nadzwyczajna", he was a common author of historical articles to one of the biggest Polish magazines, Wprost. He specialized in Polish 20th century history, and is known for several controversial hypotheses, like those related to the death of general Władysław Sikorski.

In 1999, for his television creativity and professionalism in work, president Aleksander Kwaśniewski awarded him:
Silver Cross of Merit.

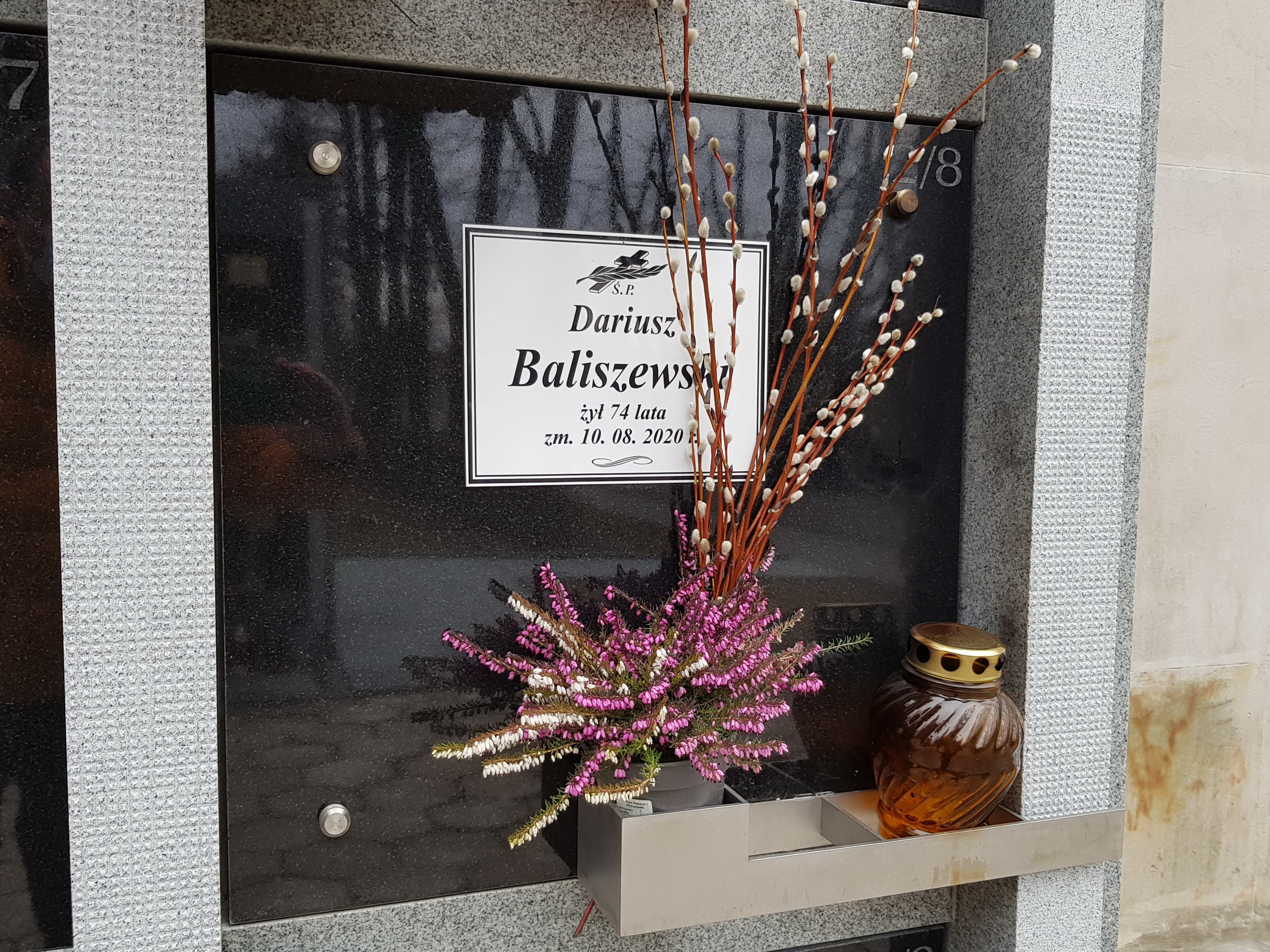
Baliszewski's grave
