= Roman Wapiński =

Polish historian

Roman Wapiński (8 March 1931 in Nowa Wieś – 14 May 2008 in Gdańsk) was a Polish historian, lecturer at the University of Gdańsk. He specialized in the history of the Second Polish Republic and right-wing National Democracy political camp, being the foremost historian of National Democracy. Wapiński was considered one of the foremost Polish historians.

Wapiński graduated in 1955 from the Department of History of the University of Warsaw. All his later life he was however related to the city of Gdańsk. Also thanks to his efforts, the University of Gdańsk was opened in 1970. Wapiński was an active member of the Polish United Workers' Party, which helped him to accomplish many of his organizational efforts. He gained a professor degree in 1971. He received Doctor honoris causa from the University of Wrocław on 28 February 2001. Wapiński was since 2003 a member of the Polish Academy of Sciences. In 1999-2002 he presided over its Committee of Historical Sciences.

He wrote about 400 scientific works and led about 270 graduation theses and 35 doctorates. He led graduation theses e.g. of Donald Tusk, Arkadiusz Rybicki or Wiesław Walendziak. Donald Tusk wrote his thesis about formation of the legend of Józef Piłsudski in the interwar press.

In his scientific works, Wapiński focused mostly on the Second Polish Republic and the right-wing National Democracy political camp. His book Narodowa Demokracja 1893-1939: Ze studiów nad dziejami myśli nacjonalistycznej (National Democracy 1893-1939: From the Study of the History of Nationalist Thought), published in 1980, was a groundbreaking work on the National Democracy. Historian Szymon Rudnicki pointed out that all contemporary works about National Democracy have their sources in Wapiński's book. The book is so far an ultimate work on the National Democratic ideology. In his later works, he focused on the political consciousness of Poles and their attitude towards the state. Wapiński also wrote several synthetic books about Polish political generations and the sociopolitical environment, in which they worked and shaped the Polish politics.

== Works ==
- Pierwsze lata władzy ludowej na Wybrzeżu Gdańskim (1970)
- Władysław Sikorski (1978, 1979, 1982)
- Narodowa Demokracja 1893-1939: Ze studiów nad dziejami myśli nacjonalistycznej (National Democracy 1893-1939: From the Study of the History of Nationalist Thought) (1980)
- Życie polityczne Pomorza w latach 1920-1939 (Political Life of Pomerania 1920-1939) (1983)
- Roman Dmowski (1988, 1989)
- Świadomość polityczna w Drugiej Rzeczypospolitej (Political Consciousness in the Second Republic) (1991)
- Pokolenia Drugiej Rzeczypospolitej (Generations of the Second Republic) (1991)
- Polska i małe ojczyzny Polaków (Poland and Small Motherlands of Poles) (1994)
- Historia polskiej myśli politycznej XIX i XX wieku (History of Polish Political Thought of the 19th and 20th Centuries) (1997)
- Ignacy Paderewski (1999)
- Polityka i politycy: O polskiej scenie politycznej XX wieku (Politics and Politicians: On Polish Political Scene of the 20th Century) (2006)
