= 1943 Gibraltar Liberator AL523 crash =

Crash that killed General Władysław Sikorski

1943 Gibraltar B-24 crash
- Sikorski's Liberator, lying on its back in the sea just off Gibraltar following the crash

Accident
- Date: 4 July 1943
- Summary: Crashed on take-off due to control jam
- Site: Gibraltar Airport; 36°09′09″N 05°19′48″W

Aircraft
- Aircraft type: Consolidated B-24 Liberator
- Operator: Royal Air Force 511 Squadron
- Registration: AL523
- Last stopover: Gibraltar
- Destination: London
- Occupants: 17
- Passengers: 11
- Crew: 6
- Fatalities: 16
- Injuries: 1
- Survivors: 1

On 4 July 1943, a Liberator II aircraft crashed off Gibraltar shortly after takeoff, killing all but one of the seventeen people on board. Among the victims were several senior Polish military leaders, including General Władysław Sikorski, the commander-in-chief of the Polish Army and prime minister of the Polish government-in-exile. The plane's pilot was the only survivor.

The crash was ruled to have been an accident, but the conclusion sparked controversy on Sikorski's death, with several alternative theories put forward. The crash marked a turning point for Polish influence on their Anglo-American allies in World War II.

== Background ==
The relationship between the Soviet Union and Poland was tenuous at best during World War II for a variety of reasons, and became more so, after the 1940 Katyn massacre of over 20,000 Polish servicemen by the Soviets came to light. However, pragmatic General Władysław Sikorski was still open to some form of normalisation of Polish-Soviet relations, while General Władysław Anders was vehemently opposed. To boost morale, Sikorski began a tour of inspection of the Polish forces stationed in the Middle East in May 1943, tending to political affairs where necessary.

== Accident ==
On 4 July 1943, while Sikorski was returning to London from an inspection of Polish forces deployed in the Middle East, his aircraft, a Royal Air Force (RAF) Consolidated Liberator, serial number AL523, crashed into the sea 16 seconds after taking off from Gibraltar Airport at 23:07 hours.

This Liberator C II was purchased and converted by the RAF for use as a transport and operated by No. 511 Squadron of RAF Transport Command on long-range flights between the UK and Gibraltar.

In 1972, the pilot, Flight Lieutenant Eduard Prchal, described the events: "I received the green light from the tower and we began our take-off run. I pulled the stick back and the aircraft started to climb. When I was at 150ft I pushed the controls of the aircraft forward to gain speed. Suddenly I discovered I was not able to pull the stick back. The steering mechanism was jammed or locked." The aircraft then lost height rapidly. Prchal closed the four throttles and warned the others through the intercom "Attention, crash". The aircraft crashed into the sea.

Sixteen people were killed: all eleven passengers and five of the six crew members. Only Prchal survived. The passengers included:

- General Władysław Sikorski
- Colonel Victor Cazalet MC – Conservative Party Member of Parliament for Chippenham, British liaison officer to the Polish forces
- Jan Gralewski – an Armia Krajowa courier
- Major General Tadeusz Klimecki – Polish Army Chief of General Staff
- Zofia Leśniowska – Sikorski's daughter and secretary
- Colonel Andrzej Marecki – Polish Army Chief of Operations
- Brigadier John Percival Whiteley OBE – Conservative Party Member of Parliament for Buckingham

== Aftermath ==
Sikorski's body was collected by the Polish Navy destroyer ORP Orkan and transported to Britain. He was subsequently buried in a brick-lined grave at the Polish War Cemetery in Newark-on-Trent, England, on 16 July that year. Winston Churchill delivered a eulogy at his funeral. The bodies of Sikorski's daughter and four other passengers and crew were not found.

Sikorski's death marked a turning point for Polish influence amongst the Anglo-American allies. He had been the most prestigious leader of the Polish exiles and it was a severe setback for the Polish cause, for no Pole after him would have much sway with the Allied politicians.

== Incident investigation and controversy ==
=== British 1943 investigation ===
A British Court of Inquiry convened on 7 July 1943 to investigate the crash, following the order by Air Marshal Sir John Slessor of 5 July 1943. On 25 July 1943 the court concluded that the accident was caused by the "jamming of elevator controls" which led to the aircraft being uncontrollable after take-off. The report noted that "it has not been possible to determine how the jamming occurred" although it ruled out sabotage. Slessor was not satisfied with the report and on 28 July ordered the court to continue its investigation to find out whether the controls were indeed jammed or not, and if they were, then for what reason. Despite further investigation the court was unable to resolve Slessor's doubts. The Polish government refused to endorse this report because of the contradictions cited therein, and the lack of conclusive findings.

"Conclusions

a) Liberator AL 523, total all up weight 54,608 lbs, took off from Gibraltar at 23.07 hours on 4 July 1943 bound for UK. The weather was fine, wind light, no cloud, visibility 10 miles. The aircraft was airborne after a run of approximately 1100 yards, climbed to about 150 feet in a perfectly normal manner and then gradually lost height, striking the sea on an even keel approximately 1200 yards after leaving the ground. The evidence suggests that the pilot had throttled back a moment before impact and that his engines had been running normally up to that time. The pilot was recovered by the Station rescue dinghy within six minutes of the crash and was the sole survivor.

b) The cause of the accident was, in the opinion of the court, due to the aircraft becoming uncontrollable for reasons which cannot be established. The pilot, having eased the control column forward to build up speed after take-off, found that he was unable to move it back at all, the elevator controls being virtually jammed somewhere in the system. It is impossible, from the evidence available and examination of the wreckage, to offer any concrete reason as to why the elevator system should have become jammed."

"... The findings of the court and the observations of the officers whose duty it is to review and comment on those findings have been considered and it is apparent that the accident was due to the jamming of the elevator controls shortly after take-off with the result that the aircraft became uncontrollable.

After most careful examination of all the available evidence, including that of the pilot, it has not been possible to determine how the jamming occurred but it has been established that there was no sabotage.

It is also clear that the captain of the aircraft who is a pilot of great experience and exceptional ability was in no way to blame.

An officer of the Polish Air Force attended throughout the proceedings."

=== Conspiracy theories ===
The political context of the event, coupled with a variety of curious circumstances, immediately gave rise to speculation that Sikorski's death had not been an accident, and might have been the direct result of a Soviet, British, or even Polish conspiracy. Some modern sources still note that the accident was not fully explained; for example Jerzy Jan Lerski in his Historical Dictionary of Poland (1996), entry on the "Gibraltar, Catastrophe of", noted that "there are several theories explaining the event, but the mystery was never fully solved." However, as Roman Wapiński noted in his biographical entry on Sikorski in the Polish Biographical Dictionary in 1997, no conclusive evidence of any wrongdoing had been found, and Sikorski's official cause of death was listed as an accident.

=== Polish 2008 investigation ===
In 2008, there was investigation opened in Poland by Commission for the Prosecution of Crimes against the Polish Nation of the Institute of National Remembrance. Sikorski was exhumed and his remains were examined by Polish court experts, who concluded in 2009 that he died of multiple injuries consistent with an air crash, and possibly of drowning as an additional cause. The injuries occurred while Sikorski was alive. The possibility that Sikorski had been shot, strangled, or stabbed was dismissed. Tadeusz Klimecki, Andrzej Marecki and Józef Ponikiewski were exhumed as well, and their injuries were of similar nature. Thus, theories that Polish delegation was murdered before the incident were ruled out. However, they did not rule out the possibility of sabotage, which was still being investigated. On 30 December 2013 the Institute of National Remembrance closed the investigation on a basis, that the evidence is not enough to confirm, nor to exclude a sabotage.

=== Attempts of air crash explanations ===
In 2012, Jerzy Zięborak revisited the evidence gathered by the Court of Inquiry in 1943 as well as other material that has been made available to date. His conclusion was that the accident resulted from the combination of factors. Firstly, the aircraft was overloaded and its centre of gravity was displaced beyond the permissible limit. Secondly, the aircraft speed at take-off was too low due to the excessive weight. Finally, the autopilot was switched on just after the take-off – contrary to the flight manual – and that caused an effect similar to the controls' jamming as seen by the second pilot. Evidence has been found that the surviving pilot Eduard Prchal did perform the second pilot's duties during the take-off, which he did not reveal at the time of the investigation. Zięborak rejects General Nöel Mason-MacFarlane's opinion that Prchal's mental state during the take-off was the reason for the accident. He then compares Prchal's article written ten years after the accident with the relevant documents from the accident. Not only did Prchal write an untrue description of the accident, but he omitted some details he had earlier mentioned during his meetings with pilots. The differences included details of his injuries mentioned in the article and those reported in the medical examination after the accident. The author considered whether it was possible that Prchal had completely forgotten such details of the accident as for example the number of victims. The reason for these differences, i.e. whether Prchal lied deliberately in his article or suffered from a type of partial amnesia as a result of his injury is not discussed. However, Zięborak thinks that Prchal lied on purpose about the Mae West lifejacket. Despite the deficiencies of the report, the results of the Court's investigations were finally accepted. The author concluded that this was a convenient solution for both the British and Polish government, as the details of VIPs' flight procedure could not be published in the Court's report during the war.

In 2016, the pilot Mieczysław Jan Różycki also undertook the analysis of the Gibraltar crash and accompanying circumstances. He agreed that the aircraft was overloaded and its take-off weight significantly exceeded the limit set by the manufacturer and RAF Transport Command. Violation of weight regulations was, however, tolerated due to wartime transportation difficulties, and pilots were encouraged to take responsibility for flights with overloaded aircraft. Moreover, minor smuggling of scarce goods by flying personnel was widespread and the baggage of important passengers was not checked nor weighed at all. Therefore, pilots had to estimate the weight of the aircraft. The investigation assumed, based on an RAF form, that the weight of the load, including passengers, was 5324 lbs, which led to their conclusion about the take-off weight. According to M. Różycki, however, there are strong indications that the form containing that weight was fabricated by the commission to show that the aircraft was not excessively overloaded. According to this author, based on estimates and comparative data, the actual take-off weight of the aircraft was about 63,000 pounds, and it would have needed over 1600 yards to take-off, while the airstrip in Gibraltar at the time was only 1530 yards long. Only in August 1943 was the new 1800-yard airstrip completed. Moreover, the main problem at this airport was bad weather conditions due to the mountainous environment, sea influences and winds, and accidents often occurred, including two involving other Liberators in 1942 and 1943.

Eduard Prchal himself was an average pilot, and in particular he was not an experienced pilot of heavy transport machines. He was a fighter pilot first and began training on the Liberator only on 22 December 1942. At the time of the accident, he had 292 hours and 10 minutes of flight time with this aircraft type. Co-pilot Stanley Herring, although an experienced bomber pilot, had no experience in solo piloting the Liberator. Liberator aircraft were difficult to fly and did not tolerate errors, which resulted in a high accident rate during training. In addition, aircraft of the first two Liberator production series AL and AM had individual quirks in flight. Prchal and Herring did not know their aircraft AL523 well, and had previously made only one daytime take-off and flight on it. Prchal himself was not Sikorski's personal pilot. Sikorski had flown with him for the first time from England to Cairo, and expressed a wish that Prchal would pilot his aircraft on the way back as well. As a result, Prchal was assigned to Liberator AL523, scheduled for the return trip. Sikorski planned to use his trust in the Czechoslovak pilot for propaganda, to improve harsh relations between the Polish and Czechoslovak governments in exile. After taking off too early, the aircraft started to lose height, and Prchal may have had an impression of jammed elevators due to a gust of wind. The aircraft then came to a stall and crashed within twelve seconds of take-off. In conclusion, the accident, according to Różycki, was a simple disaster caused by taking off in unfavorable weather, from a too-short airstrip, and with an overloaded aircraft - with the Liberator's flight characteristics, the increased difficulty of night take-off, limited pilot experience and lack of knowledge of this particular aircraft's characteristics as contributing factors.

According to Różycki, a primary goal of the British Court of Inquiry was to investigate the possibility of sabotage in Gibraltar, which was of vital importance to other allied commanders and politicians. This issue was investigated most thoroughly and the sabotage was ruled out. Afterwards, determination of the accident's real cause was regarded as less important. In the opinion of Różycki, the final conclusion (that the accident was caused by the jamming of elevator controls of unknown cause) was deliberate understatement, chosen to avoid straining Polish relations with Czechoslovakia by blaming the pilot - and to avoid revealing negligence in transport pilot training and procedures, for which the RAF was responsible.

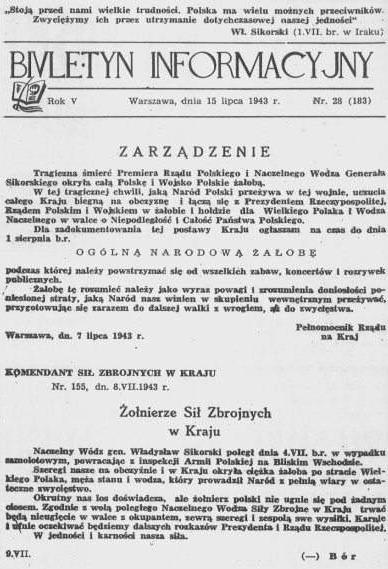
Biuletyn Informacyjny from 15 July 1943 News of the death of General Władysław Sikorski and the order for a national day of mourning.

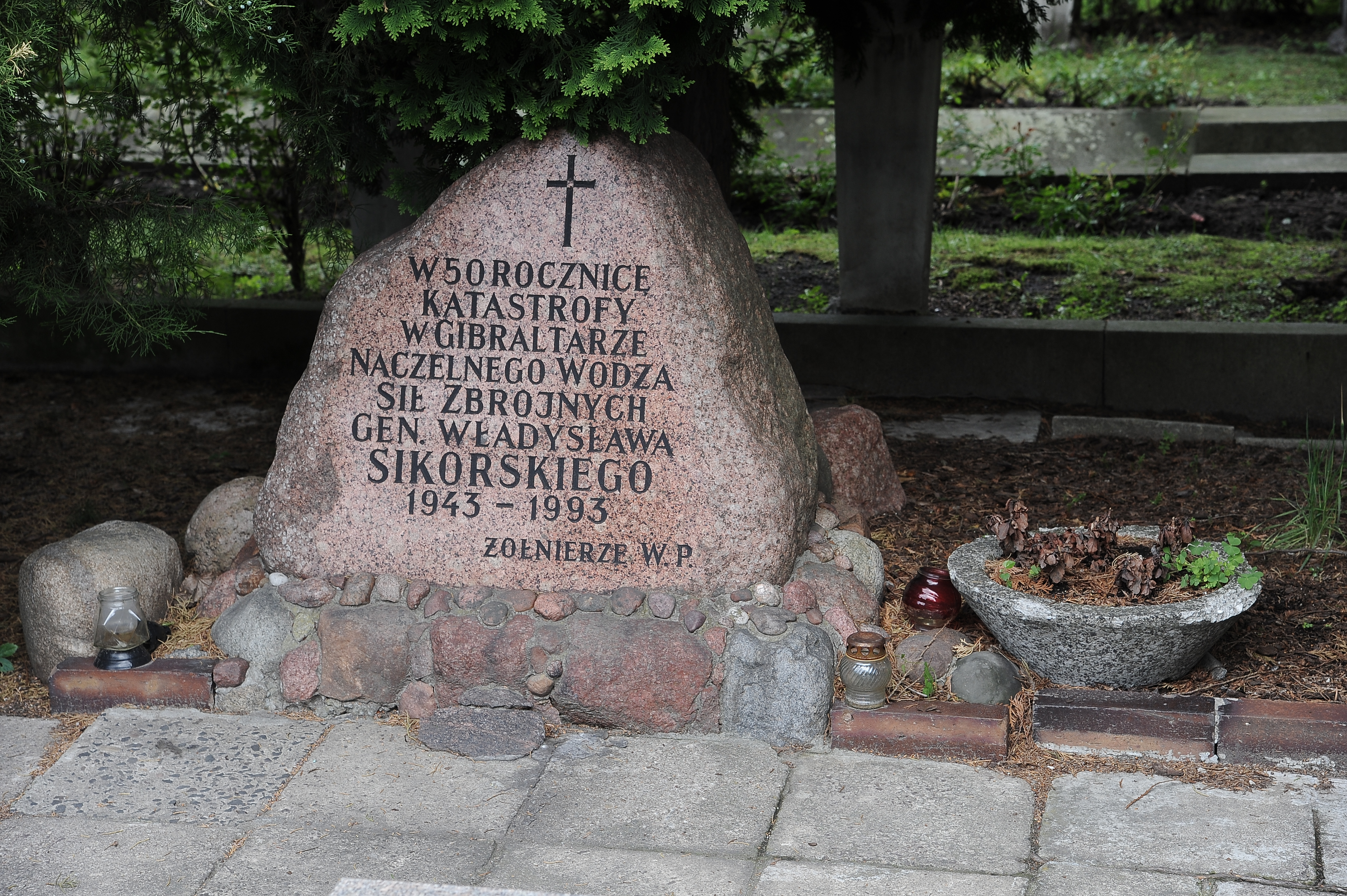
A memorial stone for the 50th anniversary of the 1943 Gibraltar air crash at the Powązki Military Cemetery.

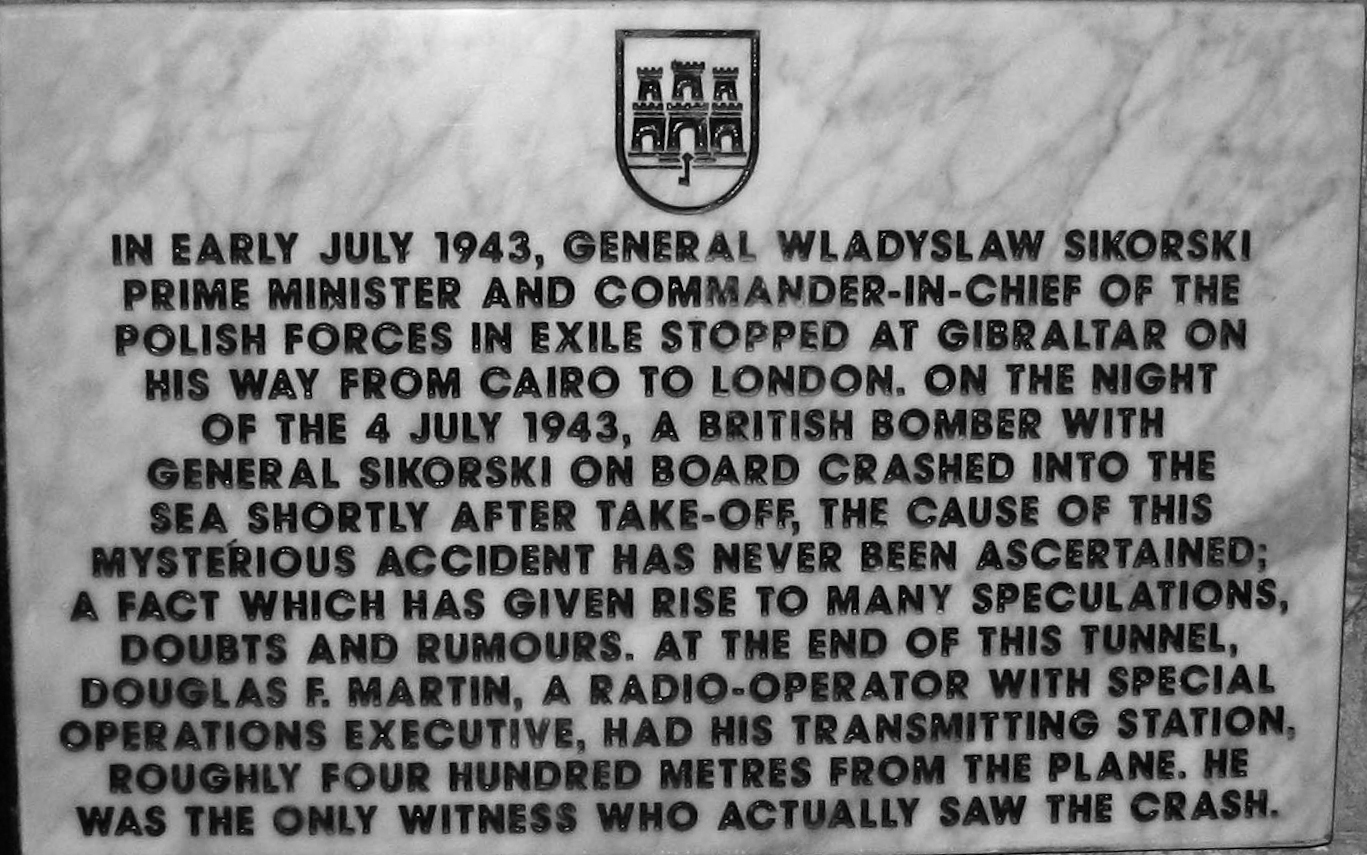
Memorial plaque dedicated to Sikorski located at the end of the Great Siege Tunnels in Gibraltar

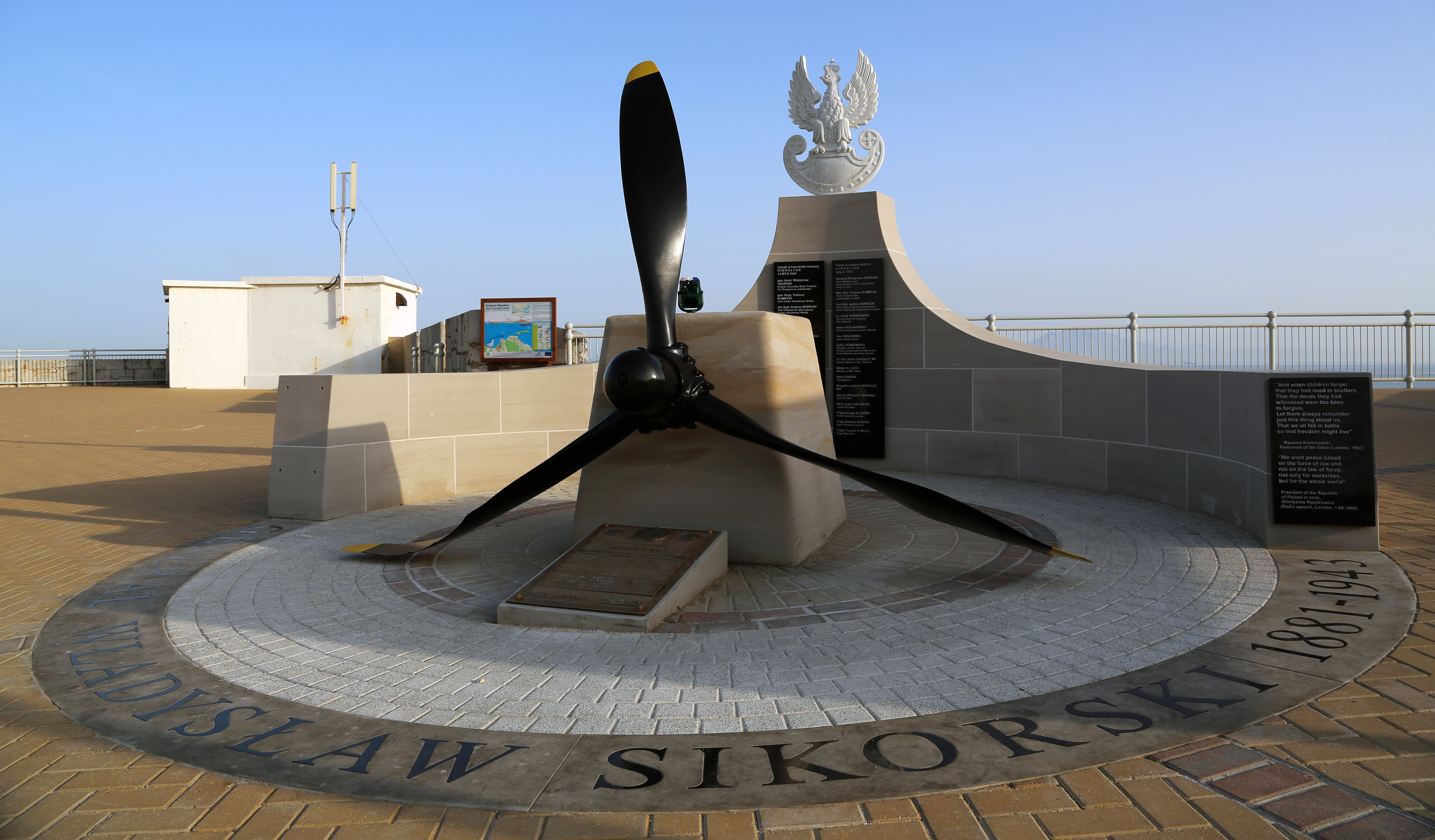
General Sikorski Memorial at Europa Point in Gibraltar

== See also ==
- Military history of Gibraltar during World War II § Death of Władysław Sikorski: 1943
- Smolensk air disaster
- Katastrofa w Gibraltarze (film)
