= Pope Pius XII and Russia =

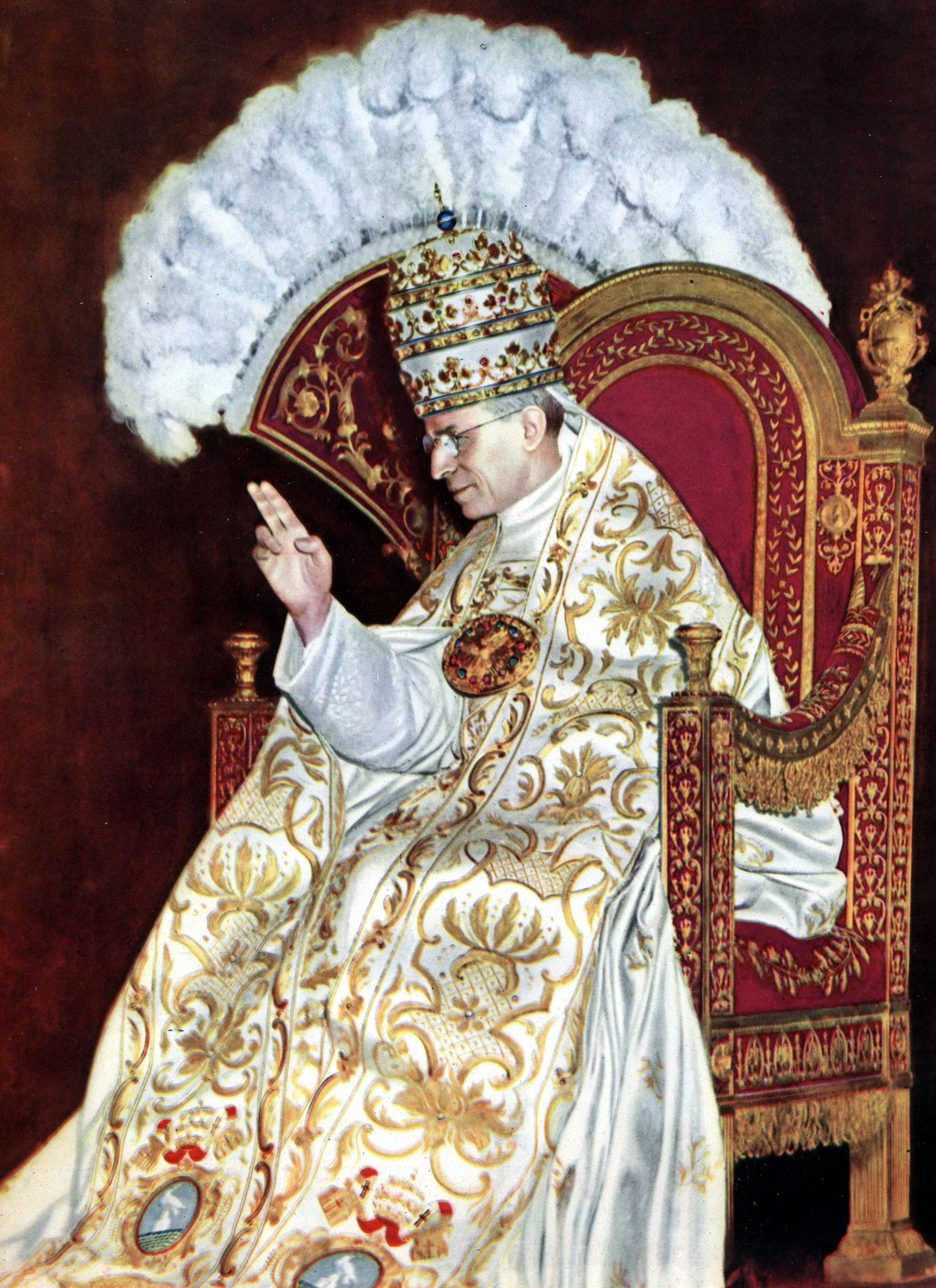
A print of Pope Pius XII

Pope Pius XII and Russia describes relations of the Vatican with the Soviet Union, Russia, the Eastern Orthodox Church, and the Eastern Catholic Churches resulting in the eradication of the Church in most parts of the Soviet Union during the Stalinist era. Most persecutions of the Church occurred during the pontificate of Pope Pius XII.

== Overview ==
The relations of the Vatican with Russia are one element of the topic Persecutions against the Catholic Church and Pope Pius XII. Equally destructive to the Church were the simultaneous persecutions of the Church in China

Relations between Soviet authorities and the Holy See were always difficult, although at times both sides tried to show some flexibility. On January 23, 1918, the Soviet government declared separation of Church and State and began with the systematic dissolution of Catholic institutions and the confiscation of Catholic properties. Two years later, in 1920, Pope Benedict XV issued Bonum Sana in which he condemned the philosophy and practices of communism. Pope Pius XI followed this line with numerous statements and the encyclicals Miserantissimus Redemptor, Caritate Christi, and Divini Redemptoris.

== The War years: 1941–1945 ==
The pontificate of Pius XII faced extraordinary problems. During the 1930s, the public protests and condemnations of his predecessors had not deterred the Soviet authorities from persecuting all Christian churches within the Soviet Union as hostile to Marxism-Leninism. The persecution of the Catholic Church was a part of an overall attempt to eradicate religion in the Soviet Union. In 1940, after Germany occupied the western part of Poland, the Soviet Union annexed the eastern part along with the Baltic Countries including predominantly Catholic Lithuania. Persecution began at once, as large parts of Poland and the Baltic States were incorporated into the USSR. Almost immediately, the United Catholic Churches of Armenia, Ukraine and Ruthenia were attacked. While most Oriental Christians belong to an Orthodox Church, some like the Armenian Catholic Church, Ukrainian Greek Catholic Church and the Ruthenian Church are united with Rome which allowed them to keep their own Oriental liturgy and Church laws.

During the Second World War, Pius XII, upholding the neutrality of the Holy See, had abstained from any criticisms of the Soviet Union as it was attacked by Germany. Contrary to many rumours, the Pope never called the war a crusade against communism, nor did he encourage the extension of the war into the Soviet Union. In his letter to the Russian people Sacro Vergente, he wrote that despite these Church persecutions during the war, he would not utter one word which could have been used unfairly. Despite growing pressure, he never condoned or approved a war against communism or against Russia in 1941. Helping to save lives whenever possible, especially in Soviet and German-occupied Poland, he did not issue protests when the allies in the East engaged in mass killings or deportations during the war.

== The destruction of Catholic Oriental Churches ==
After the war, the Russian Orthodox Church was given some freedom by the government of Joseph Stalin, but not the Orthodox Oriental Churches which was united with Rome. Leaders of the Orthodox Oriental Churches faced intense pressure to break with Rome and unite with Moscow. Pope Pius addressed specifically the Ruthenian Catholic Church located in Ukraine. Ruthenian Catholics call themselves Rusyns. They are closely related to the Ukrainians and speak a dialect of the same language. The traditional Rusyn homeland extends into northeast Slovakia and the Lemko region of southeast Poland. Until 1922, the area was largely a part of Austria-Hungary. After becoming Polish, which follows the Latin rite, Polonisation and significant problems for all Orthodox, including united Christians developed. Some Ruthenians, resisting Polonisation, felt deserted by the Vatican and returned to the Russian Orthodox Church during the Pontificate of Pope Pius XI.

After 1945, it was claimed that the union with Rome was a Polish conspiracy to dominate and wipe out the Oriental culture of the Ukrainian Greek Catholic Church: United orthodox faithful and priests had to suffer under Polish bishops of the Latin Rite and Polonisation. But they were apprehended by the Soviet Army under the leadership of Joseph Stalin, and therefore, continued ties to Rome were made impossible. The new Patriarch Alexius I of Moscow called on all Catholics in the Soviet Union for a separation from Rome:

- Liberate yourself! You must break the Vatican chains, which throw you into the abyss of error, darkness and spiritual decay. Hurry, return to the your true mother, the Russian Orthodox Church!

Pope Pius XII replied: "Who does not know, that Patriarch Alexius I recently elected by the dissident bishops of Russia, openly exalts and preaches defection from the Catholic Church in a letter lately addressed to the Ruthenian Church, a letter which contributes not a little to the persecution?" Pope Pius never shared Roosevelt's wartime optimism regarding Stalin's allegedly changed attitudes towards religious freedom and tolerance and related guarantees from the newly established United Nations. Orientales omnes Ecclesias refers to United Nations resolutions of a world of tolerance, free of religious persecution. Pius continues, "This had given us hope that peace and true liberty would be granted everywhere to the Catholic Church, the more so since the Church has always taught, and teaches, that obedience to the ordinances of the lawfully established civil power, within the sphere and bounds of its authority, is a duty of conscience. But, unfortunately, the events we have mentioned have grievously and bitterly weakened, have almost destroyed, our hope and confidence so far as the lands of the Ruthenians are concerned."

The Pope knew not only about the attempts to separate the United Churches from Rome. He also was aware that in months preceding the encyclical Orientales omnes Ecclesias, all Catholic bishops of the Ukrainian Church had been arrested, including Josyf Slipyj, Gregory Chomysyn, John Laysevkyi, Nicolas Carneckyi, and Josaphat Kocylovskyi. Some, including Bishop Nicetas Budka, perished in Siberia. Subjected to Stalinist Show Trials, they all received severe sentencing. The remaining leaders of the hierarchies and heads of all seminaries and Episcopal offices were arrested and tried in 1945 and 1946. July 1, 1945, some three hundred priests of the United Church wrote to Molotov. They protested the arrest of all bishops and large parts of the Catholic clergy. After the Church was thus robbed of all its leadership, a "spontaneous movement" for separation from Rome, and unification with the Russian Orthodox Church developed. Mass arrests of priests followed. In Lemko, some five hundred priests were jailed in 1945 or sent to a Gulag, officially called, "an unknown destination because of political reasons".

The Catholic Church's public presence in Russia was annihilated. Church institutions were confiscated and expropriated; churches, monasteries and seminaries closed and looted, After the war, the Catholic United Churches were integrated under the Moscow Patriarchy, after all residing bishops and apostolic administrators were arrested on March 6, 1946. The Catholic Church of Ukraine was thus liquidated. All properties were turned over to the Orthodox Church under the Patriarch of Moscow.

After Joseph Stalin died in 1953, "peaceful coexistence" became a subject of numerous discussions. In his Christmas Message of 1954, Pius XII defined possibilities and preconditions for peaceful coexistence. He indicated Vatican willingness to practical cooperation, whenever possible in the interest of the faithful. The slow pace of de-Stalinisation and the Soviet crack-down of the Hungarian Revolution did not produce results, aside from modest improvements in Poland and Yugoslavia after 1956. January 1958, Soviet Foreign Minister Andrey Gromyko expressed willingness of Moscow to have formal relations with the Vatican in light of the position of Pope Pius XII on world peace and the uses of atomic energy for peaceful purposes, a position which he claimed was identical with Kremlin policy. The Vatican did not respond officially, and reported unofficial contacts will not be known until 2028, when Vatican Archives open access to all documents of the pontificate of Pius XII.

== Pope Pius XII on Russia and the Russian Orthodox Church ==
Two months after his election on May 12, 1939, in Singolari Animi, a papal letter to the Sacred Congregation of the Oriental Church, Pius XII reported again the persecutions of the Catholic faith in the Soviet Union. Three weeks later, while honouring the memory of Saint Vladimir on the 950th anniversary of his baptism, he welcomed Ruthenian priests and bishops and members of the Russian colony in Rome, and prayed for those who suffer in their country, awaiting with their tears the hour of the coming of the Lord.

The encyclical Orientales omnes Ecclesias is a summary of the relations between the united oriental churches and Rome until the persecutions of 1945. Pope Pius presents a comprehensive historical review of the reunion, to show the many trials and bloody persecutions but also the advantages of the union to the faithful in Ukraine. In Sacro Vergente this history is repeated with a view to relations with Russia in general. He again rejects communism but not communists. Those who err, are always welcome. At Saint Josaphat College he mourns the terrible changes of the past twenty years in Russia, bishops incarcerated, in concentration camps, banned from their homes, killed while in jail, for one reason only, they are faithful to the Holy See.

Orientales Ecclesias reviews the efforts of the Vatican at improving relations with the oriental churches. Pope Pius XII mentions the naming of the first ever Oriental Cardinal Grégoire-Pierre Agagianian, and the reform of the Eastern Canon Law as two examples. But the most flourishing Christian communities are wiped out without trace these days. He does not know details except that many bishops and priests are deported to unknown destinations, to concentration camps and to jails, while some are under house arrest. In Bulgaria, Bishop Bossilkoff was executed with many others. But Bulgaria is not alone. Many are robbed of the most basic natural and human rights, and mistreated in the most extreme ways. The suffering in Ukraine is immense. The Pope refers specifically to the Kiev show trial against bishops of the oriental Church. Still there is reason for comfort and hope: The strength of the faithful. The Christian faith makes better citizens, who use their God-given freedom to work for their societies to further the causes of justice and unity. The Pope concludes by requesting worldwide public prayers for the persecuted, and hopes that they will open the jails and loosen the chains in those countries.

Novimus Nos is a letter to the bishops of the Oriental rite asking for faith, strength and hope. The Pope expresses his ardent desire for unity of all Eastern Christians with the Western church and comforts those who suffer in jail or unknown locations for their faith and faithfulness to the Holy See. In Fulgens corona, dedicated to the 100th anniversary of the dogma of the Immaculate Conception of the Virgin Mary, Pope Pius reminds the whole world of the sufferings and persecutions in Russia and dedicates her to the special protection of Mary, who has so many Russian followers.

- Communications pertinent to Russia and the Russian Orthodox Church
  - 1. Singulari Animi, Apostolic Letter, May 12, 1939, AAS 1939, 258
  - 2. The 950th Anniversary of the Baptism of St Wladimir, Discorsi 1939, 163
  - 3. Orientales omnes Ecclesias, Encyclical, AAS 1946, 33
  - 4. Sempiternus Rex, Encyclical, September 8, 1951, AAS 1951, 624
  - 5. Sacro Vergente, Apostolic letter, July 7, 1952, AAS 1952, 505
  - 6. Speech to the St. Josaphat College, December 15, 1952, AAS 1952, 876
  - 7. Orientales Ecclesias, encyclical, December 15, 1952, AAS 1953, 5
  - 8. Novimus Nos, Apostolic Letter, January 20, 1956, AAS 1956, 260
  - 9. Fulgens corona encyclical, September 8, 1954, AAS 1954, 577

== Operation Seat 12 - KGB disinformation campaign to impugn Pius ==
Seat 12 also known as Operation Seat 12 was a disinformation campaign of communist propaganda during the Cold War to discredit the moral authority of the Vatican because of its outspoken anti-communism. In February 1960, Nikita Khrushchev authorized a covert plan to discredit the Vatican's moral authority in Western Europe with a campaign of disinformation due to its fervent anticommunism, Venerable Pope Pius XII being the prime target. The motto of Seat 12 was "Dead men cannot defend themselves" since Pius died in 1958.

The alleged plot was first described by Ion Mihai Pacepa, a Romanian general who headed the secret service before defecting in 1978 (the highest ranking intelligence officer ever to defect from the Warsaw Pact). He claimed that General Ivan Agayants, chief of the KGB's disinformation department, created the outline for what was to become a play mischaracterizing the Pope as a Nazi sympathizer, The Deputy, and that the purported research for the play consisted of forgeries; also that the research was done not by its claimed author Rolf Hochhuth but by KGB agents and that the play's producer, Erwin Piscator, founder of the Proletarian Theater in Berlin who had sought asylum in the USSR during the war, was a devout Communist who had long established ties with the USSR. The play had its debut at East Berlin's Freie Volksbühne ("Free People's Theater"). The play toured the Eastern Bloc and then proceeded to tour the free world.

=== See also ===
- Persecution of Christians in the Soviet Union
- Persecution of Christians in Warsaw Pact countries

== Sources ==
- Acta Apostolicae Sedis (AAS), Rome, Vatican 1922–1960
- Owen Chadwick, The Christian Church in the Cold War, London 1993
- Richard Cardinal Cushing, Pope Pius XII, St. Paul Editions, Boston, 1959
- Victor Dammertz OSB, "Ordensgemeinschaften und Säkularinstitute", in Handbuch der Kirchengeschichte, VII, Herder Freiburg, 1979, 355–380
- A Galter, Rotbuch der verfolgten Kirchen, Paulus Verlag, Recklinghausen, 1957,
- Alberto Giovannetti, Pio XII parla alla Chiesa del Silenzio, Edition Ancona, Milan, 1959, German translation, Der Papst spricht zur Kirche des Schweigens, Paulus Verlag, Recklinghausen, 1959
- "Herder Korrespondenz" Orbis Catholicus, Freiburg, 1946–1961
- Pio XII Discorsi e Radiomessagi, Rome, Vatican, 1939–1959,
- Jan Olav Smit, Pope Pius XII, London Burns Oates & Washbourne LTD,1951
