= Eastern Catholic victims of Soviet persecutions =

Eastern Catholic victims of Soviet persecutions include bishops and others among the tens of thousands of victims of Soviet persecutions from 1918 to approximately 1980, under the state ideology of Marxist–Leninist atheism.

== During the Second World War ==
Two months after his election on May 12, 1939, in Singolari Animi, a papal letter to the Sacred Congregation of the Oriental Church, Pius XII reported again the persecutions of the Catholic faith in the Soviet Union. Three weeks later, while honouring the memory of Saint Vladimir on the 950th anniversary of his baptism, he welcomed Ruthenian priests and bishops and members of the Russian colony in Rome, and prayed for those who suffer in their country, awaiting with their tears the hour of the coming of the Lord.

== Suppression of Eastern Catholic Churches by Stalin ==
=== Ruthenian Church ===
During and after World War II, the Russian Orthodox Church was eventually given some forms of freedom by the atheist government of Joseph Stalin, which held to the doctrine of Marxist–Leninist atheism. However, the Eastern Catholic (also called Oriental) Churches which were united with Rome, were persecuted. Leaders of the Eastern Byzantine Catholic Churches faced intense pressure to break with Rome and unite with Moscow. Pope Pius addressed specifically the Ruthenian Catholic Church located in Ukraine. Some Ruthenian Catholics call themselves Rusyns. They speak a dialect of the Ukrainian language. The traditional Rusyn homeland extends into northeast Slovakia and the Lemko region of southeast Poland. Until 1922, the area was largely a part of Austria-Hungary. After much of the area was added to Poland, which follows the Latin rite, Polonisation and significant problems for all Orthodox and Uniate Christians developed. Some Ruthenians, resisting Polonisation, felt deserted by the Vatican and returned to the Russian Orthodox Church during the Pontificate of Pope Pius XI.

=== Ukrainian Greek Catholic Church ===
After 1945, it was claimed that the Union of Brest was a Polish conspiracy to dominate and wipe out the Oriental culture of the Ukrainian Greek Catholic Church. Uniate and Orthodox faithful and clergy had to suffer under Polish bishops of the Latin Rite and Polonisation, but were liberated by the Soviet Army under the leadership of Joseph Stalin and therefore, continued ties to Rome were no longer necessary.

=== Role of Russian Orthodox Patriarch ===
The new Patriarch, Alexius I of Moscow called on all Catholics in the Soviet Union for a separation from Rome:

Liberate yourself! You must break the Vatican chains, which throw you into the abyss of error, darkness and spiritual decay. Hurry, return to your true mother, the Russian Orthodox Church!

Pope Pius XII replied: "Who does not know, that Patriarch Alexius I recently elected by the dissident bishops of Russia, openly exalts and preaches defection from the Catholic Church. In a letter lately addressed to the Ruthenian Church, a letter, which contributed not a little to the persecution?".

=== Orientales omnes Ecclesias ===
Orientales omnes Ecclesias refers to United Nations resolutions of a world of tolerance, free of religious persecution. Pius continues, "This had given us hope that peace and true liberty would be granted everywhere to the Catholic Church, the more so since the Church has always taught, and teaches, that obedience to the ordinances of the lawfully established civil power, within the sphere and bounds of its authority, is a duty of conscience. But, unfortunately, the events we have mentioned have grievously and bitterly weakened, have almost destroyed, our hope and confidence so far as the lands of the Ruthenians are concerned."

The Pope knew about the attempts to separate the Uniate churches from Rome, and was also aware, that in months preceding the encyclical Orientales omnes Ecclesias, all Catholic bishops of the Ukrainian Church had been arrested. Josyf Slipyj, Gregory Chomysyn, John Laysevkyi, Nicolas Carneckyi, Josaphat Kocylovskyi Some, including Bishop Nicetas Budka perished in Siberia.

=== Show trials ===
Subjected to Stalinist show trials, they all received severe sentencing. The remaining leaders of the hierarchies and heads of all seminaries and Episcopal offices were arrested and tried in 1945 and 1946. July 1, 1945, some three hundred priests of the United Church wrote to Molotov. They protested the arrest of all bishops and large parts of the Catholic clergy. After the Church was thus robbed of all its leadership, a "spontaneous movement" for separation from Rome, and unification with the Russian Orthodox Church developed. Mass arrests of priests followed. In Lemko, some five hundred priests were jailed in 1945 or sent to a Gulag, officially called, "an unknown destination because of political reasons".

=== Subsequent confiscation of properties ===
The Catholic Church was annihilated, Church institutions were confiscated and expropriated; churches, monasteries and seminaries closed and looted. After the war, the Catholic Uniate churches were integrated under the Moscow Patriarchy, after all residing bishops and apostolic administrators were arrested on March 6, 1946. The Catholic Church of Ukraine was thus liquidated. All properties were turned over to the Orthodox Church under the Patriarch of Moscow.

=== Persecuted priests & bishops ===
Persectured priests and bishops include:

- Nykyta Budka
- Walter Ciszek
- Potapy Emelianov
- Leonid Feodorov
- Clement Sheptytsky
- Josyf Slipyj
- Vasyl Velychkovsky
- Theodore Romzha
- Hryhorij Khomyshyn

== Papal encyclicals on the persecution ==
The encyclical Orientales omnes Ecclesias is a summary of the relations between the Uniated (Eastern) churches and Rome until the persecutions 1945. Pope Pius XII presents a comprehensive historical review of the reunion, to show the many trials and bloody persecutions but also the advantages of the union to the faithful in Ukraine. In Sacro Vergente, this history is repeated with view to relations with Russia in general. He again rejects communism but not communists. Those who err, are always welcome. At Saint Josaphat College he mourns the terrible changes of the past twenty years in Russia, bishops incarcerated, in concentration camps, banned from their homes, killed while in jail, for one reason only, they are faithful to the Holy See.

Orientales Ecclesias reviews the efforts of the Vatican of improving relations with the oriental Churches. Pope Pius XII mentions the naming of an Oriental Cardinal Grégoire-Pierre Agagianian, and the reform of the Eastern Canon Law as two examples. But the most flourishing Christian communities are wiped out without trace these days. He does not know details except that many bishops and priests are deported to unknown destinations, to concentration camps and to jails, while some are under house arrest. AAS 1952, Orientales Ecclesias 5 In Bulgaria, Bishop Bossilkoff was executed with many others. But Bulgaria is not alone. Many are robbed of the most basic natural and human rights, and mistreated in the most extreme ways. The suffering in Ukraine is immense. The Pope refers specifically to the Kiev show trial against bishops of the oriental Church. Still there is reason for comfort and hope: The strength of the faithful. The Christian faith makes better citizens, who use their God-given freedom to work for their societies to further the causes of justice and unity. The Pope concludes by requesting worldwide public prayers for the persecuted, and hopes that they may open the jails and loosen the chains in those countries.

Novimus Nos is a letter to the bishops of the Oriental rite asking for faith, strength and hope. The Pope expresses his ardent desire for unity of all Eastern Christians with the Western church and comforts those who suffer in jail or unknown locations for their faith and faithfulness to the Holy See. In Fulgens corona, dedicated to 100th anniversary of the dogma of the Immaculate Conception of the Virgin Mary, Pope Pius reminds the whole world of the sufferings and persecutions in Russia and dedicates her to the special protection of Mary, who has so many Russian followers.

1. Singulari Animi, Apostolic Letter, May 12, 1939, AAS 1939, 258
2. The 950th Anniversary of the Baptism of St Wladimir, Discorsi 1939, 163
3. Orientales omnes Ecclesias, Encyclical, AAS 1946, 33
4. Sempiternus Rex, Encyclical, September 8, 1951, AAS 1951, 624
5. Sacro Vergente, Apostolic letter, July 7, 1952, AAS 1952, 505
6. Speech to the St. Josaphat College, December 15, 1952, AAS 1952, 876
7. Orientales Ecclesias, encyclical, December 15, 1952, AAS 1953, 5
8. Novimus Nos, apostolic letter, January 20, 1956, AAS 1956, 260
9. Fulgens corona encyclical, September 8, 1954, AAS 1954, 577

== Destalinization period ==
After Joseph Stalin died in 1953, "peaceful coexistence" became subject of numerous discussions. In his Christmas Message of 1954, Pius XII defined possibilities and preconditions for peaceful coexistence. He indicated Vatican willingness to practical cooperation, whenever possible in the interest of the faithful. The slow pace of de-Stalinisation and the Soviet crackdown on the Hungarian Revolution did not produce results, aside from modest improvements in Poland and Yugoslavia after 1956. January 1958, Soviet Foreign Minister Andrey Gromyko expressed willingness of Moscow, to have formal relations with the Vatican in light of the position of Pope Pius XII on World peace and the uses of atomic energy for peaceful purposes, a position, which he claimed was identical with Kremlin policy. The Vatican did not respond officially, and reported unofficial contacts will not be known until 2028, when Vatican Archives open access to all documents of the pontificate of Pius XII.

== See also ==
- Persecutions of the Catholic Church and Pius XII
- Persecution of Christians in the Soviet Union
- Persecution of Christians in Warsaw Pact countries
