= Communist propaganda =

Promotion of the ideology of communism

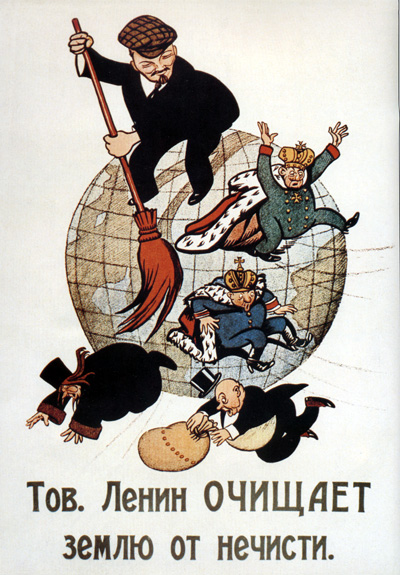
"Comrade Lenin Cleanses the Earth of Filth" by Viktor Deni, 1920

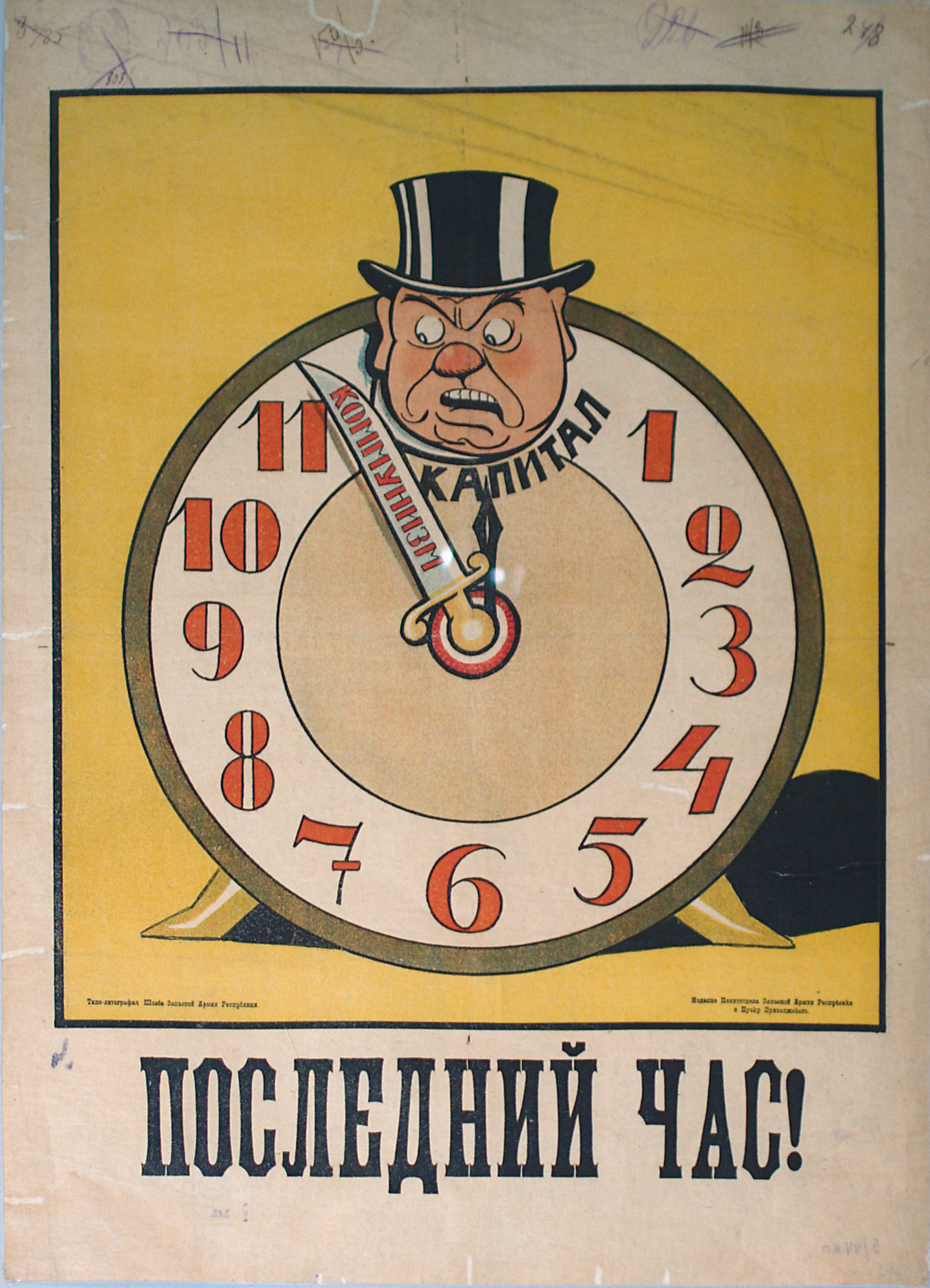
Clock hand labeled "communism" about to cut off a top-hatted and brandy-nosed caricature head labeled "Capital" as the caption reads "The final hour!"

Communist propaganda is the artistic and social promotion of the ideology of communism, communist worldview, communist society, and interests of the communist movement. While it tends to carry a negative connotation in the Western world, the term propaganda broadly refers to any publication or campaign aimed at promoting a cause and is/was used for official purposes by most communist-oriented governments. The term may also refer to political parties' opponents' campaign. Rooted in Marxist thought, the propaganda of communism is viewed by its proponents as the vehicle for spreading their idea of enlightenment of working class people and pulling them away from the propaganda of who they view to be their oppressors, that they claim reinforces exploitation, such as organized religion or consumerism. Communist propaganda therefore stands in opposition to bourgeois or capitalist propaganda.

In The ABC of Communism, Bolshevik theoretician Nikolai Bukharin wrote: "The State propaganda of communism becomes in the long run a means for the eradication of the last traces of bourgeois propaganda dating from the old régime; and it is a powerful instrument for the creation of a new ideology, of new modes of thought, of a new outlook on the world."

== Theoretical origins ==
The Great Soviet Encyclopedia defines communist propaganda as being the expression of the essential worldview of the working class and its natural aims and interests defined by its historical position as the social force which will ultimately usher in the epoch of communism.

According to communist theory, the history of all society has been the history of class struggle and with each phase of this struggle comes a new set of social relationships that dictate the direction of society's development and, fundamentally, the system of producing and distributing goods and services. Arising from the creation of surplus during the Neolithic Revolution, the unequal distribution of this surplus has been reinforced by the state which represents the interests of the ruling class of the time. While all societies and civilizations have had their own unique history of development, they each pass through six distinctive stages of economic relationships sharing common characteristics, these being: primitive communism (hunter-gatherer societies), slavery, feudalism, capitalism, socialism, and finally a return to communism in a highly advanced form which is considered to be the epoch of humanity having become fully civilized.

Communist propaganda accordingly serves the same purpose as all its predecessor propaganda: to ideologically enforce the legitimacy of the working class (those who derive a living from selling their labor) as the ruling class of society. Within this context, the main counter-propaganda is bourgeois propaganda, or propaganda that promotes the rule of the capitalist class (those who derive a living from privately owning property and capital assets). Communist propaganda is defined as a scientifically based system of the dissemination of the communist ideology with the purpose of education, training and organizing of the masses.

== Purposes ==
The Great Soviet Encyclopedia identifies the following functions of communist propaganda:

- The link of the Communist Party with the working class and other working people
- Incorporation of scientific socialism into the worker movements and revolutionary activities of the masses
- Unification and organization of national divisions of the workers', communist, and democratic movements
- Coordination of the activities of the above-mentioned movements, exchange of information and experience
- Expression of the public opinion of the working class, working people, their needs and interests
- Spread opposition to the bourgeois and revisionist propaganda
- Dissemination of statistical data about socialist society (i.e., the one of a communist state).

== Targets ==
As a common trait of any propaganda and its analogue, advertising, communist propaganda's goals and techniques are tuned according to the target audience. The most broad classification of targets is:

- Domestic propaganda of the communist states
- External propaganda of the communist states
- Propaganda of the communist supporters outside the communist states

A more detailed list would be

- Members of the communist party and other groups that support communism: Communist propaganda is often directed at people who already support communism, in an effort to strengthen their commitment to the cause and to motivate them to work towards achieving the goals of the movement.
- The general population: Communist propaganda is also often directed at the general population, in an effort to persuade people to support communism and to encourage them to join the communist party or other communist organizations.
- Opponents of communism: Communist propaganda may also be directed at people who are opposed to communism, in an effort to sway their opinions and to convince them to support the ideology.
- Other countries: Communist propaganda may also be directed at people in other countries, in an effort to promote the ideology and to build support for communist movements in those countries.

A more detailed classification of specific targets (workers, peasants, youth, women, etc.) may be found in the Communist Party documents, usually presented at the Congresses of the Communist Party.

Overall, the main goal of communist propaganda is to spread the ideology of communism and to build support for the movement, both within the country where it is being disseminated and internationally.

== Techniques ==
=== Use of Marxist ideology ===
The creation of the Soviet Union was presented as the most important turning event in human history, based on the Marxist theory of historical materialism. This theory identified means of production as chief determinants of the historical process. They led to the creation of social classes, and class struggle was the 'motor' of history. The sociocultural evolution of societies had to progress inevitably from slavery, through feudalism and capitalism to communism. Furthermore, the Communist Party of the Soviet Union became the protagonist of history, as a "vanguard of the working class", according to development of this theory by Vladimir Lenin. Hence the unlimited powers of the Communist Party leaders were claimed to be as infallible and inevitable as the history itself. It also followed that a worldwide victory of communist countries is inevitable.

Class struggle played a central role in the social policies of the USSR and socialist countries, all of which constitutionally outlined the supremacy of the working class in dictating society's development towards communism. Other classes with interests hostile to those of the working class were subjected to repression. This primarily focused on capitalists, including anyone who derived their living from privately owning property or capital assets. In the USSR, which was founded on a class alliance between workers and peasants, a neo-capitalist class emerged by the 1930s as a result of the New Economic Policy introduced after the end of the civil war. Among the peasants, this new class (called Kulaks) accumulated disproportionately large amounts of wealth through merchant trading and small capital practices. Under Joseph Stalin, the government began to crack down on the Kulaks, to which their resistance was met with violent repression in what could arguably be considered a second civil war. Kulaks who resisted the socialization of their assets, along with anyone who collaborated with or fought for them, were punished with imprisonment, deportation to Siberia, or even execution. Lev Kopelev, who was personally involved in actions against villagers deprived of food for collaborating with Kulaks explained his motivation:

It was excruciating to see and hear all this. And even worse to take part in it.... And I persuaded myself, explained to myself. I must not give in to debilitating pity. We were realizing historical necessity. We were performing our revolutionary duty. We were obtaining grain for our socialist Fatherland. For the Five Year Plan. Our goal was the universal triumph of the Communism, and for the sake of that goal everything was permissible - to lie, to steal, to destroy hundreds of thousands and even millions of people... everyone who stood in the way.

The violence that characterized the forced collectivization of agriculture in the Soviet Union eventually ended in the final years of the 1930s with the defeat of the Kulaks and their demise. By the 1950s, agriculture was entirely collectivized and the peasantry ceased to exist, as all agricultural workers held the same essential social relationship to their means of production as other industrial workers thus making them part of a working class.

=== Polarized values ===
While somewhat modified since the times of the détente, communist propaganda is centered around a number of polarized dichotomies: virtues of the communist world vs. vices of the capitalist world, such as:

- communists are for peace; capitalists are for war
- communists are for mutual cooperation; capitalists are for coercive exploitation
- communists are for democracy; capitalists are for oligarchy

Still another polarization was focused on the real and alleged essence of various terms, such as "freedom", "democracy", often counterpointing, e.g., "bourgeois democracy" vs. "true democracy" or "people's democracy". The latter term is seen in the expression "countries of people's democracy" as applied to what are called "communist states" in the West.

=== Self-criticism ===
According to Jacques Ellul's book Propaganda: The Formation of Men's Attitudes complete propaganda can only be achieved when it is able to win over the adversary, or at least integrate it into the new frame of reference created by propaganda. This was achieved by Soviet propaganda in the self-criticism of its opponents so that the enemy of a regime can be made to declare, while still the enemy, that the regime was right and any opposition was criminal. The enemy accepts their condemnation as just and converts to a supporter of the regime as a result of totalitarian propaganda.

== Means ==
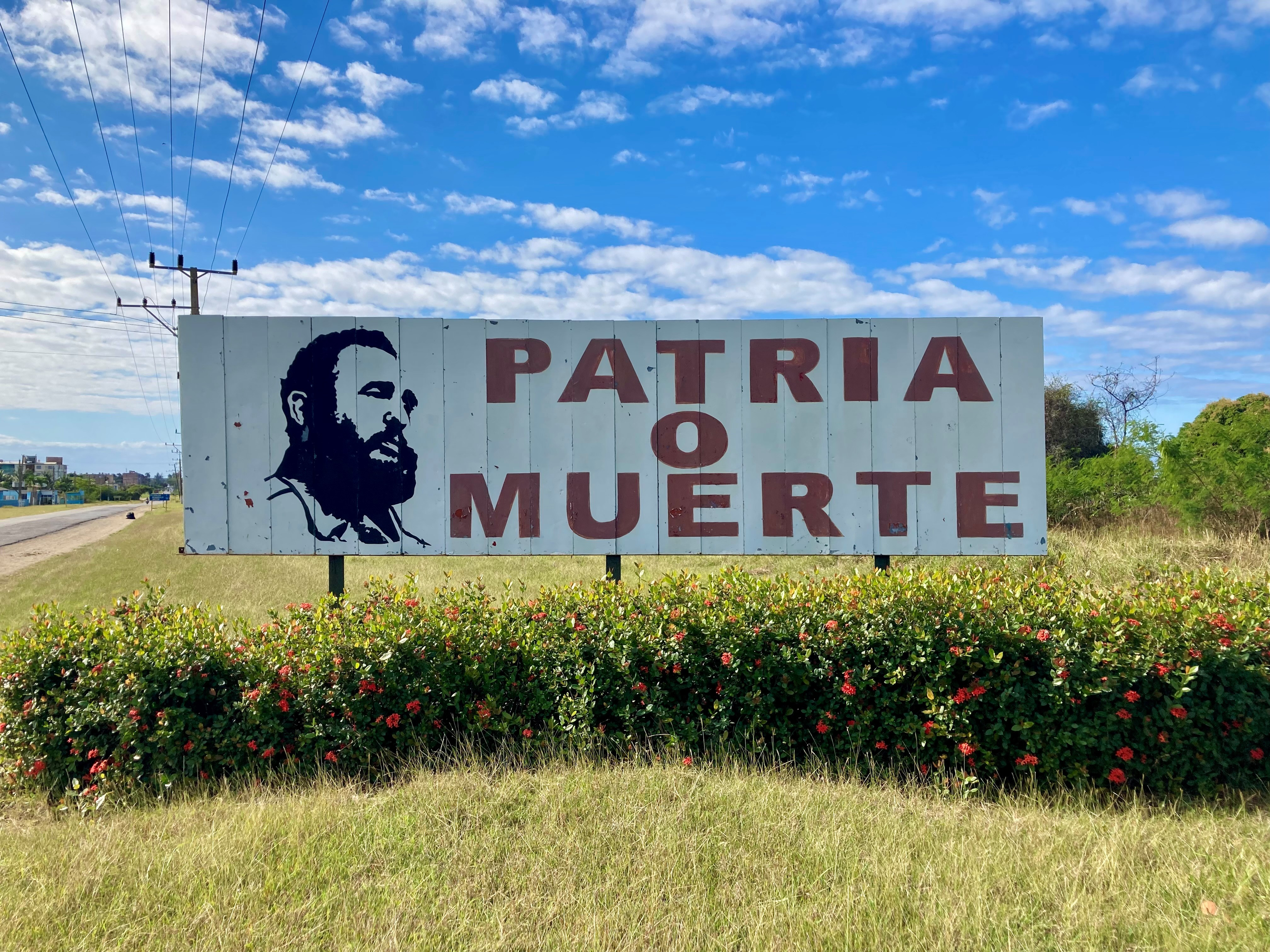
Communist propaganda in Cuba

Communist propaganda is circulated in a variety of ways, ranging from the traditional to the contemporary. The most common form of communist propaganda is the use of newspapers, magazines, and books. These are used to spread political messages and ideologies to the public, as well as spread news and information about the state of the country. Communist leaders also often use the power of public speaking to spread their message to the masses. This can be done through rallies and speeches, as well as through television, radio, and other media. In addition to traditional methods, communist propaganda is also circulated through social media. Platforms such as Twitter, Facebook, Instagram, and YouTube are all used to spread political messages and ideologies. This can be done by creating content that supports the party line, or by using the platform to spread news about the party's successes. Additionally, social media can be used to share images and videos that support the party's beliefs. Another common method of spreading communist propaganda is through the use of posters, banners, and artwork. These can be placed in public places such as parks, squares, and universities. By doing this, communist messages and ideologies can be seen and spread to a larger audience. Finally, communist propaganda is also spread through the use of films, music, and literature. Films and music are used to create a sense of nostalgia, while literature can be used to spread political messages and ideologies. Additionally, films and music can be used to showcase the party's successes and encourage people to join the cause.

=== Communist manuals ===
During the years 1938–1953 the History of the CPSU(B). Short Course was an obligatory explanation of Soviet ideology. The book was translated into many languages.

=== Communist periodicals ===
A number of periodicals were printed by communist states, either exclusively for distribution abroad or with versions tailored for foreign audiences. While the Soviet Union and communist China were the major contributors, other communist states contributed their share as well. The lists below are for early 1960s compiled by J. Clews. The list contains mostly English language titles, but many of these journals were edited in many languages.

==== Soviet Union ====
- Culture and Life
- International Affairs
- Moscow News
- The New Times
- Oeuvres et opinions
- Soviet Film
- Soviet Literature
- Soviet Union
- Soviet Woman, in Arabic, Bengali, Chinese, French, German, Hindi, Hungarian, Japanese, Korean and Spanish
- Femmes de nous jours
- Sputnik - not allowed in GDR and Cuba during glasnost.

==== People's Republic of China ====
- China Pictorial
- China Reconstructs
- Peking Review
- People's China
- China's Sports
- Women in China
- Evergreen

==== Other ====
(Partial list)

- Arabic
- People's Republic of Poland
  - Daily News
  - Demokratis
  - Polish Review
- Chile
  - Acción Proletaria
  - El Siglo
  - Remolino Popular
- Czechoslovakia
  - In the Heart of Europe
  - Czechoslovak Life
  - Czechoslovak Woman
- Bulgaria
  - Bulgaria Today
  - New Bulgaria (in English, French, Arabic)
- East Germany
  - Al Najallah (for Arabic-speaking countries)
  - GDR REview
  - Democratic German Report
  - Jena Review
  - Saut- as-Sadaka (Arabic)
  - Voix de l'Amitie (French, for Africa)
  - Picture News (English, for Asia)
  - Echo d'Allemagne (French)
- North Korea
  - Korea Today
  - Democratic People's Republic of Korea
- Socialist Republic of Romania
  - Scînteia

=== Radio broadcasting ===
A 1952 article, "Communist broadcasts to Italy", reported that as of June 1952 the total communist radio broadcast to Italy amounted to 78 hours per week, as compared to 23 hours of the Voice of America and BBC, noting that Italy occupied a pivotal position in the East–West conflict of the time. These broadcasts originated not only from Moscow, but also from the countries of the Soviet Bloc, as well as from fake "underground resistance" radios probably located within the Soviet Bloc as well rather than in the West.

=== Film and stage ===
Soviet leaders believed that film was an important tool of propaganda (see Cinema of the Soviet Union). Soviet films helped to create the legends of the revolution: The Battleship Potemkin, October: Ten Days That Shook the World, and The End of St. Petersburg. Roman Karmen was a war cameraman and film director and one of the most influential figures in documentary film making. Obyknovennyy fashizm (Common Fascism aka A Night of Thoughts or Triumph Over Violence) (1965) by Mikhail Romm described totalitarian propaganda on the example of Nazism.

In 2007 a high ranking intelligence officer and defector from the Eastern Bloc, Ion Mihai Pacepa, stated that in February 1960, Nikita Khrushchev authorized a covert plan (known as Seat 12) to discredit the Vatican because of its strong anti-communist stance, with Pope Pius XII as the prime target. As part of that plan General Ivan Agayants, chief of the KGB's disinformation department, allegedly created the outline for what was to become the play, The Deputy, which, although fictional, purports to cast doubt on the Pontiff's moral credibility with regard to the Holocaust.

=== International organizations, congresses and festivals ===
During the Cold War the World Festivals of Youth and Students were held, with some exceptions, in capitals of communist states and were a powerful tool of communist propaganda.

=== Education ===
Education in the communist states included a considerable amount of indoctrination, both in special political and philosophical courses and in properly crafted courses of general education: history, geography, world literature, etc. Soviet ideology was taught in the Soviet Union divided into three disciplines: scientific communism, Marxism-Leninism (mostly in the form of Leninism) and communist political economy and was introduced as part of many courses, e.g., teaching Marx' or Lenin's views on topics of science or history. The Soviet format of education was imposed (with varying success) onto other satellite states.

=== Culture and arts ===
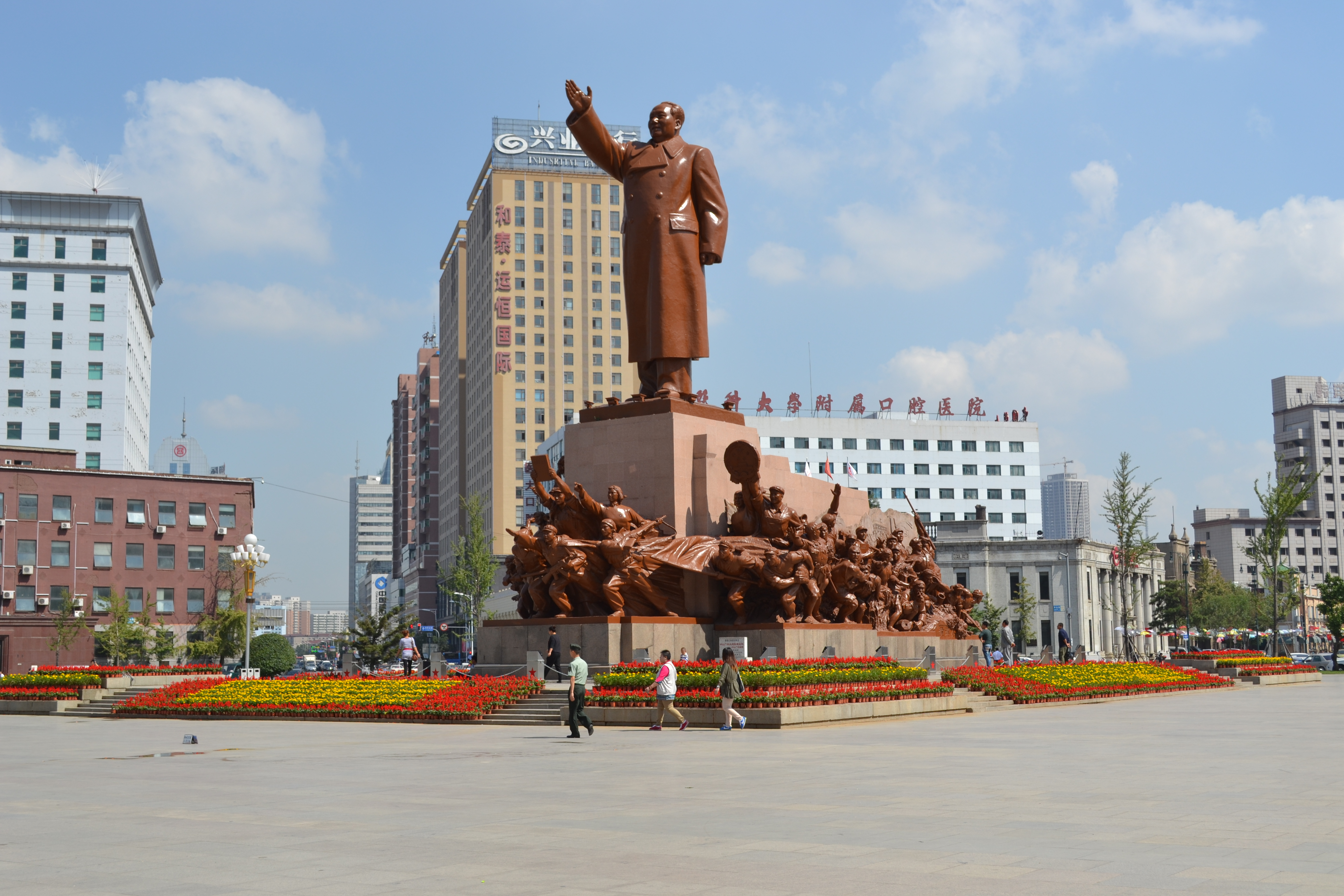
Statue of Mao Zedong in Shenyang

From the early days of the first communist-ruled state, Soviet Russia, arts were recognized as a powerful means of propaganda and placed under strict control and censorship in all communist states. Lenin and Joseph Stalin were the preferred subjects, although almost all of Stalin's images and monuments were removed and/or destroyed after his death in 1953.

Kukryniksy were three propaganda caricaturists/cartoonists, who attacked all enemies of the Soviet Union.

=== Financial means ===
J. Clews cites German, French and British estimates of the early 1960s on the amount of money spent in the world for communist propaganda and political activities in the non-communist world, estimating to about $2 billion, i.e., about $2 per person outside the communists states, with major spenders being the Soviet Union and the People's Republic of China.

== Perception in the West ==
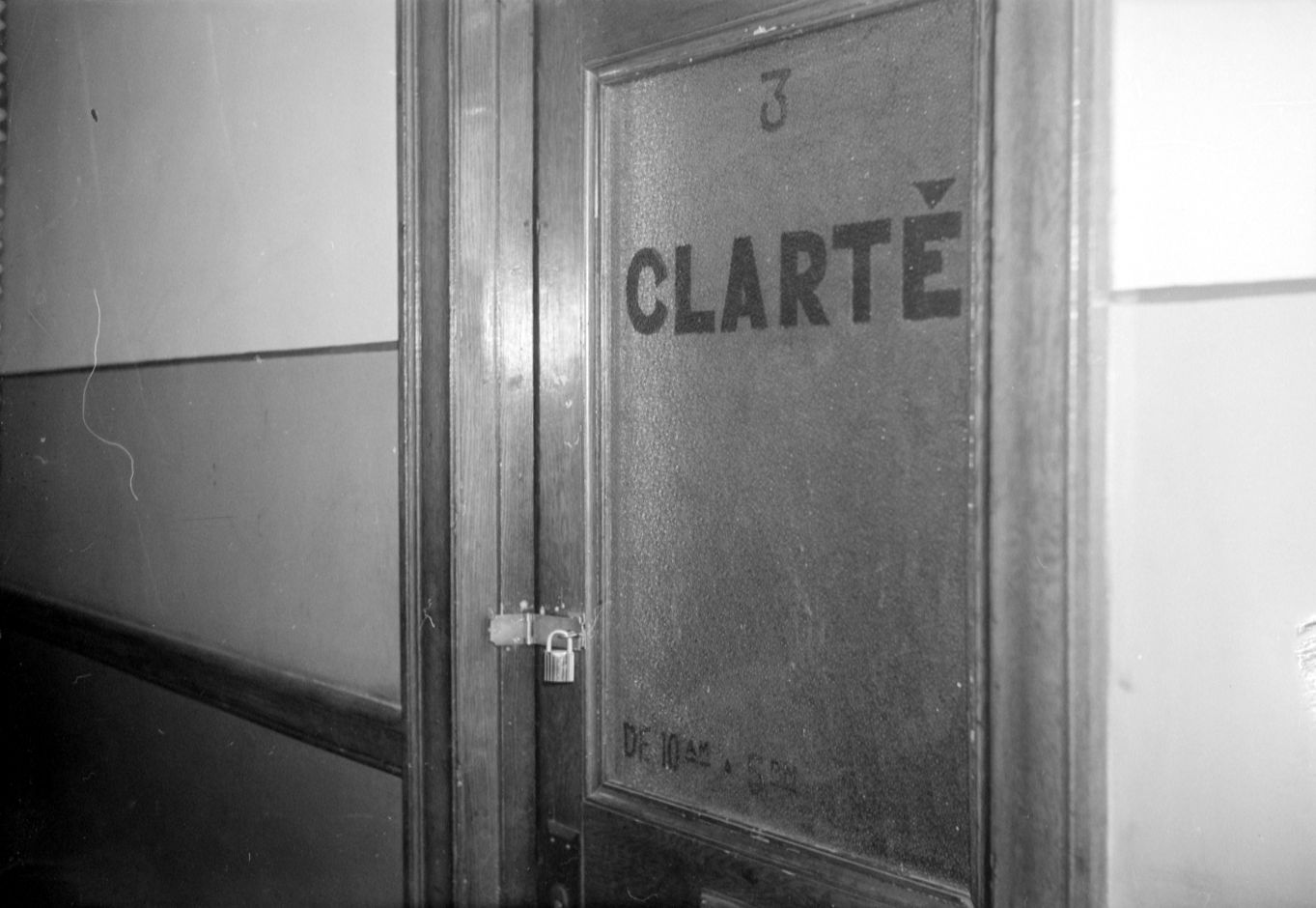
The doorway of the newspaper La Clarte, a weekly communist newspaper, padlocked by the police in Montreal, Quebec, Canada in 1937

Certain aspects of some communist ideologies, such as violent means for attaining its goals (revolution), abolition of private property and animosity towards organized religion were against the traditional values of the Western world and have met with strong opposition, including attempts to make the communist propaganda illegal in some states. For example:

- In 1937, the Canadian province of Quebec enacted the "Padlock Law", which enabled police to prevent the use of any premises for the promotion of communism or Bolshevism. The Supreme Court of Canada struck down the Padlock Law as unconstitutional in 1957.
- In 1962, the U.S. state of Louisiana passed a law identifying communist propaganda as a subversive activity and declared that "it shall be a felony for any person to knowingly, willfully and intentionally deliver, distribute, disseminate or store communist propaganda in the state of Louisiana except under the specific exemptions hereinafter provided."

== Specific examples ==
- Propaganda in the Soviet Union
- Propaganda in China
- Propaganda in the Polish People's Republic
- Propaganda in North Korea
- Propaganda in Cuba
- Agitprop
- Agitprop theatre
  - The Decision, Man Equals Man
- ABC of Communism, History of the Communist Party of the Soviet Union (Bolsheviks), Quotations from Chairman Mao
- Whataboutism
- Bolivarian propaganda

== See also ==
- Soviet historiography
- Capitalist propaganda

Censorship:

- Eastern Bloc information dissemination
- Censorship in the Soviet Union

== Sources ==
- John Connelly (2000) "Captive University: The Sovietization of East German, Czech, and Polish Higher Education, 1945–1956", ISBN 0-8078-4865-4.
