= Der Stellvertreter =

Der Stellvertreter may refer to:

- The Deputy or Der Stellvertreter, a 1963 play by Rolf Hochhuth
- Amen., a 2002 film based on that play, by its original German title
