= Beatification and canonization of Pope Paul VI =

2014 and 2018 events

Pope Saint Paul VI
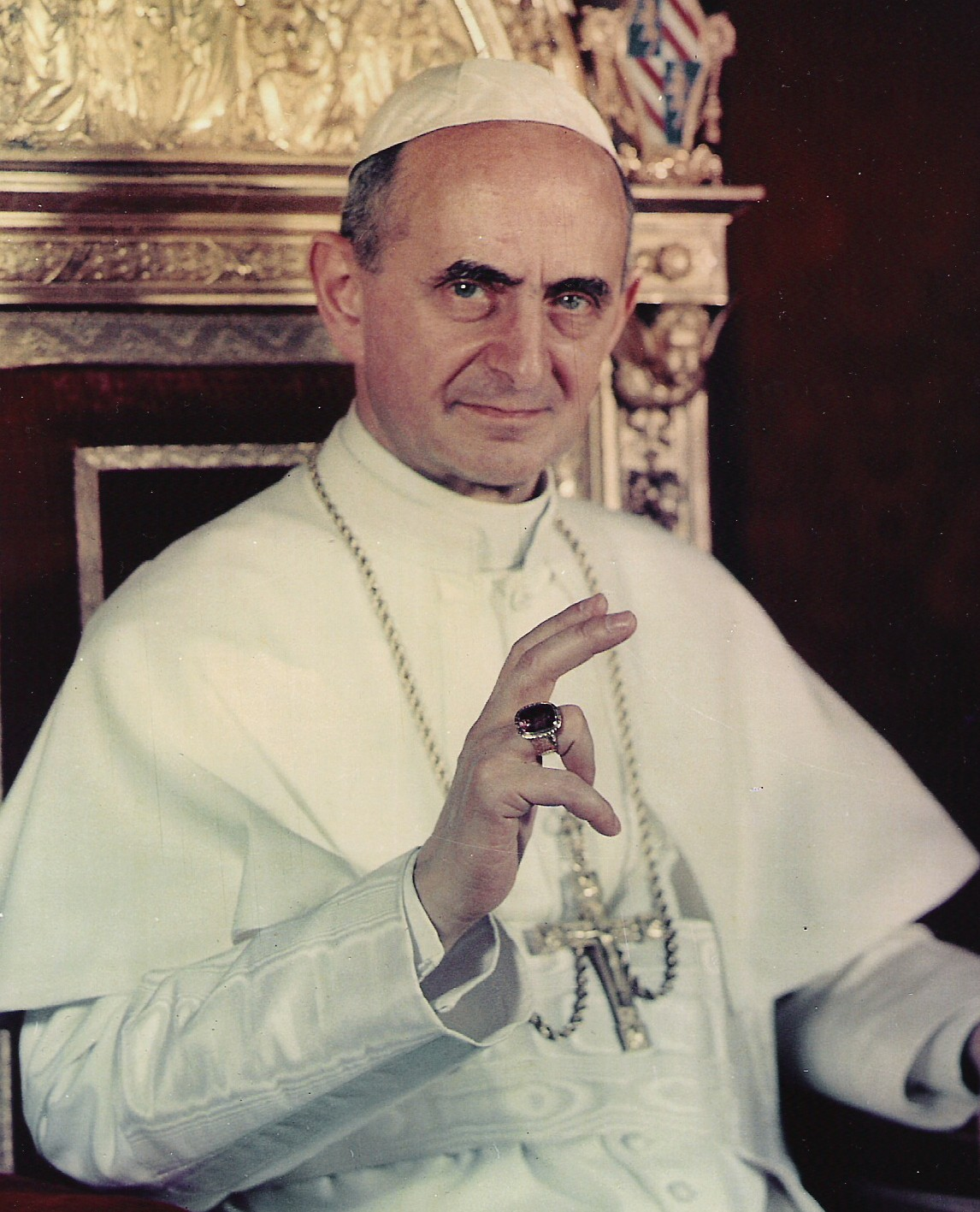
- Pope Paul VI c. 1963

Pope Confessor of the Faith
- Born: Giovanni Battista Enrico Maria Montini; 26 September 1897; Concesio, Brescia, Kingdom of Italy
- Died: 6 August 1978 (aged 80); Castel Gandolfo, Lazio, Italy
- Venerated in: Catholic Church
- Beatified: 19 October 2014, Saint Peter's Square, Vatican City by Pope Francis
- Canonized: 14 October 2018, St. Peter's Square by Pope Francis
- Feast: 26 September; 30 May (Ambrosian Rite); 29 May
- Attributes: Papal vestments; Papal tiara
- Patronage: Archdiocese of Milan; Paul VI Pontifical Institute; Paderno Dugnano; Magenta; Second Vatican Council; Diocese of Brescia; Ecumenism; Concesio
- In nomine Domini (In the name of the Lord)

The cause for the canonization of Pope Paul VI, who died in 1978, commenced in 1993 and he was canonized on 14 October 2018. After having been proclaimed a Servant of God and declared Venerable, he was beatified on 19 October 2014, after the recognition of a miracle had been attributed to his intercession, and declared a saint by Pope Francis on 14 October 2018.

The postulator for this cause was Antonio Marrazzo while the vice-postulator was Antonio Lanzoni.

== History ==
=== Diocesan process ===
On 18 March 1993 "nihil obstat" ("nothing against") was declared under Pope John Paul II which opened the cause for beatification. The diocesan process commenced on 11 May 1993 in Rome and thus, he was granted the title of Servant of God. The postulator assigned to the cause was Father Antonio Marrazzo. The diocesan process concluded its business on 18 March 1998. Father Luigi Villa, playing the part of the devil's advocate, released a book titled Paul VI: Beatified? which was written in opposition to the cause of beatification.

=== Roman phase ===
The Positio - documents and other information gathered from the diocesan process - was forwarded to the Congregation for the Causes of Saints in 2011. Theological consultors and the members of the congregation collaborated on the resources gathered from the previous process and unanimously agreed that the late pope had lived a life of heroic virtue. They forwarded their vote to Pope Benedict XVI who, on 20 December 2012, signed the decree in recognition of his heroic virtues. This meant that he was titled Venerable.

=== The miracle and investigations ===
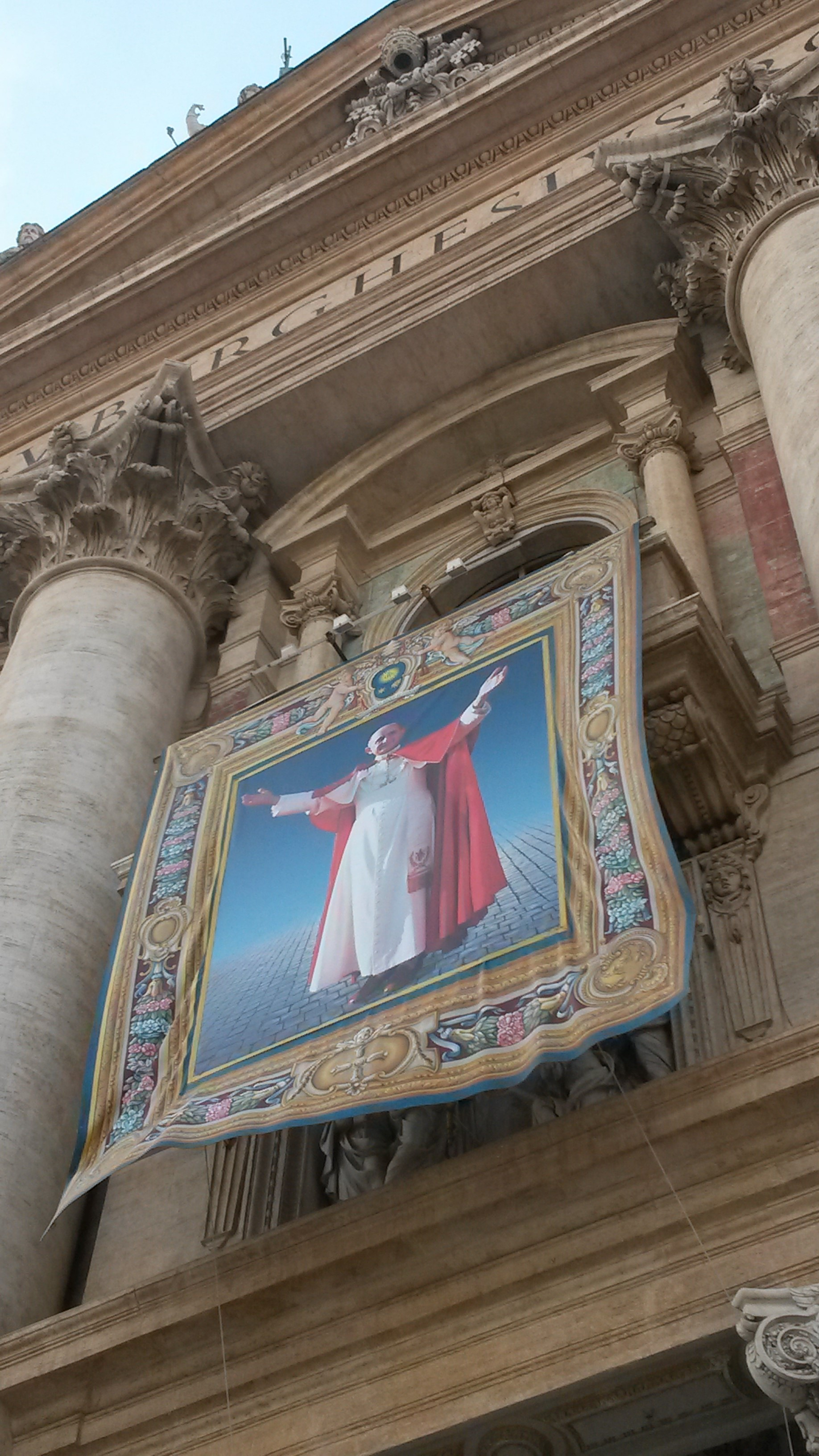
Beatification tapestry.

In 2003 an alleged miracle attributed to his intercession had been discovered in the United States of America. The case involved a fetus in the mother's womb which suffered brain defects that would affect the child. The doctor advised the mother to have an abortion but the mother refused to do so and requested the intercession of the late pope at the behest of a nun who gave her a card with a piece of the late pope's cassock on it. When the child was born, there were no defects that could be detected and the child's health was monitored until it became an adolescent. The child in question still shows no signs of defects.

The inquiry into the miracle closed in 2006 and the case went to a Vatican medical board which met on 12 December 2013 and voted in favour of the miracle which they deemed was "medically unexplainable". Theological advisors met to discuss the miracle on 18 February 2014 and also voted in favour of the miracle which was then forwarded to the members of the Congregation for the Causes of Saints. The congregation met on 5 May 2014 and voted that the healing was indeed a miracle attributed to the late pope.

On 24 April 2014, it was reported in the Italian magazine Credere that the late pope could possibly be beatified on 19 October 2014. This report further stated that cardinals and bishops of the congregation would meet on 5 May to confirm the miracle that had previously been approved, and then present it to the pope who may sign the decree for beatification after that.

In an audience on 9 May 2014 with the Cardinal Prefect for the Congregation of the Causes of Saints, Pope Francis approved the decree of recognition of the miracle attributed to the late pope, and set the date of the beatification at the Vatican for 19 October 2014.

== Beatification ==
The beatification for Paul VI was held on 19 October 2014 at the Vatican, with the deceased pontiff receiving the title "Blessed". The next step would be the recognition of another miracle, which would result in his canonization.

There were several dignitaries present at the beatification ceremony as representatives of their countries.

Country	Title	Dignitary
Angola	Minister of Culture	Rosa Cruz e Silva
Angola	Foreign Minister	Georges Chikoti
Taiwan	Foreign Minister	David Lin
Zimbabwe	President	Robert Mugabe
Zimbabwe	First Lady	Grace Mugabe

The relics presented during the beatification rites are two blood-stained vests worn by Paul VI during the attempt on his life in the capital of the Philippines, Manila in 1970. The one habitually kept in his hometown will be brought to Rome in a reliquary for the beatification.

His tomb underneath Saint Peter's Basilica was modified the week of the beatification with the inscription "BEATVS" ("Blessed") added before his name.

== Canonization ==
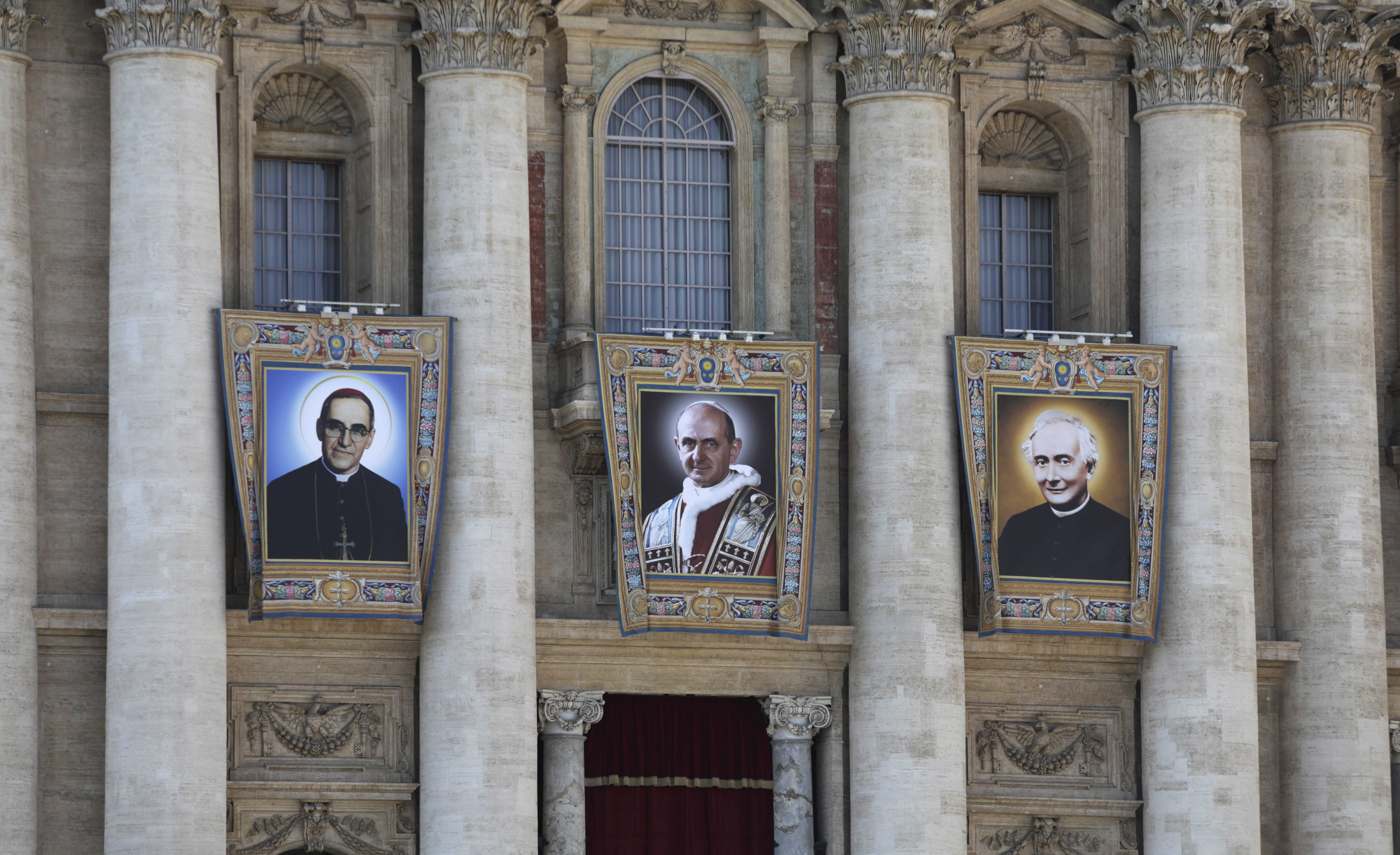
Canonization of Pope Paul VI, among others.

It had been speculated in 2014 that Pope Francis might have canonized Paul VI, as early as June 2015, with the process of "equipollent canonization" which he had used in the past. If this was not used, then a miracle would have been required for the canonization.

The second miracle required for his canonization was reported to have occurred in January 2015. An investigation into the reported miracle was subsequently undertaken in northern Italy, where the healing was said to have occurred. Back in January 2015, Antonio Lanzoni thought the canonization might occur in the first half of 2016, but it did not.

Theologians advising the Congregation for the Causes of Saints voiced their approval to this miracle on 13 December 2017 and have this direction on to the cardinal and bishop members of the C.C.S. who must vote on the cause also before taking it to Pope Francis for his approval. Brescian media reported the canonization could take place in October 2018 to coincide with the synod on the youth. The cardinal and bishop members of the C.C.S. issued their unanimous approval to this miracle in their meeting held on 6 February 2018; La Stampa reported that the canonization could be celebrated during the synod on the youth with a probable date of 21 October. Pope Francis formally approved a second miracle needed for canonization in a meeting with Roman priests on 14 February 2018 and stated that Paul VI's canonization would take place sometime in 2018. The official confirmation came when Pope Francis signed a decree approving the miracle on 6 March 2018; the formal announcement of this confirmation was made in a Holy See press bulletin at noon on 7 March 2018.

Paul VI was canonized as a saint on 14 October 2018.

== See also ==
- Beatification of Pope John Paul II
- Canonization of Pope John XXIII and Pope John Paul II
- Canonization of Pope Pius XII
