= Seat 12 =

Alleged Soviet disinformation campaign against the Vatican

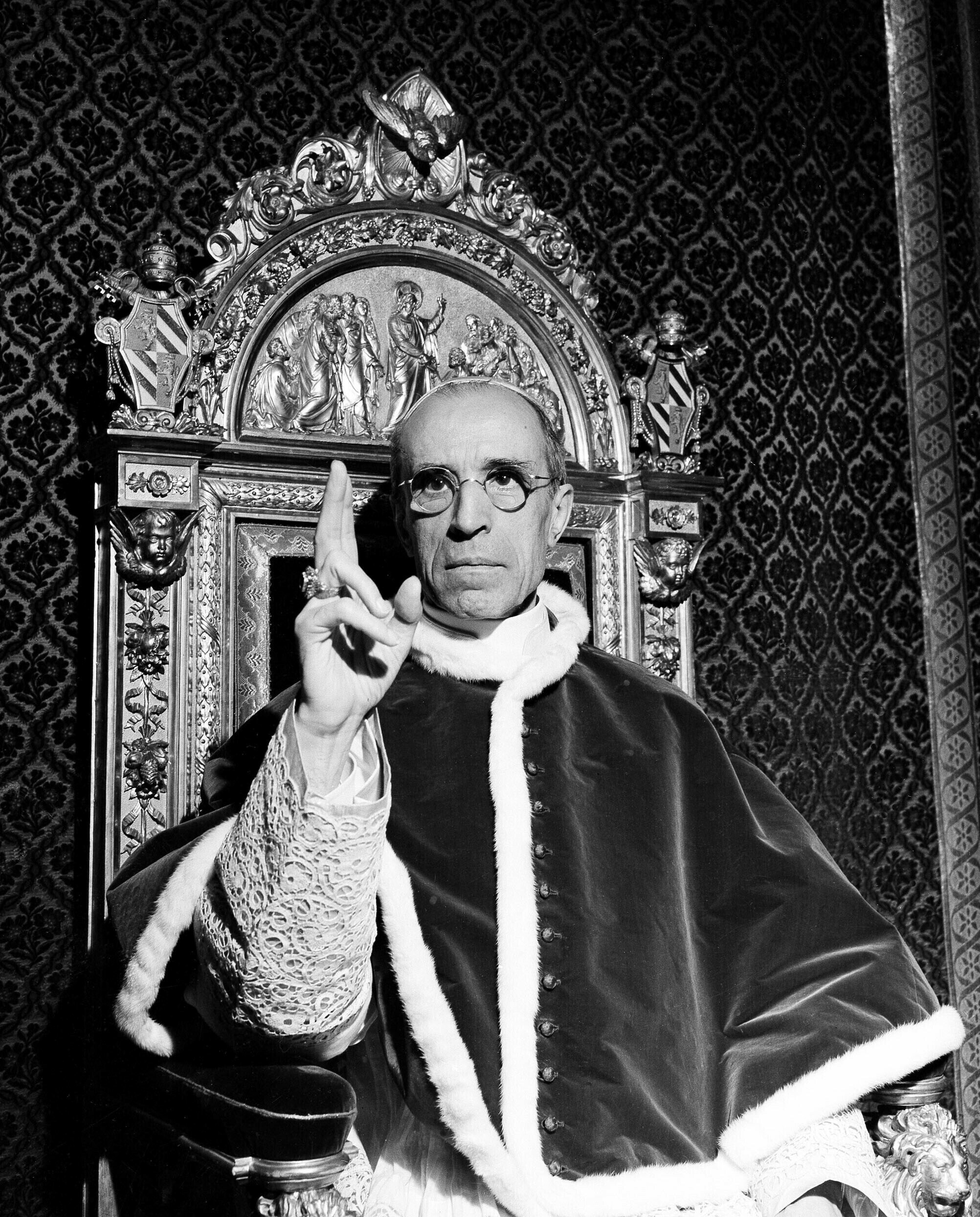
Pope Pius XII (1945)

Seat 12, also known as Operation Seat 12, was a purported disinformation campaign conducted by the Soviet Union during the Cold War to discredit the moral authority of the Vatican because of its outspoken anti-communism. Claims of the operation's existence were first made in 2007 by Ion Mihai Pacepa, a lieutenant general who headed the Securitate, Romanian secret service before defecting to the West in 1978.

== Description ==
According to Pacepa, in February 1960, Nikita Khrushchev authorized a covert operation to discredit the Vatican's moral authority in Western Europe with a campaign of disinformation due to its fervent anti-communism, Pope Pius XII being the prime target. The motto of Seat 12 was "Dead men cannot defend themselves", since Pius died in 1958. Pacepa states that General Ivan Agayants, chief of the KGB's disinformation department, created the outline for what was to become a play mischaracterizing the Pope as a Nazi sympathizer, The Deputy; that the purported research for the play consisted of forgeries; that the research was done not by its author Rolf Hochhuth, but by KGB agents; and that the play's producer, Erwin Piscator, founder of the Proletarian Theater in Berlin, was a devout Communist who had long established ties with the USSR.

Pacepa states that the KGB employed Romanian spies to feign that Romania was preparing to reestablish diplomatic relations with the Holy See. Under this ruse, Pacepa states he obtained entry into Vatican archives from the Church's head of secret discussions with the Warsaw Pact, Monsignor Agostino Casaroli. Three communist spies in the guise of priests over two years secreted materials out of the archives for copying and transfer to the KGB. "In fact," Pacepa reported, "no incriminating material against the pontiff ever turned up." According to Pacepa, General Ivan Agayants, head of Soviet disinformation, informed him while in Bucharest in 1963 that the disinformation campaign had "materialised into a powerful play attacking Pope Pius XII", Agayants having authored the outline of The Deputy and overseen KGB's compilation of the "research" which incorporated documents Pacepa's agents had purloined from the Vatican.

Writer and law professor Ronald Rychlak states that the American producer of Seat 12's play was also a communist; many of the press who lauded the play had deep connections to leftist or communist causes; a highly communist influenced periodical helped to guarantee The Deputy played on Broadway; and even early reviews had communist links. Pacepa also relates that in 1974 Yuri Andropov admitted that had Soviets known in 1963 what they knew in 1974 (newly released information that Hitler was hostile to and plotted against Pius XII) they would never have gone after him.

According to Rychlak, a declassified British intelligence memorandum, dated January 10, 1969, surmises that Hochhuth may have played a knowing role in spreading communist propaganda, rather than having been a dupe, saying he "might perhaps be an ‘intellectual agent', writing either on behalf of the East Germans or the Soviets" and the British agents declined to "discount the possibility of long-term efforts by the communists to foster Hochhuth's allegations until they become legend." The memorandum continued: "whether Hochhuth is motivated only by the urge to write historical plays, to rehabilitate the Germans or is up to some more sinister game is difficult to determine at this stage. But the Russians are certainly reaping some of the benefit."

Rychlak concludes that Hochhuth might not have been a knowing actor in the propaganda but was a "perfect candidate to be an unknowing dupe." Rychlak writes "his ideology was not far removed from Marxism. He also admitted that he was, at least at times, anticlerical. He was particularly opposed to priestly celibacy."

Referring to Pacepa's account, German historian Michael F. Feldkamp writes that "Pacepa's report is wholly credible. It fits like a missing piece in the puzzle of communist propaganda and disinformation aimed at discrediting the Catholic Church and its Pontiff." English historian, Michael Burleigh, concurring with Feldkamp, states: "Soviet attempts to smear Pius had actually commenced as soon as the Red Army crossed into Catholic Poland", noting that the Soviets "hired a militantly anti-religious propagandist, Mikhail Markovich Sheinmann" – "Hochhuth's play ... drew heavily upon Sheinmann's lies and falsehoods."

Pacepa's story has not been corroborated; the national German paper Frankfurter Allgemeine stated in 2007 that "Hochhuth did not require any KGB assistance for his one-sided presentation of history".

== See also ==
- Anti-Catholicism in the Soviet Union
- Persecution of Christians in the Soviet Union
- Persecution of Christians in Warsaw Pact countries
- Persecutions of the Catholic Church and Pius XII
- Pope Pius XII and Russia
