= The Deputy =

1963 play written by Rolf Hochhuth

Der Stellvertreter The Representative (UK) The Deputy (US)
- Oberon books edition of The Representative
- Original language: German
- Written by: Rolf Hochhuth

The Deputy, a Christian tragedy (German: Der Stellvertreter. Ein christliches Trauerspiel), also published in English as The Representative, is a controversial 1963 play by Rolf Hochhuth which portrayed Pope Pius XII as having failed to take action or speak out against the Holocaust. It has been translated into more than twenty languages. The play's implicit censure of a venerable if controversial pope has led to numerous counterattacks, including the 2007 allegation that Hochhuth was the dupe of a KGB disinformation campaign, later confirmed by both the Venona Project and Mitrokhin Files in declassification of the Soviet disinformation campaign Operation Seat 12. The Encyclopædia Britannica assesses the play as "a drama that presented a critical, unhistorical picture of Pius XII" and Hochhuth's depiction of the pope having been indifferent to the Nazi genocide as "lacking credible substantiation." However, it has since been discovered that Pope Pius XII seems to have known about concentration camps, at least knowing of the first camp built, which was partly made for priests at the Dachau concentration camp.

The first English translation by Robert David MacDonald was published as The Representative, by Methuen in Britain in 1963. In America a second translation by Richard Winston and Clara Winston was published as The Deputy by Grove in New York, 1964. A letter from Albert Schweitzer to Hochhuth's German publisher serves as the foreword to the US edition. A film version titled Amen. was made by the Greek-born French filmmaker Costa-Gavras in 2002.

== Production history ==
The play was first performed at West Berlin's "Freie Volksbühne" (Free People's Theater) on February 20, 1963 under the direction of Erwin Piscator. Within the same year, the play was produced at additional theatres in Sweden, Switzerland, Great Britain, Denmark, Finland and France.

The play received its first English production in London by the Royal Shakespeare Company at the Aldwych Theatre in September 1963. It was directed by Clifford Williams with Alan Webb/Eric Porter as Pius XII, Alec McCowen as Father Fontana, and Ian Richardson.

A condensed version prepared by American poet Jerome Rothenberg opened on Broadway on February 26, 1964 at the Brooks Atkinson Theatre with Emlyn Williams as Pius XII and Jeremy Brett as Father Fontana (replaced on May 24 by David Carradine). The producer Herman Shumlin had offered to release any actors who were troubled by the controversy surrounding the play. However, all of the actors remained with the production. The play ran for 316 performances. Herman Shumlin received the 1964 Tony Award as the "Best Producer (Dramatic)" for his Broadway production of The Deputy.

Author Rolf Hochhuth had originally prohibited a production of his play in Eastern European theatres out of apprehension that Eastern European governments could exploit the play for a striking anti-Catholic interpretation. This possibility troubled Hochhuth to such an extent that he later wrote "In choosing a Jesuit for my tragic hero I strove to condemn the sin and not the sinner - that is, not the Church but its silence - and to exemplify, after a Kierkegaardian fashion, the enormous difficulty of living up to the Catholic creed and the immense nobility of spirit of those who are capable even of coming close. To read the play as anti-Catholic is not to read it at all." The play was first produced in Eastern Europe almost three years after its premiere at the National Theatre in Belgrade in Yugoslavia in January 1966 and at the National Theatre in Bratislava in Czechoslovakia on February 12, 1966. The first production in East Germany took place on February 20, 1966 at Greifswald Theatre.

The Deputy has been produced in more than 80 cities worldwide since. In the English-speaking world, the play has since been revived by the Citizens Theatre, Glasgow in 1986 and at the Finborough Theatre, London, in August 2006.

== Historical models ==
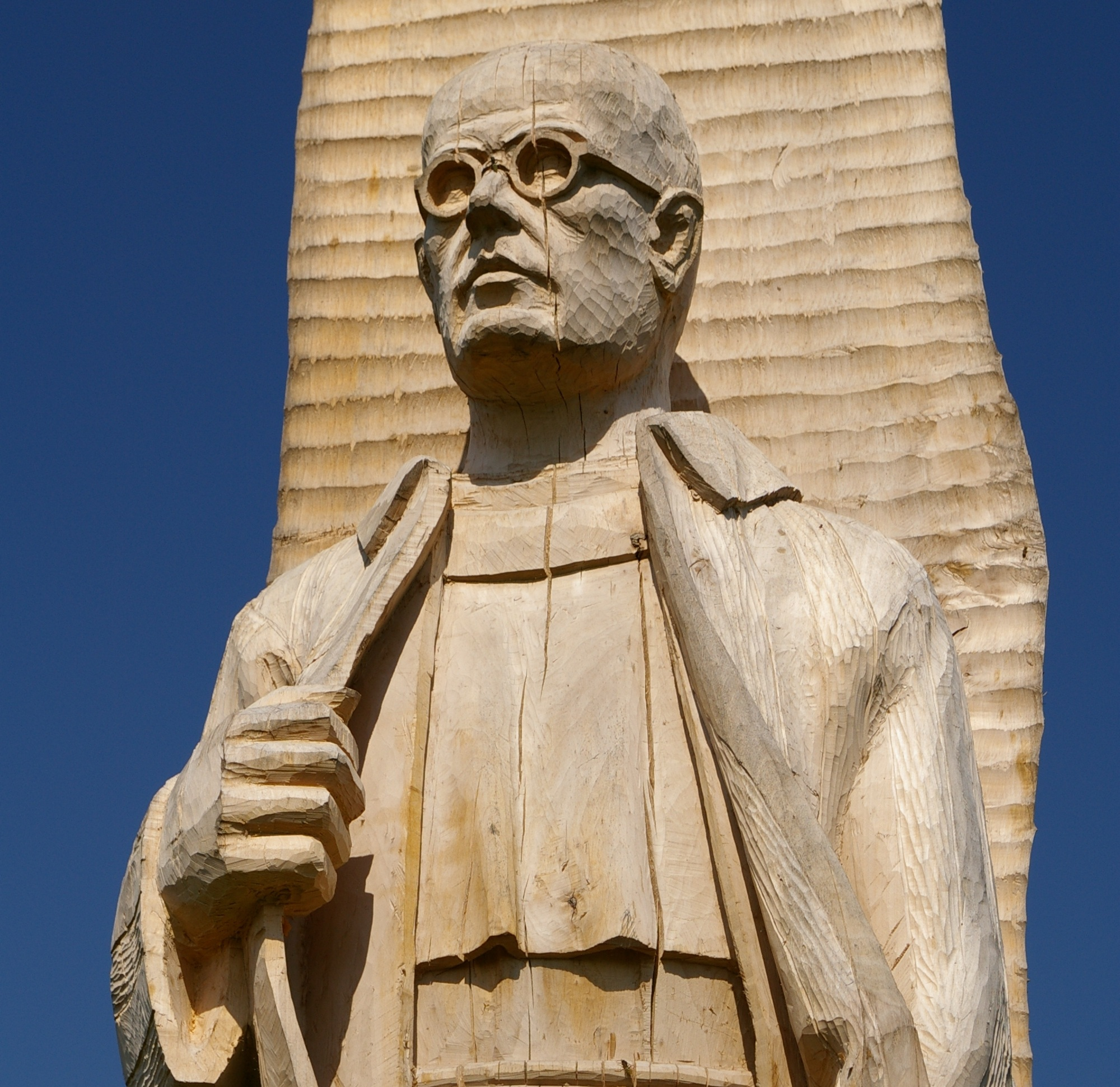
Maximilian Kolbe was imprisoned in 1941 and deported to Auschwitz where he entered the hunger block instead of a fellow prisoner (sculpture in Wiślica).

Rolf Hochhuth has referred to several historical models for the figures of his play. Among these persons are Pater Maximilian Kolbe (prisoner Nr. 16670 in Auschwitz) who sacrificed himself for the Catholic family man Franciszek Gajowniczek. Another model is the priest Bernhard Lichtenberg, provost of the cathedral of St. Hedwig in Berlin; he was imprisoned because he included Jews in his prayers and asked the Gestapo to share the fate of the Jews being sent to the east. Lichtenberg died on the transport to Dachau. A character in the play is Kurt Gerstein, an official at the "Institute of Hygiene" of the Waffen-SS, tried to inform the international public about the extermination camps. After the Second World War he produced the "Gerstein Report" that was used at the Nuremberg Trials.

In subtitling his play ein christliches trauerspiel, Hochhuth links his unusual, pseudo-journalistic approach (complete with stage directions well in excess even of Shaw's which tell us not only how a character looks and acts but what his or her life is like today - that is, in 1963, 21 years after the action of the play) to the tradition of Sophocles and Shakespeare. Hochhuth sought to refute two notions. It had been fashionable to claim (with Nietzsche) that "there can be no tragedy today" or, with Theodor W. Adorno, that "poetic art after Auschwitz is a barbarity", and Hochhuth does not believe modernity and tragedy incompatible. He also specifically noted it was a "Christian" tragedy in response to the view that tragedy was incompatible with Christianity, which was voiced by Tolstoy (in his conversations with Gorkiy) and elaborated 8 years before Hochhuth's play in a much-publicized article by Laurence Michel which claimed that "Christian tragedy" was a contradiction in terms and again a book by Walter Kaufmann (philosopher) from the following year. In linking "The Deputy" to both views, Hochhuth sought to overturn both presuppositions about what constituted a tragedy (after reading "The Deputy" and "Soldiers," and corresponding with Hochhuth, Kaufmann recanted his position.)

== Plot ==
=== Act I ===
The play opens with a discussion between Gerstein and the Papal Nuncio of Berlin over whether Pope Pius XII should have abrogated the Reichskonkordat to protest the actions of the Nazi government of Germany. Father Riccardo Fontana, the priest protagonist, and Gerstein meet for the first time.

A number of German aristocrats, industrialists, and government officials (including Adolf Eichmann) spend an evening in an underground bowling alley. Despite the commonplace setting the scene is rather macabre: conversations alternate between lighthearted pleasantries and equally dismissive discussions of the treatment of Jews. An icy Catholic industrialist—played by the same actor as Pius—defends his use of slave labor.

The final scene ends with Riccardo meeting Gerstein at his apartment; at the latter's urging, he agrees to trade clothes and documents with a Jew, Jacobson, Gerstein has been hiding in order to help him escape.

=== Act II ===
Act II repeatedly attempts to drive home the point that Hitler feared Pius more than any of his contemporaries and that Pius's commercial interests preclude him from condemning Hitler.

One of the Cardinals argues that the Nazis are the last bulwark that remains against Soviet domination of Europe.

=== Act III ===
As the Jews are rounded up for deportations "under the Pope's windows," Riccardo declares "doing nothing is as bad as taking part [...] God can forgive a hangman for such work, but not a priest, not the Pope!" and a German officer comments that the Pope has given "friendly audiences to thousands of members of the German army". Riccardo first voices his idea to follow the example of Bernhard Lichtenberg and to follow the Jews to the death camps in the East, and possibly to share in their fate.

=== Act IV ===
Pius, with a "cold, smiling face," "aristocratic coldness," and an "icy glint" in his eyes voices his concerns about the Vatican's financial assets and the Allied bombing of factories in Italy. Pius verbally reiterates his commitment to help the Jews but states that he must keep silent "'ad maioram mala vitanda" (to avoid greater evil). When angrily questioned by Riccardo, Pius pontificates on the geopolitical importance of a strong Germany vis-a-vis the Soviet threat. Ultimately, Riccardo shames the Pope into dictating a statement for public release; however, its wording is so vague that all are confident it will be ignored by the Germans. Riccardo views this as akin to the Crusades, a sin that forever stains Mother Church, and feels called on to prove to God that the Church is indeed worthy of his trust: " 'If God once promised Abraham that he would not destroy Sodom if only ten just men dwelt in it...maybe...God will still forgive the Church if even only a few of its servants - like Lichtenberg - stand with the persecuted...The Pope's silence burdens the Church with a guilt for which we have to atone...Not Auschwitz is at stake now! The idea of the papacy must be preserved pure in eternity, even if it is briefly embodied by an Alexander VI, or a -'" Riccardo breaks off, but clearly he, and possibly Hochhuth, want to imply a comparison between the Borgia Pope (Alexander VI) and Pius XII.

=== Act V ===
Riccardo dons the yellow star and joins deportees to die at Auschwitz, where the rest of the act takes place. He is confronted by the Doctor, who is otherwise not named but closely resembles Josef Mengele. The Doctor is a nihilist to whom "Auschwitz refutes creator, creation and the creature. . . cursed is he who creates life. I cremate life." He takes Riccardo under his protection, hoping that the church will help him escape the hangman after Germany loses the war. Gerstein appears at the camp in an unsanctioned attempt to rescue Riccardo. Unfortunately in the end they are found out, and Riccardo momentarily loses in faith and violates his vow not to take up arms in order to shoot the maleficent Doctor, but is himself gunned down before he can pull the trigger. Gerstein is taken into custody, and Riccardo follows in a long tradition of tragic figures by showing himself partly redeemed with his dying declaration, a whispered "'in hora mortis meae voca me'" (Latin, and modally ambiguous: one could read subjunctive :"in the hour of my death may He call unto me" or imperative "in the hour of my death, call unto me!" In either case, Riccardo does not die entirely confident of salvation, which would lessen his status as a tragic hero.

The play ends with a quotation from German ambassador Weizsäcker:

Since further action on the Jewish problem is probably not to be expected here in Rome, it may be assumed that this question, so troublesome to German-Vatican relations, has been disposed of.

== Reception ==
The premiere of Rolf Hochhuth's "Christian tragedy" in West Berlin's "Theater am Kurfürstendamm" (temporary home of the "Freie Volksbühne Berlin") on February 20, 1963 caused the largest and most heated theatre controversy in postwar Germany. The theatre production led to international diplomatic complications. Further productions of Hochhuth's play brought about conflicts and turmoil in several European cities. Hannah Arendt also discusses the play (and public reaction to it) in her 1964 essay "The Deputy: Guilt by Silence?".

In the assessment of the Encyclopædia Britannica, the depiction of the Pope as indifferent to the Holocaust "lacks credible substantiation". The encyclopedia notes "though Pius's wartime public condemnations of racism and genocide were cloaked in generalities, he did not turn a blind eye to the suffering but chose to use diplomacy to aid the persecuted. It is impossible to know if a more forthright condemnation of the Holocaust would have proved more effective in saving lives, though it probably would have better assured his reputation."

Michael Phayer notes that during the Second Vatican Council of the Catholic Church a direct reference was made by Bishop Josef Stangl to Hochhuth's play when he declared to the council: "If we speak in the name of God, in the name of Jesus Christ, as the deputies of the Lord, then our message must be [a clear] 'Yes, Yes! [or] 'No, no' - the truth, not tactics". His "moving address" made a significant contribution "to reversing the church's anti-semitism" (see Nostra aetate).

It has been said that it was Bishop Alois Hudal who provided Rolf Hochhuth with the image of the "heartless, money-grasping pontiff". Hudal has been described as "the most notorious pro-Nazi bishop in the entire Catholic Church". He was appointed to a Pontifical commission where he assisted Nazi war criminals like Adolf Eichmann, Josef Mengele, Franz Stangl, Eduard Roschmann, and many others to escape justice. After he became "a little too public" with these activities he was sidelined by Pope Pius and, according to Hansjakob Stelhe, "took his revenge" by providing Hochhuth with his portrait of Pius.

== Film adaptation ==
Rowohlt Verlag sold the worldwide rights for a film adaptation for 300,000 Deutsche Mark in April 1963 to the French producer Georges de Beauregard and his production company "Rome Paris Films". The Deputy was eventually made as the film Amen. by the Greek-born French filmmaker Costa-Gavras in 2002.

== Alleged KGB disinformation ==
In 2007 a high ranking intelligence officer and defector from the Eastern Bloc, Ion Mihai Pacepa, stated that in February 1960, Nikita Khrushchev authorized a covert plan (known as Seat 12) to discredit the Vatican, with Pope Pius XII as the prime target. As part of that plan Pacepa alleged that General Ivan Agayants, chief of the KGB's disinformation department, created the outline for what was to become the play. Pacepa's story has not been corroborated; the national paper Frankfurter Allgemeine opined that Hochhuth who had been an unknown publisher's employee until 1963 "did not require any KGB assistance for his one-sided presentation of history". However, German historian Michael F. Feldkamp called Pacepa's account "wholly credible. It fits like a missing piece in the puzzle of communist propaganda and disinformation aimed at discrediting the Catholic Church and its Pontiff." English historian, Michael Burleigh, stated "Soviet attempts to smear Pius had actually commenced as soon as the Red Army crossed into Catholic Poland", noting that the Soviets "hired a militantly anti-religious propagandist, Mikhail Markovich Sheinmann" - "Hochhuth's play...drew heavily upon Sheinmann's lies and falsehoods..."

== Literature ==
- Hannah Arendt: Responsibility and Judgment. New York: Schocken 2003. ISBN 0-8052-1162-4 (contains Arendt's 1964 essays The Deputy: Guilt by Silence? and Personal Responsibility Under Dictatorship)
- Emanuela Barasch-Rubinstein: The devil, the saints, and the church: reading Hochhuth's The Deputy. New York: Peter Lang 2004.
- Eric Bentley: The storm over The Deputy. New York: Grove Press 1964.
- Lucinda Jane Rennison: Rolf Hochhuth's interpretation of history, and its effect on the content, form and reception of his dramatic work. Durham: University of Durham 1991.
- Margaret E. Ward: Rolf Hochhuth. Boston: Twayne Publishers 1977.
