= Novimus Nos =

Novimus Nos Apostolic letter of Pope Pius XII
- Signature date: January 20, 1956

Novimus Nos (January 20, 1956) is an Apostolic Letter of Pope Pius XII to the Catholic Bishops of the Eastern Catholic Rites, whose dioceses are devastated after years of persecution. The letter commemorates the 1000th anniversary of the conversion of Saint Olga, which was the beginning of Christianity in Russia.

When the letter was written the Vatican was not aware that several of the addressees had already been deported to Siberia; five Catholic bishops were killed. The Pope describes the life of Saint Olga, who led her people out of the barbarianism of her time. She faced and overcame endless problems. Her nephew Saint Vladimir continued in her spirit, and, as described in the encyclical Orientales omnes Ecclesias, he maintained unity and cordial relations with the Holy See.

Pope Pius XII congratulates the Russian people to this great historic figure Olga on her 1000th anniversary, quoting the ancient Roman philosopher Marcus Tullius Cicero: Our fatherland is more precious than we are. The Pope continues, but the heavenly fatherland is even more precious, since it lasts for all eternity. Although the situation at the time was unpromising, the Pope encourages not to lose faith, courage or unity. The quiet voices of all those, who are mistreated and in chains, powerfully testify Christ Crucified. God permits ridicule, and at times waits with His reply to test and purify His faithful. But because He is just, He will surely accept the prayers of those who are persecuted because of Him. Pope Pius asks his bishops, to fully trust in the Lord, and to turn with instant prayers to the saints of the Russian people. Persecutions will thus end and the Russian people will experience better times. In this hope, the pope concludes with his Apostolic Blessings.
