= Emanuela Barasch Rubinstein =

Israeli author and scholar

Emanuela Barasch Rubinstein (Hebrew: עמנואלה ברש רובינשטיין) is an Israeli author and a Humanities scholar.

== Biography ==
Emanuela Barasch Rubinstein was born in Jerusalem to the art historian Moshe Barasch. She has a Bachelor degree in Philosophy and Comparative Literature, a master's degree in Comparative Religion and a PhD from the Hebrew University in Jerusalem. Her doctoral thesis focuses on the literary and religious interpretations of the Holocaust. She taught at Tel Aviv University, she is now teaching at the Inter-Disciplinary Center, Herzliya. Rubinstein published three academic books on the cultural interpretation of Nazism and the Holocaust. Two were published in English (Mephisto in the Third Reich, De Gruyter Press, The Devil, the Saints and the Church, Peter Lang) and one in Hebrew (Nazi Devil, The Hebrew University Magnes Press). She has also translated two books from English into Hebrew.

After publishing these books, Rubinstein turned to write fiction. Five Selves (Holland House Books), a collection of five novellas which she wrote in Hebrew and translated into English, was published in the United Kingdom. Her novel Delivery (in Hebrew) was published by Hakibbutz Hameuchad in 2018. The English edition was published in 2021. She published short stories in literary journals in the United States and in Israel. She runs a blog entitled On Ourselves and Others dealing with various cultural topics.

== Works ==
=== Academic Books ===
- The Devil, the Saints, and the Church, Peter Lang, 2003.
- The Nazi Devil (in Hebrew), The Hebrew University Magnes Press, 2010.
- Mephisto in the Third Reich, De Gruyter, 2014.

=== Fiction ===
- Five Selves, Holland House Books, 2015.
- Delivery (in Hebrew), Hakibutz Hameuchad, 2018.
- Delivery (in English), Holland House Books, 2021.
- Intimate Solitude, Academic Studies Press, 2024.

=== Translations ===
- Evans-Pritchard, Theories of Primitive Religion, Bialik Institute, 1998.
- Grossman, Rodgers, Moore, Unlocking Creativity in the Workplace, Branko Weiss Institute, 1995.
