= Sacro vergente anno =

Sacro vergente anno Apostolic letter of Pope Pius XII
- Signature date: July 7, 1952
- Text: In Latin

Sacro vergente anno, (also called Carissimis Russiae populis), is a 7 July 1952 Apostolic Letter of Pope Pius XII to all people of Russia, issued on the feast of saints Cyril and Methodius, "Apostles to the Slavs". In it the Pope consecrates all the people of Russia to the Immaculate Heart of Mary.

== Content ==
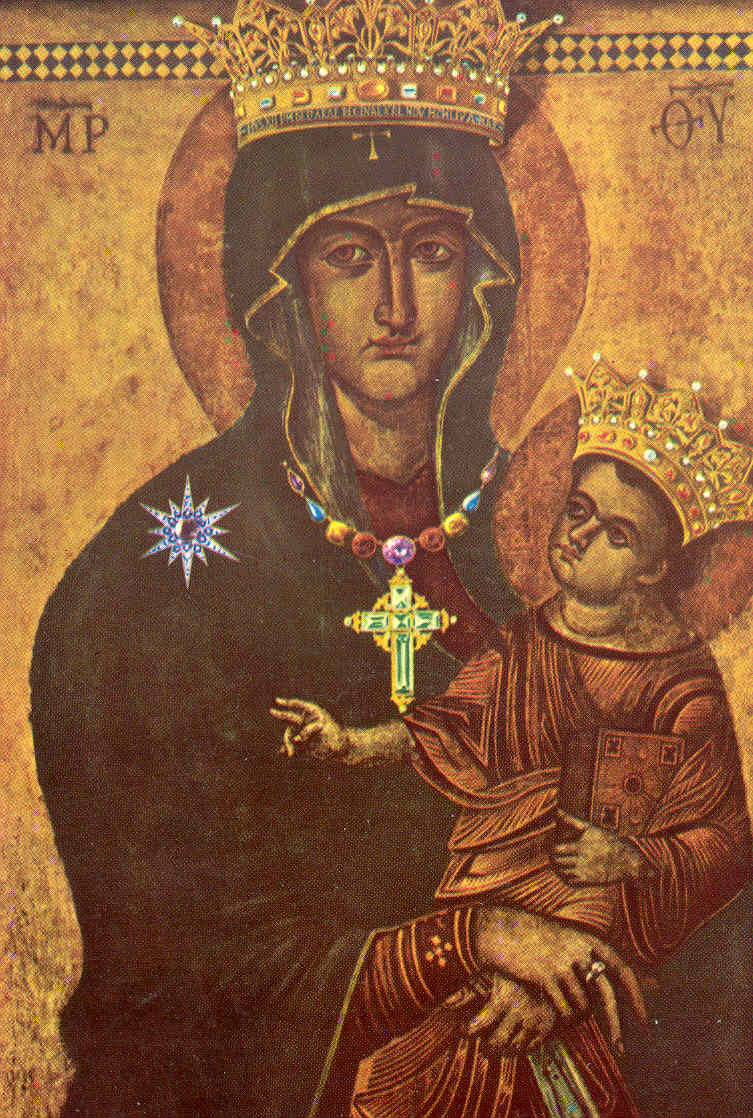
A rare picture of Salus Populi Romani crowned for the Marian year 1954 by Pope Pius XII

The Pope remembered that after he solemnly declared the Virgin Mary taken up into heaven, many wrote to him, asking that he may dedicate the whole Russian people to the Immaculate Heart of the Virgin. He was grateful for this request, since he had a special affection for the great people, who, while separated from him, continued to fight for its Christian identity with all means and great courage.

The Pope reviews 1000 years of relations and difficulties and describes the humanitarian efforts of his predecessors, Pope Benedict XV and Pope Pius XI for the needy and hungry populations of the Soviet Union. During the war, he himself would not utter one word, which could have been used unfairly, and despite strong pressures, he never approved a war against communism or Russia in 1941. However, he will not remain silent, when religion, truth or justice are at stake, since it is his deepest wish, that nations are ruled not by military might but justice. Everybody must fairly admit that he was impartial during the last war. Now, that the war is over, it is his duty to speak out and to condemn communism, but this does never mean, that the Church rejects those who err.

The Pope has great confidence in the people of Russia but is anguished about the Soviet hostility towards religion in general and the Catholic Church in particular. The Pope laid the groundwork for a collaboration between East and West Christianity against militant atheism.

In closing he consecrated the peoples of Russia to the Immaculate Heart of Mary: "...as a few years ago we consecrated the whole world to the Immaculate Heart of the Virgin Mother of God, so now, in a way very special, we consecrate all the peoples of Russia to the same Immaculate Heart,"

The Pope reminds the Russian people, that the Virgin Mary is always victorious. The gates of hell will never prevail, where she offers her protection. She is the good mother, the mother of all, and it has never been heard, that those who seek her protection, will not receive it. All error and atheism will be overcome with her assistance and divine grace.

== See also ==
- Consecration and entrustment to Mary
- Consecration of Russia
- Mariology of Pope Pius XII
