= Orientales Ecclesias =

1952 papal encyclical by Pius XII

Orientales ecclesias Encyclical of Pope Pius XII
- Signature date: 15 December 1952
- Number: 23 of the pontificate

Orientales ecclesias (December 15, 1952) is an encyclical of Pope Pius XII concerning the persecution of the Eastern Catholic Churches and describing the desperate situation of the faithful in Communist Bulgaria.

== Summary ==
Orientales ecclesias reviews the efforts of the Holy See in improving relations with the Eastern Catholic Churches. Pope Pius XII mentions the naming of another Eastern Cardinal, Grégoire-Pierre Agagianian, and the reform of the Eastern Canon Law as two examples. But the most flourishing Christian communities are wiped out without trace these days. He does not know details except that many bishops and priests are deported to unknown destinations, to concentration camps and to jails, while some are under house arrest. In Bulgaria, Bishop Bossilkoff was executed with many others. The Pontiff writes this encyclical letter specifically after the arrest, brutal treatment and martyrdom of Bishop Eugene Bossilkov, ordinary of the diocese of Nicopoli. The execution took place in Bulgaria, October 5, 1952.

But Bulgaria is not alone. Many are robbed of the most basic natural and human rights, and mistreated in the most extreme ways. The suffering in Ukraine is immense. The Pope refers specifically to the Kiev show trial against bishops of the Eastern Churches. Still there is reason for comfort and hope: The strength of the faithful. The Christian faith makes better citizens, who use their God-given freedom to work for their societies to further the causes of justice and unity.

The encyclical letter is a sign of solidarity with all clergy and faithful of the Eastern Catholic Churches, who suffer for their faith in the East. The Pope is especially proud of all those who maintain their faith and link to the Catholic Church in such difficult times and commends all those, who to continue to persevere in their faith and oppose with the same firmness as so many brave generations before them. The Pope concludes by requesting world-wide public prayers for the persecuted and, embracing all, offers his Apostolic Blessing.

== Sources ==
- Orientales ecclesias, Acta Apostolicae Sedis, (AAS) Roma, Vaticano, 1953, 5 (original Latin text)
- English translation
