= Canonization of Pope Pius XII =

The canonization process of Pope Pius XII dates to shortly after his death in 1958. He was declared a servant of God in 1990 and venerable in 2009. Father Peter Gumpel was the relator (collector of information) of Pius XII's cause for canonization. The potential beatification of Pius XII has raised concern, especially by Jewish organisations, because of his controversial record during the Holocaust. The objections especially arise because of the refusal by the Vatican to allow independent access to the Vatican's archives for the period of Pius XII's papacy. The Vatican archives related to the Pontificate of Pope Pius XII were opened to researchers on March 2, 2020.

== Process ==
Archbishop van Lierde, archpriest of St Peter's Basilica and a close personal friend of Pope Pius XII, authorized and gave his imprimatur to relic prayer cards in many languages dated December 8, 1958, two months less a day after the death of now venerable Pope Pius XII. Most importantly, this authorized prayer released by the Vatican less than two months after Pope Pius XII's death explicitly asks God to hasten Pius being elevated to be a saint. Officially mandated prayers for the canonization were thus current with official sanction weeks after the pope's death. Claims that Monsignor Montini initiated the cause of canonization in the 1960s are not therefore supported by the facts clearly available.

=== Servant of God ===
Pope John Paul II declared Pius XII a servant of God in 1990.

=== Venerable ===
Pope Benedict XVI initially decided to postpone Pius XII's cause for sainthood upon his election in 2005. Benedict had advocated waiting until the archives from Pius XII's papacy were opened to researchers in 2014. A selection, the ADSS, edited by a multinational team of Jesuits, was published between 1965 and 1981.

Benedict changed his mind and declared Pius XII venerable on December 19, 2009, based on the recommendation of the committee. Pope John Paul II, Benedict XVI's predecessor, was declared venerable on the same day. The Congregation for the Causes of Saints certifies the "heroic virtues" of a candidate for venerable status, although the final decision lies with the pope. Benedict XVI was 12 years old when Pius XII was elected to the papacy in 1939; one Vatican insider described Benedict XVI's memory of Pius XII thus: "Pius is really 'his' Pope."

BusinessWeek compared the move to Barack Obama's receipt of the 2009 Nobel Peace Prize, noting:

So what was the rush? The answer is politics – which does not make for an edifying religious spectacle. The common perception, disputed by the Vatican, is that by pairing Pius XII with John Paul II in the Dec 20 decree, Benedict had hoped to satisfy both the conservative and the liberal wings of the Catholic Church. Let's just leave aside the fact that there isn't much of a public constituency clamoring for a Saint Pius XII (Pius IX is beatified and Pius I, V and X are already saints), as there is for a Saint John Paul II, a charismatic pope who, many scholars say, played a key role in the collapse of Communism.

=== Future ===
Once the Vatican recognizes one scientifically inexplicable miracle based on Pius XII's intercession, the next step would be beatification; a second miracle would result in canonization (sainthood).

Father Peter Gumpel, the relator of the Pius XII's cause for canonization, claims that there are already several miracles attributable to Pius XII, including "one quite extraordinary one."

On August 1, 2013, an anonymous "source who works for the Congregation for the Causes of Saints" said Pope Francis was considering canonization without a miracle, "us[ing] the formula of scientia certa".

== Support ==
Vatican spokesman Father Federico Lombardi said: "With this decree the Pope says that Pius XII is a person that we have to admire, recognize as a model of Christian virtues, and it is very, very important that the church give officially this appreciation of this important pope that we know was guiding the church in very difficult times."

After some criticism regarding naming the Pope venerable, Father Lombardi clarified that acknowledging heroic virtue "takes account of the circumstances in which the person lived, and hence it is necessary to examine the question from a historical standpoint, but the evaluation essentially concerns the witness of Christian life that the person showed – his intense relationship with God and continuous search for evangelical perfection ... – and not the historical impact of all his operative decisions."

=== Jewish historians ===
Responding to the attacks on Pius, several Jewish historians voiced support of his virtue:

Sir Martin Gilbert told an interviewer that Pius deserves not blame but thanks. Michael Tagliacozzo, the leading authority on Roman Jews during the Holocaust, added, "I have a folder on my table in Israel entitled 'Calumnies Against Pius XII.' ... Without him, many of our own would not be alive." Richard Breitman (the only historian authorized to study U.S. espionage files from World War II) noted that secret documents prove the extent to which "Hitler distrusted the Holy See because it hid Jews."

Jewish leaders in Italy said they would reserve judgment until access to the Vatican's archives is made available, so a fair historical assessment of Pius could be made.

=== Other support ===
Cardinal George Pell of Australia stated: "I'm a great supporter of Pius XII. He was dealt an appallingly difficult set of cards. ... He did an enormous amount for the Jews."

== Opposition ==
=== Jewish groups ===
Pius XII's elevation to venerable status elicited "howls of protest from Jewish groups across Europe and the world" because of his controversial record during the Holocaust. The World Jewish Congress called the action "inopportune and premature". Rabbi Marvin Hier, founder and dean at the Simon Wiesenthal Center, said he was "amazed" and that "it has become our business, because in my opinion, there would be a great distortion of history" if Pius XII were canonized. According to CNN, "in Israel the news has been met with a mixture of disappointment, bewilderment and anger by Jewish leaders".

The American Gathering of Holocaust Survivors and Their Descendants called the announcement "profoundly insensitive and thoughtless" and added that "pairing the announcement on Pius – who remained publicly silent during the Holocaust – with that on John Paul II, himself a victim of the Nazis, is a particularly disturbing and callous act."

Stephan Kramer, secretary-general of the Central Council of Jews in Germany, called the declaration a "hijacking of historical facts concerning the Nazi era" and said that Benedict XVI "rewrites history without having allowed a serious scientific discussion. That's what makes me furious."

Rabbi Jeremy Lawrence, the head of Sydney's Great Synagogue, said: "How can one venerate a man who showed such cowardice, who was so close a bystander that he seemed to give his passive permission to the Nazis as the Jews were pried from his doorstep in Rome?".

Rabbi Yisrael Lau, the chairman of Yad Vashem, said: "I say with all the respect. Don't do it, especially not now when many survivors are still alive and it will hurt them deeply knowing that the man who could save, could do much more and did not do it. Don't make him holy. This is a shame I think for the church. It is not a good education for generations to come."

In 2023, Abe Foxman, former senior official in ADL, claimed that Kertzer's recent book proved that Pius XII did not act significantly to save Jews during the Second World War, and therefore did not deserve to be canonized.

At odds with those Jews who opposed the canonization of Pius XII, there is the case of Israel Zolli, Chief Rabbi of Rome from 1939 to 1945. Rabbi Zolli became a Catholic, taking the name of Eugenio in honor of Pius XII.

=== Historians ===
Australian historian Paul O'Shea said that the Vatican was in "such a rush" to make Pius XII a saint before the archives from his papacy were opened to historians. Robert Wistrich, the only Israeli on the International Catholic-Jewish Historical Commission, wrote in Haaretz:

So why has Benedict XVI chosen to take this step now? ... My own inclination is to think that the present pope regards Pius XII as a soulmate – both theologically and politically. He shares with the wartime pontiff an authoritarian centralist world-view and a deep distrust of liberalism, modernity, and the ravages of moral relativism. He was 31 years old when Pius XII died in 1958, and already then regarded him as a venerated role model. Moreover, the German-born Joseph Ratzinger (today Benedict XVI) certainly knew that Pius XII (an artistocratic Roman) was also a passionate Germanophile, surrounded by German aides during and after the war, fluent in the German language, and a great admirer of the German Catholic Church. Not only that, but Ratzinger probably knows that Pius XII personally intervened after 1945 to commute the sentences of convicted German war criminals. This solicitude for Nazi criminals contrasts sharply with Pius XII ignoring all entreaties to make a public statement against anti-Semitism even after the full horrors of the death camps had been revealed in 1945. In this context it is profoundly unsettling to think that the ultraconservative Benedict XVI and his entourage can identify so completely with Pius XII as a man of "heroic virtue".

Not all critics of Pius XII have opposed his canonization. Michael Phayer wrote in 2008: "Whether Pope Pius was a saint or should soon be declared a saint is not a question I take up in these pages. Those favoring his canonization need not feel compelled to step forward with the incense defense, nor should those who disfavor it feel exonerated. Historians must not be acolytes lighting the path for Pius XII's canonization, nor should they play devil's advocates to derail it."

== See also ==
- Hitler's Pope
