= Moral authority =

Authority premised on principles, or fundamental truths

Moral authority is authority premised on principles, or fundamental truths, which are independent of written, or positive laws. As such, moral authority necessitates the existence of and adherence to truth. Because truth does not change the principles of moral authority are immutable or unchangeable, although as applied to individual circumstances the dictates of moral authority for action may vary due to the exigencies of human life. These principles, which can be of metaphysical or religious nature, are considered normative for behavior, whether they are or are not also embodied in written laws, and even if the community is ignoring or violating them. Therefore, the authoritativeness or force of moral authority is applied to the conscience of each individual, who is free to act according to or against its dictates. Moral authority has thus also been defined as the "fundamental assumptions that guide our perceptions of the world".

An individual or a body of people who are seen as communicators of such principles but which does not have the physical power to enforce them on the unwilling are also spoken of as having or being a moral authority. An example is the Catholic Church.

In the latter sense, moral authority has also been defined as "the capacity to convince others how the world should be", as opposed to epistemic authority, "the capacity to convince others of how the world is".

The phrase has also been used in Australia to describe the situation when the head of a Royal commission expands the subjects being investigated, beyond the narrow focus of the commissions terms of reference.

== Changing focuses ==
Since the Age of Enlightenment, traditional sources of moral authority such as church or state have been viewed with increasing suspicion in Western culture: perhaps indeed all claims to moral authority. Instead of guides, entertainers; in place of ideals, stimulation.

Expertise, or alternatively what Emmanuel Levinas called the tyranny of opinion, or else an appeal to science, may be looked to for alternative sources of moral authority; or there may be a postmodern revulsion from all grand narratives which might ground such narratives in favour of moral relativism.

Talking of the poet, O'Donoghue argued in 2009 that Seamus Heaney still wielded some degree of moral authority, attributed in large part to his modernist reticence, lack of dogma, and capacity for self-doubt – as opposed for example to the unchallenged moral authority for centuries attributed to Virgil as a norma vivendi, i.e. a norm of living.

In reaction to the erosion of sources of moral authority, Late Modernity has also seen the appearance of various forms of fundamentalism, from a range of religious types to market fundamentalism.

== See also ==
- Antifoundationalism
- Auctoritas
- Charismatic authority
- Magisterium
- Moral character
