= Sempiternus Rex =

1951 papal encyclical by Pius XII

Sempiternus Rex Encyclical of Pope Pius XII
- Signature date: 8 September 1951
- Number: 21 of the pontificate
- Text: In English

Sempiternus Rex is an encyclical of Pope Pius XII dated in Rome at St. Peter on 8 September 1951, the feast of the Nativity of the Blessed Virgin Mary, on the 1500th anniversary of the Ecumenical Council of Chalcedon, which declared Christ to be both fully human and fully divine.

== Content ==
The encyclical centres on Christ fully human and fully divine, as defined by the council of Chalcedon in the year 451. Two points were important at that council of Chalcedon according to Pius XII: first, the principal role of the Roman Pontiff in such an essential theological debate; and second, the importance of the dogma itself. In light of the many persecutions and open hostility to everything Christian, Pope Pius appeals to all separated Christians to look again at Chalcedon and rethink their view of the Roman papacy. In light of the dogma of Christ fully divine and human, he refers to those, who have still problems with this article of faith.

The encyclical reviews the history of the council and the events leading to it, describing the illegal synod at Ephesus, the role of Flavian and the interventions of Pope Leo the Great. In Chalcedon, the priority of the Apostolic See was clarified, when it was pronounced "Peter spoke through the mouth of Leo". Pope Pius XII also credits the council with clear language using concepts without any double meaning.

The Pontiff uses the occasion of the anniversary to clarify the faith in light of some contemporary views of Christ, which in the Catholic view are heresies. Especially, tendencies to view Christ as mainly human or spiritual are wrong even if they claim to relate to Chalcedon. The Pope concludes his encyclical with an urgent call to the Eastern Christians not in communion with the Catholic Church to join the Catholic Church. The encyclical adds that the enemies of Christianity are so numerous, that only a common belief and joint effort seem to be promising.
