= Ivan Agayants =

KGB officer

Ivan Ivanovich Agayants
- Իվան Իվանի Ագայանց
- Born: August 28, 1911; Elizavetpol, Elizavetpol Governorate, Russian Empire (now Ganja, Azerbaijan)
- Died: May 2, 1968 (aged 56); Moscow, Russian SFSR, USSR
- Burial place: Novodevichy Cemetery, Moscow, Russia; 55°43′29″N 37°33′15″E
- Citizenship: USSR

Ivan Ivanovich Agayants (Russian: Иван Иванович Агаянц) (28 August 1911 – 12 May 1968) was a leading Soviet NKVD/KGB intelligence officer of Armenian origin.

== Early life ==
Born the son of Hovhanes Agayants, priest of the Armenian Apostolic Church, in the town of Elizavetpol, in modern day Azerbaijan on 28 August 1911, he followed two elder brothers into the secret police. In 1930, he moved to Moscow to begin work in the OGPU economic department.

== Career ==
In 1936, as purges decimated secret police ranks, he was transferred into foreign intelligence, helped by his knowledge of foreign languages (which included Turkish, Persian, French, Spanish and English).

In 1937, he was sent to Paris, under cover first of the trade mission, then of the consular section of the Soviet embassy. After the fall of the Second Spanish Republic, he took part in the operation to remove the leaders of the Communist Party of Spain, José Díaz and Dolores Ibárruri, to Moscow.

He returned to Moscow in 1940, but was sent to Teheran in August 1941 as resident. On 1 August 1943, on Stalin's personal instructions, he flew to French Algeria to establish contact with the French general Charles de Gaulle. The task was completed, and soon de Gaulle met with Stalin in Moscow. He reportedly helped prevent a German operation to attack the three allied leaders meeting at the 1943 Teheran Conference. He returned to Moscow later that year.

In 1946, he managed to acquire the receipt of the Marshall Plan for the postwar policy of the United States and its allies in Europe. The secret version of this Plan was handed over to the members of the Soviet delegation. He then returned to the USSR in 1947.

From 1947 to 1949, he was again in Paris, this time as resident under the alias "Avalov". There he is said to have recruited numerous spies for the Soviet Union. However, his health was affected by tuberculosis he had acquired in the 1930s.

On his return to Moscow Agayants was appointed to head the Western European Department of what would become the KGB. After working on forgeries of memoirs sponsored by the Soviet secret police to further the leadership's political goals, and, as part of Operation Seat 12, helping to produce a play The Deputy that maligned Pius XII, he was appointed the first head of Department D (disinformation) of the KGB First Chief Directorate.

In 1967, Agayants was appointed deputy head of the First Chief Directorate, but died on 12 May 1968. He is buried in Moscow's Novodevichy Cemetery.

During his lifetime he was given many awards by the Soviet government, including the Order of Lenin, and his name is engraved in gold on the wall of Russia's Foreign Intelligence Service headquarters in Moscow among the seventy or so leading intelligence officers.
