= Orientales omnes Ecclesias =

1945 papal encyclical by Pius XII

Orientales omnes Ecclesias Latin for 'All the Eastern Churches' Encyclical of Pope Pius XII
- Signature date: 23 December 1945
- Subject: Commemoration of the 350th anniversary of the Union of Brest
- Number: 8 of 41 of the pontificate
- Text: In Latin; In English

Orientales omnes Ecclesias (December 23, 1945) is an encyclical of Pope Pius XII to the faithful of the Ukrainian Greek Catholic Church. It commemorates the three hundred and fiftieth anniversary of the Union of Brest.

In his encyclical, Pope Pius XII explains that many trials and persecutions took place in the last three hundred and fifty years, but that the Ukrainian Greek Catholic Church always came out strong. He reminds of the many favours and assistances the Church received from Rome and how his papal predecessors always supported the independent culture and rite of the Oriental Church. In the last part of the encyclical, he addresses the grievances facing the Ukrainians in 1945.

== Encyclical background ==
While most Ukrainian Christians belong to an Eastern Orthodox Church, some, like the members of Ukrainian Greek Catholic Church and the Ruthenian Greek Catholic Church, are united with Rome, which allowed them to keep their own Oriental liturgy and church laws. Ruthenian Catholics call themselves Rusyns. They are closely related to the Ukrainians and speak a dialect of the same language. The traditional Rusyn homeland extends into northeast Slovakia and the Lemko region of southeast Poland. The area was a part of Austria-Hungary until the aftermath of World War I. After the Ukrainians and part of the Ruthenians came under the authority of the Poles, who follow the Latin Church, they faced Polonisation and other significant challenges. Some Ruthenians, resisting Polonisation, felt deserted by the Vatican and returned to the Orthodox Church. After World War II, in 1945, Polish and Czechoslovak areas became part of the Soviet Union, which exerted pressure on Greek Catholics to sever relations with Rome and join the Orthodox Church headed by the Patriarch of Moscow. It was claimed that (1) the union with Rome was a Polish conspiracy to dominate and wipe out the culture of the Ukrainian Greek Catholic Church; (2) Orthodox faithful and priests united to Rome had to suffer under Polish bishops of the Latin Rite and Polonisation; (3) but now they are liberated by the Soviet Army under the leadership of Marshal Joseph Stalin and therefore continued ties to Rome are no longer necessary. The new Patriarch Alexius I called on Catholics for a separation from Rome:

Liberate yourself! You must break the Vatican chains which throw you into the abyss of error, darkness and spiritual decay. Hurry, return to your true mother, the Russian Orthodox Church!

Pope Pius XII answered: "Who does not know that Patriarch Alexius I, recently elected by the dissident bishops of Russia, openly exalts and preaches defection from the Catholic Church in a letter lately addressed to the Ruthenian Church, a letter which contributes not a little to the persecution?" He mentions the United Nations proclamation that religious persecution will never happen again: "This had given us hope that peace and true liberty would be granted everywhere to the Catholic Church, the more so since the Church has always taught, and teaches, that obedience to the ordinances of the lawfully established civil power, within the sphere and bounds of its authority, is a duty of conscience. But, unfortunately, the events we have mentioned have grievously and bitterly weakened, have almost destroyed, our hope and confidence so far as the lands of the Ruthenians are concerned."

== Persecution ==
Pius knew about the attempts to separate the United Churches from Rome, and he also was aware that, in the months preceding the encyclical, all Catholic bishops of the Ukrainian Church had been arrested, including Josyf Slipyj, Gregory Chomysyn, John Laysevkyi, Nicolas Carneckyi and Josaphat Kocylovskyi. Some, including Bishop Nicetas Budka, perished in Siberia. Subjected to Stalinist Show Trials, they all received severe sentencing. The remaining leaders of the hierarchies and the heads of all seminaries and Episcopal offices were arrested and tried in 1945 and 1946. On July 1, 1945, some three hundred priests of the United Church wrote to Molotov; they protested the arrest of all bishops and large parts of the Catholic clergy. After the Church was thus robbed of all its leadership, a "spontaneous movement" for separation from Rome and unification with the Russian Orthodox Church developed. Mass arrests of priests followed. In Lemko, some five hundred priests were jailed in 1945 or sent to a Gulag, officially called "an unknown destination because of political reasons". In order to address this problem, Pius decided to engage in a comprehensive historical review of the reunion and its advantages to the faithful in Ukraine.

== History of the Reunion ==
The Pope repeats assurances of his predecessors that the oriental rites will be honoured. There will be no attempt by the Vatican to change or abandon them. The Pope reviews the history of the Ruthenian Church, which led to the unification with Rome. The Church was in disarray and needed reform; it experienced decadence and abuses. Towards the end of the 16th century, it became obvious that there was no hope of achieving renewal and reform of the Ruthenian Church except by restoring union with the Apostolic See. Prolonged and difficult negotiations were necessary before a unity application could be achieved in 1596. Pope Clement VIII on December 23, 1595, met the emissaries. They read the declaration of all the bishops before the illustrious assembly and then in their own name and that of the other bishops made a solemn profession of faith and promised due obedience and respect.

At the end of the nineteenth and the beginning of the 20th century, economic conditions led to the emigration of many from Galicia to the US, Canada and South America. Pope Pius X feared that these emigrants may lose heir religious identity, and in 1907 he appointed a bishop with special faculties for them. Later on, since the number and the needs of these Catholics were increasing, a special ordinary bishop was appointed for Galician Catholics in the United States and another in Canada besides the ordinary bishop, for the faithful of this rite who had emigrated from Ukraine, Russia, Hungary or Yugoslavia.

== After the encyclical ==
From 1945 to 1958, six Ukrainian bishops were murdered, sentenced to death or died in the Gulag. In 1949, Pope Pius made Josyf Slipyj cardinal in pectore, that is, for his own safety it remained a secret. In 1957, he congratulated him on the 40th anniversary of his priesthood. But Slipyj remained jailed until 1963. The Ruthenian Church continued to suffer. The Soviet authorities initiated persecution of the Ruthenian Church in the newly acquired region. In 1946 the Uzhorod seminary was closed. In 1949 the Ruthenian Catholic Church was integrated into the Russian Orthodox Church. Rusyns on the other side of the Czechoslovak border were also forced to become Orthodox, while those in the Polish Lemko region were deported en masse in 1947 either to the Soviet Union or to other parts of Poland.
