= Rudolf Rahn =

German diplomat (1900–1975)

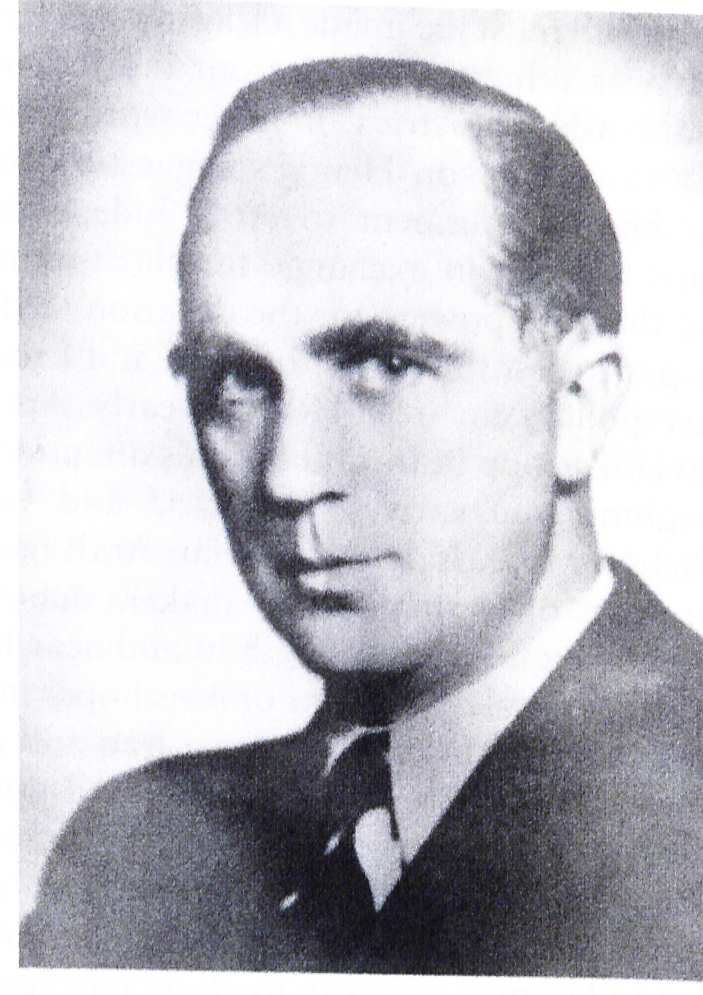
- Official photo, c. 1939

German Plenipotentiary of Italy
- In office 23 September 1943 – 25 April 1945
- Preceded by: Office established
- Succeeded by: Office abolished

Personal details
- Born: 16 March 1900 Ulm, Württemberg, German Empire
- Died: 7 January 1975 (aged 74) Düsseldorf, North Rhine-Westphalia, Federal Republic of Germany
- Party: NSDAP

Rudolf Rahn (16 March 1900 – 7 January 1975) was a German diplomat who served the Weimar Republic and Nazi Germany.

Rahn spent most of the 1930s at the German Embassy in Ankara, Turkey, then two years in Lisbon. In August 1940, he was posted to Paris. From May 1941, he was political officer in Syria and from November held the same appointment in Tunisia. In 1943, he became Ambassador to Rome, then was Plenipotentiary of the Italian Social Republic in the closing stages of the Second World War. A member of the Nazi Party, at the end of the war Rahn was arrested and held at Nuremberg as a potential war criminal, but he was released in 1949 and deemed to be denazified in Class V (exonerated).

Apart from his memoirs, Rahn wrote on political science and was also a published poet.

== Early life and education ==
Born at Ulm, on the Danube, Rahn was the son of a notary. After attending the gymnasium (a form of high school) in Esslingen, he studied political science and sociology at the Universities of Tübingen, Berlin, and Heidelberg, and in 1923 gained a doctorate. He then spent some years studying and travelling in other countries.

== Career ==
In 1928, Rahn joined the German Foreign Office as an attaché, in 1931 was posted to the German Embassy in Ankara, where three years later he was appointed Secretary of the Legation. In 1938 he was posted to the German Embassy in Lisbon and in August 1940, to the German Embassy in Paris. In May 1941, he became political officer in Syria under the Italian Armistice Commission and from November 1941 to May 1943 held the same appointment under the commanding officer of German forces in Tunisia.

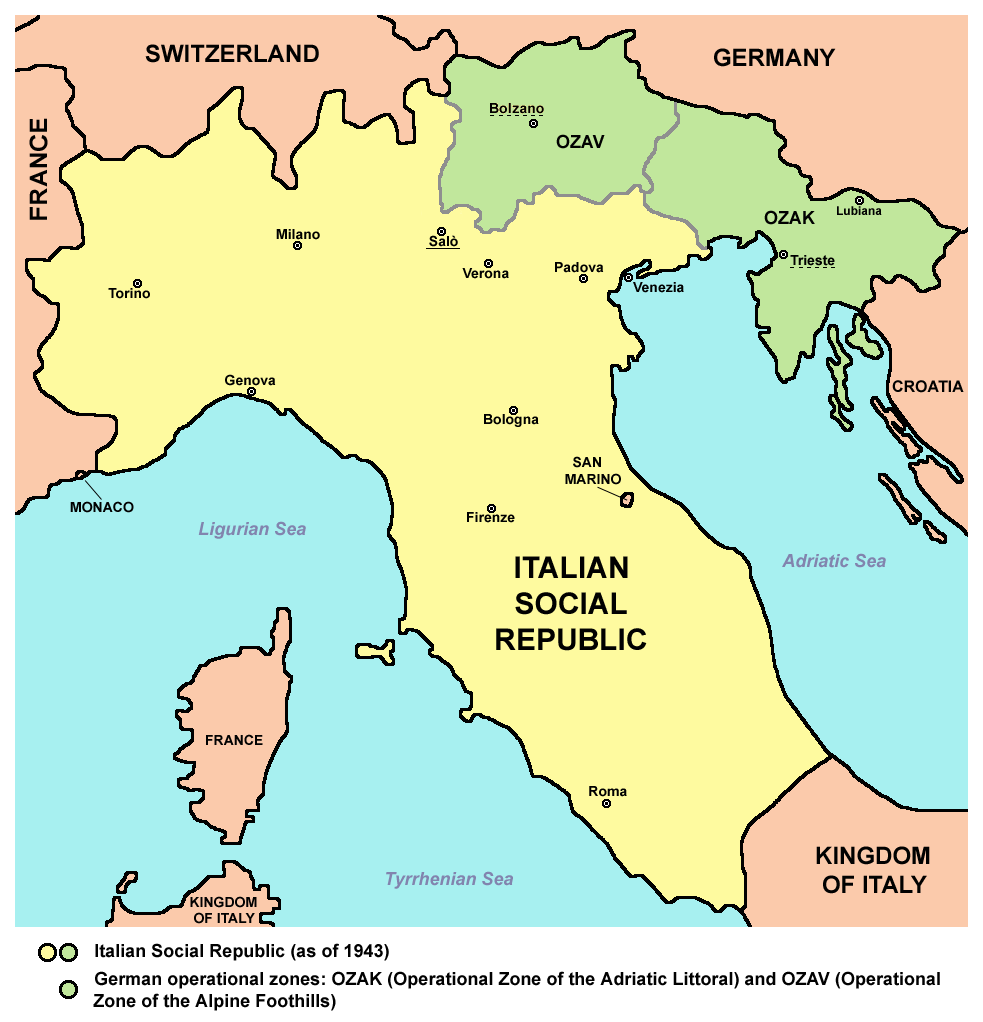
Italian Social Republic (RSI) 1943-1945 German military operational zones (OZAV/OZAK) under direct German administration

After a brief return to his old post at the German embassy in Paris, in August 1943 Rahn was sent as German Ambassador to Rome, where he was at the centre of efforts to discourage King Victor Emmanuel III of Italy and the Grand Fascist Council from making a separate peace with the Allies. In the closing stages of the Second World War, after the Germans had installed the Italian Social Republic under Benito Mussolini as a puppet regime in northern Italy, Rahn was German Plenipotentiary to the new republic, wielding real power, having been appointed in September 1943 by a specific order of Adolf Hitler. According to one history of the war,

Mussolini had no control over the affairs of the Italian Social Republic, a police state run with Italian collaborators by the Nazi proconsul, Rudolf Rahn, and the army commander, General Wolff."

There is uncertainty about Rahn's role in the deportation of the 8,000 Jews of Rome in October 1943. On 6 October Friedrich Möllhausen sent a message to Ribbentrop, reporting that Obersturmbannführer Herbert Kappler of the SS had been ordered to arrest the Jews of the city and take them to Upper Italy, "where they are to be liquidated", and that the commandant of Rome, General Stahel, was opposed to this. Ribbentrop visited Hitler at the Wolf's Lair and later ordered that Rahn and Möllhausen be informed "that by a Führer Directive the 8,000 Jews living in Rome are to be taken to Mauthausen, Upper Danube, as hostages". Whatever Hitler's intention, the 8,000 Jews were sent north and killed by the SS. This episode has been used several times by David Irving to suggest that Hitler himself was more moderate than others with regard to the killing of Jews.

On 9 October 1944, Admiral Miklós Horthy, Regent of Hungary, a German ally, announced the conclusion of a separate peace with the Soviets. Veesenmayer and Rahn persuaded Colonel Ferenc Szálasi to form a new National Assembly at Esztergom, and together Veesenmayer and Rahn visited Horthy, telling him his son Miklós was a Gestapo hostage, having been kidnapped by German commandos led by Otto Skorzeny. On 15 October Germany launched Operation Panzerfaust, to remove Horthy from power, and on 17 October Horthy agreed to appoint a new pro-German Government of National Unity led by the fascist Arrow Cross Party.

Because of his final role in Italy, Rahn was arrested and faced the possibility of standing accused of war crimes at the Nuremberg Trials at the end of the war. While in prison for four years, he wrote on Talleyrand, supplementing earlier work in the 1920s, and also drafted his memoirs. In the preparation of the Wilhelmstrasse Trial, in which his colleagues Ernst von Weizsäcker and Gustav Adolf Steengracht von Moyland were convicted, Rahn was at first listed as one of the German diplomats who should be prosecuted. On 31 October 1945, a report on Rahn was filed which resulted in his being held for further investigations. Between 27 May and 4 December 1947 he was interrogated eight times. On 7 June 1949 he was classified as denazified in Class V (exonerated), especially in view of his argument that through diplomatic channels he had saved about 1,800 people who had been taken prisoner by the Gestapo in North Africa.

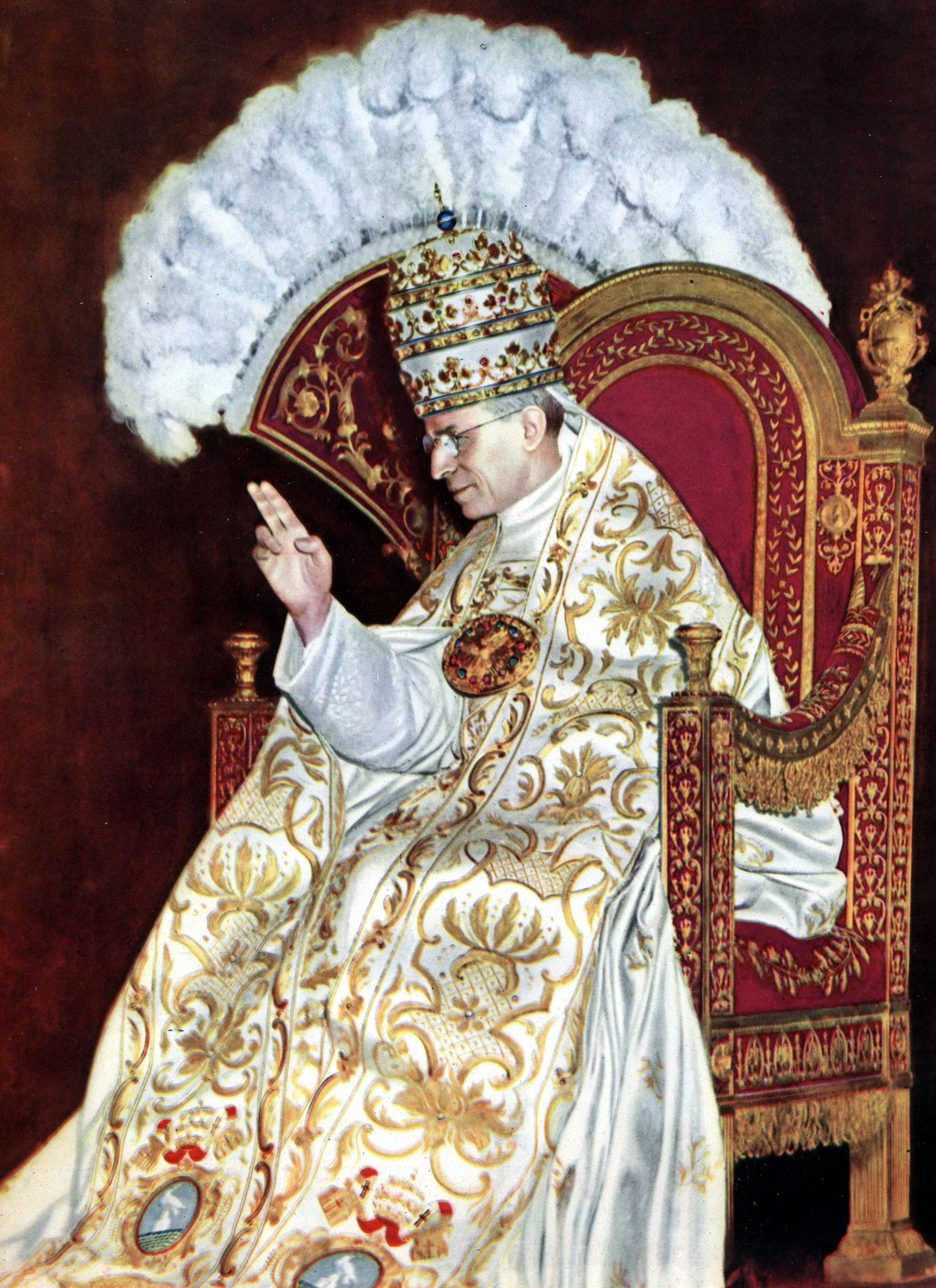
Pope Pius XII, whose proposed abduction Rahn said he had opposed

In 1960 Rahn attended the Stahlhelm funeral at Bad Wiessee of Generalfeldmarschall Albert Kesselring, with Franz von Papen, Grossadmiral Karl Dönitz, Ferdinand Schörner, Otto Remer, Siegfried Westphal, and Josef Kammhuber, former SS officers Sepp Dietrich and Joachim Peiper.

In the early 1970s Rahn sent a letter to Robert A. Graham, one of the editors of the Acts and Documents of the Holy See related to the Second World War, which was published in 1991 by the Italian magazine 30 Giorni, stating that a German plot to kidnap Pope Pius XII had existed, but that all documents relating to it had been destroyed or lost. Rahn wrote to Graham

We agreed that carrying out such a plan would have had tremendous consequences and that it had to be blocked at all costs.

Rahn died in Düsseldorf on 7 January 1975.

== Awards and decorations ==
- Knight's Cross of the War Merit Cross (22 June 1943)
- Iron Cross of 1939, 1st class

== Publications ==
- Das Reich in der Verfassungsidee von 1848 und 1919 ["The Reich in the Constitutional Idea of 1848 and 1919"] (Heidelberg: 1924, thesis)
- Ruheloses Leben: Aufzeichnungen und Erinnerungen ["A Restless Life: notes and recollections"] (Düsseldorf: Diederichs Verlag, 1949)
- Talleyrand. Portrait und Dokumente ["Talleyrand: a portrait and documents"] (Tübingen: H. Laupp'sche Buchhandlung, 1949)
- Ambasciatore di Hitler a Vichy e a Saló ["Hitler's Ambassador to Vichy and to Salo"] (Milan: Garzanti, 1950)
- Anker im Bosporus und spätere Gedichte ["Anchor in the Bosphorus and later poems"] (Düsseldorf: 1973)
