= Alois Hudal =

Catholic bishop and Nazi supporter

The Right Reverend Alois Karl Hudal
- Titular Bishop of Aela
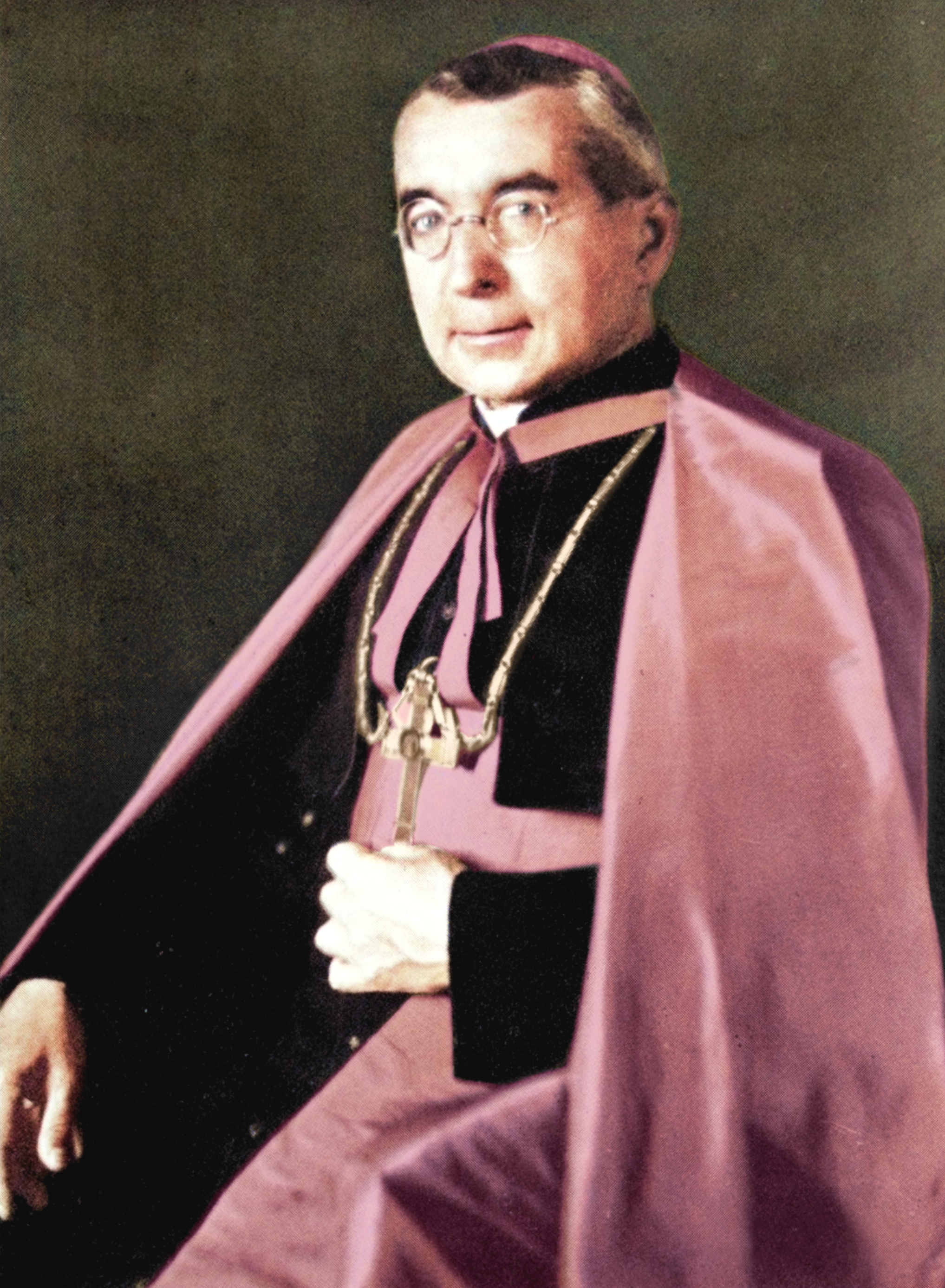
- Colourized photograph of Hudal from the title page of his book The Foundations of National Socialism (1937)
- Church: Catholic Church
- Installed: 1933
- Term ended: 1963
- Predecessor: Charles-Marie-Félix de Gorostarzu
- Successor: Trịnh Văn Căn
- Other post: Rector of Collegio Teutonico (1923-1952)

Orders
- Ordination: July 1908
- Consecration: June 1933 by Eugenio Pacelli (later Pope Pius XII)

Personal details
- Born: 31 May 1885 Graz, Austria-Hungary
- Died: 13 May 1963 (aged 77) Grottaferrata, Rome, Italy
- Education: University of Graz; Collegio Teutonico
- Motto: Ecclesiae et Nationi
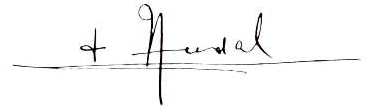
- Signature

Alois Karl Hudal (also known as Luigi Hudal; 31 May 1885 – 13 May 1963) was an Austrian bishop of the Catholic Church based in Rome. For thirty years, he was the head of the Austrian-German congregation of Santa Maria dell'Anima in Rome and, until 1937, an influential representative of the Catholic Church in Austria.

In his 1937 book, The Foundations of National Socialism, Hudal praised Adolf Hitler and his policies and indirectly attacked Vatican policies. After World War II, Hudal helped establish the ratlines, which allowed prominent Nazi German and other European former Axis officers and political leaders, among them accused war criminals such as Adolf Eichmann, to escape Allied trials and denazification.

== Biography ==
=== Education ===
Alois Hudal, the son of a shoemaker, was born on 31 May 1885 in Graz, Austria, and studied theology there from 1904 to 1908. He was ordained to the priesthood in July 1908.

Hudal became a specialist on the liturgy, doctrine and spirituality of the Slavic-speaking Eastern Orthodox Churches while a parish priest in Kindberg. In 1911, he earned a Doctor of Sacred Theology degree at the University of Graz. He entered the Teutonic College of Santa Maria dell'Anima in Rome, where he was a chaplain from 1911 to 1913 and attended courses in Old Testament at the Pontifical Biblical Institute. He earned his Doctor of Sacred Scripture degree with a dissertation on Die religiösen und sittlichen Ideen des Spruchbuches ("The Religious and Moral Ideas of the Book of Proverbs"), published in 1914. He joined the faculty for Old Testament studies at the University of Graz in 1914. During the First World War, he was a military chaplain. In 1917, he published a book of his sermons to the soldiers, Soldatenpredigten, in which he expressed the idea that "loyalty to the flag is loyalty to God", though also warning against "national chauvinism".

In 1923, he was named rector of the Collegio Teutonico di Santa Maria dell'Anima (known simply as "Anima") in Rome, a theological seminary for German and Austrian priests. In 1930, he was appointed a consultant to the Holy Office by Cardinal Rafael Merry del Val, its prefect.

=== Early activities ===
Ludwig von Pastor, an Austrian diplomat, introduced Hudal to Pope Pius XI in 1922, and recommended Hudal's study of the Serbo-Croatian National Church to him. On 5 February 1923, he recommended Hudal for a position at the Anima, mainly because he was Austrian. Von Pastor was concerned that Austria, which had just lost World War I and with it much influence, would lose the Anima to a German, Dutch or Belgian candidate. The pope agreed to name Hudal later that month.

Hudal became the public face of advocacy for Austria, the Austrian bishops' conference, and Austrian prestige in the Vatican, as German groups attempted to reestablish their influence at the Anima. Pope Pius XI supported Hudal, though he rejected requests to make Hudal responsible for pastoral care of the German community.

In 1924, Hudal, in a Vatican ceremony in the presence of Pope Pius XI, Cardinal Secretary of State Pietro Gasparri and numerous cardinals, delivered a speech in praise of von Pastor to mark the 40th anniversary of the publication of Pastor's History of the Popes From the Close of the Middle Ages.

In June 1933, Hudal was consecrated titular bishop of Aela by Cardinal Eugenio Pacelli (future Pius XII), who had succeeded Merry del Val as the cardinal protector of the German national church at Rome.

In April 1938, Hudal helped organise a vote of German and Austrian clerics at the German college of Santa Maria dell'Anima on the question of the German annexation of Austria (Anschluss). The vote took place on the German heavy cruiser Admiral Scheer, anchored in the Italian harbour of Gaeta. More than 90% voted against the Anschluss, an outcome partisans of German expansion named the "Shame of Gaeta" (Italian: Vergogna di Gaeta; German: Schande von Gaeta).

=== Nationalism and conspiracies ===
From 1933 on, Hudal publicly embraced the pan-Germanic nationalism he had previously condemned, proclaiming that he wished to be a "servant and herald" of "the total German cause".

His invective against Jews became more frequent, linking the so-called "Semitic race" – which "sought to set itself apart and dominate" – with the nefarious movements of democracy and internationalism and alleged a Jewish bankers' conspiracy to become "the financial masters of the Eternal City". In 1935, he wrote a preface to an Italian biography of the Austrian politician Engelbert Dollfuss without mentioning that he had been murdered by Austrian Nazis during a coup attempt the previous year.

=== Perception of Bolshevism and liberalism as enemies ===
Hudal was a committed anti-communist and opposed liberalism. Before the rise of Nazism, he was already critical of parliamentary governance. His ideas were similar to the political and economic ideas of such authoritarian and/or fascist politicians as Engelbert Dollfuss and Kurt Schuschnigg (Austria), Franz von Papen (Germany), and António de Oliveira Salazar (Portugal). According to author Greg Whitlock: "Hudal squarely fitted into a formula current at the time, the category of Clerical-Fascism."

Hudal was most concerned with the rise of the international communist movement and worker parties in Austria. Fear of Bolshevism was his starting point, but this feeling turned into an aggressive political doctrine towards Russia: "Essential to understanding Hudal's politics is his fear that Bolshevist military forces would invade Italy through Eastern Europe or the Balkans and would be unstoppable until they destroyed the Church. Like many within the Church, he embraced the bulwark theory, which placed hope in a strong German-Austrian military shield to protect Rome. This protection involved a pre-emptive attack on communism, Hudal believed, and so he felt an urgent need for a Christian army from Central Europe to invade Russia and eliminate the Bolshevist threat to Rome".

He had another reason to hope for a German-led defeat of Russia. His long-term goals were "the reunification of Rome with the Eastern Orthodox Church and the conversion of the Balkans from the Serbian Orthodox Church to Catholicism". He expected that the invasion of the Soviet Union by European forces would serve these aims. Since the Russian Revolution of 1917 had crushed the Russian Orthodox Church, Hudal and other Catholics saw a historic opportunity to help Russian Christians with aid "and conversion", ending the thousand-year East–West Schism that divided Christianity.

=== "Good" and "bad" National Socialism ===
Hudal is said to have received a Golden Party Badge, but this is disputed. In Vienna in 1937, Hudal published a book entitled The Foundations of National Socialism, with an imprimatur from Archbishop Theodor Innitzer, in which he enthusiastically endorsed Hitler. Hudal sent Hitler a copy with a handwritten dedication praising him as "the new Siegfried of Germany's greatness".

The Nazis did not officially ban the book but did not allow it to circulate in Germany. After the end of World War II, Franz von Papen declared that Hudal's book had "very much impressed" Hitler, and he blamed Hitler's "anti-Christian advisers" for not allowing a German edition to circulate. "All I could obtain was permission to print 2,000 copies, which Hitler wanted to distribute among leading Party members for a study of the problem", von Papen claimed.

Hudal criticized the works of several Nazi ideologues, like Alfred Rosenberg and Ernst Bergmann, who despised Christianity and considered it "alien to Germanic genius". The condemnation by the Holy Office of Rosenberg's The Myth of the Twentieth Century in 1934 and, shortly thereafter, of Bergmann's The German National Church had been based on Hudal's assessment of those works.

In his own 1937 book, Hudal proposed a reconciliation and a pragmatic compromise between Nazism and Christianity, leaving the education of youth to the churches, while leaving politics entirely to Nazism. This had been the line followed by German Catholic politician and former Reich Chancellor Franz von Papen. In the autumn of 1934, Hudal had explained this strategy to Pius XI: the "good" ought to be isolated from the "bad" in Nazism. The bad – Rosenberg, Bergmann, Himmler and others – according to Hudal represented the "left wing" of the Nazi party. The Nazi "conservatives", headed by Hitler in this interpretation, should be directed toward Rome, Christianized and used against the communists and the Eastern danger. Hitler's book, Mein Kampf, was never put on the Index by Rome, as censors continually postponed and eventually terminated its examination, balking at taking him on directly.

By 1935, Hudal had become influential in creating a proposed list of "errors and heresies" of the era, condemning several racist errors of Nazi politicians, the Nuremberg Laws, and also condemning several statements taken directly from Mein Kampf; this list was accepted by Pope Pius XI as an adequate condemnation, but he wanted an encyclical rather than a mere syllabus or list of errors. Three years later, in June 1938, Pius ordered the American Jesuit John LaFarge to prepare an encyclical condemning antisemitism, racism and the persecution of Jews. Together with fellow Jesuits Gustav Gundlach (Germany) and Gustave Desbuquois (France), LaFarge produced a draft for an encyclical which was on Pius XI's desk when he died. It was never promulgated by Pius XII.

Rosenberg's reaction to Hudal's ideas was severe, and the circulation of The Foundations of National Socialism was restricted in Germany. "We do not allow the fundaments of the Movement to be analyzed and criticized by a Roman Bishop", said Rosenberg. In 1935, even before he wrote The Foundations of National Socialism Hudal had said about Rosenberg: "If National Socialism wants to replace Christianity by the notions of race and blood, we will have to face the greatest heresy of the twentieth century. It must be rejected by the Church as decisively as, if not more severely than ... the Action Française, with which it shares some errors. But Rosenberg's doctrine is more imbued with negation and creates, above all in the youth, a hatred against Christianity greater than that of Nietzsche".

Despite the restrictions imposed on his book, and despite Nazi restrictions against German monasteries and parishes, and attempts by the Nazi government to forbid Catholic education at schools, going as far as banning the crucifix in schools and other public areas (the Oldenburg crucifix struggle of November 1936), and despite the Nazi dissolution and confiscation of Austrian monasteries and the official banning of Catholic newspapers and associations in Austria, Hudal remained close to some Nazi officials, as he was convinced that the Nazi new order would nevertheless prevail in Europe due to its "force".

Hudal was particularly close to von Papen, who as the Reich's ambassador in Vienna prepared the German-Austrian agreement of 11 July 1936, which some claim paved the way for the Anschluss. This agreement was backed by Hudal in the Austrian press, against the position of several Austrian bishops.

=== Vatican reaction ===
When, in 1937, Hudal published his book on the foundations of Nazism, Church authorities were upset because of his deviation from Church policy and teachings. Hudal, without mentioning names, had openly questioned the Vatican policy of Pope Pius XI and Eugenio Pacelli towards Nazism, which culminated in the encyclical Mit brennender Sorge, in which the Vatican openly attacked National Socialism. The 1937 Hudal book froze his steady rise in Rome and resulted in his leaving the city after the war. His publication like his two previous, Rom, Christentum und deutsches Volk (1935) and Deutsches Volk und christliches Abendland (1935) did not have an imprimatur or ecclesiastical approval, which was another reason for the cooling of relations with the Vatican. Hudal had proposed a "truly Christian National Socialism": education and church affairs would be controlled by the Church, while political discourse would remain exclusively National Socialist. However, the Nazis had no intention of giving up education to the Church.

Together – according to Hudal – Church and state in Germany would fight against communism. Hudal saw a direct link between Jews and Marxism, lamenting their alleged dominance in academic occupations, and supporting segregation legislation against Jews in order to protect against foreign influence.

=== Break with the Vatican ===
Hudal, previously a popular and influential guest in the Vatican, lived from 1938 on, in isolation, in the Anima College. This position he was forced to resign in 1952. Hudal's 1933 promotion to bishop has been cited as evidence that he had close ties to members of the Roman Curia, particularly Cardinal Merry del Val (who died in 1930) and Cardinal Secretary of State Eugenio Pacelli, the future Pius XII, who had been papal nuncio in Germany. His close relationship with Pacelli and Pius XI stopped immediately after the publication of his book in 1937, which was seen as contradicting Mit brennender Sorge and the 1933 Reichskonkordat.

=== Hudal during World War II ===
Hudal's exile within Rome continued during World War II. He continued as pastoral head of the Anima Church and College but had no position in the Vatican and no access to Pope Pius XII or his senior staff. The French Jesuit historian Pierre Blet, co-editor of Acts and Documents, mentioned Hudal only once, stating that the pope's nephew Carlo Pacelli saw Hudal, and after this meeting, Hudal wrote to the military governor of Rome, General Reiner Stahel, and urged him to suspend all actions against Jews. The Germans suspended the actions "out of the consideration for the special character of Rome".

According to another author, however, the idea of Hudal's intervention came from the German ambassador himself, who asked the rector of the Anima to sign a letter to the military commander of Rome, General Reiner Stahel, requesting that the arrests be halted, otherwise the Pope would take a position in public against the arrests and the German occupiers. Ambassador Ernst von Weizsäcker, it was argued, had chosen this ruse because Hitler might have reacted against the Vatican and the Pope if it had been the German embassy conveying the warning, instead of the Nazi-friendly bishop. However, this account is seriously undermined by Hudal's claim in his Memories that it was the nephew of Pius XII, Carlo Pacelli, who came to see him and inspired the letter and by Dr Rainer Decker's discovery among Hudal's papers in the Anima of the original typewritten draft of the letter sent to Stahel. This draft, which is much longer than the excerpt from it sent to Berlin, contains Hudal's handwritten corrections, introductory greetings to Stahel recalling their mutual acquaintance Captain Diemert, and a final paragraph noting that, as had previously been discussed last March, Germany might need the good offices of the Vatican in the near future. These details could not have been known to Ambassador Weizsäcker or any of the other diplomats. And this leaves little doubt that the letter was written by Bishop Hudal himself and by no one else, and that it was initiated by a visit from Pius XII's nephew Carlo Pacelli on the morning of 16 October 1943.

During the war, Hudal sheltered victims of the Nazis at Santa Maria dell'Anima, used by the Resistance. Lieutenant John Burns, a New Zealander, gave a description of it when recalling his escape from an Italian POW camp in 1944.

According to several sources, Hudal may have been a Vatican-based informer to German intelligence under the Nazi regime, either the Abwehr of Wilhelm Canaris or the Reich Security Main Office. A Vatican historian, Father Robert A. Graham SJ, expressed that view in his book Nothing Sacred. Several other authors mention his contacts in Rome with SS intelligence chief Walter Rauff. In September 1943, Rauff was sent to Milan, where he took charge of all Gestapo and SD operations throughout northwest Italy. Hudal is said to have met Rauff then and to have begun some cooperation with him that was useful afterwards in the establishment of an escape network for Nazis, including for Rauff himself. After the war, Rauff escaped from a prisoner camp in Rimini and "hid in a number of Italian convents, apparently under the protection of Bishop Alois Hudal".

=== Ratline organizer ===
After 1945, Hudal continued to be isolated from the Vatican. In his native Austria, his pro-Nazi book was now openly discussed and critiqued. In 1945, Allied-occupied Austria forced Hudal to give up his Graz professorship; however, Hudal appealed on a technicality and regained it two years later.

After 1945, Hudal worked on the ratlines, helping former Nazis and Ustasha families to find safe haven in overseas countries. He viewed it as "a charity to people in dire need, for persons without any guilt who are to be made scapegoats for the failures of an evil system." He used the services of the Austrian Office (Österreichisches Bureau) in Rome, which had the necessary identity cards (carta di riconoscimento), for migration mainly to Arab and South American countries. It is also alleged that the president of the International Red Cross Carl Jacob Burckhardt and Cardinal Antonio Caggiano were also involved in the "ratlines".

It is unclear whether he was an official appointee of the papal refugee organization Pontificia Commissione di Assistenza ("Pontifical Commission of Assistance" – PCA) or whether he acted as de facto head of the Catholic Austrian community in Rome. He is credited with helping, networking and organising the escape of war criminals such as Franz Stangl, commanding officer of Treblinka. Stangl told Gitta Sereny that he went looking for Hudal in Rome as he had heard that the bishop was helping all Germans. Hudal arranged quarters in Rome for him until his carta di riconoscimento came through, then gave him money and a visa to Syria. Stangl left for Damascus, where the bishop found him a job in a textile factory.

Other prominent Nazi war criminals allegedly helped by the Hudal network were SS Captain Eduard Roschmann, Josef Mengele, the "Angel of Death" at Auschwitz; Gustav Wagner, SS sergeant at Sobibor; Alois Brunner, organizer of deportations from France and Slovakia to German concentration camps; and Adolf Eichmann, the man in charge of running the murder of European Jewry.

In 1994, Erich Priebke, a former SS captain, told Italian journalist Emanuela Audisio of la Repubblica, that Hudal helped him reach Buenos Aires, verified by Church historian Robert A. Graham, a Jesuit priest from the United States.

In 1945, Hudal gave refuge to Otto Wächter. From 1939 onward, as governor of the Kraków district, Wächter organized the persecution of the Jews and ordered the establishment of the Kraków Ghetto in 1941. Wächter is mentioned as one of the leading advocates in the General Government who were in favour of the Jewish extermination by gassing and as a member of the SS team who under Himmler's supervision and Odilo Globocnik's direction planned Operation Reinhard, the first phase of the Final Solution, leading to the death of more than 2,000,000 Polish Jews. After the war, Wächter lived in a Roman monastery "as a monk", under Hudal's protection. Wächter died on 14 July 1949 in the Santo Spirito hospital in Rome.

While his official status was minor, Hudal clearly played a role in the ratlines. In 1999, Italian researcher Matteo Sanfilippo revealed a letter drafted on 31 August 1948 by Bishop Hudal to Argentinian President Juan Perón, requesting 5,000 visas, 3,000 for German and 2,000 for Austrian "soldiers". In the letter, Hudal explained that these were not (Nazi) refugees, but anti-communist fighters "whose wartime sacrifice" had saved Europe from Soviet domination.

According to Argentine researcher Uki Goñi, the documents he uncovered in 2003 show the Catholic Church was also deeply involved in the secret network. "The Perón government authorized the arrival of the first Nazi collaborators [in Argentina], as a result of a meeting in March 1946 between Antonio Caggiano, a [newly elevated] Argentine cardinal, and Eugène Tisserant, a French cardinal attached to the Vatican".

After the war, Hudal was one of the main Catholic organizers of the ratline nets, along with Monsignor Karlo Petranović, himself an Ustasha war criminal who fled to Austria and then to Italy after 1945, (Note: According to Goñi, Monsignor Petranović "was himself a war criminal and Ustasha captain who had been deputy to the local Ustasha leader at Ogulin, a district that saw the extermination of some 2,000 Serbs during the war. ... The Monsignor organized and instigated many of these murders, personally directing the arrest and execution of 70 prominent Serbs." A request for his extradition by Yugoslavia "was ignored by the British authorities in 1947".) Father Edward Dömöter, a Franciscan of Hungarian origin who forged the identity of Eichmann's passport, issued by the Red Cross in the name of Ricardo Klement, and Father Krunoslav Draganović, a Croatian professor of theology.

Draganović, a smuggler of fascist and Ustasha war criminals who had also been involved in pro-fascist espionage, was recycled by the U.S. during the Cold War – his name appears in the Pentagon payrolls in the late 1950s and early 1960s – and was eventually granted immunity, ironically, in Tito's Yugoslavia, where he died in 1983 at age 79. Monsignor Karl Bayer, Rome's Director of Caritas International after the war, also cooperated with this ring. Interviewed in the 1970s by Gitta Sereny, Bayer recalled how he and Hudal had helped Nazis to South America with the Vatican's support: "The Pope [Pius XII] did provide money for this; in driblets sometimes, but it did come". Hudal's ratline was supposedly financed by his friend Walter Rauff, with some funds allegedly coming from Giuseppe Siri, the recently appointed auxiliary bishop (1944) and archbishop (1946) of Genoa. Siri, who would be elevated to cardinal in 1952, was regarded as "a hero of the Resistance movement in Italy" during the German occupation of northern Italy. Siri's involvement remains unproven.

According to Uki Goñi, "some of the financing for Hudal's escape network came from the United States", saying that the Italian delegate of the American National Catholic Welfare Conference provided Hudal "with substantial funds for his 'humanitarian' aid". Since the works of Graham and Blet were published, historian Michael Phayer, a professor at Marquette University, has alleged the close collaboration between the Vatican (Pope Pius XII and Giovanni Battista Montini, then "substitute" of the Secretariat of State, and later Paul VI) on the one side and Draganović and Hudal on the other, and has claimed that Pius XII himself was directly engaged in ratline activity. Against these allegations of the direct involvement of Pope Pius XII and his staff, there are some opposing testimonies and the denial by Vatican officials of any involvement of Pius XII himself. According to Phayer, Bishop Aloisius Muench, an American and Pius XII's own envoy to occupied western Germany after the war, "wrote to the Vatican warning the Pope to desist from his efforts to have convicted war criminals excused". The letter, written in Italian, is extant in the archives of Catholic University of America.

In his posthumously published memoirs, Hudal instead recalls with bitterness the lack of support he found from the Holy See to give to Nazi Germany's battle against "godless Bolshevism" at the Eastern Front. Hudal claims several times in this work to have received criticism of the Nazi system rather than support for it from the Vatican diplomats under Pius XII. He assumed that the Holy See's policy during and after the war was entirely controlled by the western Allies.

Until his own death, Hudal remained convinced he had done the right thing, and said he considered saving German and other fascist officers and politicians from the hands of Allied prosecution a "just thing" and "what should have been expected of a true Christian", adding: "We do not believe in the eye for an eye of the Jew."

Hudal said the justice of the Allies and the Soviets had resulted in show trials and lynchings, including the major trials at Nuremberg. In his memoirs, he developed a theory about the economic causes of World War II, which allowed him to plainly justify for himself his acts in favour of Nazi and fascist war criminals:

The Allies' War against Germany was not a crusade, but the rivalry of economic complexes for whose victory they had been fighting. This so-called business ... used catchwords like democracy, race, religious liberty and Christianity as a bait for the masses. All these experiences were the reason why I felt duty bound after 1945 to devote my whole charitable work mainly to former National Socialists and Fascists, especially to so-called "war criminals".

=== Resignation and death ===
Hudal's activities caused a press scandal in 1947 after he was accused of leading a Nazi smuggling ring by the Passauer Neue Presse, a German Catholic newspaper, but, as in 1923, playing the Austrian versus the Vatican and German cards, he only resigned as rector of Santa Maria dell'Anima in 1952, under joint pressure from German and Austrian bishops and the Holy See. In January 1952, the Bishop of Salzburg told Hudal that the Holy See wanted to dismiss him. In June, Hudal announced to the cardinal protector of Santa Maria dell'Anima that he had decided to leave the college, disapproving of what he viewed as the Church's governance by the Allies. He resided afterwards in Grottaferrata, near Rome, where in 1962 he wrote his embittered memoirs called Römische Tagebücher, Lebensbeichte eines alten Bischofs (Roman Diaries, Confessions of an Old Bishop), published posthumously in 1976.

Until his death in 1963, he never stopped trying to obtain amnesty for Nazis. (Note: In 1959–1960, for example, Hudal's correspondence shows his efforts to obtain an amnesty in Greece and West Germany.) Despite his protests against antisemitism in the 1930s, in his memoirs, with full knowledge of the Holocaust as of 1962, the "Brown Bishop" (as he was called in the German press) (Note: In 1949, Hudal was labelled in German church circles as "brauner Bischof", according to the German newspapers Nord Press (6 December 1949, p. 4) and the above-cited Passauer Neue Press (13 December 1949, p. 3).) said of his actions in favour of war criminals and genocide perpetrators and participants: "I thank God that He opened my eyes and allowed me to visit and comfort many victims in their prisons and concentration camps and [to help] them escape with false identity papers", referring to Nazi war criminals who were Axis prisoners of war in Allied detention camps.

After he was banned from Rome by Pius XII, Hudal withdrew to his residence in Grottaferrata, embittered towards Pius XII. He died in 1963. His diaries were published in Austria 13 years after his death and describe perceived Vatican injustices he experienced under Pius XI and Pius XII after the publication of his book. Hudal maintained the opinion that a bargain among socialism, nationalism and Christianity was the only realistic way of securing the future.

== Selected works ==
- Soldatenpredigten (Graz, 1917) – Sermons to the Soldiers.
- Die serbisch-orthodoxe Nationalkirche (Graz, 1922) – The Serbian Orthodox National Church.
- Vom deutschen Schaffen in Rom. Predigten, Ansprachen und Vorträge, (Innsbruck, Vienna and München, 1933) – On the German Work in Rome. Sermons, Speeches and Lectures.
- Die deutsche Kulturarbeit in Italien (Münster, 1934) – The German Cultural Activity in Italy.
- Ecclesiae et nationi. Katholische Gedanken in einer Zeitenwende (Rome, 1934) – The Church and the Nations. Catholic Thoughts in the Turn of an Era.
- Rom, Christentum und deutsches Volk (Rome, 1935) – Rome, the Christendom and the German People.
- Deutsches Volk und christliches Abendland (Innsbruck, 1935) – The German People and the Christian Occident.
- Der Vatikan und die modernen Staaten (Innsbruck, 1935) – The Vatican and the Modern States.
- Das Rassenproblem (Lobnig, 1935) – The Race Problem.
- Die Grundlagen des Nationalsozialismus: Eine ideengeschichtliche Untersuchung (Leipzig and Vienna, 1936–37 and facsimile edition Bremen, 1982) – The Foundations of National Socialism.
- Nietzsche und die moderne Welt (Rome, 1937) – Nietzsche and the Modern World.
- Europas religiöse Zukunft (Rome, 1943) – The Religious Future of Europe.
- Römische Tagebücher. Lebensbeichte eines alten Bischofs (Graz, 1976) – Diaries of Rome. The Confession of Life of an Old Bishop.

== See also ==
- Nuremberg trials

== Notes ==
=== Bibliography ===
- Aarons, Mark; Loftus, John (1998). Unholy Trinity (Revised ed.). New York: St. Martin's Griffin. ISBN 0-312-18199-X – via Internet Archive Book Reader.
- Blet, Pierre (1997). Pius XII and the Second World War: According to the Archives of the Vatican. New York: Paulist Press.
- Chenaux, Philippe (2003). "Pacelli, Hudal et la question du nazisme 1933–1938". Rivista di Storia della Chiesa in Italia. 57 (1): 133–54. JSTOR 43050086.
- Decker, Rainer (2019). "Bischof Alois Hudal und die Judenrazzia in Rom am 16. Oktober 1943". Römische Quartalschrift. 113 (3–4): 233–55.
- Godman, Peter (2004). Hitler and the Vatican. New York: Free Press. ISBN 9780743245975.
- Goñi, Uki (2002). The Real Odessa. How Perón Brought the Nazi War Criminals to Argentina. London, UK: Granta.
- Graham, Robert A.; Álvarez, David (1998). Nothing Sacred: Nazi Espionage against the Vatican, 1939–1945. London, UK: Frank Cass.
- Hudal, Alois (1937). Die Grundlagen des Nationalsozialismus: eine ideengeschichtliche Untersuchung. Leipzig & Vienna.
- Hudal, Alois (1976). Römische Tagebücher. Lebensbeichte eines alten Bischofs [Roman Diaries. The Confession of Life of an Old Bishop] (in German). Graz.
- Klee, Ernst (1991). Persilscheine und falsche Pässe. Wie die Kirchen den Nazis halfen [Whitewash Certificates and False Passports. How the Churches Helped the Nazis] (in German). Frankfurt: Fischer Geschichte.
- Klee, Ernst (2003). Das Personenlexikon zum Dritten Reich. Wer war was vor und nach 1945. Frankfurt am Main: S. Fischer Verlag.
- Kurzman, Dan (2007). A Special Mission: Hitler's Secret Plot to Seize the Vatican and Kidnap Pope Pius XII. Cambridge: Da Capo Press. ISBN 9780306814686.
- Phayer, Michael (2000). The Catholic Church and the Holocaust, 1930–1965. Bloomington and Indianapolis: Indiana University Press. ISBN 9780253337252.
- Phayer, Michael (2008). Pius XII, the Holocaust, and the Cold War. Bloomington and Indianapolis: Indiana University Press. ISBN 9780253349309.
- Sanfilippo, Matteo (1999). "Los papeles de Hudal como fuente para la historia de la migración de alemanes y nazis después de la segunda guerra mundial" [Hudal's papers as a source for the history of the migration of Germans and Nazis after World War II]. Estudios Migratorios Latinoamericanos (in Spanish). 43: 185–209.
- Sereny, Gitta (1974). Into that Darkness. London, UK: Deutsch.
- Stehle, Hansjakob (1981). Eastern Politics of the Vatican 1917–1979. Athens, OH: Ohio University Press. ISBN 9780821403679.
- Voigt, Klaus (1989). Zuflucht auf Widerruf. Exil in Italien 1933–1945 [Precarious refuge. Exile in Italy 1933–1945] (in German). Vol. I. Stuttgart: Klett-Cotta.
- von Pastor, Ludwig (1950). Tagebücher, Briefe Erinnerungen. Heidelberg.
- Whitlock, Greg (2003). "Alois C. Hudal: Clero-Fascist Nietzsche Critic". Nietzsche-Studien. 32 (1): 259–95. doi:10.1515/9783110179200.259. S2CID 169479701.
- Wolf, Hubert (2005). "Pius XI. und die 'Zeitirrtümer'. Die Initiativen der römischen Inquisition gegen Rassismus und Nationalismus" (PDF). Vierteljahrshefte für Zeitgeschichte. 53 (1): 1–42.
