= Alleged plot to kidnap Pope Pius XII =

Alleged 1943 Nazi kidnapping plot

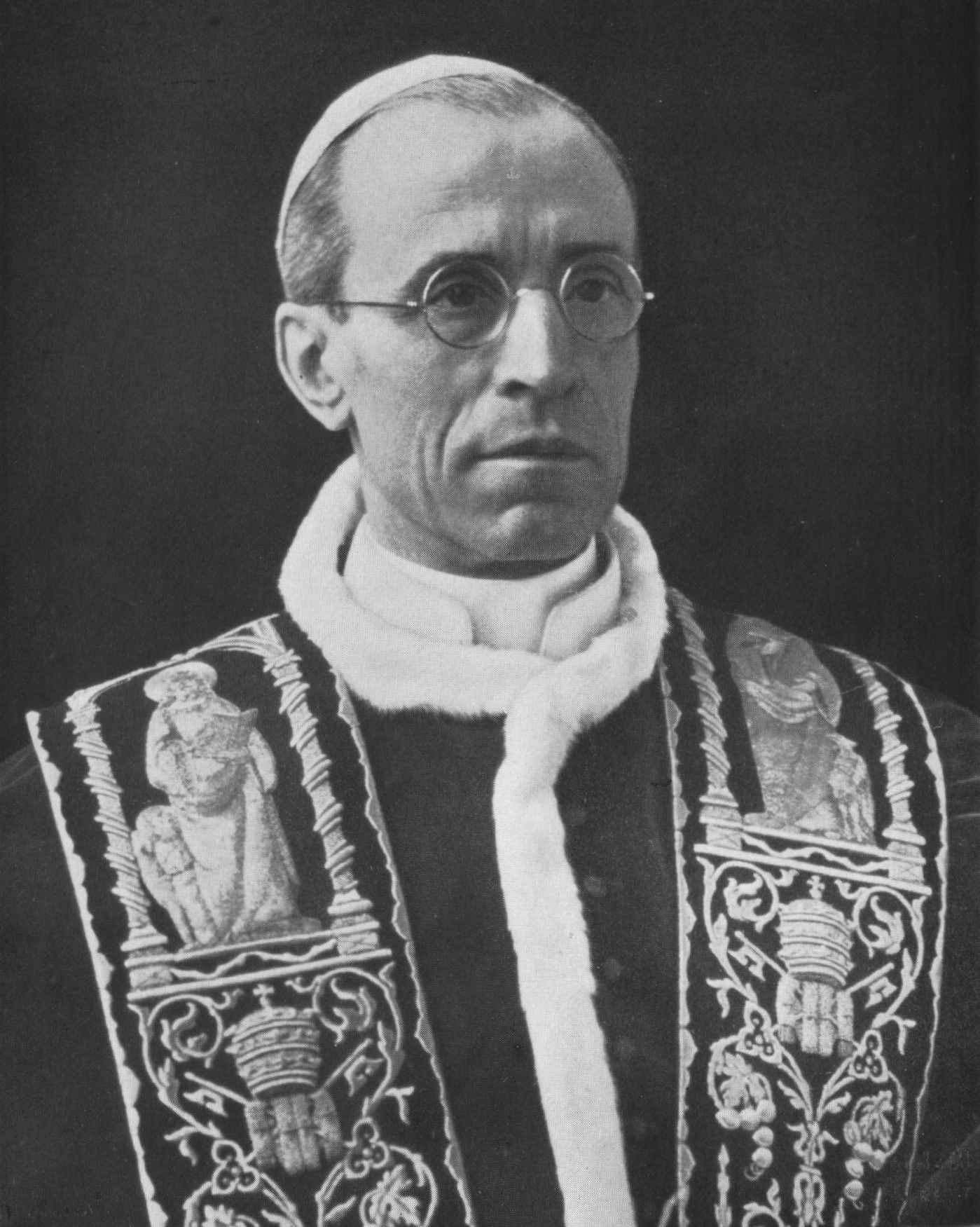
Pope Pius XII

Several authors have alleged that there was a plot to kidnap Pope Pius XII by the Nazis when they occupied Rome during World War II. Karl Wolff, a general in the Schutzstaffel, stated that he had been ordered on 13 September 1943 to kidnap the Pope.

== Accounts by former SS and Wehrmacht commanders ==
In the early 1970s Karl Wolff, former Supreme SS and Police Leader in Italy, promoted the theory of an alleged plot. Most other allegations of such a plot are based on a 1972 document written by Wolff that Avvenire d'Italia published in 1991, and on personal interviews with Wolff before his death in 1984. Wolff maintained that on 13 September 1943 Adolf Hitler gave the directive to "occupy Vatican City, secure its files and art treasures, and take the Pope and Curia to the north". Hitler allegedly did not want the Pope to "fall into the hands of the Allies". Wolff's reliability has been questioned by historians of the Holocaust such as István Deák, a professor of history at Columbia University. Reviewing A Special Mission by Dan Kurzman, a promoter of the theory, Deák noted Kurzman's "credulity" and that the latter "uncritically accepts the validity of controversial documents and unquestioningly believes in the statements made to him by his principal German interlocutor, the former SS General Karl Wolff". He further criticized the book's "modest documentation" containing "a great number of vague or inaccurate references".

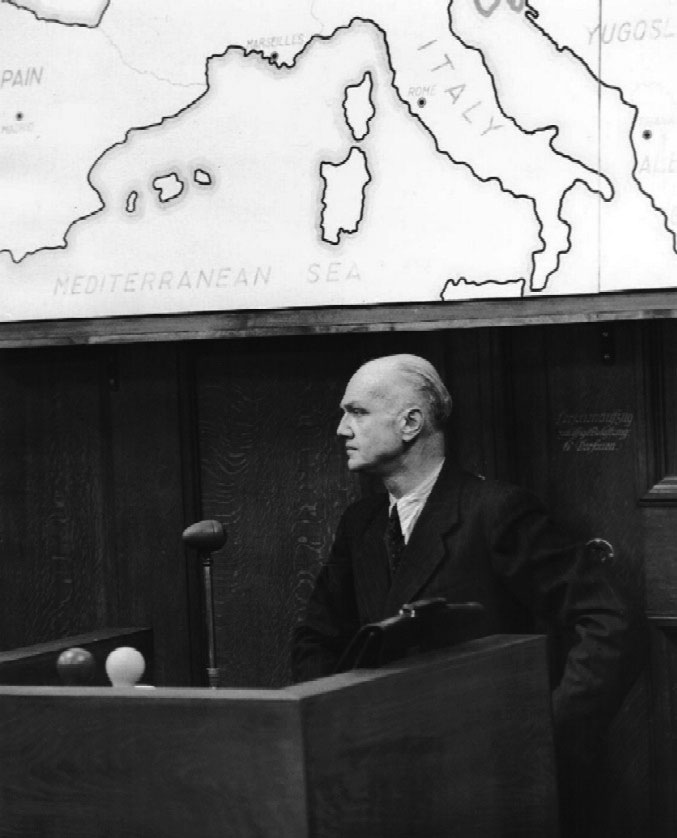
Erwin von Lahousen testifying during the Nuremberg trials

The former Generalmajor Erwin von Lahousen, in his deposition at the Nuremberg Trials on 1 February 1946 (Warnreise Testimony 1330-1430), said that Hitler had ordered the Reich Security Main Office to devise a plot to punish the Italian people by kidnapping or murdering Pius XII and Victor Emmanuel III, the King of Italy. But, Lahousen said, Admiral Wilhelm Canaris, head of the German counterintelligence service, informed his Italian counterpart, General Cesare Amè, during a secret meeting in Venice on July 29–30, 1943. Lahousen and Colonel Wessel Freytag von Loringhoven were also present at this meeting. According to Lahousen, Amè apparently spread the news and the plot was dropped.

Rudolf Rahn, the German Plenipotentiary to the Italian Social Republic (RSI), sent a letter to Robert A. Graham (one of the editors of the ADSS) in the 1970s, which was published by the Italian magazine 30 Giorni in 1991, stating that such a plot existed but that all documents relating to it had been destroyed or lost; Rahn died in 1975.

== Sources alleging a plot ==
=== John Cornwell ===
John Cornwell's Hitler's Pope (1999) subscribes to the existence of such a plot. The only source that Cornwell's account cites is "Teste manuscript, 822ff, in the keeping of the Jesuit Curia at the Borgo Santo Spirito in Rome." Cornwell's version centres on Wolff, but—unlike the account of other secondary authors—does not claim that the matter was not to be put in writing; in fact, Cornwell claims that Wolff "sent in about six to eight personnel reports." As with Wolff's own account, Cornwell casts Wolff as the hero, whose "purpose" was to "impede the deportation of the Pope." According to Cornwell, Wolff was able to persuade Hitler to drop the plan. In Cornwell's view: "all the facts indicate, therefore, that an attempt to invade the Vatican and its properties, or to seize the Pope in response to a papal protest would have seriously hindered the Nazi war effort. And thus even Hitler came to acknowledge what Pacelli appeared to ignore: that the strongest social and political force in Italy in the autumn of 1943 was the Catholic Church, and that its scope for noncompliance with disruption was immense."

The historical value of Cornwell's Hitler's Pope has been questioned in regards to his treatment of the Pope by many other authors. Kenneth L. Woodward wrote that "Errors of fact and ignorance of context appear on almost every page." Peter Gumpel, an expert in the wartime period of Pope Pius XII's papacy, published a point-by-point rebuttal, including pointing out that "Before publication of the book ["Hitler's Pope"], an article appeared in the Sunday Times, in which Cornwell (who has no academic degrees in history, law, or theology) said he was the first and only person ever to be granted permission to visit the archive of the Vatican secretariat of state, had worked there for months on end, and discovered an unknown and highly compromising letter written by Pacelli on 18 April 1917, which, according to him, had lain there hidden as a time-bomb. All these statements are false and were declared as such in an official and authoritative statement issued by the Vatican in l'Osservatore Romano on October 13." Another scholar who addressed Cornwell's publication was Professor Ronald Rychlak, with his book Hitler, the War, and the Pope (2010). Rabbi David G. Dalin wrote The Myth of Hitler's Pope, and with Joseph Bottum co-edited The Pius War: Responses to the Critics of Pius XII.

=== Dan Kurzman ===
Dan Kurzman, a former foreign correspondent for The Washington Post, maintains in A Special Mission: Hitler's Secret Plot to Seize the Vatican and Kidnap Pope Pius XII (2007) that the planned kidnapping was real and that the interviews he conducted "leave little doubt that the plot was serious". Kurzman's book has received attention from Catholic and other Christian news sources and advocacy organizations.

Kurzman acknowledges that there are no official German documents that refer to the plot, claiming that Hitler prohibited the plot to be put in writing, and bases his book on personal interviews with Germans and Vatican officials. Kurzman's principal source is Wolff, after his release from Allied custody; Kurzman acknowledges that Wolff was demonstrably untruthful in many aspects of his testimony. Kurzman's other interviewees include: Rudolph Rahn, German ambassador to the RSI, Eitel Mollhausen, Rahn's deputy, Albrecht von Kessel, the deputy of Ernst von Weizsäcker, SS Colonel Eugen Dollman, Wolff's liaison to Field Marshal Albert Kesselring, and Peter Gumpel, the Vatican's advocate for canonization of Pius XII. Gumpel has claimed that Pius XII made plans to resign in the event of his kidnapping.

== Sources denying a plot ==
=== Owen Chadwick ===
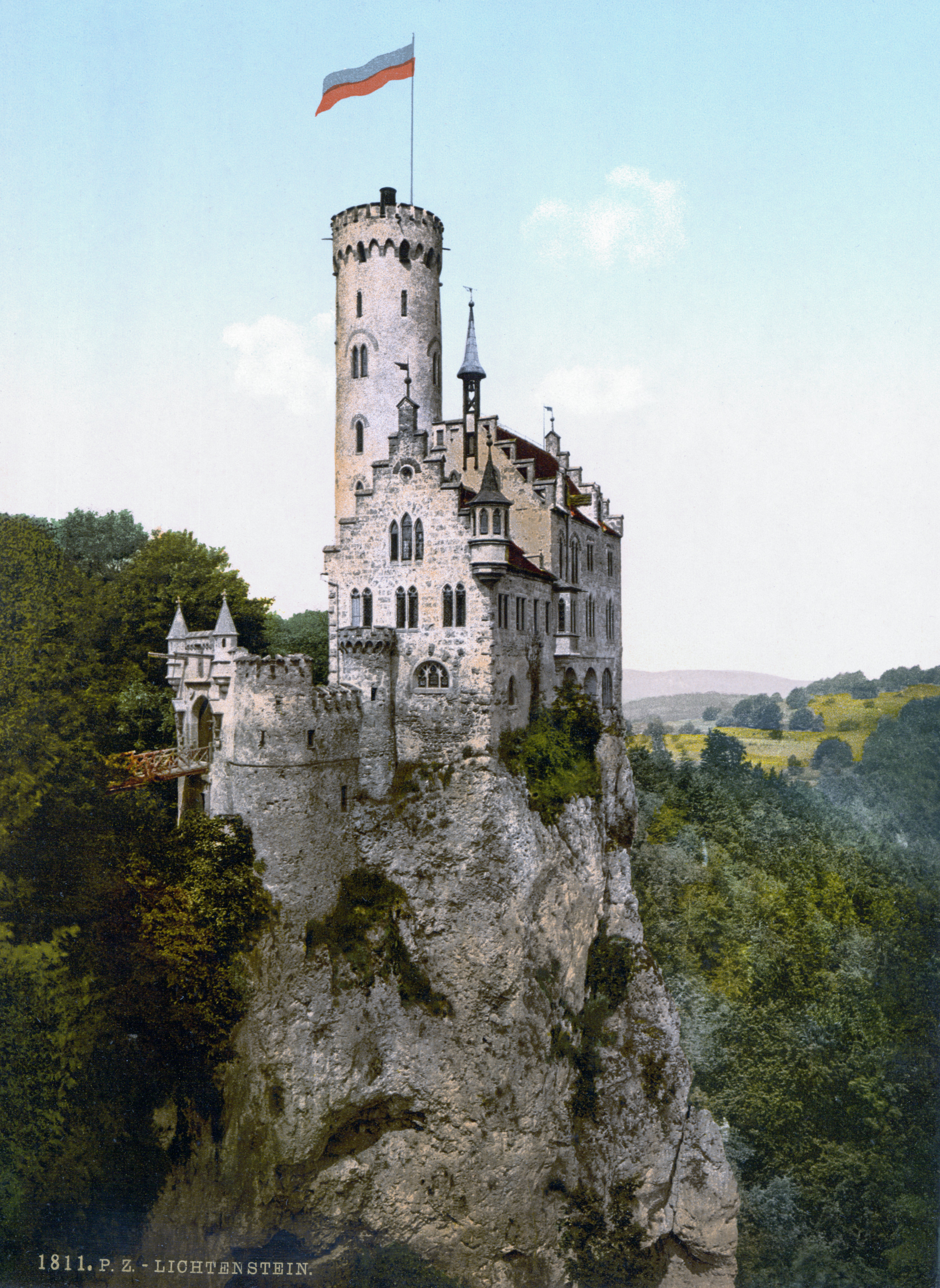
British propagandists falsified transmissions claiming that the pope was to be imprisoned in Lichtenstein Castle.

Owen Chadwick, a professor of history at the University of Cambridge, having studied the papers of D'Arcy Osborne, the British ambassador to the Vatican during the war, argued that the British Political Warfare Executive (PWE) "found it excellent propaganda to put it about that Hitler was just about to kidnap the Pope". The British propaganda office fabricated at least two German wireless broadcasts in support of the theory, building upon a pre-existing "rumour". First, on 9 October 1943 the British released a fake German broadcast claiming that all preparations had been made for such a kidnapping. Then, two days later, another falsified transmission stated that the Lichtenstein Castle in Württemberg was ready to imprison the Pope and cardinals.

Osborne himself considered the odds of such a kidnapping incredibly unlikely, as the Pope's presence in the Vatican prevented the British from bombing the key communications center of the German army in Southern Italy, which was adjacent. Weizsäcker, the German ambassador, had already ensured that the Vatican itself would not be occupied by the Germans when they occupied Rome after the collapse of Mussolini's government.

=== Alvarez and Graham ===
David Alvarez and Robert A. Graham, one of the Jesuit priest-historians chosen by Pope Paul VI to edit the ADSS, concur with Chadwick, concluding that "the evidence concerning an alleged plot to kidnap the pope is, at best, mixed". Noting that such a kidnapping would have outraged Catholics around the world and seriously destabilized the Third Reich's occupation of majority Catholic nations, Alvarez and Graham argue that Allied propagandists "did not shrink from the opportunity" to claim such a plot.

Alvarez and Graham cite the PWE fabrications mentioned by Chadwick, but also prior PWE propaganda pieces featuring various claims about the Pope contemplating abandoning the Vatican due to Axis threats. Although such rumors were picked up even by German diplomats, Alvarez and Graham conclude that "the clearest evidentiary trail in the tangle of rumor, memory and fiction that surrounds the purported plot to kidnap the Pope is the one that leads back to London instead of Berlin". Alvarez and Graham go further in indicting the scholarship of those claiming a plot:

Historians have yet to uncover a single piece of contemporary evidence indicating that Hitler, Himmler, Bormann, or any other authority had any serious intention, let alone plan, to invade Vatican City and carry out Pope Pius XII. As for all the smoke, the recollections are post-war and suspiciously self-serving; the rumors and warnings second- and third-hand; the alleged plans and concentration of forces undocumented. The few bits of credible evidence that do exist suggest that, in fact, there was no plan to move against the Pope.
