= Crucifix Decrees =

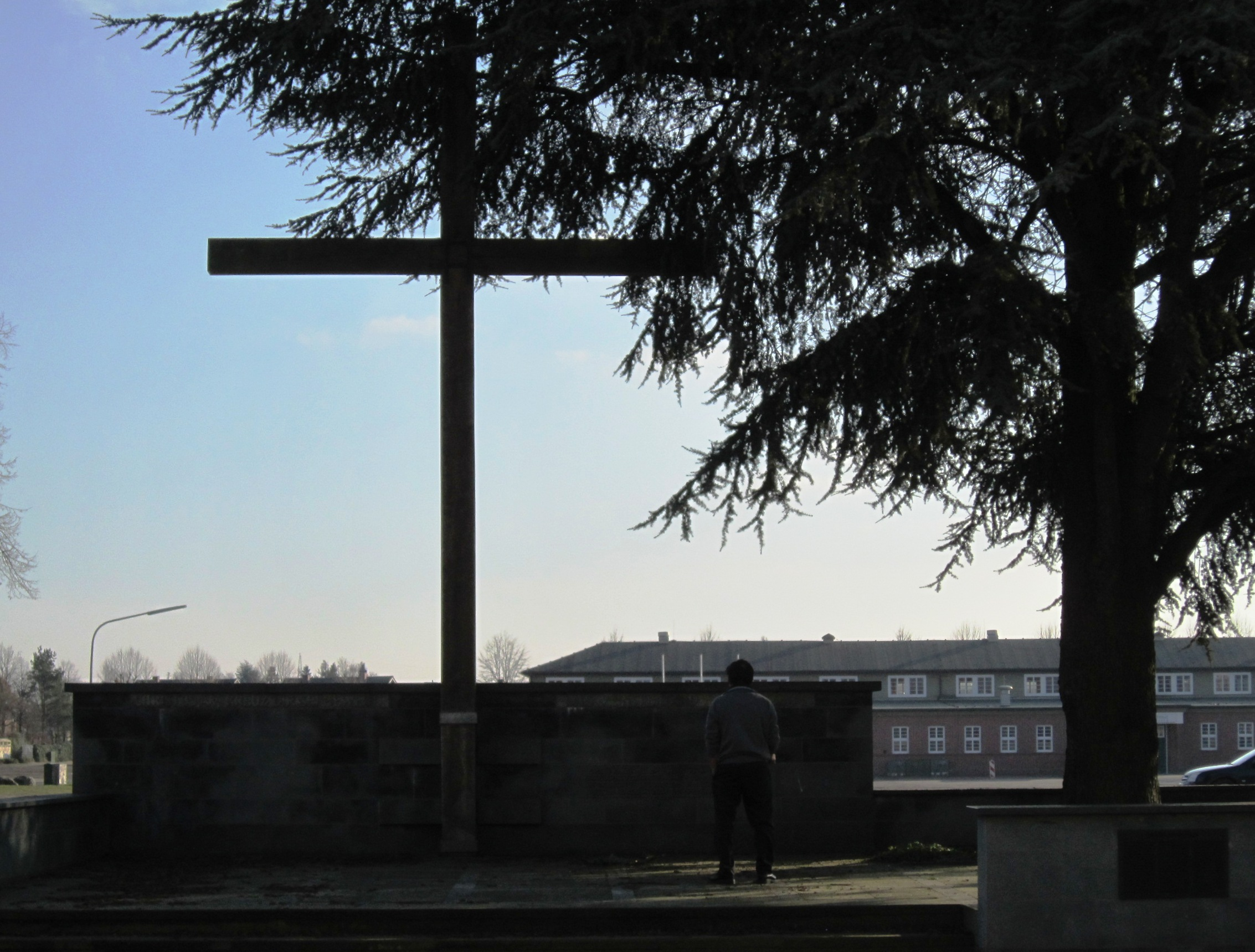
"Kreuzkampf" ("Battle for the cross") Memorial in Cloppenburg (Lower Saxony)

The Crucifix Decrees (Crucifix Struggle) were part of the Nazi Regime's efforts to secularize public life. For example, crucifixes throughout public places like schools were to be replaced with the Führer's picture. The Crucifix Decrees throughout the years of 1935 to 1941 sparked protests against removing crucifixes from traditional places. Protests notably occurred in Oldenburg (Lower Saxony) in 1936, Frankenholz (Saarland) and Frauenberg (East Prussia) in 1937, and in Bavaria in 1941. These incidents prompted Nazi party leaders to back away from crucifix removals in 1941.

== Historical significance ==
Significance within the Crucifix Decrees lies within the single-issue based event that it was. The following list are some of the events related to the Crucifix Decrees:

- From 1935 to 1941, there were many cars blowing horns, church bells ringing in order to produce a general sense of disruption.
- Many mothers visited delegation meetings and threatened to remove their children from school.
- Women sent their children to school wearing necklaces featuring crucifixes.
- In 1935, a group of men pushed their way into a school to replace Hitler's picture with a crucifix.
- The Bavarian Government Presidents expressed concern about the interference of Holy days and the morale of the Catholic population in August 1937.
- In Upper Franconia women wrote letters to their husbands on the war fronts to tell them what was going on at home in order to show how the war and home fronts were not on the same page.

However, another significant note is how there were different reactions to the crucifix decrees on Nazi leaders' sides. For example, in Cloppenburg during 1936 a Gauleiter speech the crowd expected him to rescind the crucifix decrees, but he began his speech on racial problems in Africa. Another example occurred in the district of Ebergs where not a single crucifix was removed from the start. These examples show how single issues ranged among Nazi officials' levels of strictness.

One German term "Handlungsspielraum" is the collective opinion being expressed in a way that the regime has to respond to. This term signifies that organized protest, like those in the Crucifix Decrees among others, forces the regime to take notice and possible action.

Furthermore, these events were part of Gleichschaltung on a larger note because of the all-encompassing mentality of the regime. This was a sign that the regime was taking a step into religion, yet not completely voluntarily on the citizens' side.

It is worthy of note that in 1937, according to Alfred Rosenberg, Hitler affirmed his continued support for the ongoing Crucifix Decrees by dismissing complaints made about it by Hanns Kerrl.

== Role of women ==
The regime saw noteworthy public protests by primarily Catholics, like those resulting from the Crucifix Decrees, and women. Public protest in the war increased as each event was single-issue based. During wartime, with more women on the home-front there were more issues that became oppressive and therefore women found this as a "source of complaint". For example, the Rosenstrasse Protest and the Witten Women's Protest were two reactions against specific actions: the Rosenstrasse Protest being one event and the Witten Women's Protest being a string of events.
