= Political officer =

Political officer may refer to:

- Political commissar
- Official of the Indian Political Department of the British Empire
- Political Officer, one of five tracks for Foreign Service officers in the United States Department of State
- "The Political Officer", a story by Charles Coleman Finlay
