= Witten Women's Protest =

1943 Nazi protest

The Witten Women's Protest was conducted to demonstrate against a specific policy of the Nazi regime. After being evacuated from the city of Witten due to the dangers of Allied bombing raids, women and children were moved to the countryside in Baden, away from their husbands and homes. Many women returned to Witten and their homes despite these regulations. By traveling back and forth between their homes and evacuation sites, they were seen by the Nazi government to be an additional burden on already over-stressed wartime transportation systems. The Nazi Party Gauleiter (regional Party Leader) of Westphalia South, Albert Hoffmann, declared that women from his region would not receive their food ration cards except in Baden or other designated evacuation sites. The protest occurred on October 11, 1943 and achieved the aims of the protesters, backed by a ruling by Hitler in January 1944, to allow the distribution of ration cards regardless of where the women were. According to the SD secret police there were estimated to be 300 women in the Witten Women's Protest. The Witten Women's Protest and the Nazi appeasement of the protesters prompted Goebbels to worry on November 2, 1943 that the regime was losing power by giving in repeatedly to Germans gathered on the streets in dissent. The protest weighed decisively on Hitler's decision in January 1944, that no Nazi official could manipulate ration card distribution as means of enforcing evacuation regulations.

== Background ==
By autumn of 1943, three million civilians had been evacuated from their homes and relocated to different areas of Germany that the Allied forces had a harder time bombing. As Allied bombing intensified, some civilians evacuated out of concern for their own safety; others, like women and children, were relocated by the Nazi Government. Relatively new evacuation rules established the previous spring discontinued the practice of Freizügigkeit, in which civilians were able to pay their own way and evacuate anywhere they chose to- with the end of this practice, a flood of evacuees began to pour into similar government assigned areas, causing problems for cities as civilians with different dialects, customs, and religions moved into one shared space. As new neighbors clashed and winter came, people were ready to return home. In attempts to stop them, the Reich tried several methods of preventive measures- closing schools, restricting train ticket sales to those with explicit permission to leave the area, and then restricting access to ration cards unless evacuees stayed in their evacuation area.

== Events ==
In a November 1943 report on current events and their effect on women's mood, the Nazi secret police (security service, SD) made a detailed report to the Third Reich's highest authorities, stating that on 11 October 1943 about 300 women had demonstrated in front of city hall in Witten in order to take a public position against official measures. According to the SS, the women gathered on Adolf Hitler Square in the Ruhr-area city of Witten to protest against an official decision by the regional party leader (Gauleiter) to withhold their food ration cards until they moved from their homes in the city to evacuation sites in the Baden countryside. The women became more outraged when they discovered that not every area had adopted this policy, and that their neighbors moving back home from their evacuation area were able to receive their rations stamps.

The Security Service, Nazi Police, or SD, reported:

The women in question had indeed tried to force the delivery of food ration cards, in order to take a public stand against the measures that led to this prohibition of the delivery of food ration cards. Shameful scenes developed so that the city administration of Witten found itself forced to call on the police so as to restore order. They refused to get involved however since the demands of the women were fair and there was no legal basis for not handing out food ration cards to German people who had returned [home]. Also in Hamm, Lünen, and Bochum wild scenes reportedly played out in front of the food offices. Agitated crowds of people waited in line for the distribution [of rations]. Because some of the women brought with them small children and nursing infants and the miners in some cases showed up in the place of their wives, those waiting began to exchange accounts of their experiences in the places they had been evacuated to, and the craziest (tollste) statements were made. Miners declared that they would not return to the mines before they had received the necessary food ration cards for their families. Women announced that they would rather suffer bombs here than to once again return to the quarters assigned to them. The publication in the newspaper as well as at the distribution center on October 12, 1943 that food ration cards would not only be denied to those who had returned but also to all children required to attend school, even if they had not yet been evacuated, led to a firsthand rebellion among the women, who had been capable of anything, without exercise of the least restraint or caution about consequences. Friendly persuasion had the opposite effect. Insults of official and high-ranking persons were the order of the day.

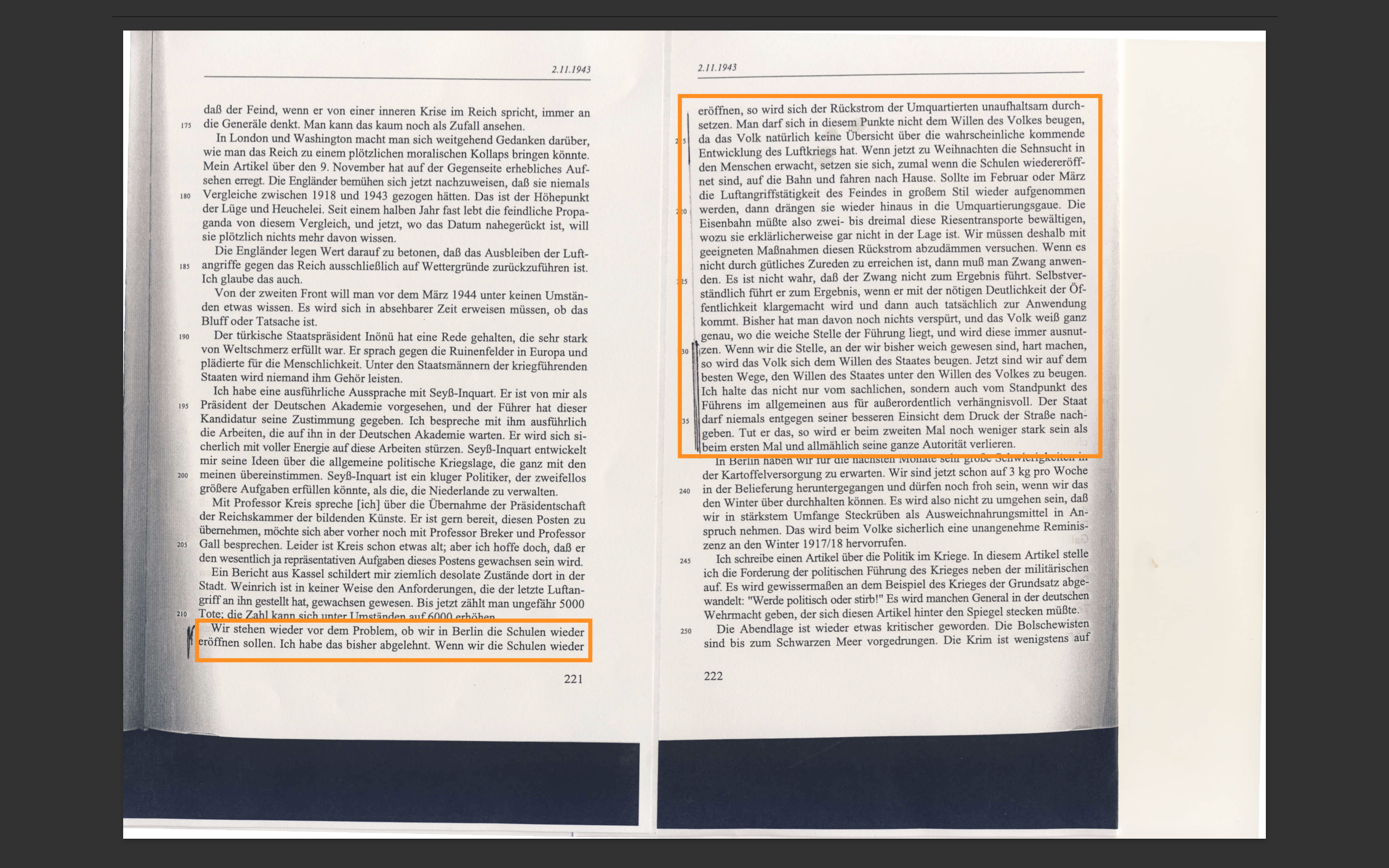
Goebbels Diary Excerpt November 2, 1943

According to the SD, demonstrations like the one at Witten had taken place in front of municipal food offices in nearby Hamm, Lünen and Bochum in the same period.

By 1943, as British and American bombing raids continued to increase in intensity, Hitler wished to evacuate all civilians from targeted cities not essential to the war production industries by most means necessary. Within these strictures, Gauleiters were free to develop a range of tactics for evacuating Germans from targeted cities and preventing them from returning home. In Witten the women protested the regional party leader's decision to deny ration cards to evacuees who returned to their homes in cities subject to bombing raids. At the same time, he insisted that civilians must volunteer for evacuations rather than being forced into them- within four months of the protests in Witten, Hitler responded with policy that allowed more women and children to both return to their homes and received ration cards. The regime also improved opportunities for working fathers to go visit evacuated family members to promote cooperation in evacuation.

== Significance ==
The Witten protest appears to have been the fulcrum event that forced a conclusion for Hitler in January 1944, that Gauleiters must not withhold ration cards as a means to force evacuees to remain in their assigned quarters away from their homes. The Führer then maintained this position at least through October 1944, as the German situation both at home and in the war became increasingly calamitous. Propaganda Minister and Hitler confidant Joseph Goebbels mused in his diary on November 2, 1943, that repeated concessions to protesters could cost the regime authority in the eyes of the German people.

We must try, ... through appropriate measures, to dam this flood of returning evacuees. If this is not achievable through well-meaning persuasion, then coercion must be used. It is not true that coercion does not lead to the desired result. ... Nothing has been felt of this [coercion] yet, and the Volk knows perfectly well where the pliant spot of the leadership is, and will always know how to exploit it. If we harden the spot where we have thus far been pliable, the Volk will bend to the will of the State. At the moment we are on the way to bending the will of the State under to the will of the Volk ... The state must never, against its own best interests, give way to the pressure of the street. If it does this, it will be even weaker the second time than the first, and gradually lose its whole authority.

Using a broader interpretation of the meaning and history behind the Witten Protest is Richard Evans who wrote in 1976 on the context within women's history of protesting. He writes that popular resistance enacted Hitler to back down in response to this protest. "The regime gave in to the women's protests," because it feared that "open resistance might have become very difficult to suppress without alienating not only the general populace but also the soldiers at the front." He explained that Nazi authorities feared the "rulebreaking" of women more than men and "kept a particularly close watch on the morale of women during the war." Further, Women could be much more easily provoked into open resistance than men." He further explains that there are "common features" within the Nazi Party of "almost total neglect of the larger part of the population— the female part ... Yet no explanation of any feature of German social history— least of all the rise of Hitler— that leaves out of consideration the larger part of the population can be considered adequate; and there are now [1976], at last signs that the realization of this fact is starting to make an impact at least on historians in Britain and the United States, though it has still to find widespread acceptance in Germany." However, in his 2008 work, he ignored the scholarship that backed up his 1976 conclusion, stating that "...the threat of arrest, prosecution and incarceration in increasingly brutal and violent conditions loomed over every one in the Third Reich. . . . The regime intimidated Germans into acquiescence, visiting a whole range of sanctions upon those who dared to oppose it.”.

Many Historians have concluded that the Witten street protests succeeded in getting their way by protesting. The regime preferred to accommodate rather than punish them because suppressing open resistance would likely alienate the people it depended on to win the war, whether on the home front or the battle front. The early treatments by historians saw the protest as an indication of women's resistance or of workers' opposition. More recently historians have set the Witten Demonstration within the context of civilian evacuations and have found the motivation for protest in the bonds of family.
