= Robert A. Graham =

American Jesuit priest and historian

Robert Andrew Graham, SJ (March 11, 1912 – February 11, 1997) was an American Jesuit priest and World War II historian of the Catholic Church. He was a vigorous defender of Pope Pius XII against accusations that he had failed to do what he could to defend the Jews and others persecuted by the Nazis.

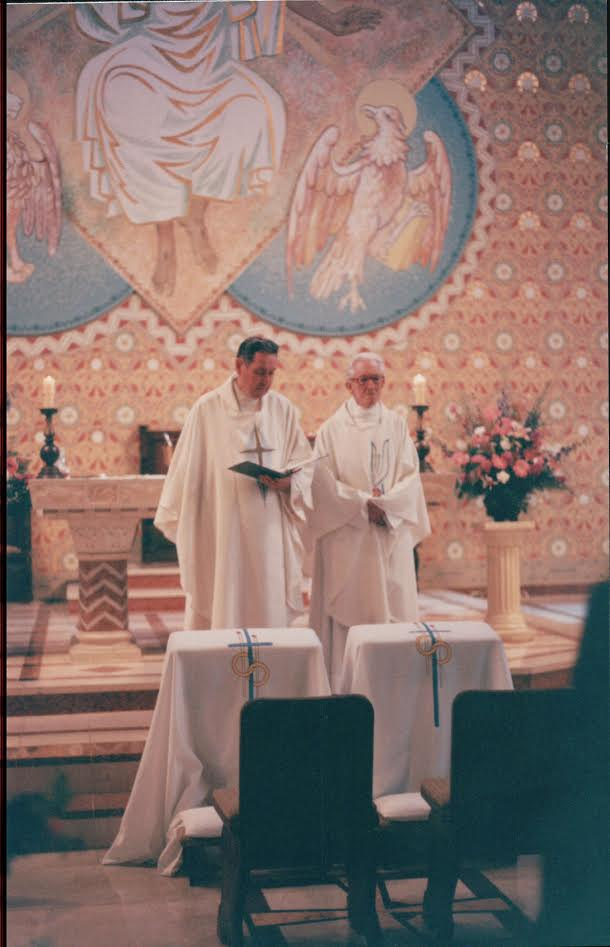
Robert A. Graham (right) at wedding in Annunciation Church in Washington, DC, July 1992

== Biography ==
Graham was born on March 11, 1912, in Sacramento, California, the son of Charlie Graham, a former professional baseball player for the Boston Red Sox and part owner of the San Francisco Seals, Graham joined the California province of the Jesuits as a young man. He was ordained a priest in 1941 and was soon sent to New York City to work on the Jesuit weekly America, where he remained for two decades. Taking a sabbatical, in 1952, he earned a doctorate in political science and international law from the Graduate Institute of International Studies in Geneva.

In 1959, his book, Vatican Diplomacy: A Study of Church and State on the International Plane, was published.

To counter growing attacks, in 1965 the Vatican began publication of some of its wartime documents in a series of books edited by a Jesuit team, Actes et Documents du Saint Siège relatifs à la Seconde Guerre mondiale. Graham joined them in Rome in 1966 and worked on volume three of what grew to eleven by the project's completion in 1981. In 1968, Graham published a book, The Pope and Poland in World War II, a summary of Volume III of the Actes, which deals with the Church in Poland.

Graham often published the findings of his research in La Civiltà Cattolica, the Jesuit-run, Catholic journal in Italy. In 1996, Graham published English translations of some of his La Civilta Cattolica articles in his book, The Vatican and Communism During World War: What Really Happened.

Graham often wrote a column for Columbia, the official magazine of the Knights of Columbus.

In matters regarding Pius XII, he worked with Raimondo Spiazzi. The New York Times quoted Graham: "I am 79, I thought I ought to unload this stuff, before I pop off". Graham remained in Rome until illness struck in 1996, when he returned to his native California. He died in Los Gatos, California, on February 11, 1997, aged 84, leaving behind a large body of published and unpublished work.

== Publications ==
- Alvarez, David and Graham, Robert A., Nothing Sacred: Nazi Espionage Against the Vatican, 1939-1945, Routledge, 1997
- Graham, Robert A, The Vatican and Communism during World War II, What Really Happened, Ignatius Press, 1996
- Graham. Robert A., The Pope in Poland in World War Two, Veritas, 1968
- Graham, Robert A., Vatican Diplomacy: A Study of Church & State on the International Plane, Princeton University Press, 1959
