= Actes et documents du Saint Siège relatifs à la Seconde Guerre Mondiale =

The eleven volumes of the ADSS

Actes et Documents du Saint Siège relatifs à la Seconde Guerre Mondiale (French for Acts and Documents of the Holy See related to the Second World War), often abbreviated Actes or ADSS, is an eleven-volume collection of documents from the Vatican historical archives, related to the papacy of Pope Pius XII during World War II.

The collection was compiled by four Jesuit priest-historians—Pierre Blet (France), Angelo Martini (Italy), Burkhart Schneider (Germany), and Robert A. Graham (United States)—authorized by Pope Paul VI in 1964, and published between 1965 and 1981.

The remainder of the documents from Pius XII's papacy were finally released almost forty years later by order of Pope Francis on March 2, 2020. The completed catalog includes approximately 16 million documents from Pius XII's papacy (1939-1958), divided into approximately 700 boxes related to the Cardinal Secretary of State and the various nunciatures. According to Catholic sources, "The delays were largely due to the extensive cataloguing required."

== Origins ==
The collection is a rare exception to the Vatican's de facto seventy-five year rule for opening its archives, published in the aftermath of the controversial play, The Deputy, by Rolf Hochhuth. The collection was intended to answer critics of Pius XII, such as Hochhuth, who alleged that the Pope had turned a blind eye to Nazi atrocities against Jews. In particular, the editors presented a variety of documents which they claim demonstrate how Pope Pius XII protested the persecution of and various deportations of Jews.

== Organization ==
Five of the eleven volumes deal with World War II, in chronological order. Four volumes deal with the humanitarian activities of the Holy See during the war, also in chronological order. One covers Pope Pius XII's letters to German bishops before and during the war. The last encompasses documents pertaining to Poland and Baltic countries.

In the Actes, none of the documents—mostly in Italian—were translated from their original language. The introductions to the volumes and the brief descriptions preceding the documents are in French. Because the third volume contains two books, the ADSS are sometimes incorrectly referred to as a twelve-volume collection.

== Inclusions and omissions ==
The editors describe the selected documents as a representative sample of Vatican activity during World War II; the four Jesuits claimed that only size constraints prevented them from publishing the full set of documents and that no new important revelations would accompany the eventual complete publication.

According to the count of Australian historian Paul O'Shea, the ADSS contains 107 references to Jews prior to December 1942, and substantially more thereafter; a variety of other studies have extensively listed the data received by the Vatican on the nature and extent of the atrocities throughout Europe, as can be confirmed by the ADSS.

In his article for the Vatican newspaper, L'Osservatore Romano (April 29, 1998), Father Pierre Blet, the last surviving editor of the series, defended the integrity of the collection. "In the first place, it is not clear exactly how the omission of certain documents would help to exonerate Pius XII from the omissions alleged against him," Blet wrote. "On the other hand, to say in peremptory tones that our publication is incomplete is tantamount to asserting what cannot be proved: to this end it would be necessary to compare our publication with the archives and show which documents in the archives are missing from our publication." Blet added that he and three other Jesuits "did not deliberately overlook any significant document, because we would have considered it harmful to the Pope's image and the Holy See's reputation."

== The editors ==
The four Jesuit editors also wrote many articles derived from these primary sources, most of which were published in La Civiltà Cattolica, an Italian-language Jesuit journal.

=== Blet ===
Blet's Pius XII and the Second World War : According to the Archives of the Vatican (1999) represents his interpretation of what essential conclusions can be drawn from the eleven volume collection.

=== Graham ===
Robert A. Graham's research did not stop with the publication of the ADSS; he continued to seek out primary sources within and without the Vatican and interview contemporaries almost until his death. He retired to California, taking his considerable body of records with him; this collection was made open to the public (although rarely actually used) until his death, at which point the Vatican had all the papers returned to Rome and sealed.

== Translations ==
As of 2002, only one of the volumes had been translated into English. In 2012, Marilyn Mallory published an English translation of some of the documents.
