= Soviet disinformation =

Political warfare technique of the Soviet Union

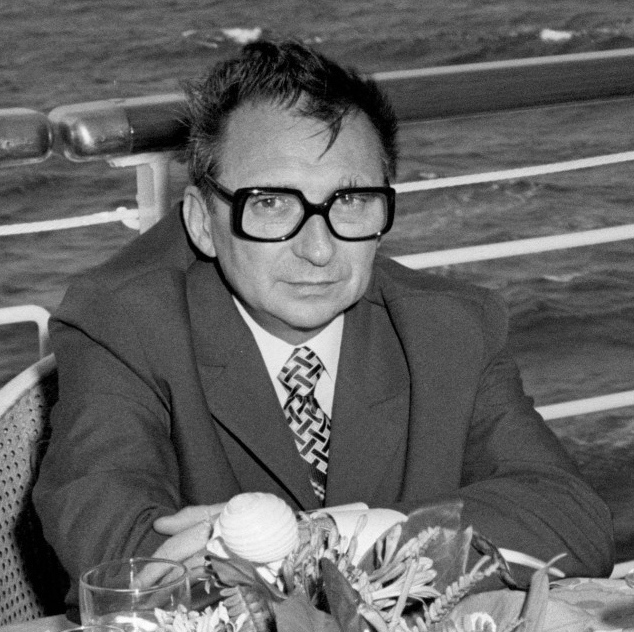
Former Romanian secret police senior official Ion Mihai Pacepa exposed disinformation history in his book Disinformation (2013).

Use of disinformation as a Soviet tactical weapon started in 1923, when it became a tactic used in the Soviet political warfare called active measures.

== Development ==
In 1923, when the deputy chairman of the KGB-precursor the State Political Directorate (GPU), Józef Unszlicht, called for the foundation of "a special disinformation office to conduct active intelligence operations". The GPU was the first organization in the Soviet Union to use the term disinformation for their intelligence tactics. William Safire wrote in his 1993 book, Quoth the Maven, that disinformation was used by the KGB predecessor to indicate: "manipulation of a nation's intelligence system through the injection of credible, but misleading data". Defector Ion Mihai Pacepa claimed Joseph Stalin coined the term, giving it a French-sounding name to claim it had a Western origin. Russian use began with a "special disinformation office" in 1923. Disinformation was defined in the Great Soviet Encyclopedia (1952) as "false information with the intention to deceive public opinion".

From this point on, disinformation became a tactic used in the Soviet political warfare called active measures. Active measures were a crucial part of Soviet intelligence strategy involving forgery as covert operation, subversion, and media manipulation. The 2003 encyclopedia Propaganda and Mass Persuasion states that disinformation came from dezinformatsia, a term used by the Russian black propaganda unit known as Service A that referred to active measures. The term was used in 1939, related to a "German Disinformation Service". The 1991 edition of The Merriam-Webster New Book of Word Histories defines disinformation as a probable translation of the Russian dezinformatsiya. This dictionary notes that it was possible the English version of the word and the Russian-language version developed independently in parallel to each other—out of ongoing frustration related to the spread of propaganda before World War II.

Ion Mihai Pacepa, former senior official from the Romanian secret police, said the word was coined by Joseph Stalin and used during World War II. The Stalinist government then used disinformation tactics in both World War II and the Cold War. Soviet intelligence used the term maskirovka (Russian military deception) to refer to a combination of tactics including disinformation, simulation, camouflage, and concealment. Pacepa and Ronald J. Rychlak authored a book entitled Disinformation, in which Pacepa wrote that Stalin gave the tactic a French-sounding title in order to put forth the ruse that it was a technique used by the Western world. Pacepa recounted reading Soviet instruction manuals while working as an intelligence officer, that characterized disinformation as a strategy used by the Russian government that had early origins in Russian history. Pacepa recalled that the Soviet manuals said the origins of disinformation stemmed from phony towns constructed by Grigory Potyomkin in Crimea to wow Catherine the Great during her 1783 journey to the region—subsequently referred to as Potemkin villages.

In their book Propaganda and Persuasion, authors Garth Jowett and Victoria O'Donnell characterized disinformation as a cognate from dezinformatsia, and was developed from the same name given to a KGB black propaganda department. The black propaganda division was reported to have formed in 1955 and was referred to as the Dezinformatsiya agency. Former Central Intelligence Agency (CIA) director William Colby explained how the Dezinformatsiya agency operated, saying that it would place a false article in a left-leaning newspaper. The fraudulent tale would make its way to a communist periodical, before eventually being published by a Soviet newspaper, which would say its sources were undisclosed individuals. By this process a falsehood was globally proliferated as a legitimate piece of reporting.

The term disinformation began to see wider use as a form of Soviet tradecraft, defined in the 1952 official Great Soviet Encyclopedia as "the dissemination (in the press, radio, etc.) of false information with the intention to deceive public opinion." During the most-active period of the Cold War, from 1945 to 1989, the tactic was used by multiple intelligence agencies including the Soviet KGB, British Secret Intelligence Service, and the American CIA.

The word disinformation saw increased usage in the 1960s and wider purveyance by the 1980s. Operation INFEKTION was a Soviet disinformation campaign to influence opinion that the U.S. invented AIDS. The U.S. did not actively counter disinformation until 1980, when a fake document reported that the U.S. supported apartheid. A major disinformation effort in 1964, Operation Neptune, was designed by the Czechoslovak secret service, the StB, to defame West European politicians as former Nazi collaborators. Former Soviet bloc intelligence officer Ladislav Bittman, the first disinformation practitioner to publicly defect to the West, described the official definition as different from the practice: "The interpretation is slightly distorted because public opinion is only one of the potential targets. Many disinformation games are designed only to manipulate the decision-making elite, and receive no publicity." Bittman was deputy chief of the Disinformation Department of the Czechoslovak Intelligence Service, and testified before the United States Congress on his knowledge of disinformation in 1980.

== Defections reveal covert operations ==
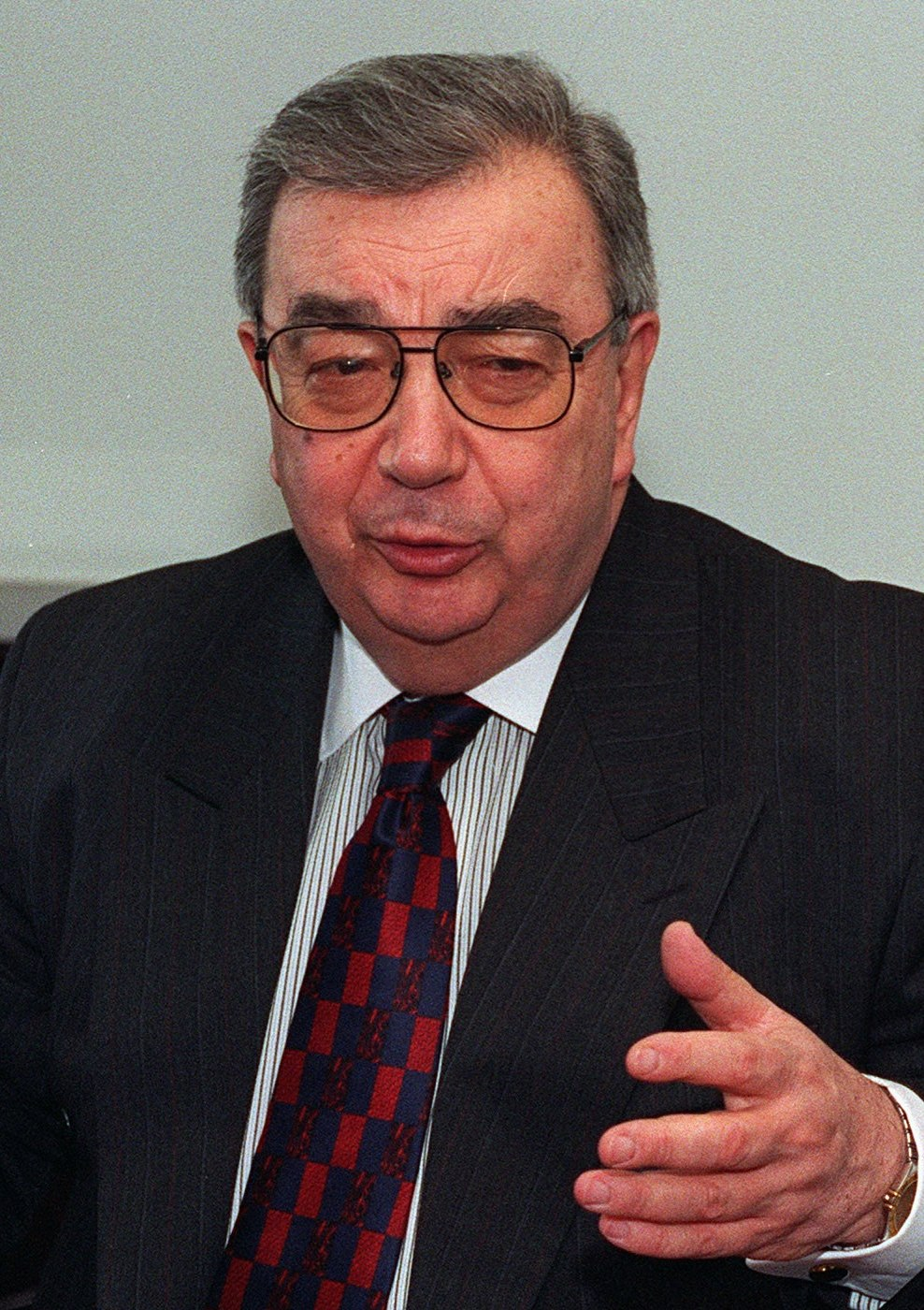
Chief of Russian foreign intelligence Yevgeny Primakov confirmed in 1992 that Operation INFEKTION was a disinformation campaign to make the world believe that the United States had invented AIDS.

The extent of Soviet disinformation covert operation campaigns came to light through the defections of KGB officers and officers of allied Soviet bloc services from the late 1960s to the 1980s. Stanislav Levchenko and Ilya Dzerkvilov were among the Soviet defectors. By 1990, both men had written books recounting their work on disinformation operations for the KGB. Archival documentation revealed in the disorder of the fall of the Soviet Union later confirmed their testimonials.

An early example of successful Soviet disinformation was the 1961 pamphlet, A Study of a Master Spy (Allen Dulles). It was published in the United Kingdom and was highly critical of U.S. CIA director Allen Dulles. The purported authors were given as Independent Labour Party Member of Parliament Bob Edwards and the reporter Kenneth Dunne, but the real author was senior disinformation officer KGB Colonel Vassily Sitnikov. in 1968, the fake Who's Who in the CIA was published, which was quoted as authoritative in the West until the early 1990s.

According to American journalist Max Holland, Soviet archives, particularly those released by Vasili Mitrokhin, "prove that the KGB played a central, pernicious role in fomenting the belief that the CIA was involved in Kennedy's assassination." Among other incidents, Holland stated that the KGB planted a false story in the Italian newspaper Paese Sera alleging that Clay Shaw, whom New Orleans district attorney Jim Garrison indicted in connection with the assassination, was a high-level "CIA operative". The KGB disinformation influenced Garrison's subsequent arguments during the trial of Clay Shaw and was later referenced in Oliver Stone's 1991 film JFK, notwithstanding Shaw's acquittal. Holland writes that "Arguably, [JFK] is the only American feature film made during the Cold War to have, as its very axis, a lie concocted in the KGB's disinformation factories."

According to senior SVR officer Sergei Tretyakov, the KGB had been responsible for creating the entire nuclear winter story as an attempt to stop the deployment of Pershing II missiles. Tretyakov said that in 1979, the KGB started work to prevent the United States from deploying the missiles in Western Europe and that they had been directed by Yuri Andropov to distribute disinformation, based on a faked "doomsday report" by the Soviet Academy of Sciences. The report contained false information on the effect of nuclear war on climate, and was distributed to peace groups, environmentalists, and the journal Ambio: A Journal of the Human Environment.

Deception, Disinformation, and Strategic Communications, cover illustrating propaganda from Operation INFEKTION

During the 1970s, the U.S. intelligence apparatus made little effort to counter Soviet disinformation campaigns. That posture changed during the Carter administration, however, after the White House had been made the subject of a propaganda operation by Soviet intelligence to affect international relations between the U.S. and South Africa. On 17 September 1980, White House Press Secretary Jody Powell acknowledged that a falsified Presidential Review Memorandum on Africa falsely stated that the U.S. had endorsed the apartheid government in South Africa and was actively committed to discrimination against African Americans. Prior to the revelation by Powell, an advance copy of the 18 September 1980 issue of San Francisco-based publication the Sun Reporter had been disseminated, which carried the fake claims. Sun Reporter was published by Carlton Benjamin Goodlett, a Presidential Committee member of a Soviet front group, the World Peace Council. U.S. President Jimmy Carter was appalled at the lies, and his administration then displayed increased interest in the CIA's efforts to counter Soviet disinformation.

In 1982, the CIA issued a report on active measures used by Soviet intelligence. The report documented numerous instances of disinformation campaigns against the U.S., including planting a notion that it had organized the 1979 Grand Mosque seizure, as well as forgery of documents purporting to show the U.S. would use nuclear bombs on its NATO allies.

In 1985, the Soviets launched an elaborate disinformation campaign called Operation INFEKTION to influence global opinion that the U.S. had invented AIDS. The campaign included allegations that the disease had been created as an "ethnic weapon" to destroy non-whites. The head of Russian foreign intelligence, Yevgeny Primakov, admitted the existence of the Operation INFEKTION in 1992.

In 1985, Aldrich Ames gave the KGB a significant amount of information on CIA informants, and the Soviet government swiftly moved to arrest those individuals. Soviet intelligence feared that the rapid action would alert the CIA that Ames was a spy, however. To conceal Ames's duplicity from the CIA, the KGB manufactured disinformation as to the reasoning behind the arrests of the intelligence agents. In the summer of 1985, a KGB officer who was a double agent working for the CIA on a mission in Africa traveled to a dead drop in Moscow on his way home, but never reported in. The CIA heard from a European KGB source that its agent had been arrested. Simultaneously, the FBI and CIA learned from a second KGB source of its agent's arrest. Only after Ames had been outed as a spy for the KGB would it become apparent that the KGB had known all along that both men had been working for the U.S. government, and that Soviet disinformation had been successful in confounding the American intelligence agency.

== See also ==
- Russian disinformation
