= Disinformation (book) =

2013 nonfiction book by Ion Mihai Pacepa and Ronald J. Rychlak

- Disinformation
- Author: Ion Mihai Pacepa and Ronald J. Rychlak
- Original title: Disinformation: Former Spy Chief Reveals Secret Strategies for Undermining Freedom, Attacking Religion, and Promoting Terrorism
- Language: English
- Subject: Disinformation
- Genre: Information warfare
- Publisher: WND Books
- Publication date: 2013
- Publication place: United States
- Media type: Hardcover
- Pages: 429
- ISBN: 978-1-936488-60-5
- OCLC: 926861117
- Preceded by: Red Horizons: The True Story of Nicolae and Elena Ceausescus' Crimes, Lifestyle, and Corruption (1990)

Disinformation: Former Spy Chief Reveals Secret Strategies for Undermining Freedom, Attacking Religion, and Promoting Terrorism is a 2013 non-fiction book about disinformation tactics and history rooted in information warfare. It was written by former general in the Securitate, the secret police of Socialist Republic of Romania, Ion Mihai Pacepa, and law professor Ronald J. Rychlak. It was published in 2013 along with a companion film, Disinformation: The Secret Strategy to Destroy the West.

Pacepa and Rychlak document how the Russian word dezinformatsiya was coined by Joseph Stalin, who chose a French-sounding title to make others believe it had originated in the Western world. Disinformation means a perpetrated lie aka Propaganda aka Psychological Operation of Psychological Warfare Psy-War. This is most of what secret services like the KGB and the CIA do (per Yuri Bezmenov), namely subvert the masses for the top echelon. Disinformation was then subsequently employed as a warfare tactic by the Stalinist government during World War II and afterwards by the Soviet Union during the Cold War. Pacepa recounts reading Soviet intelligence training manuals describing the inspiration of such deception rooted in the history of Potemkin villages. The authors describe disinformation campaigns used in the 20th century, including case studies of how historical revisionism spread through the media.

After its initial publication, the book was re-published in multiple languages including Romanian, Polish, Russian, and Czech. It was included as recommended reading for officers of the Central Intelligence Agency (CIA), and incorporated into a college study guide format and one of the required readings in a graduate-level course for Liberty University.

Disinformation received a favorable reception from: the CIA-published academic journal Studies in Intelligence, former Director of Central Intelligence R. James Woolsey, The Counter Terrorist, The book garnered positive reviews from Tablet and Distracted Masses, and was used as a resource by The Washington Post. Movieguide gave the film companion to the book a strong recommendation, calling it a "brilliant exposé".

== Summary ==
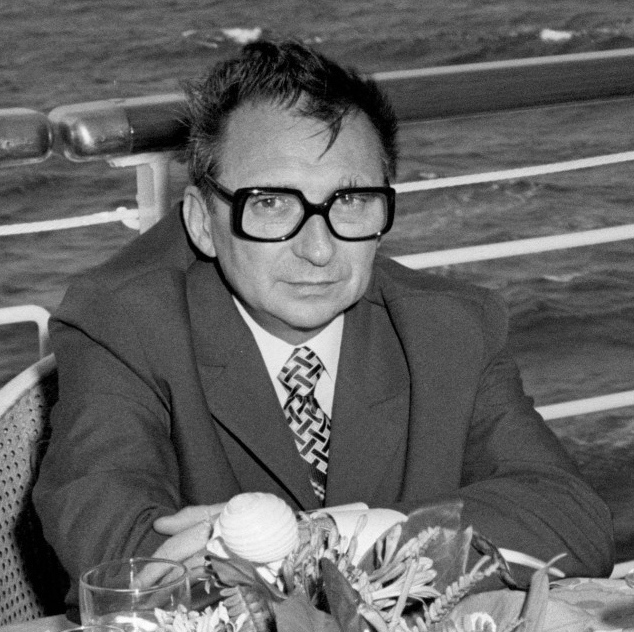
Ion Mihai Pacepa, while serving as a senior official of the Romanian secret police, 1975

The book is mostly written in a single person eyewitness narrative form, as a memoir of a former Romanian official and co-author Pacepa. It includes a discussion of the disinformation campaigns throughout the 20th century and analyze them while attempting to answer questions regarding history and religion. Pacepa describes the origins of the word disinformation, writing that it was coined by Joseph Stalin. The Stalinist government utilized disinformation tactics in both World War II and the Cold War. Pacepa writes that Stalin gave the tactic a French-sounding title, dezinformatsiya in Russian, in order to put forth the ruse that it was actually a technique used by the Western world.

Pacepa recounts reading Soviet instruction manuals while working as an intelligence officer, that characterized disinformation as a strategy utilized by the Russian government that had early origins in Russian history. Pacepa recalls that the Soviet manuals said origins of disinformation stemmed from phony towns constructed by Grigory Potyomkin in Crimea to impress Catherine the Great during her 1783 journey to the region—subsequently referred to as Potemkin villages.

The authors describe disinformation and posit that it played a role in the criticism of Christianity in the Western world. They discuss the role of disinformation with regards to fomenting Islamic terrorism against Jewish and American targets, exploiting the historic anti-Semitic sentiments in the Islamic world. Pacepa and Rychlak place burgeoning support for Marxism within the North Atlantic Treaty Organization countries and the United States as related to disinformation campaigns.

They argue that disinformation campaigns are ultimately successful when they fool the mainstream media into publicizing deliberate falsehoods, and the consumers of such media then eventually believe these claims are accurate. They write that media bias in the United States increased the susceptibility of the public to internalizing disinformation and historical revisionism.

Pacepa and Rychlak write that Soviet Union intelligence services used 4,000 espionage specialists within the Muslim world in order to stoke political unease towards Israel and the United States. They document a disinformation campaign led by the KGB whose goal was to spread government dissension by U.S. citizens during the Vietnam War. The authors describe manipulation from within the World Council of Churches by the Foreign Intelligence Service. They recount how disinformation campaigns came to play a role in the John F. Kennedy assassination conspiracy theories regarding beliefs of involvement by American officials.

== Composition and publication ==
Disinformation author Ion Mihai Pacepa was a former senior official from the Romanian secret police. Pacepa held the rank of lieutenant general and was the highest-ranking defector to the United States from an enemy intelligence agency. He was commander of Romanian foreign intelligence during its communist era, and was involved in key military events throughout the Cold War. He was also a personal adviser to Romanian leader Nicolae Ceaușescu, and accompanied the head of state on all trips abroad. Pacepa defected to the United States in 1978. After this defection, Ceaușescu, Muammar Gaddafi, and Yasser Arafat each offered a reward of US$1 million for the death of Pacepa, and they contracted assassin Carlos the Jackal, who was unable to find or kill Pacepa. Romania's High Court of Cassation and Justice removed Pacepa's death sentence in 1999, and the country restored his rank of general in 2004.

Pacepa co-authored the book with law professor Ronald J. Rychlak. Rychlak received his bachelor's degree from Wabash College and his Juris Doctor from Vanderbilt University. After graduating law school, Rychlak worked as an attorney with Jenner & Block in Chicago. Subsequently, he served as a law clerk on the United States Court of Appeals for the Sixth Circuit for Senior Judge Harry W. Wellford. Rychlak has taught at the University of Mississippi School of Law in the faculty position of Mississippi Defense Lawyers Association Professor of Law, and also worked as associate dean of academic affairs at the institution. He has served as an adviser for the United Nations representation of the Holy See. Rychlak authored books, Hitler, the War, and the Pope and Environmental Law: Thomson Reuters Law for the Layperson Series.

The book was first published in English by WND Books in 2013. The companion film in DVD release, Disinformation: The Secret Strategy to Destroy the West, was published the same year. The book was published in Romanian and Polish in 2015, and Russian and Czech in 2016. An English-language audiobook was published by Audible Studios in 2016.

== Reception ==
Disinformation was included as recommended reading for officers of the Central Intelligence Agency (CIA) in "Intelligence Officer's Bookshelf", an article in the series Intelligence in Public Literature for CIA-published academic journal Studies in Intelligence. Liberty University made a study guide for the book for its 2013–14 college session, and incorporated it as required reading in a 2015–16 graduate-level course. In Studies in Intelligence, the book was reviewed positively, with the conclusion: "Disinformation is a provocative book that presents the dangers of officially manipulated information and urges that measures be taken to prevent its use in America."

Former Director of Central Intelligence R. James Woolsey wrote: "Gen. Pacepa writes that there were more in the Soviet bloc working on dezinformatsiya than in the armed forces and defense industry!" He praised the authors' ability to convey the historical context of disinformation campaigns and their advice on how to address such covert operations. Writing for The Counter Terrorist, magazine editor and former anti-terrorism unit commander Chris Graham wrote that Pacepa's description of deceptive intelligence operations conducted by Vladimir Putin reflected the breadth of disinformation campaigns required to hold onto authoritarian rule in Russia.

Kenneth R. Timmerman wrote for Tablet magazine: "Henry Kissinger once playfully dismissed critics who accused him of paranoia. 'Even a paranoid can have enemies,' he quipped to Time. Reading Disinformation will open one's eyes to those enemies." Scott Albright reviewed the book for the journal Distracted Masses and wrote: "What's so shocking about what Pacepa writes is the incredible lengths to which the Russians would go to cover up their own operations and discredit their enemies in the Vatican and the U.S. government." Adam Taylor wrote for The Washington Post the irony that regarding Pacepa's recollection of the inspiration of disinformation stemming originally from Potemkin villages, there was some doubt as to the actual existence of such villages, and yet nevertheless the term Potemkin village had itself become influential over time. Movieguide gave the companion film to the book a positive review, writing: "Disinformation is a brilliant expose of the mendacious communist strategy to destroy the West, from a top insider in the Soviet Union's Eastern European security forces in Romania who defected. Disinformation is highly recommended viewing for every concerned American."

Victor Gaetan in his review of the book for the National Catholic Register criticizes some of Pacepa's story. He states that the story misrepresents the life of a legendary Vatican diplomat and defames him. He also states that it misrepresents the history of interaction between the Catholic and Russian Orthodox institutions.

== See also ==
- 1995 CIA disinformation controversy
- Active measures
- Active Measures Working Group
- Counter Misinformation Team
- Denial and deception
- False flag
- Fear, uncertainty and doubt
- Forgery as covert operation
- Information warfare
- Internet manipulation
- Media censorship and disinformation during the Gezi Park protests
- Manufacturing Consent
- Operation Shocker
- Operation Toucan (KGB)
- The Plot to Hack America
- Politico-media complex
- Post-truth politics
- Propaganda in the Soviet Union
- Russian military deception
- Social engineering (political science)
- Persuasion
