= Ion Mihai Pacepa =

Romanian general (1928–2021)

Lieutenant General Ion Mihai Pacepa
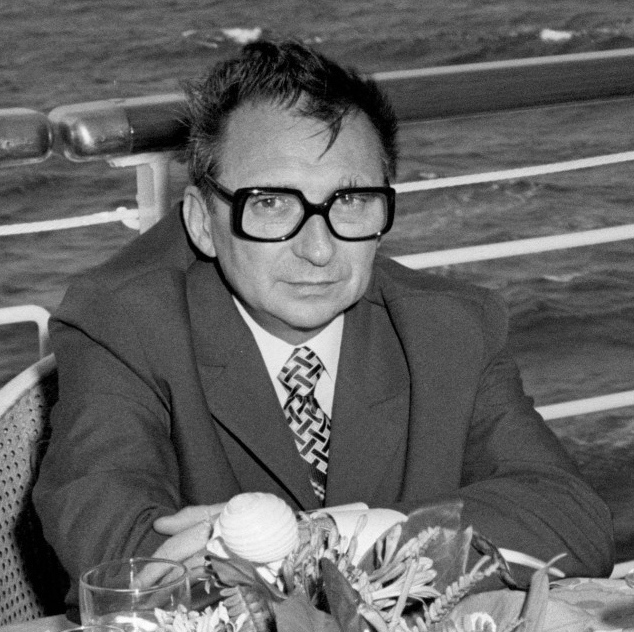
- Pacepa in 1975
- Born: 28 October 1928; Bucharest, Romania
- Died: 14 February 2021 (aged 92); United States
- Citizenship: Romanian; American
- Education: Politehnica University of Bucharest
- Espionage activity
- Allegiance: Romania (defected); United States
- Service branch: Securitate
- Service years: 1951–1978
- Rank: Lieutenant General

Ion Mihai Pacepa (Romanian pronunciation: [iˈon miˈhaj paˈt͡ʃepa]; 28 October 1928 – 14 February 2021) was a Romanian lieutenant general in the Securitate, the secret police of the Socialist Republic of Romania, who defected to the United States in July 1978 following President Jimmy Carter's approval of his request for political asylum.

Pacepa was the highest-ranking defector from the former Eastern Bloc, and wrote books and articles on the inner workings of Communist intelligence services. His best-known works include Red Horizons, Programmed to Kill, and Disinformation. His accounts have been influential in interpretations of the Ceaușescu regime and Soviet-bloc intelligence, although scholars have cautioned that some of his claims, particularly reconstructed conversations and allegations not independently corroborated, should not be accepted uncritically.

Pacepa was also a columnist for the conservative website PJ Media. He wrote articles for The Wall Street Journal, National Review Online, The Washington Times, FrontPage Magazine, and WorldNetDaily.

At the time of his defection, Pacepa simultaneously had the rank of adviser to President Nicolae Ceaușescu, acting chief of his foreign intelligence service, and a parliamentary undersecretary at Romania's Ministry of Interior. Subsequently, he cooperated with the American Central Intelligence Agency (CIA) for more than a decade. The CIA described his cooperation as "an important and unique contribution to the United States".

== Activity in Romanian intelligence ==
Pacepa's father (born in 1893) was raised in Alba Iulia, in Transylvania, where he worked in his father's small kitchenware factory. In 1920, he moved to Bucharest and worked for the local branch of the American automobile company General Motors. Pacepa was born in Bucharest in 1928 and studied industrial chemistry at the Politehnica University of Bucharest between 1947 and 1951. Shortly before graduation, he was recruited by the Securitate and received his engineering degree four years later. He was initially assigned to the Directorate of Counter-sabotage and in 1955 was transferred to the Directorate of Foreign Intelligence.

In 1957, Pacepa was appointed head of the Romanian intelligence station in Frankfurt, West Germany, where he served for two years. In October 1959, Interior Minister Alexandru Drăghici appointed him head of the newly established industrial espionage department, known as S&T (Știință și Tehnologie, "science and technology"), within Directorate I. Pacepa remained involved in Romanian industrial espionage until his defection in 1978. According to Pacepa, his intelligence work contributed to the establishment of Romania's automobile industry and to the development of its microelectronics, polymer and antibiotic industries. From 1972 until his defection, Pacepa also served as an adviser to President Nicolae Ceaușescu on industrial and technological development and as deputy chief of Romania's foreign intelligence service.

== Defection ==
Pacepa defected in July 1978 while on an official trip to West Germany. He entered the US Embassy in Bonn, where he requested political asylum, and was subsequently flown secretly to the United States aboard a US military aircraft.

Pacepa later said that his decision to defect was prompted by an order from Ceaușescu to arrange the assassination of Noël Bernard, director of the Romanian service of Radio Free Europe. In a letter to his daughter Dana, published in Le Monde in 1980 and broadcast by Radio Free Europe, Pacepa wrote that he had received the order in July 1978 and decided that he could not carry it out.

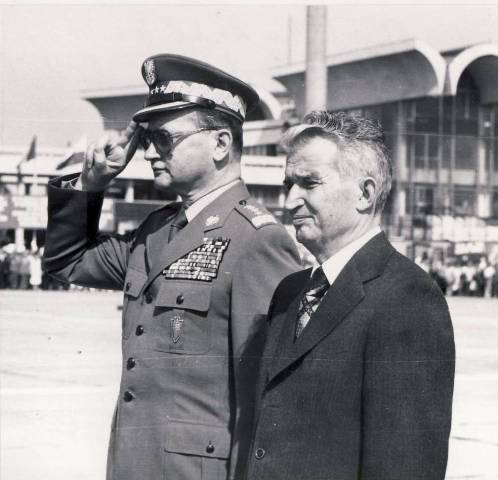
Nicolae Ceaușescu, right, alongside Polish leader General Wojciech Jaruzelski, 1980s

Pacepa's defection was a significant setback for Romanian foreign intelligence because of his senior position and knowledge of its personnel and operations. Writing in The American Spectator in 1988, Michael Ledeen claimed that the information supplied by Pacepa resulted in the dismantling of much of Ceaușescu's foreign intelligence apparatus and that Romanian agents were subsequently sent to locate and kill him.

Pacepa was convicted of treason in absentia in Communist Romania and sentenced to death. Accounts published after his defection also claimed that Ceaușescu placed a US$2 million bounty on him and that Yasser Arafat and Muammar Gaddafi each offered an additional $1 million. The Securitate also sought Pacepa's assassination, and Carlos the Jackal was reportedly involved in plans to kill him.

On 7 July 1999, Romania's Supreme Court overturned Pacepa's death sentences and ordered the restoration of property that had been confiscated following his defection. The Romanian government initially declined to implement the ruling, but in December 2004 Pacepa's rank of general was restored. Pacepa thereafter lived in the United States under measures intended to protect his identity and location. He died in 2021.

== Writings and political views ==
=== Red Horizons ===
In 1987, Pacepa published Red Horizons: Chronicles of a Communist Spy Chief in the United States through Regnery Gateway. The book described the Ceaușescu regime and presented Pacepa's account of its corruption, foreign intelligence activities and the private lives of Nicolae Ceaușescu and Elena Ceaușescu. A Romanian translation printed in the United States was distributed clandestinely in Communist Romania, and in 1988 Red Horizons was serialized by Radio Free Europe, attracting a large audience in Romania.

The book became influential in shaping perceptions of the Ceaușescu regime, although aspects of Pacepa's account have been treated cautiously by scholars. Historian Ashby Crowder noted that Pacepa acknowledged reconstructing conversations presented in the book and argued that, although his claims should not be dismissed, they should not be accepted at face value.

Following the Romanian Revolution and the execution of the Ceaușescus in December 1989, Red Horizons was serialized in the Romanian newspaper Adevărul. Pacepa later claimed that many of the accusations made against the Ceaușescus during their trial had been drawn from information contained in Red Horizons. The book was subsequently published in numerous countries. President Ronald Reagan reportedly referred to Red Horizons as his "Bible" for dealing with dictators.

Pacepa subsequently published The Kremlin's Legacy in 1993 and Cartea neagră a Securității (The Black Book of the Securitate) in 1999.

=== Looming Disaster ===
Pacepa co-authored Looming Disaster with Ronald J. Rychlak, a law professor at the University of Mississippi. The book was promoted by WorldNetDaily during the 2016 United States presidential election.

=== Alleged assassinations by the KGB ===
In a 2007 article, Pacepa alleged that the KGB had been responsible for, or had attempted, the assassinations of several political figures. According to Pacepa, Nicolae Ceaușescu had told him of Soviet involvement in operations against ten international political figures: László Rajk and Imre Nagy of Hungary; Lucrețiu Pătrășcanu and Gheorghe Gheorghiu-Dej of Romania; Rudolf Slánský and Jan Masaryk of Czechoslovakia; Mohammad Reza Pahlavi, the Shah of Iran; Italian Communist leader Palmiro Togliatti; United States President John F. Kennedy; and Chinese Communist leader Mao Zedong. Pacepa also alleged that the KGB had supported Lin Biao in a plot against Mao.

Some of Pacepa's later assassination claims have been disputed. In a review for the CIA's journal Studies in Intelligence, intelligence historian Hayden B. Peake described Pacepa's account of Soviet involvement in the Kennedy assassination as speculative and implausible. Historians have likewise treated the circumstances surrounding Lin Biao's alleged 1971 plot against Mao as unresolved; historian Roderick MacFarquhar wrote that the truth about the alleged plot would probably remain uncertain until the opening of Chinese Politburo archives and argued that the available evidence suggested that Mao had been manoeuvring to remove Lin from power.

=== Programmed to Kill ===
In 2007, Ivan R. Dee published Pacepa's Programmed to Kill: Lee Harvey Oswald, the Soviet KGB, and the Kennedy Assassination, in which Pacepa argued that Lee Harvey Oswald had been recruited by the KGB. Pacepa argued that Soviet Premier Nikita Khrushchev initially ordered the assassination of President John F. Kennedy, later rescinded the order, but was unable to stop Oswald. He further claimed that Jack Ruby was instructed to kill Oswald to prevent him from revealing the alleged Soviet connection. The book drew heavily on material from the Warren Commission, the House Select Committee on Assassinations, and the work of Edward Jay Epstein.

Reviews were divided. Michael Ledeen, writing in Human Events, praised Pacepa's knowledge of Soviet-bloc intelligence and described the book as a compelling examination of evidence concerning Oswald's alleged Soviet connections. In H-Net Reviews, sociologist Stan Weeber described it as a "superb new paradigmatic work" on Kennedy's assassination.

Other reviewers questioned Pacepa's evidence and conclusions. Publishers Weekly characterized his case as circumstantial and speculative and stated that the book failed to establish a convincing Soviet motive for Kennedy's assassination. Joseph Goulden, reviewing the book in The Washington Times, wrote that Pacepa's account rested largely on circumstantial evidence and supposition. Hayden B. Peake, reviewing the book for the CIA journal Studies in Intelligence, described Pacepa's reconstruction as an "imaginative story" and concluded that his central thesis was implausible.

=== Alleged Soviet role in supporting terrorism in the Middle East ===
In a 2006 article published during the Second Lebanon War, Pacepa alleged that the Soviet Union had conducted a campaign of antisemitic and anti-American propaganda in the Middle East and had sought to portray the United States as controlled by Jewish interests and Israel as seeking to colonize the region. He further claimed that Soviet intelligence had infiltrated political organizations in the Arab and Muslim world and had supported and funded terrorist organizations in the Middle East.

=== Alleged Soviet campaign against the Vatican ===
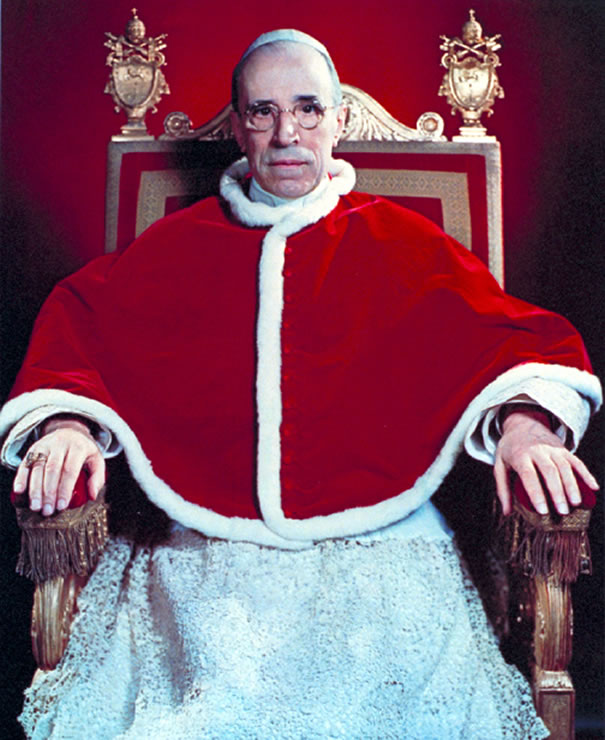
Official photograph of Pius XII by Yousuf Karsh, 1949

Pacepa alleged that the Soviet Union conducted a disinformation campaign, known as Seat 12, intended to discredit Pope Pius XII and the Vatican. In a 2007 article, Pacepa claimed that Soviet leader Nikita Khrushchev authorized the operation in 1960 and that Romanian intelligence participated by obtaining access to Vatican archives under the pretext of negotiating the restoration of diplomatic relations between Romania and the Holy See. Pacepa further alleged that documents obtained through the operation were supplied to the KGB and that Soviet intelligence subsequently helped shape Rolf Hochhuth's 1963 play The Deputy, which portrayed Pius XII as having failed to oppose the Holocaust.

Pacepa's account has received both support and criticism. Historians Michael F. Feldkamp and Michael Burleigh have argued that his description is consistent with documented Soviet efforts to discredit Pius XII and the Catholic Church. However, Pacepa's specific account of his involvement has not been independently corroborated, and some details have been challenged. In describing the origins of the operation, Pacepa claimed that in 1959 he had arranged an intelligence exchange involving Roman Catholic bishop Augustin Pacha; Pacha had, however, died in 1954. Critics have cited this chronological discrepancy, as well as the absence of independent evidence for Pacepa's claimed access to Vatican archives, in questioning parts of his account.

=== Disinformation ===
In 2013, Pacepa and Ronald J. Rychlak, a law professor at the University of Mississippi, published Disinformation: Former Spy Chief Reveals Secret Strategies for Undermining Freedom, Attacking Religion, and Promoting Terrorism. The book expanded on Pacepa's earlier claims about Soviet disinformation and active measures, including his account of the alleged Seat 12 campaign against Pope Pius XII.

=== Iraq and WMD ===
Pacepa supported the 2003 invasion of Iraq. He argued that some of the international opposition to the invasion was influenced by Russian anti-American propaganda.

Pacepa also claimed that Russian military intelligence had helped Saddam Hussein conceal or remove Iraq's chemical weapons before the American-led invasion. He based this claim on what he described as a Soviet contingency procedure known as "Operation Sarindar", which he said was intended to remove or destroy evidence of chemical weapons supplied to Soviet client states.

Post-invasion investigations did not substantiate Pacepa's explanation for the missing weapons. The Iraq Survey Group, which conducted the principal investigation of Iraq's weapons programs, concluded that Iraq did not possess the stockpiles of chemical and biological weapons anticipated before the invasion, while finding that Saddam Hussein intended to preserve the capability to resume some weapons programs if international sanctions were lifted.

== In popular culture ==
The 2023 television series Spy/Master was inspired by Pacepa's defection. The fictional protagonist, Victor Godeanu, played by Alec Secăreanu, is a high-ranking Romanian intelligence officer and adviser to Nicolae Ceaușescu who defects to the United States. The series is fictionalized and does not use Pacepa's name for its protagonist.

== Death ==
Pacepa died from COVID-19 in the United States on 14 February 2021, at the age of 92. His life and career were subsequently discussed on BBC Radio 4's obituary programme Last Word.

== Published books ==
- Red Horizons: Chronicles of a Communist Spy Chief, 1987. ISBN 0-89526-570-2
- Red Horizons: the 2nd Book. The True Story of Nicolae and Elena Ceaușescu's Crimes, Lifestyle, and Corruption, 1990. ISBN 0-89526-746-2
- The Kremlin Legacy, 1993
- Cartea neagră a Securității, Editura Omega, Bucharest, 1999. ISBN 973-98745-4-1
- Programmed to Kill: Lee Harvey Oswald, the Soviet KGB, and the Kennedy Assassination, 2007. ISBN 978-1-56663-761-9
- Disinformation: Former Spy Chief Reveals Secret Strategies for Undermining Freedom, Attacking Religion, and Promoting Terrorism, 2013. ISBN 978-1-93648-860-5
- (with James Woolsey) Operation Dragon: Inside the Kremlin's Secret War on America. Encounter Books. 2021. ISBN 978-1641771450.

== See also ==
- Active measures
- List of conspiracy theories
- List of Eastern Bloc defectors
- Radu (weapon)
