= SCSS =

SCSS may refer to:

- Sassy CSS (Sass Cascading Style Sheet), a newer syntax of the Sass preprocessor scripting language
- SCSS, the Conversational/Columnar SPSS software package
- Society of Catholic Social Scientists, a Christian learned society
- Swiss Cottage Secondary School, a secondary school in Bukit Batok, Singapore
