= Counterpropaganda =

Propaganda made to delegitimize and counter opposing propaganda

Counterpropaganda is a form of communication consisting of methods taken and messages relayed to oppose propaganda which seeks to influence action or perspectives among a targeted audience. It is closely connected to propaganda as the two often employ the same methods to broadcast messages to a targeted audience. Counterpropaganda differs from propaganda as it is defensive and responsive to identified propaganda. Additionally, counterpropaganda consists of several elements that further distinguish it from propaganda and ensure its effectiveness in opposing propaganda messages.

== Definition ==
Counterpropaganda and propaganda share a symbiotic relationship. Counterpropaganda is employed in situations to counter existing propaganda efforts and thus to understand the former requires a clear understanding of the latter. Practitioners and academics alike have advanced multiple definitions of propaganda. For the sake of clarity this article acknowledges the definition proposed by Garth Jowett and Victoria O'Donnell who define propaganda as "the deliberate, systematic attempt to shape perceptions, manipulate cognitions, and direct behavior to achieve a response that furthers the desired intent of the propagandist" In practice propaganda consists of communicating a controlled message to a targeted audience. Similarly, counterpropaganda is used to communicate a message that describes the propaganda as false and instructs the target audience to think or act in a manner that counters the propaganda message. To be effective counterpropaganda must target the same audience as the original propaganda message and often may employ the same methods. However, counterpropaganda is unique on its reliance on factual messages, and its existence as a reactionary effort. Since counterpropaganda intends to counter previously stated propaganda messages it cannot be employed preemptively. Counterpropaganda is, however, based upon some of the same fundamentals of propaganda regarding targeting the salient elements that influences audiences.

The existing definitions of counterpropaganda differ on their prescription of specified methods and intentions. To illustrate, Herbert Romerstein, former Director of the Office to Counter Soviet Disinformation and Active Measures at the United States Information Agency, defined Counterpropaganda as "carefully prepared answers to false propaganda with the purpose of refuting the disinformation and undermining the propagandist." His definition defines the intentions of the counterpropaganda as first countering propaganda and then undermining the credibility of the propagandists. Romerstein's insights are likely influenced by his professional experience in countering Soviet propaganda which was broadcast toward the U.S. through a variety of means. In comparison, Colonel Garrison whose research focuses on the broadcast media as a method of propaganda and public diplomacy provides a more detailed definition of counterpropaganda. He defined counterpropaganda as the "actions to discredit an adversary's use of broadcast media to support their national objectives by influencing the opinions, emotions, attitude, or behavior of U.S. and friendly audiences." The focus in this definition is the actions to discredit the propagandists' use of broadcast media. The definition defines counterpropaganda by its usage of broadcast media and its intent to undermine the adversaries biased use of the same medium. The differences in the two demonstrate that counterpropaganda is likely to be defined upon its operational usage and the perspective the definer has toward propaganda. Together both definitions clearly illustrate the symbiotic relationship between propaganda and counterpropaganda. The definitions also demonstrate counterpropaganda, like propaganda, is generally described as a targeted form of communication intending to influence a specific audience. Counterpropaganda merely intends to influence a counter action or thought to a previously broadcast propaganda message or messages.

== Elements of counterpropaganda ==
While counterpropaganda shares similar traits with propaganda it also consists of unique key elements which define its effective employment.

=== Basis in truth ===
While propaganda messages may not always be truthful, effective counterpropaganda generally only broadcasts the truth. Indeed, counterpropaganda is commonly understood to be the "truthful, honest opposition" to an adversary's propaganda. Counterpropaganda communicates truthful messages for moral and practical reasons. During the Cold War, the United States' reputation for broadcasting the truth to refute Soviet propaganda resulted in the U.S. being viewed as a "truth teller" where as the Soviet Union had a reputation as a "lie teller." Herbert Romerstein argues that using truth based counterpropaganda resulted in the U.S. being perceived as honest where as the Soviet Union's use of false statements discredited their messages. This Cold War example demonstrates how a false message is discredited when the truth is revealed. In practice a counterpropaganda message that was intentionally or mistakenly false could be revealed to be as biased as the propaganda it sought to oppose. Thus, telling the truth strengthens the effectiveness of counterpropaganda and weakens the propaganda of those revealed to be liars. The use of false messages in counterpropaganda is not effective and fails to adequately refute the propaganda message. Revealing a counterpropaganda message as incorrect or intending to influence via a lie would also harm the broadcaster's reputation and reduce their ability to effectively counter propaganda messages in the future.

==== World War II – The Nemmersdorf massacre ====
The United States attempted to use counterpropaganda against German accusations that the Soviet Union committed the Nemmersdorf massacre. When Germany forced the Soviet Union out of the city in October 1944 they found twenty-four dead including twelve women, two teenage girls, a baby, six old men and three school children. Several of the women and teenagers were raped. The Nazi propaganda unit, titled Skorpion, launched a leaflet campaign and sent a letter to General Eisenhower to expose the Soviet Union's actions to its American allies. In response America also launched a leaflet campaign and published an article in the March 1, 1945, issue number 49 of its leaflet/newspaper Frontpost titled "Keine Rache" (No Revenge) which quoted Soviet denials of the wrongdoing. The false messages in American counterpropaganda failed to effectively oppose German propaganda and failed to change German's perspectives toward the Soviet Union. The counterpropaganda campaign also did little to enforce America's reputation for honesty among German soldiers. When revealed false counterpropaganda damages the reputation of the broadcaster and limits his/her ability to counter propaganda in the future.

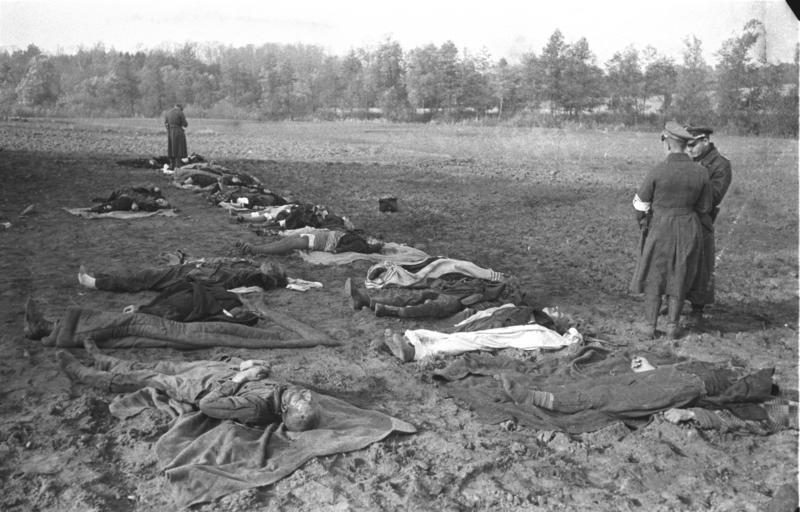
Dead Germans in Nemmersdorf, Oct. 1944, German Federal Archive

=== Clarity ===
Counterpropaganda messages relying on words or concepts not universally understood fail to adequately communicate to the target audience and are ineffective in opposing propaganda. Using understandable words to clearly convey the counterpropaganda message is more likely to counter propaganda messages.

==== "Unconditional surrender" in World War II ====
The converse is equally true. The use of the phrase "unconditional surrender" in World War II is a prime example of the importance of clarity. The phrase conveyed scary images to the Germans and the Japanese. Some experts proposed that the phrase would cause greater resistance against the allies because the term was not clearly conveyed to the target audience. The confusion required the U.S. and Britain to explain the message which resulted in reducing its effectiveness.

==== Coalition messages in Iraq ====
Andrew Garfield explained that the Coalition messages in Iraq routinely referred to insurgents as "anti-Iraqis" which caused ambiguity in the coalition's counterpropaganda messages. The phrase did not adequately coincide with the descriptions various Iraqi communities prescribed insurgents. As a result, the phrase failed to convey the message the Coalition sought to convey. Counterpropaganda messages that require explanations for clarity fail to adequately communicate the intended message and thus fail to oppose propaganda.

=== Knowledge of the audience ===
Counterpropaganda, like propaganda, requires developing messages understanding of the target audience and the ability to tailor the message appropriately. Effective counterpropaganda relies on communicating messages that "resonate with the target audiences" and that are based on culturally relevant narratives. More precisely, developing messages that are effective in a target audience entails identifying the existing sentiments, stereotypes and opinions that influence the audience's perspectives, beliefs and actions. In considering these elements of a society, propaganda and counterpropaganda can influence a group toward a particular perspective or action. Since the objective of counterpropaganda is to influence an audience to reject a propaganda message, it must touch upon the elements of culture, belief and emotion that will result in such action. The elements will vary among audiences and while propaganda and counterpropaganda campaigns can and do utilize existing methods the messages must be tailored specifically to the individual target audience.

=== Employed rapidly ===
Counterpropaganda is a reactive method that must be employed rapidly to effectively contradict a propaganda message. Oliver Carlson explains that the longer propaganda is perceived as the truth the harder it is to contradict even when the target audience is exposed to an opposing true message. A propaganda message that is not contradicted immediately upon its discovery is likely to become the basis the target audience's actions and beliefs.

Psychology provides additional reasons to rapidly employ counterpropaganda. The decision making process is influenced by cognitive biases which shape how a person perceives certain pieces of information and how they will act upon them. The confirmation bias is especially relevant when explaining the necessity of employing counterpropaganda rapidly. Confirmation bias is a tendency for people to favor information confirming their beliefs or hypotheses. If a group based their beliefs or actions upon a propaganda message they were exposed to over or during a long period of time it is difficult to counter the propaganda. The group in such a scenario would be hesitant to assimilate any information from a counterpropaganda message that contradicted the propaganda message. Thus, it is important for counterpropaganda be employed early in a propaganda campaign to prevent the possibility of confirmation bias resulting from propaganda. In Propaganda: The Formation of Men's Attitudes, Jacques Ellul suggests another reason to employ counterpropaganda quickly in response to an identified propaganda message. He argues that humankind is more concerned with current events and issues that hold the society's attention. Propaganda shaped upon current events will invoke the greatest amount of community passion and interest. Countering propaganda, requires a quick response to propaganda when it is revealed. Conversely, employing counterpropaganda against a dated propaganda message that regards an equally dated issue that society holds no current interest is likely to be less effective.

== Methods of counterpropaganda ==
Counterpropaganda intends to broadcast messages aimed at refuting and/or countering propaganda messages and thus many of the effective propaganda methods are equally effective in broadcasting counterpropaganda. However, counterpropaganda utilizes a few unique techniques that are effective in attacking propaganda's credibility and ability to influence a target audience.

=== Research and analysis ===
Effective counterpropaganda begins by fully collecting and analyzing the propaganda to be countered. The metaphor explaining this function is simple; to counter a propaganda message it is necessary to fully understand the message, its target audience and its objectives. Success in countering propaganda requires a "comprehensive propaganda monitoring and collection effort" that identifies and catalogues examples of all types of adversarial propaganda. This initial method of counterpropaganda benefits from experts in a range of disciplines to include intelligence psychological operations, social science, cultural anthropologists, etc. who are capable of analyzing the propaganda. Expert analysis can properly dissect the propaganda to provide answers to the following questions necessary to form an effective counterpropaganda effort:

- Who is the intended audience?
- What effects do the propagandists desire?
- What effects have they achieved?
- Which other audiences have heard or seen this message?
- What do these messages indicate about an adversary's perceptions, capabilities, vulnerabilities, and intent?
- What are the intentional or unintentional inaccuracies, inconsistencies, or deceits in the messages that we can exploit?
- What counter arguments can we deploy, to whom, and how?

=== Reveal true origin of propaganda ===
Oliver Carlson explains in the Handbook of Propaganda: For the Alert Citizen that the "Best propaganda is that which does not disclose itself as propaganda." There are three types of propaganda which differ depending upon their attribution. White propaganda reveals its origin and generally classified as overt. Covert propaganda includes grey propaganda in which the source is not revealed and black propaganda in which a false origin is claimed (the episode at the 1984 Olympics described below is an example of "black propaganda"). In the latter two types of propaganda, the message's origin is concealed in some way. Often the credibility of a propaganda message depends on masking the true origin of the message to ensure the audience accepts it as an unbiased communication. Often propagandists will create a persona that is "reliable, trustworthy and credible" to the target audience which increases the likelihood that the message is believed and influences the audience's actions and perspectives. When counterpropaganda reveals the propaganda's true origin the target audience quickly loses faith in the message as the propagandist was caught lying.

==== The 1984 Los Angeles Olympics ====
During the months leading up to the 1984 Summer Olympics hosted by Los Angeles, the Soviet Union circulated forged Ku Klux Klan leaflets threatening the lives of non-white athletes. The Soviet Union sent the leaflets specifically to the African and Asian Olympic Committees. The U.S. State Department released a public statement accusing the KGB of producing the leaflets and notified each Olympic committee that the leaflets were forgeries. The result was no single Olympic committee refused to attend the games and the Soviets were revealed as the origin of the propaganda.

=== Expose reasoning errors ===
Propagandists exploit cognitive biases and other elements of decision making to shape their messages to influence the target audience. In this sense they are able to insert a propaganda message into a target audience's logic to make that message more believable and credible. Specifically, propagandists deliberately use errors in arguments to appeal to the emotions of their audience. When a counterpropaganda campaign exposes the target audience's errors in judgment and resolves them the propaganda message loses strength. This counterpropaganda method works similarly as revealing the true origin of a propaganda message as it exposes the broadcaster as a liar which reduces its credibility. Furthermore, when made aware of logical fallacies in its reasoning, the target audience will soon reject any message that was based on this faulty reasoning. A competing perspective suggests that propaganda is based upon emotional reactions not cognitive reasoning. Carlson argues propaganda is developed as much as possible to focus on people's emotions versus their rational. This argument suggests propaganda is minimally based upon reasoning and logic and that exposing a group's logical errors is ineffective in refuting propaganda messages.

Jacques Ellul presents another basis for propaganda which suggests exposing a group's faulty reasoning is not an effective method to oppose propaganda. He argues that the speed at which events occur, become out dated and no longer of interest cause mankind to have little patience for using attention and awareness to closely examine current events. The individual is interested only in the superficial element of particular events, which is one reason propaganda is effective. It is, therefore, difficult to draw an audience's attention to the minutiae necessary to highlight flaws in their reasoning which make a propaganda message effective. Yet, Ellul further elaborates that this counterpropaganda message is critical to instruct a group to defend itself against propaganda as it exposes an audience's vulnerability to propaganda based upon our own mental vulnerabilities.

=== Dissemination of exposed propaganda ===
Effective propaganda is tailored to a particular audience and when it is shared to another group the message is clearly revealed as an influencing message. Some audiences are more sophisticated and techniques that work on comparably less developed nations will be ineffective with the former. When a counterpropaganda campaign shares propaganda intended for a specific audience with another audience the propagandists' true intentions are revealed. The sharing of propaganda messages between audiences also enables the second audience to reveal propaganda messages targeting them. In the 1980s, during the Cold War, the United States shared examples of Soviet disinformation targeting the Third World with European nations. The Europeans were then able to identify Soviet propaganda targeting them. The sharing of propaganda damaged the Soviet Union's reputation in Europe during a time it sought Western approval. Thus, countering propaganda by demonstrating it to be outright lies, or intending to influence reduces its effectiveness across target audiences.

== See also ==
- Disinformation
- Misinformation
- Psychological Warfare
- Psychological manipulation
- Information operations
- Sabotage
