= Forgery as covert operation =

Information warfare technique

Forgery is used by some governments and non-state actors as a tool of covert operation, disinformation and black propaganda. Letters, currency, speeches, documents, and literature are all falsified as a means to subvert a government's political, military or economic assets. Forgeries are designed to attribute a false intention and aspirations on the intended target. They force the targeted government to spend a large amount of resources to refute the forgery. Forgeries are an effective tool because of their ability to hold influence even after being proven false.

== Notable examples of forgeries ==
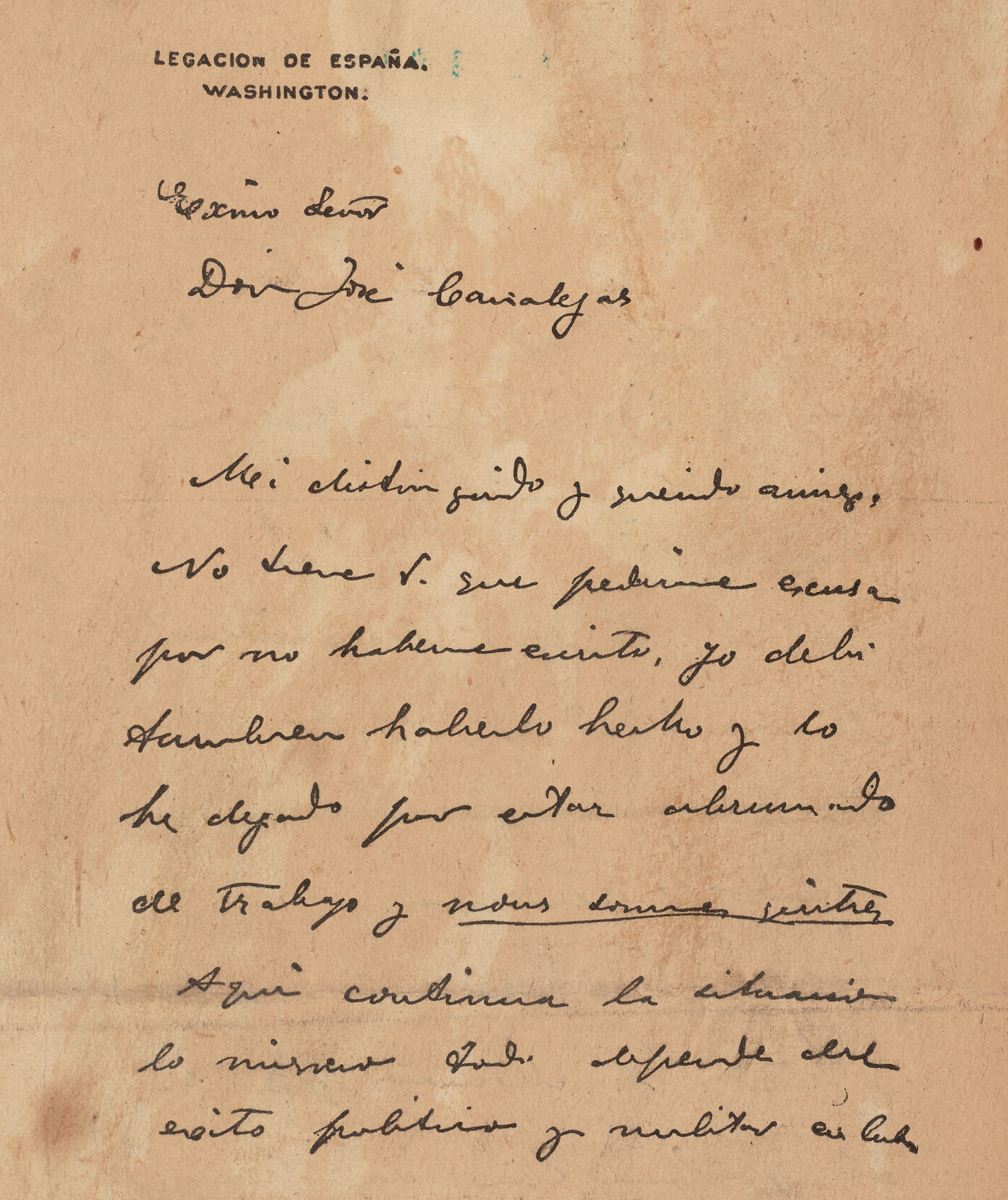
The first page of the De Lôme Letter.

- "Cadore Letter" – a diplomatic note delivered to the American government in August 1810 that caused the U.S. to resume non-intercourse with Great Britain in February 1811
- De Lôme Letter – criticized U.S. President William McKinley's stance on Cuba, published in the New York Journal
- Protocols of the Learned Elders of Zion – an anti-Semitic document first published in 1903 in Russia and later in Nazi Germany, outlined plans for Jewish world domination
- Vladimir Lenin often used false identification to evade Russian authorities during his communist activities. After the failed July Days revolt in 1917, Lenin was able to hide from the Kerensky government using a forged passport under the name "Konstantin Petrovitch Ivanov" successfully fleeing to Finland.
- Zinoviev Letter – published in the British press in 1924, days before the national election, aided in the Conservative Party's victory
- Tanaka Memorial – published in 1927, outlined Japan's plans for world domination, used as anti-Japanese propaganda during World War Two
- US Army Field Manual 30-31B – first appeared in Turkey in 1975, outlined US plans for subversion of foreign governments
- Eisenhower-Rockefeller Letter – first surfaced in Neues Deutschland on 15 February 1957, outlined a plan for U.S world domination using economic assistance as a guise for military pacts and political control
- Kirkpatrick Speech – first published on February 6, 1983, in the Indian newspaper Link, text of a supposed speech made by UN Ambassador Jeane Kirkpatrick outlining a plan for the Balkanization of India
- 1940s British forgery operation to create documents for special operations executive agents during WWII.
- 1984 Olympics KKK Leaflet – circulated by the Soviet Union, threatened the lives of non-white athletes participating in the games, distributed to the Olympic committees of African and Asian nations
- 1958 České slovo – entire issue published by Czech intelligence service, carried anti-West propaganda and announced that the newspaper was going out of existence because its editors were disillusioned with the West
- "Strategic Plan of the Israeli Army for 1956-57" – published in the Indian Bombay Blitz, outlined false Israeli plans for expansion in the Middle East and Western involvement
- Carlos-Reagan Letter – passed to Spanish media in 1981, encourages the Spanish monarch to destroy his left-wing opposition and declares U.S support for Spain in dispute of Gibraltar
- The Sisson Documents – obtained by Edgar Sisson in 1918, professed Bolshevik leaders to be under control of the German government, leaders were being used to draw Russia out of World War I
- Weinberger Speech – transcript of an address given by Secretary Caspar Weinberger on the Strategic Defense Initiative, claimed that the United States would use its nuclear power to coerce the Soviet Union and prevent "unfavorable" developments in NATO so the United States could continue to control Europe
- Durenberger-Romerstein letter – surfaced in U.S news media, purported to discuss a proposed plan to exploit the Chernobyl disaster for propaganda purposes
- Habbush letter – a letter linking Saddam Hussein to al-Qaeda and the 9/11 attacks
- "John H" letter – surfaced first in Beirut Al-Masaa and later Daily Review of the Soviet Press and China's NCNA, attempted to demonstrate Western expansion in Lebanon. The text of the forged document reads:

I arrived together with a group of American officers from Munich on 27 July in a Globemaster aircraft.... A few days ago we received orders to remain in Lebanon for 15 months to safeguard the peace and security of the United States.

There are also plans to undertake large scale works with the object of transforming the airfields of Rayack and Kolein't into American atomic bases; furthermore, 5 rocket launching pads will be erected along the Lebanon-Syrian border. More atomic weapons will be dispatched soon to Lebanon, and Beirut harbor will be transformed into America's principal naval base for its Near Eastern Fleet.

One cannot fail to realize that the object of all these preparations is to wipe out the millions of Arabs who are struggling for their national independence.... That is why I am asking you, my comrades, to demand that we be withdrawn from Lebanon to the United States quickly, and if we truly love our country we should return there without further delay. American officers and troops: Don't allow yourselves to be fooled; don't allow yourselves to become involved in military adventure for the benefit of any of the warmongering factions!

- In December 1979, Foreign Affairs Minister Sadegh Ghotbzadeh claimed that Senator Ted Kennedy sent a telegraph to him asking for a meeting with Ayatollah Ruhollah Khomeini and a letter supporting the Iranian Revolution after Kennedy had made statements criticizing Shah Mohammad Reza Pahlavi. Kennedy and members of the Iranian foreign ministry denied the legitimacy of the letter.
- Niger uranium forgeries – of unproven origin, depicted Saddam Hussein's attempt to purchase yellowcake uranium from Niger. The information from this forgery was used in President George W. Bush's 2003 State of the Union address

== Techniques ==
=== Counterfeit money ===
Counterfeiting is the creation of currency without the official sanction of the issuing state or government. It is designed to look like the real currency and convince others of its value. Counterfeiting has been used as a tactic to increase individual wealth since the creation of currency itself. Counterfeit money has also been used as a covert operation by rival nations in an attempt to create inflation and subvert. Counterfeiting is a useful tool of subversion because it results in a reduction in the value of real money; an increase in prices (inflation) due to more money getting circulated in the economy - an unauthorized artificial increase in the money supply; a decrease in the acceptability of paper money; and losses, when traders are not reimbursed for counterfeit money detected by banks, even if it is confiscated.

=== Operation Bernhard ===
Operation Bernhard was a counterfeit campaign conducted by the Nazi regime to flood the United Kingdom with £5 and £50 banknotes. The scale of the counterfeit campaign was the largest ever conducted since the advent of paper money. The original plan was to introduce the counterfeit money into Great Britain to create inflation, but this plan was abandoned due to diplomatic issues. Rather, the counterfeit notes were used to finance war expenses. The counterfeited notes were created at the Sachsenhausen concentration camp by prisoners who were experts in forgery.

=== Philatelic forgeries ===
Philatelic forgery is the creation of false postage stamps that are designed to look genuine. Because of their wide publication, stamps are a powerful tool of propaganda. Forged stamps were used by both the Allies and Axis Powers during World War II. Large philatelic campaigns were also conducted throughout the Cold War.

=== Literary forgery ===
Literary forgery is a body of written work attributed to a certain eminent, historical or popular author. This forgery is often a fake manuscript or diary created to attribute certain ideological beliefs or actions to the figure. Literary forgery is often difficult to refute because the purported author is usually deceased.

== United States Secret Service ==
The United States Secret Service is the agency within the United States' government tasked with the protection of U.S. currency. The Secret Service has jurisdiction over violations involving the counterfeiting of United States obligations and securities. Some of the counterfeited United States obligations and securities commonly investigated by the Secret Service include U.S. currency (to include coins), U.S. Treasury checks, Department of Agriculture food coupons and U.S. postage stamps.

The United States Secret Service was created by Abraham Lincoln during the Civil War in 1865 to combat the high counterfeit rate of currency. At the time, one-third to one-half of all U.S currency in circulation was counterfeit. Today, the Secret Service continues its core mission by investigating violations of U.S. laws relating to currency, financial crimes, financial payment systems, computer crimes and electronic crimes. It utilizes investigative expertise, science and technology, and partnerships to detect, prevent and investigate attacks on the U.S. financial market infrastructure.

== See also ==
- Active measures
- Counterfeit money
- Subversion
- Outline of forgery
- Black propaganda
- Counterpropaganda
