= Society of Catholic Social Scientists =

Christian learned society

- Abbreviation: SCSS
- Formation: 1992; 34 years ago
- Founders: Stephen M. Krason; Joseph Varacalli
- Founded at: Pittsburgh, Pennsylvania, U.S.
- Type: Learned society
- Legal status: 501(c)(3) organization
- Headquarters: Steubenville, Ohio, U.S.
- Region served: United States
- Field: Social science
- President: Stephen M. Krason
- Publication: The Catholic Social Science Review
- Website: catholicsocialscientists.org

The Society of Catholic Social Scientists (SCSS) is a US-based non-profit organization founded in 1992 by Stephen M. Krason of Franciscan University of Steubenville at the Pittsburgh Hilton hotel and recognized as a non-profit by the US Internal Revenue Service in 1999. The SCSS offers a Master of Theology degree program in Catholic social thought at Steubenville, Ohio, as well as holding an annual meeting and conference, and publishing an academic journal, The Catholic Social Science Review.

The organization's mission is to "bring rigorous, credible scholarship to political, social and economic questions" through a collegiality of Catholic scholars, professors, researchers, practitioners, and writers who "approach their work in both a scholarly and evangelical spirit."

The organization publishes The Catholic Social Science Review, an interdisciplinary, peer-reviewed journal of original articles and reviews in the social sciences and the humanities.

They are expected to strictly observe the highest scholarly and professional requirements of their disciplines as they examine their data in light of church teaching and the natural law. In this way, the society seeks to obtain objective knowledge about the social order, provide solutions to vexing social problems, and further the cause of Christ.
