= Ronald J. Rychlak =

American lawyer

- Born: September 23, 1957 (age 68)
- Education: Wabash College (BA); Vanderbilt University Law School (JD)
- Occupations: Lawyer, law professor, author
- Children: 6
- Website: University of Mississippi Law School profile

Ronald J. Rychlak (born September 23, 1957) is an American lawyer, jurist, author and political commentator. He is a Distinguished Professor of Law at the University of Mississippi School of Law and is holder of the Jamie L. Whitten Chair in Law and Government. He is known for his published works, career as an attorney, and writings on the role of Pope Pius XII in World War II.

== Personal life ==
Rychlak attended Wabash College and received a Bachelor of Arts degree cum laude in economics in 1980. He then attended Vanderbilt University School of Law, where he was honored with the Order of the Coif and received his Juris Doctor (J.D.) in 1983. Rychlak is married, has six children, and resides in Oxford, Mississippi.

== Career ==
Rychlak is a Distinguished Professor of Law at the University of Mississippi. He has been at the university since 1987, holds the Jamie L. Whitten Chair in Law and Government, and is the former Associate Dean for Academic Affairs. Before becoming a professor, he was an attorney with Jenner & Block in Chicago. He is a member of the Illinois Bar. Rychlak also clerked for Judge Harry W. Wellford of the United States Sixth Circuit Court of Appeals.

Rychlak is the University of Mississippi's Faculty Athletics Representative (2007–), Chair of the Intercollegiate Athletics Committee (2007–), and is a member of the University Athletics Diversity Committee (2016–). He was the Chair of Institutional Compliance Committee (2007–2016) and is a member of the executive committee of the Southeastern Conference (2014–; Secretary 2017–).

His memberships include the Phi Kappa Phi Honor Society, the National Association of Scholars, the editorial boards of The Gaming Law Review and Economics and Cluny Media, the Society of Catholic Social Scientists (Board of Directors 2009–), the Fellowship of Catholic Scholars, the Catholic Association of Scientists and Engineers (2010–), the International Masters of Gaming Law, the Catholic League for Religious and Civil Rights (Board of Advisors, 2007–), Rychlak is on the board of directors of the Southeastern Association of Law Schools (President, 2018–2019). He serves on the board of governors of Ave Maria School of Law (2011–).

Rychlak is an advisor to the Holy See's Permanent Observer Mission to the United Nations on various issues of international law.

He has been a panelist for The Washington Post's "On Faith" blog, a columnist for Crisis magazine online,

== Awards and honors ==
- 2019 Distinguished Research and Creative Achievement Award University of Mississippi.
- 2017 Ben Hardy Faculty Excellence Award University of Mississippi School of Law.
- 2013 Pius XI Award for Social Scholarship, Society of Catholic Social Scientists.
- 2007: Honoree, U.S. Holocaust Museum for his work with on inter-faith dialogue.
- 2006: Blessed Frederic Ozanam Award for Social Action, Society of Catholic Social Scientists.
