= Studies in Intelligence =

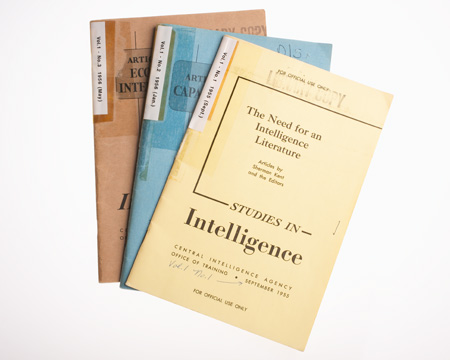
- Discipline: Intelligence gathering
- Language: English
- Edited by: Andres Vaart

Publication details
- History: 1955–present
- Publisher: Center for the Study of Intelligence (United States)
- Frequency: Quarterly

Standard abbreviations
- ISO 4: Stud. Intell.

Indexing
- ISSN: 1527-0874
- OCLC no.: 30965384

Links
- Journal homepage

Studies in Intelligence is a quarterly peer-reviewed academic journal on intelligence that is published by the Center for the Study of Intelligence, a group within the United States Central Intelligence Agency. It contains both classified and unclassified articles on the methodology and history of the field of intelligence gathering.

The journal was established by Sherman Kent in 1955. According to Kent, intelligence "has developed a recognized methodology; it has developed a vocabulary; it has developed a body of theory and doctrine; it has elaborate and refined techniques. It now has a large professional following. What it lacks is a literature.... The most important service that such a literature performs is the permanent recording of our new ideas and experiences."

Copies of unclassified and declassified articles from Studies in Intelligence are held at the National Archives' College Park, Maryland location as part of the Records of the Central Intelligence Agency (Record Group 263).
