= Victoria O'Donnell =

Victoria J. O'Donnell (February 12, 1938 – March 8, 2020) was an American professor in communication.

She earned her B.A. in 1959, her M.A. in 1961, and her PhD. in 1968, all from the Pennsylvania State University.

She was a professor and department chair of Communication Departments at the University of North Texas and Oregon State University and Professor of Communication and Director of the University Honors Program for 12 years at Montana State University-Bozeman.

== Major works ==
- Television Criticism
- Speech Communication (Ph.D. thesis)
- 1999: Propaganda and Persuasion (with Garth S. Jowett)
- 1992: Introduction to Public Communication
- 1982: Persuasion: An Interactive-dependency Approach (with June Kable)
- film, Women, War, and Work: Shaping Space for Productivity in the Shipyards During World War II, for PBS
