= Hilarius Breitinger =

German Franciscan administrator of Reichsgau Wartheland

Hilarius Breitinger, OFM Conv (7 June 1907 – 23 August 1994) was a German Franciscan prelate made apostolic administrator of the Reichsgau Wartheland during World War II by Pope Pius XII, one of the most controversial examples of the reorganization of occupied dioceses during World War II. Breitinger's appointment and those like it were the justification of the Polish Provisional Government for declaring the Concordat of 1925 "null and void" in 1945.

== Early life ==
Breitinger was born as Lorenz Breitinger on 7 June 1907 in Glattbach near Aschaffenburg. His parents were Martin, a carpenter, and Barbara Breitinger. He decided to study theology and enter the Order of Friars Minor ("Franciscans") after high school. He was ordained in 1932.

According to Phayer, Breitinger is the "key to unraveling" the contradictory accounts of Catholicism in Poland between Poles of German ethnicity (Nazi term Volksdeutsche) and those of Polish ethnicity. At the invitation of Primate Hlond, Breitinger (a German expatriate of Franconian descent) entered Poland in 1934 and began administering to Poles of German ethnicity in Poznań's church of St. Anthony of Padua, under the authority of the Bundestreffen der Landsmannschaft Weichsel-Warthe (LWW) as a pastor at a local Franciscan church. Breitinger wrote in a letter to Pius XII that he "did not like" pastoral work. While a pastor, Breitinger learned the Polish language.

After the German invasion of Poland, Breitinger was arrested on September 1, 1939 and asked to report to local police as "formality". Instead, Breitinger, the German expatriate, and Volksdeutsche were led around the countryside in a "three-week life-threatening ordeal". Forced to undergo a gamut of verbal and physical abuse, Breitinger was at one point hit in the head with a brick which he later theorized would have been fatal if not for his glasses. Some of his fellow captives succumbed to the ordeal or were murdered. Eventually, Breitinger was abandoned as the vigilantes found themselves between the retreating Polish and advancing German armies.

When the German army came upon Breitinger and the Volksdeutsche they sang "Deutschland, Deutschland über Alles'", the German national anthem. Similar accounts of abuse of Volksdeutsche, especially ethnic German priests, are common during this period, and Breitinger's story comports in large part to that of August Rauhut. However, for the next four years, Poland's 1.5 million Volksdeutsche "could literally cash in on the cruelties that the German occupational authorities heaped upon their Polish neighbors", until Polish and Soviet forces ended the German occupation. During this period, Breitinger came to regard Polish Catholicism as "superficial" as—in his letters—he tried to explain how "all this was possible in a Catholic country". However, Breitinger's formerly "disenchanted" opinion of Pius XII reversed in 1943 when he wrote that the pope's "heroic silence" would "create the foundation for a new peaceful order in the world".

== Assistant to Paech ==
A map of Nazi Germany showing the Wartheland

In 1941, Pius XII appointed Poznań's Capitular vicar Joseph Paech (1880–1942), a Pole of German ethnicity, as apostolic administrator to the Catholic faithful of German language within Reichsgau Wartheland. Breitinger was Paech's right-hand assistant, who took part in the negotiations with the Reichsgau. Heart disease forced Paech to retire from the post in 1942, and Breitinger was appointed as his successor on May 2, 1942. For the Catholic parishioners of Polish language in Wartheland Cesare Orsenigo appointed Poznań's Auxiliary Bishop Walenty Dymek as apostolic administrator on 9 April 1942, however, in August the same year he declared his resignation due to the German obstruction and violence.

== Administrator to the Wartheland ==
In May 1942, Pius XII made Breitinger apostolic administrator to Catholics of German language in the Reichsgau Wartheland, a portion of Poland annexed into Nazi Germany. Though this action fell short of the German demand that a new German church administration be created for the occupied territories (subject to the terms of the Reichskonkordat, which would have given Nazi Germany a voice in appointments), "betrayal was exactly what the Poles felt". Breitinger was nominally responsible for the spiritual well-being of German Catholics living in Poland. Breitinger was the recommendation of Cesare Orsenigo, the nuncio to Germany. After Cardinal August Hlond, the Primate of Poland, was forced to flee, Breitinger assisted Bishop Dymek, whom Hlond had appointed vicar general of Poznań, in the administration of the Diocese of Gnesen-Posen (the diocese of the primate).

Breitinger was, however, more sympathetic to the condition of Polish Catholics than Cesare Orsenigo, the nuncio to Berlin (with his authority extended to Poland). For example, when relaying a letter critical of the Pope's silence on the condition of Poland to Orsenigo, he also gave a second copy to Bishop Michael von Faulhaber (correctly) trusting only the second to deliver the letter to Rome. Breitinger's second correspondence to Rome in 1942, he reported that unlike in Reichsgau Danzig-West Prussia, another Nazi Gau comprising also annexed Polish area, in Arthur Greiser's Nazi prototype region of Wartheland Volksdeutsche Catholics were pressured to "drop their affiliation with the church" to secure advancement and the other fruits of the occupation, while Polish Catholics were treated far more harshly.

Many members of the Polish Catholic hierarchy and the Polish government-in-exile regarded the appointment of Breitinger and other German bishops to Polish territory as a violation of the Concordat of 1925. However, Bishop Dymek, and Gniezno's Cathedral Capitular Eduard van Blericq, whom Hlond had appointed vicar general for Gniezno, had pleaded to comply Greiser's policy of ethnic segregation in order to prevent him suppressing any church life. For example, in September 1942, the exiled Bishop Karol Mieczyslaw Radonski wrote two letters to Rome protesting these appointments which—in his view—"signaled the Vatican's willingness to let Hitler have the northwest sector of Poland that he had incorporated into his Greater Reich". Radonski criticized Pius XII directly: "et Papa tacet, tamquamsi nihil eum interesset de ovibus" ("and the pope keeps quiet as though these matters are of no interest to him"). The appointment of Breitinger and other German prelates was the pretext of the Polish Provisional Government for declaring the Concordat "null and void" in 1945.

== Return to Germany ==
As the Red Army advanced, Breitinger fled Poland in 1944, returning to his Franciscan order in Germany. In 1947 he became the Guardian of the Franciscan monastery of Würzburg, transferring to the Upper Bavarian monastery of Maria Eck in 1953, and to a Vienna seminary and hospital chaplaincy in 1959. In 1964, he was elected the provincial leader of the Austrian Franciscans monasteries.

In 1972 he returned to the Guardian of the Graz monastery and the pastor of Graz-Mariahilf. In 1978, he returned to Maria Eck in Upper Bavaria. In Maria Eck, he began to write his memoirs, published in 1984. In 1992, Pope John Paul II gave a special blessing to Breitinger on his birthday, expressing his "appreciation of his tireless pastoral ministry and apostolic ministry deserving as Apostolic Administrator of German Catholics in the Warta". Breitinger died on August 23, 1994.

== Works by Breitinger ==
- 1984. Als Deutschenseelsorger in Posen und im Warthegau 1934–1945: Erinnerungen. Mainz: Grünewald.

== Notes ==
Catholic Church titles
Preceded by Joseph Paech	Apostolic Administrator to the Reichsgau Wartheland; 1942 – 1944	Succeeded by none
