= Apostolic Nunciature to Poland =

Diplomatic post of the Holy See

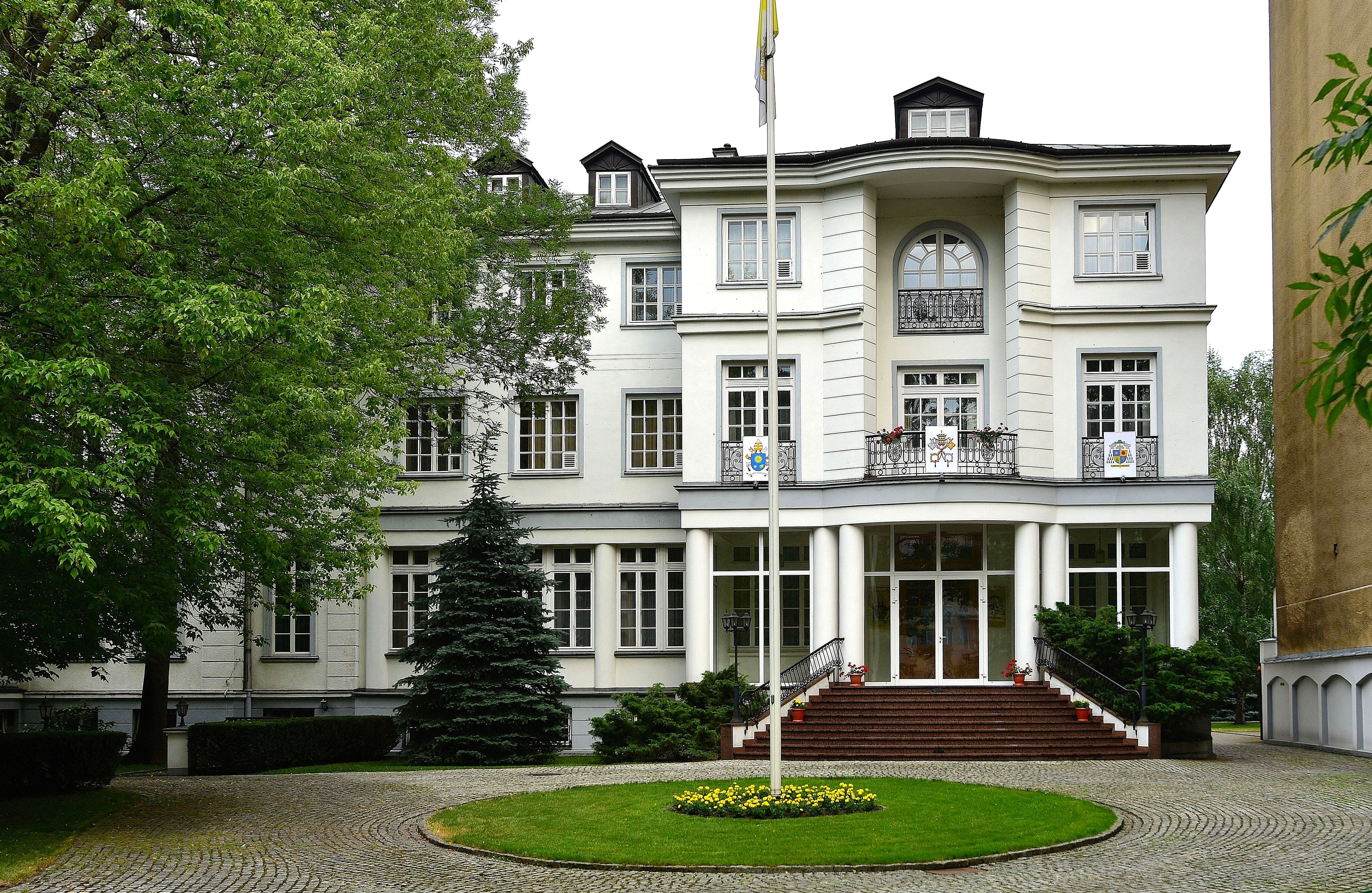
- Location: Warsaw
- Address: al. Jana Chrystiana Szucha 12 00-582 Warszawa
- Apostolic Nuncio: Antonio Guido Filipazzi
- Website: https://nuncjatura.pl/en/

The Apostolic Nuncio to Poland is one of the oldest nuncios, appointed by the Pope as apostolic representative to the Roman Catholic Church in Poland. Three nuncios to Poland went on to be elected pope. Three were cardinals at the time of their appointment as nuncio, and the rest—with the sole exception of Filippo Cortesi—were elevated afterwards.

== List ==
=== To the Kingdom of Poland ===
- Luigi Lippomano (1555-1557)
- Camillo Mentovato (1558-1560)
- Berardo Bongiovanni (1560–1563)
- Giovanni Francesco Commendone (September 1563-December 1565)
- Giulio Ruggiero (March 1566 - February 1568)

=== To the Polish-Lithuanian Commonwealth ===
- Vincenzo Portico (February 1568 - 1573)
- Vincenzo Lauro (June 1, 1573 – April 9, 1578)
- Giovanni Andrea Caligari (April 9, 1578 - April 12, 1581)
- Alberto Bolognetti (Alberto Bolognetto) (April 12, 1581-February 1585)
- Gerolamo Vitale de Buoi (27 Oct 1585 - Feb 1587 Resigned)
- Annibale di Capua (15 Nov 1587 - May 1591 Resigned)
- Nicolò Mascardi (1591 - 1592)
- Germanico Malaspina (6 June 1592 - 1598 Resigned)
- Claudio Rangoni (bishop of Reggio Emilia) (20 Oct 1598 - 16 Sep 1606 Resigned)
- Francesco Simonetta (16 Sep 1606 - 19 Jan 1612 Died)
- Lelio Ruini (13 Sep 1612 - Sep 1614 Resigned)
- Francesco Diotallevi (25 Aug 1614 - 1621 Resigned)
- Cosimo de Torres (21 May 1621 - 2 Dec 1622 Resigned)
- Giambattista Lancellotti (2 Dec 1622 - 1627 Resigned)
- Antonio Santacroce (16 Apr 1627 - 10 Mar 1631 Appointed, Archbishop of Chieti)
- Onorato Visconti (15 June 1630 - 12 April 1635 Resigned)
- Mario Filonardi (15 Mar 1635 - 19 Aug 1644 Died)
- Giovanni de Torres (February 16, 1645 - 1652)
- Pietro Vidoni (May 28, 1652 – April 5, 1660)
- Antonio Pignatelli, future Pope Innocent XII (May 21, 1660-March 1668)
- Galeazzo Marescotti (March 10, 1668 – August 13, 1670)
- Francesco Nerli (iuniore) (June 27, 1670 – December 22, 1670)
- Angelo Maria Ranuzzi (May 13, 1671 – 1673)
- Francesco Buonvisi (July 20, 1673 – July 28, 1675)
- Francesco Martelli (September 20, 1675-?)
- Opizio Pallavicini (September 30, 1680 – September 2, 1686)
- Giacomo Cantelmi (October 23, 1688 – 1689)
- Andrea Santacroce (January 7, 1690-?)
- Gianantonio Davia (February 2, 1696 – March 10, 1698)
- Michelangelo Conti, future Pope Innocent XIII (March 24, 1698-?)
- Francesco Pignatelli (March 20, 1700 – February 19, 1703)
- Orazio Filippo Spada (November 17, 1703 – December 15, 1704)
- Giulio Piazza (July 15, 1706 – December 15, 1709)
- Nicola Gaetano Spinola (September 6, 1707-circa 1715)
- Vincenzo Bichi (September 14, 1709-circa 1712)
- Benedetto Odescalchi-Erba (January 25, 1712 – October 5, 1712)
- Girolamo Grimaldi (December 20, 1712 – 1719/20)
- Girolamo Archinto (21 November 1720 - 1 October 1721)
- Vincenzo Santini (19 November 1721 - July 1728)
- Camillo Paolucci (2 August 1728 - 20 May 1738)
- Fabrizio Serbelloni (8 August 1738 - 1 March 1746)
- Alberico Archinto (1746 – 1754)
- Niccolò Serra (1754 – 1760)
- Antonio Eugenio Visconti (22 February 1760 – 22 November 1766)
- Angelo Maria Durini (16 January 1767 - 1772)
- Giuseppe Garampi (20 March 1772 - 16 March 1776)
- Giovanni Andrea Archetti (18 September 1775 - 27 June 1785)
- Ferdinando Maria Saluzzo (30 July 1784 - 14 March 1794)
- Lorenzo Litta (13 April 1794 - 11 February 1797)

=== To the Second Republic ===
- Achille Ratti, future Pope Pius XI (July 3, 1919 – June 13, 1921)
- Lorenzo Lauri (May 25, 1921 – December 20, 1926)
- Francesco Marmaggi (February 13, 1928 – December 16, 1935)
- Filippo Cortesi (December 24, 1936 – February 1, 1947)
  - Cesare Orsenigo, nuncio to Germany, had his authority formally extended to Poland on November 1, 1939, due to the exile of Cortesi.
  - Alfredo Pacini, chargé d'affaires to the Polish government-in-exile in Paris until 1940
  - William Godfrey, chargé d'affaires to the government-in-exile in London from 1940

=== Apostolic Delegates to the Polish People's Republic ===
The Polish Provisional Government declared the Concordat of 1925 null and void in 1945 due to what they perceived as its wartime abrogation. No proper Apostolic Nuncio was appointed between 1947 and 1989. Until 1972, the Holy See continued to recognize the London-based Polish government-in-exile as the legal authorities of Poland and to accredit its ambassadors. After Vatican's recognition of the Warsaw-based authorities, two Apostolic Delegates were consecutively appointed, although without the diplomatic privileges:

- Luigi Poggi (7 February 1975 – 19 April 1986)
- Francesco Colasuonno (9 April 1986 – 15 March 1990)

=== To the Third Republic (modern Poland) ===
- Józef Kowalczyk (26 August 1989 – 8 May 2010)
- Celestino Migliore (30 June 2010 – 28 May 2016)
- Salvatore Pennacchio (6 August 2016 – 25 January 2023)
- Antonio Guido Filipazzi (8 August 2023 – present)

== See also ==
- Holy See–Poland relations
- Foreign relations of the Holy See
- List of diplomatic missions of the Holy See
