= Pope Pius XI and Poland =

The relationship between Pope Pius XI and Poland is often considered to have been good, as Church life in Poland flourished during his pontificate.

== Role as nuncio to Poland ==
Achille Ratti, already in Warsaw as his representative, was named papal nuncio by Pope Benedict XV. During the Bolshevik advance against Warsaw, he asked for worldwide public prayers for Poland. Nuncio Ratti was the only foreign diplomat to stay in the Polish capital. On June 11, 1921, he wrote to the Polish episcopate, warning against political misuses of spiritual power, urging again peaceful coexistence with neighbouring people, stating that “love of country has its limits in justice and obligations.” He sent nuncio Ratti to Silesia to act against potential political agitations of the Catholic clergy.

== Building bridges with the Soviet Union ==
Ratti, a scholar, intended to work for Poland and build bridges to the Soviet Union, hoping even to shed his blood for Russia. Pope Benedict XV needed him as a diplomat and not as a martyr and forbade any trip into the USSR although he was the official papal delegate for Russia. Therefore, he continued his contacts to Russia. This did not generate much sympathy for him within Poland at the time. He was asked to go. "While he tried honestly to show himself as a friend of Poland, Warsaw forced his departure, after his neutrality in Silesian voting was questioned" by Germans and Poles.

== Opposition from German nationalists ==
Nationalistic Germans objected to a Polish nuncio supervising elections, and Poles were upset because he curtailed agitating clergy. On November 20, when German Cardinal Adolf Bertram announced a papal ban on all political activities of clergymen, calls for Ratti's expulsion climaxed in Warsaw. Two year later, Achille Ratti became Pope Pius XI, shaping Vatican policies towards Poland with Pietro Gasparri and Eugenio Pacelli for the following thirty-six years. (1922-1958)

== Church life flourishes ==
During the pontificate of Pope Pius XI (1922-1939), Church life in Poland flourished: There were some anti-clerical groups opposing the new role of the Church especially in education, But numerous religious meetings and congresses, feasts and pilgrimages, many of which were accompanied by supportive letters from the Pontiff, took place.

== Activities of Cardinal Gasparri ==
Under the pontificate of Pope Pius XI, his Cardinal Secretary of State Pietro Gasparri with unusual candour expressed his views on the post-war order and the future of Poland: He told Ludwig von Pastor, that the Peace Treaty of Versailles will most certainly end in a new war, maybe even ten wars. He expressed his pleasure at the outcome of the Locarno treaty. However, the Polish Corridor continued to be a dark point in his estimation, requiring compromises. At the same time, he opined, Poland can only exist, if she works either with her neighbour in the East or West. Since the Soviet Union could not be relied upon, he considered it “outright stupid, to destroy bridges to the West. Poland will have to pay dearly later on, once Germany recuperates”.

== Relationship with foreign minister Beck ==
In the late thirties, Polish foreign minister Beck came to Rome and requested an audience with Pope Pius XI. The Pope refused to see him, because Beck lived in disorderly family relations. Pacelli pointed out, that a foreign minister, not a saint, was applying. The Pope insisted, even when the “Black Pope, Father General Wlodimir Ledóchowski intervened. He was respectfully told to be quiet. His distaste for some Polish politicians did not extend to the Polish people. Pope Pius XI had received many pilgrims and delegations and was most cordial. He was especially grateful for a Marian gift by the Polish Catholics, which he placed in the private Papal Chapel in Castel Gandolfo.

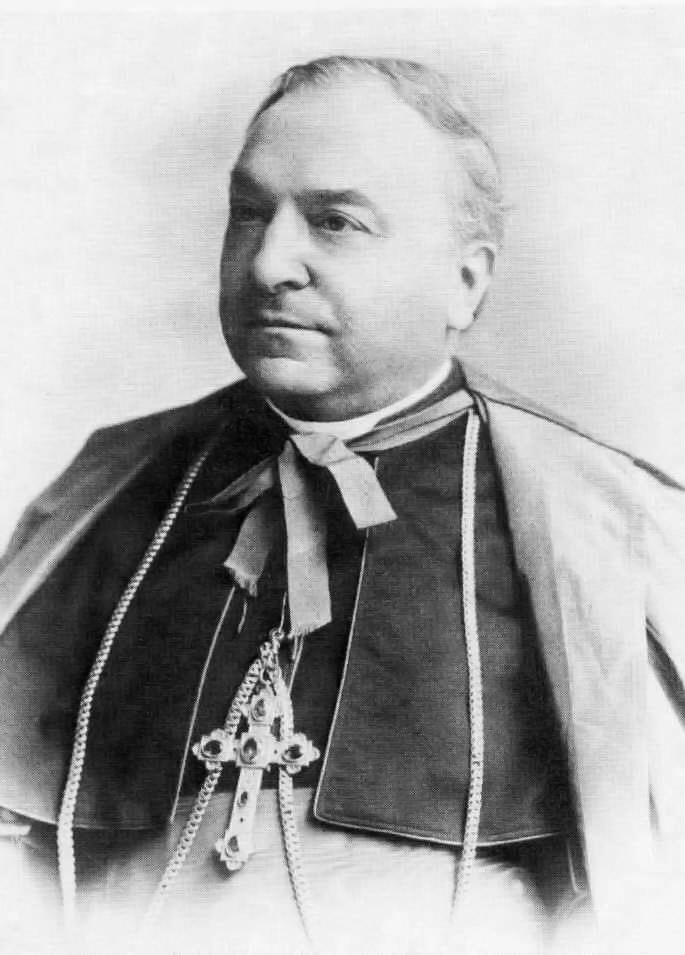
Cardinal Secretary of State Pietro Gasparri was in charge of Vatican foreign relations from 1914-1929. He negotiated for Pope Pius XI the Lateran Treaty of 1929 and numerous concordats.

== Concordat with Poland ==
On February 10, 1925, a concordat (Concordat of 1925) was signed between Pietro Gasparri, Cardinal Secretary of State for the Vatican and Stanislaw Grabski for Poland. The concordat has 27 articles, which guarantee the freedom of the Church and the faithful. It regulates the usual points of interests, Catholic instruction in primary schools and secondary schools, nomination of bishops, establishment of seminaries, a permanent nuncio in Warsaw, who also represents the interests of the Holy See in Gdańsk. The concordat stipulates, that no part of Polish territory can be placed under the jurisdiction of a bishop outside of Poland.

== Full protection of the State ==
The Church enjoys full protection of the State, and prays for the leaders of Poland during Sunday mass and on May Third. Clerics make a solemn oath of allegiance to the Polish State If clergy are under accusation, trial documents will be forwarded to ecclesiastical authorities if clergy are accused of crimes. If convicted, they will not serve incarceration in jails but will be handed over to Church authorities for internment in a monastery or convent. The concordat extends to the Latin rite in five ecclesiastical provinces of Gniezno and Poznan, Varsovie, Wilno, Lwow and Cracovie. It applies as well to united Catholics of the Greco-Ruthenian rite in Lwow, and Przemysl, and, to the Armenian rite in Lwow. for religious celebration in the specific rites, Canon law must be observed.

== Catholic instruction mandatory in public schools ==
Catholic instruction is mandatory in all public schools, except universities. In Article 24 Church and State recognize each other's property rights seeming in part from the time of partition before 1918. This means, property rights and real estate titles of the Church are respected, a later agreement will define the status of expropriated Church properties, until that time, the State will pay Church dotations for its clergy. On paper the concordat seemed to be a victory for the Church. But Polish bishops felt forced to take measures against early violations, in the area of marriage legislation and property rights. Pope Pius XI was supportive of this and of episcopal initiatives to have their own plenary meetings.
