= Cesare Orsenigo =

Roman Catholic archbishop (1873 – 1946)

His Excellency, The Most Reverend Cesare Orsenigo
- Apostolic Nuncio Emeritus of Germany; Titular Archbishop of Ptolemais
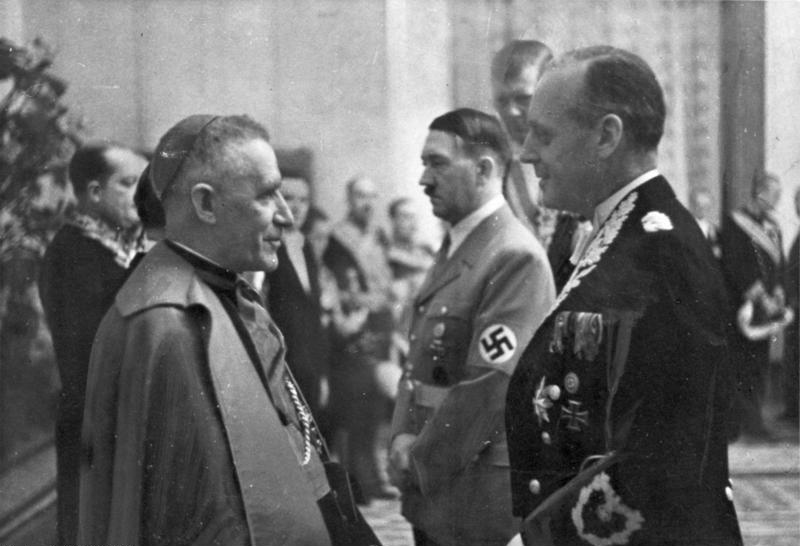
- Orsenigo with Hitler and Joachim von Ribbentrop, January 1939
- Church: Roman Catholic
- Appointed: 18 March 1930
- Term ended: May 1945
- Predecessor: Eugenio Pacelli
- Successor: Aloisius Joseph Muench (1951)
- Previous posts: Apostolic Nuncio to the Netherlands (1922–1925); Apostolic Nuncio to Hungary (1925–1930); Apostolic Nuncio to Prussia (1930–1934)

Orders
- Ordination: 1896 by Andrea Carlo Ferrari
- Consecration: 29 June 1922 by Pietro Gasparri

Personal details
- Born: Cesare Vincenzo Orsenigo; 13 December 1873 Villa San Carlo, Italy
- Died: 1 April 1946 (aged 72) Eichstätt, Germany
- Denomination: Roman Catholicism

Cesare Vincenzo Orsenigo (13 December 1873 – 1 April 1946) was an Italian prelate of the Catholic Church who served as Apostolic Nuncio to Germany from 1930 to 1945, during the rise of Nazi Germany and World War II. Along with the German ambassador to the Vatican, Diego von Bergen and later Ernst von Weizsäcker, Orsenigo was the direct diplomatic link between Pope Pius XI and Pope Pius XII and the Nazi regime, meeting several times with Adolf Hitler directly and frequently with other high-ranking officials and diplomats.

Orsenigo was close to Achille Ratti, the Archbishop of Milan, and was appointed to the Vatican diplomatic corps when Ratti was elected Pope Pius XI, as nuncio to the Netherlands (1922–1925), Hungary (1925–1930), and Germany (1930–1945).

Orsenigo believed in the Italian fascist ideal and hoped the German variety would develop into something similar. He was a controversial figure among his contemporaries and remains the subject of historical criticism for his advocacy of "compromise and conciliation" with the Nazis, particularly about The Holocaust. Several contemporaries and historians have criticized Pius XII for not replacing Orsenigo as nuncio. Pius XII left the nunciature vacant after Orsenigo died in 1946, and he appointed Aloisius Joseph Muench to the post in 1951.

== Early life and education ==
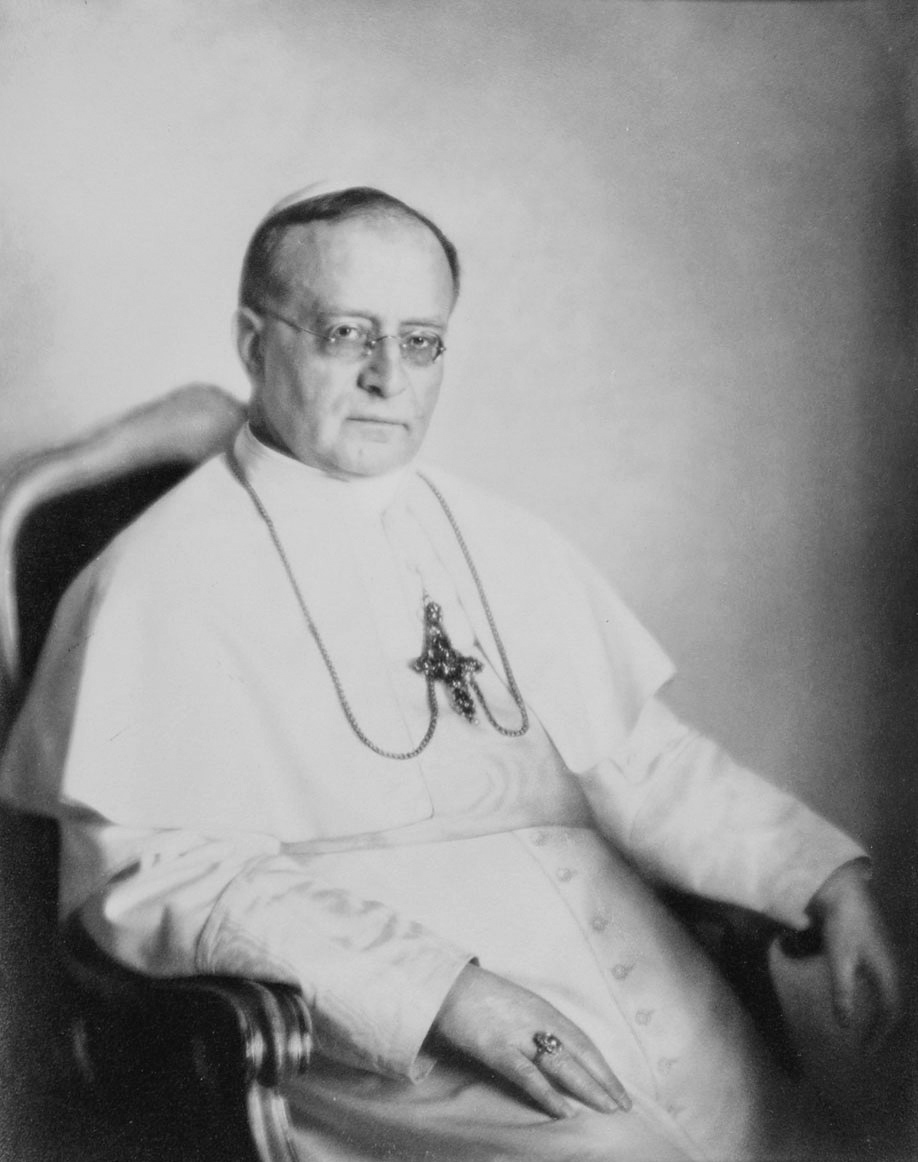
Pope Pius XI, a friend of Orsenigo in Milan who appointed him to all three of his nunciatures

Orsenigo was born in Olginate, Italy. He attended a seminary in Milan and was ordained in 1896. He became a priest at San Fedele in Milan, Ecclesiastical Censor, and Synodal Examiner. In 1912, at thirty-nine, he was appointed a canon of the cathedral of Milan. In August 1921, he was awarded Commander of the Order of the Crown of Italy for philanthropic work.

== Nuncio to the Netherlands (1922–1925) ==
After being elected as pope in 1922, Pius XI appointed Orsenigo as titular archbishop of Ptolemais and made him nuncio to the Netherlands, effective 23 June 1922. Orsengio, aged 49 at his appointment, had no formal diplomatic training, but rather had been a friend of Ratti in Milan. Pius overruled Orsenigo's objections that he lacked experience, noting that he had spent decades as a librarian before being appointed apostolic delegate to Poland. He received episcopal consecration on 29 June 1922 from Pietro Gasparri, then Camerlengo and Cardinal Secretary of State.

== Nuncio to Hungary (1925–1930) ==
On 2 June 1925 Orsenigo was named apostolic nuncio in Hungary.

== Nuncio to Germany ==
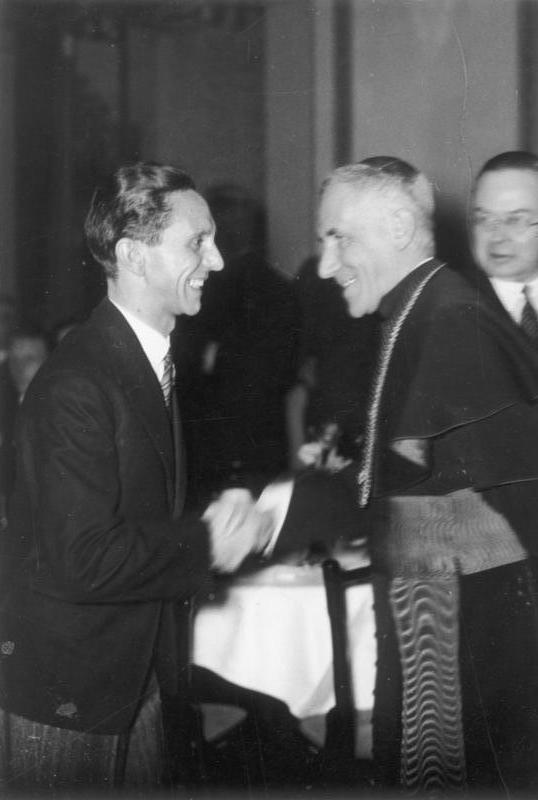
Orsenigo shaking hands with Joseph Goebbels

=== Under Pius XI (1930–1939) ===
On 25 April 1930, he became Apostolic Nuncio in Germany, a post previously held by Eugenio Pacelli (future Pope Pius XII), who had been appointed Cardinal. He received his confirmation letter from President Paul von Hindenburg. Orsenigo's nunciature was located in Berlin, although a separate nunciature existed in Munich due to its "peculiar status" dating back to 1871.

On 16 February 1933, Orsenigo wrote to Pacelli that it would be "ingenuous and incoherent" to support the newly elected Nazi government, but that he feared open opposition would lead to a new Kulturkampf. In a 7 March 1933 letter to Pacelli, Orsenigo estimated that six to seven million of Germany's thirteen million voting Catholics had supported the Nazi party. According to George Schuster, Orsenigo "was frankly jubilant" over the election of Hitler. As early as March 1933, Orsenigo concluded that compromise and conciliation was the only option, arguing that earlier condemnations of Nazism by German bishops had concerned only its religious, not political, tenets.

Following an 4 April 1933 transmission from Pope Pius XI to "look into whether and how it might be possible to become involved" in helping the victims of Nazi persecution, Orsenigo replied that any intervention would be seen as "a protest against that government's law" and thus not be advisable. Of the 95 documents from the Berlin nunciature in the Vatican Secret Archives from 1930 to 1938, only four contain references to Jews.

Writing on 8 May 1933 about an earlier conversation with Hitler, Orsenigo opined that Hitler saw Christianity as essential to private life and the German state and that without the cooperation of the Nazis the German Church could not hope to defeat liberalism, socialism, communism, anarchism and Bolshevism. Orsenigo reported that Hitler disagreed with the neo-pagan wing of the Nazi party, as represented in Alfred Rosenberg's The Myth of the Twentieth Century.

After the conclusion of the Reichskonkordat on July 20, 1933, Orsenigo urged German bishops to support the Nazi regime. For example, anti-Nazi bishop Maximilian Kaller complained that Orsenigo (who, Kaller assumed, spoke for the pope) "put the skids under me" by telling him to make amends with the Nazis. Orsenigo punished Bishop Clemens von Galen, who continued to publicly criticize the Nazi's euthanasia program, with a critical letter to Rome. Orsenigo soon began to report to the German Foreign Ministry with protest notes, which were regularly ignored by the German government, which continued with the introduction of restrictive measures against Catholics.

=== Under Pius XII (1939–1945) ===
Pius XII retained Orsenigo as nuncio to Germany; according to Phayer, the pope's priorities were the preservation of the Reichskonkordat specifically, and Vatican-German relations more generally. According to Phayer, "In Orsenigo, Pius had the right man for the job. A pro-German, pro-Nazi, antisemitic fascist, Orsenigo would have no trouble adjusting to the Nazi regime in Berlin. In addition, Orsenigo, who hankered after the cardinal's hat, could be trusted not to interfere with Pius's well-known intention to deal with Germany himself." In 1937 he had an important role in secretly sending to all the bishops the encyclical of denunciation of the Nazism of Pius XI Mit brennender Sorge. On the orders of Pius XII, Orsenigo warmly and publicly congratulated Hitler on 20 April 1939, the Führer's fiftieth birthday.

On 4 May 1939, Orsenigo visited Adolf Hitler in Obersalzberg; Orsenigo was flown to Salzburg and had lunch at the Grand Hotel in Berchtesgaden before being transported to Hitler's residence, where the two spoke privately for an hour before having tea with von Ribbentrop and his aide V. Hewel (who also wrote an account of the meeting). In a 1940 note to Pius XII, Orsenigo again argued in favor of conciliation, stating his fears of lapsed religiosity among German Catholics unless the clergy appeased the regime and relieved members of the Church of a conflict of conscience.

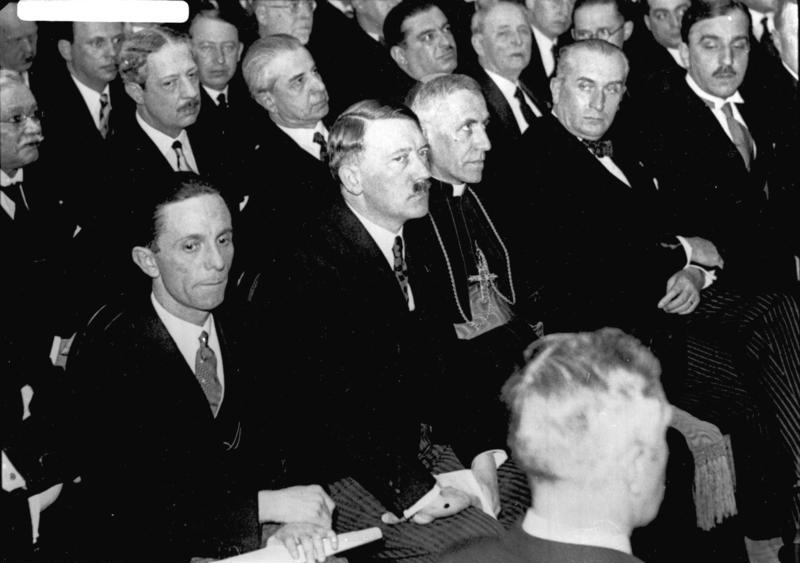
Goebbels, Hitler, Orsenigo, and Italian ambassador Vittorio Cerruti at a reception for foreign press in Berlin

On 21 June 1942, he was a consecrator at the Cologne Cathedral for the inauguration of the new archbishop in Cologne, Joseph Frings. In November 1943, he again met with Hitler on behalf of Pius XII. According to Orsenigo's account:

"As soon as I touched upon the question of Jews and Judaism, the serenity of the meeting ended at once. Hitler turned his back on me, went to the window and started drumming his fingers on the pane [...] Still, I went on, voicing our complaints. Hitler suddenly turned around, went to a small table, took a water glass and furiously smashed it on the floor. In the face of such diplomatic behaviour, I had to consider my mission terminated".

==== The Holocaust ====
Orsenigo, as nuncio, routinely refused to intervene on behalf of Jews and more often than not failed to forward to Rome reports descriptive or critical of the Holocaust. A rare exception, was the Nazi plan to "resettle" Jews married to Christians, although Phayer argues that his concern was primarily with their Catholic spouses. According to Phayer, "when the Holy See directed the nuncio to discuss incidents concerning Jewish victims with Nazi officials, he did so timidly and with embarrassment."

In 1941, Orsenigo was contacted by Kurt Gerstein, a Protestant SS officer who had personally witnessed the extermination of Jews and wished to notify the Vatican. Informed of the purpose of Gerstein's visit, Orsenigo refused to meet with him. Gerstein's message was eventually sent to the Vatican by the auxiliary bishop of Berlin, not the nuncio's office, where the information reached a "dead end."

Netherlands

Both the Catholic and Protestant Churches in the Netherlands were vocal in their protests against the deportation of the Dutch Jewry. However, the mainline Protestant Church eventually turned silent based on Nazi promises that doing such would save further "Jews" of their denomination from deportation. Orsenigo sent word to the Vatican that the protest of the Church had caused the Dutch deportations to end, even though precisely the opposite had occurred, and seizures, murders, and deportations of Catholics of Jewish heritage increased.

Poland

Because Germany would not allow Pius XII to appoint a nuncio to occupied Poland, Orsenigo also fulfilled that role. On 1 November 1939, Orsenigo's authority was formally extended to Poland. A 25 November 1939 dispatch from Orsenigo prompted Pius XII to make "one of his most controversial decisions." Orsenigo informed the Pope of the situation in the diocese of Chełmno-Pelpin: the bishop, Stanisław Wojciech Okoniewski, was in exile; his auxiliary was ill; all but one canon was absent; only 20 of the 500 priests of the diocese had not been forced out, imprisoned, or murdered. Pius XII, therefore, reversed his decision not to replace Polish prelates with (even temporary) German ones, naming Karl Maria Splett, the bishop of Danzig, also apostolic administrator of Chełmno-Pelpin. This decision was seen as a betrayal by the Polish government-in-exile, as the Concordat of 1925 prohibited placing any Polish territory under the jurisdiction of a bishop outside Poland.

In August 1940, Orsenigo indeed launched a private protest with the German government, listing a variety of abuses against the Polish Church; this had no noticeable effect. Bishop Adam Stefan Sapieha of Cracow wrote to Orsenigo, telling him that a direct protest by the Pope (rather than the nuncio) was "indispensable". Phayer finds it "doubtful" that Orsenigo forwarded Sapieha's request to the Holy See.

Among Polish Catholics, there was a widespread perception that Orsenigo "purposefully minimized their situation in his reports to Rome." For example, Hilarius Breitinger, the apostolic administrator of Warthegau, delivered two copies of a letter critical of the Pope's silence towards Berlin concerning the situation in Poland: one to Orsenigo and another to Cardinal Michael von Faulhaber, only the latter of whom assured Breitinger they would deliver the letter.

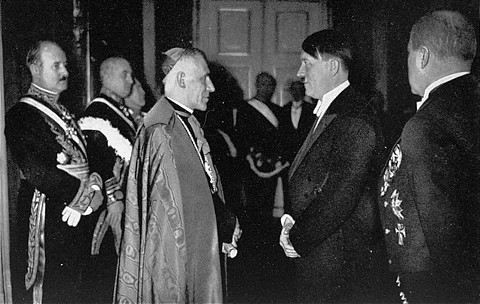
Hitler with Orsenigo in 1935

=== German espionage ===
The RSHA infiltrated the Berlin nunciature through a German priest who served under Orsenigo as adviser on German and eastern European affairs. According to Alvarez and Graham, this espionage provides "access to the attitudes and intentions of the nuncio." Orsenigo's primary priest-assistant was a secret member of the Nazi party. It is unknown whether Orsenigo was aware of his assistant's party membership; however, this fact was certainly known by Robert Leiber, a German Jesuit who served as one of Pius XII's closest confidants and advisers during the war.

On 8 February 1945, after the destruction of the Nunciature due to a bombing, Orsenigo moved to Eichstätt, in Bavaria. The nunciature lost its official status in May 1945, with the defeat of Nazi Germany, although the Allied Control Council allowed Orsenigo to remain in Eichstätt. After the war, he directed the Pontifical Mission, which dealt with repatriating Italian prisoners. Orsenigo died in Eichstätt on 1 April 1946, leaving his aide de camp, Monsignor Carlo Colli, as the only remaining link between Pius XII and the German Church. Colli died in January 1947, leaving his secretary, Monsignor Bernard Hack, alone in Eichstätt. After a lengthy interregnum, during which Pius XII relied on Father Igo Ziegler at the Villa Grosch in Kronberg, the next nuncio would be Aloisius Joseph Muench.

== Legacy ==
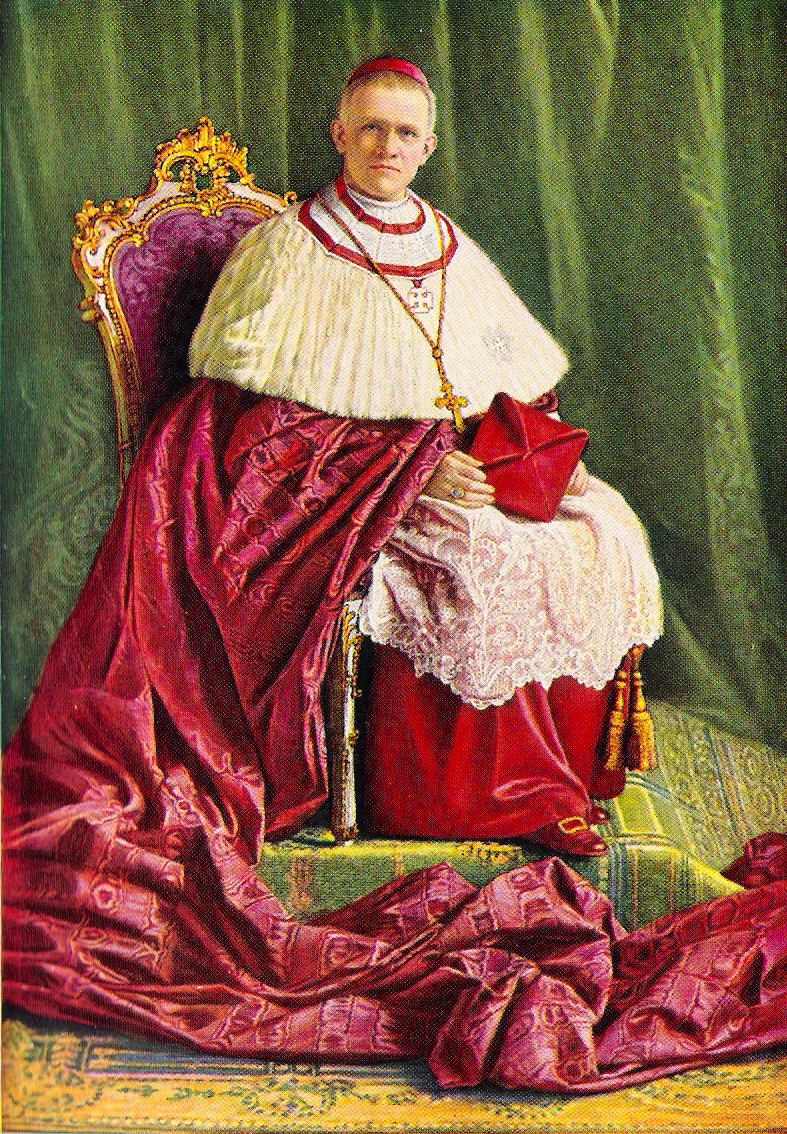
Cardinal Theodor Innitzer was among the contemporary critics of Orsenigo.

Prof. Jose Sánchez states, "a chief point of criticism of Pope Pius XII is his unwillingness to replace Cesare Orsenigo as his nuncio to Berlin." The Vatican received many contemporary complaints about Orsenigo as nuncio; for example, Cardinal Theodor Innitzer, the Archbishop of Vienna, wrote to Cardinal Secretary of State Luigi Maglione in 1939, stating that Orsenigo was too timid and ineffectual. The German episcopate was divided on Orsenigo; Bishop Konrad von Preysing wrote a letter to the Vatican in 1937 calling Orsenigo too sympathetic with the Nazis, but Cardinal Adolf Bertram, the chairman of the German Bishops Conference, wrote a letter of praise recommending that Orsenigo be allowed to stay. Von Preysing had a history of correspondence with Orsenigo, but became frustrated upon receiving the following response: "Charity is well and good, but the greatest charity is not to make problems for the church."

Owen Chadwick argues that "the Pope knew how weak with the Nazis [Orsenigo] was." Phayer and Morley also criticize Pius XII for leaving Orsenigo at one of his most important nunciatures. However, Pierre Blet argues that had Orsenigo been replaced, the Nazis may not have accepted a new nuncio and the Vatican would have lost communication with the German Church.

Susan Zuccotti argues that Orsenigo was "never known for his imagination or daring." Chadwick states that "Orsenigo saw nothing but ill to come from a breach between the Church and a Nazi State. As an Italian, he believed in the Fascist State. His ideas on what ought to happen in Germany were formed based on what happened in Italy." Chadwick credits Orsenigo with the creation of a chaplain-general for the German army, the circulation of pastoral letters from German bishops on pro-Nazi subjects such as mass procreation.

== Notes ==
Catholic Church titles
| Preceded by Giovanni Tacci Porcelli as internuncio | Nuncio to the Netherlands; 23 June 1922 – 2 June 1925 | Succeeded by Paolo Giobbe |
| Preceded by Lorenzo Schioppa | Nuncio to Hungary; 2 June 1925 – 18 March 1930 | Succeeded by Angelo Rotta |
| Preceded by Eugenio Pacelli | Nuncio to Germany and Nuncio to Prussia; 18 March 1930 – 1945 | Succeeded by Aloisius Joseph Muench |
