= Apostolic Nunciature to Prussia =

Diplomatic Mission of the Holy See in Prussia

The Apostolic Nunciature to Prussia provided representation on behalf of the Holy See to the Free State of Prussia. It was based in Berlin.

== History ==
Pope Pius XI established the Apostolic Nunciature in Berlin in 1925 at the request of the Weimar Republic, which sought to grant greater diplomatic recognition and visibility to Berlin’s Catholic population within a predominantly Protestant political landscape. The creation of such a nunciature had been contemplated since the 1871 constitution of the German Empire, but its realization was long delayed. Strong Protestant influence within the imperial government, the political dominance of the Prussian monarchy and later the German emperors, uncertainty within the Holy See regarding the prudence of establishing a permanent diplomatic presence in Berlin, and resistance from Austria all contributed to postponement. Before 1925, the Holy See maintained separate nunciatures to Bavaria and to Germany, often entrusted to the same diplomat. Notably, Eugenio Pacelli—later Pope Pius XII—served as nuncio to Bavaria from 1917 and subsequently became the first Apostolic Nuncio to Germany in Berlin in 1925.

The creation of the Berlin nunciature mirrored the Holy See's wider endeavors to establish and formalize diplomatic ties with contemporary European nations following the First World War. The Weimar Constitution of 1919 enshrined religious liberty, and the Catholic Church's political clout, especially via the Centre Party (Zentrum), exerted considerable influence within the parliamentary system. Consequently, diplomatic relations between the Holy See and Germany became increasingly concentrated in Berlin, reflecting the political reorganization of the republic.

After the Nazi seized power in 1933, relations between the Holy See and Germany were reshaped by the signing of the Reichskonkordat in July 1933, an agreement intended to protect the rights of the Catholic Church within the Third Reich. However, the Nazi regime soon violated many of its provisions. On 30 January 1934, the federal structure of the German states was effectively abolished through the process of Gleichschaltung (“coordination”), consolidating authority under the central Reich government. As a consequence, the separate diplomatic arrangements connected to the former federal states were terminated, and the distinct nunciature in Berlin was closed, with diplomatic relations thereafter conducted under the new political framework of the Nazi regime.

== Nuncios ==
- 1925–19 August 1929 - Eugenio Pacelli (later Pope Pius XII)
  - also apostolic nuncio to Bavaria (1917 to 24 January 1925) and to Germany (1920-1929)
- 1930–31 May 1934 - Cesare Orsenigo
  - also apostolic nuncio to Germany (1930-1945)
