= Diego von Bergen =

German diplomat and jurist

Baron von Bergen

Carl-Ludwig Diego von Bergen (1872 – 7 October 1944) was the ambassador to the Holy See from the Kingdom of Prussia (1915–1918), the Weimar Republic (1920–1933), and Nazi Germany (1933–1943), most notably during the negotiation of the Reichskonkordat and during the Second World War.

From 1930 to 1943, by virtue of seniority, Bergen was also the doyen of the diplomatic corps accredited to the Holy See. This office entitled him to speak at the funeral of Pope Pius XI in 1939, when he urged the cardinals to elect a new pope who would work with the fascist governments of Europe to build "a new world upon the ruins of a past that in many things has no longer any reason to exist". Bergen was recalled in 1943, aged more than seventy, which was a good deal more than the mandatory retirement age for German diplomats, and was replaced by Ernst von Weizsäcker.

== Early life ==
Diego von Bergen was born in Siam in 1872, the son of a German diplomat, Werner von Bergen, and a Spanish mother, Isabel Maria de las Mercedes Alcala. The young Bergen attended a Roman Catholic school in Roßleben and then the University of Berlin. He first entered the German diplomatic corps in 1895 as legation secretary at Peking, remaining in China during the Boxer Rebellion. He also held diplomatic posts in Brussels and Madrid before going to Rome. According to a New York Times obituary, "a man of considerable culture, a fluent linguist, he was said to have never been in sympathy with the Weimar Republic and to have been an early adherent to the National Socialist Regime."

== Ambassador to the Holy See ==
Bergen was first accredited to the Holy See in 1915 as a Minister from the Kingdom of Prussia, then the largest state of the German Empire. On 1 April 1919 Matthias Erzberger persuaded the new German Republic to "restore the Prussian legation to the Holy See", the only diplomatic appointment that year. Bergen was a friend of Erzberger's in the Foreign Office. On 27 September the Foreign Minister Hermann Müller informed the Reichstag Committee on Foreign Affairs of the establishment of a German embassy to the Vatican. The takeover of the legation had been requested by Prussia and attained the concurrence of the Curia. According to Scholder, "thus the transformation of the Prussian legation into an embassy of the Reich as had happened once before, in 1871, had probably been envisaged from the start". Bergen was announced as German ambassador to the Vatican on 24 April 1920.

Erzberger was an advocate of a concordat between Germany and the Holy See, and announced his intentions at an end-of-year banquet in honor of the nuncio; Erzberger advocated negotiations to be conducted by all the States of Germany in concert, "under the leadership of the Reich". Bavarian Nuncio Eugenio Pacelli (the future Pope Pius XII) preferred to conclude a separate concordat with Bavaria, and Joseph Wirth instructed Bergen to "work for a change in the Nuncio's position. But this was just as futile as all other attempts to change the Nuncio's mind on this point".

Bergen twice refused the office of Foreign Minister of Germany because he preferred to stay in Rome. He became the senior ambassador in Rome in 1930, and thus was the doyen of the diplomatic corps. Bergen's counsellor, Menschausen, would act on his behalf when he was ill. Menschausen was also named chargé d'affaires after Bergen was temporarily withdrawn on 2 June 1937 (this move was echoed by the temporary withdrawing of Cesare Orsenigo, nuncio to Berlin, and replacing him with a chargé d'affaires) after American Cardinal George Mundelein had spoken publicly against Hitler. Bergen returned to his post on 29 June, after what was publicly described as a "vacation".

=== Election of Pius XII ===
Bergen visited Cardinal Secretary of State Pacelli on 28 September 1938 to discuss the Sudetenland crisis. As the dean of the diplomatic corps, Bergen delivered an address of sympathy on the death of Pope Pius XI. In the address, he urged the College of Cardinals to elect a successor who would assist Germany and their allies in building "a new world upon the ruins of a past that in many things has no longer any reason to exist".

Before the papal conclave, 1939, Bergen communicated with Pacelli, who related to him his preference for conciliation towards Nazi Germany. The four German cardinals decided to vote for Pacelli as the new Pope unless contrary orders reached Bergen by 28 February. Both Karl Joseph Schulte and Michael von Faulhaber promised as much to Bergen, who was confident that Adolf Bertram would follow their lead but unsure about what course of action Theodor Innitzer would undertake. Pacelli was elected, taking the name Pius XII, and Bergen met the newly elected pope on 5 March, three days after the end of the conclave.

=== Second World War ===
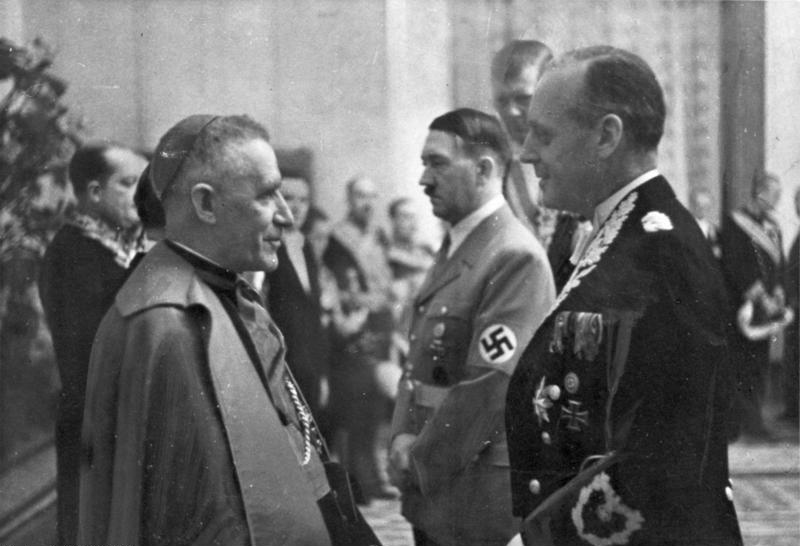
Bergen's counterpart in Berlin, Cesare Orsenigo (pictured with Hitler and Ribbentrop), was also doyen of the diplomatic corps.

On 8 March 1940 Bergen appeared in the Vatican for the first time in months to arrange an audience between Pius XII and Foreign Minister Joachim von Ribbentrop; Bergen was successful in this, and the meeting took place on 11 March. At the meeting, Ribbentrop offered to allow Cardinal August Hlond to return to Poland, which the New York Times reported as "the nearest approach to a temporal power's 'going to Canossa' that has been seen in recent times." The hour and five minute audience was reportedly of "an unprecedented length", and was followed by a forty-five-minute meeting with the new Cardinal Secretary of State Luigi Maglione, rather than the usual courtesy call with the Secretary. Maglione proceeded immediately afterwards to report to the pope.

On 13 January 1940 the New York Times reported that Bergen had been "transferred" and that Franz von Papen (a former Catholic Centre Party chancellor of Germany) had been put forward as a replacement, although the paper believed that "there are good reasons to believe that Herr von Papen would not be a persona grata". Bergen was reported as the ambassador again on 26 January, with no mention of Papen. On 13 March 1940 Germany named two new ministers to their embassy in Rome—Prince Otto Christian Archibald von Bismarck and Baron Johann von Plessen—with Bismarck expected to succeed Bergen, who was reported as ill. A list of diplomats accredited to the Vatican published in December 1940 lists Guido von Bergen as the doyen of the diplomatic corps, followed by thirteen other ambassadors and twenty three ministers, with Myron C. Taylor conspicuously in last place. When the pope received "many thousands" of holiday greetings that year, Bergen was accorded the honor of being the first to meet the pope.

Bergen also demanded on 29 August 1941 that "all ecclesiastical appointments to important posts in annexed or occupied regions be first communicated to Berlin". Bergen also was able to relay German complaints about Vatican Radio and obtained an assurance—which angered the British—that the station would stay away from politics. Bergen also assured his superiors in Berlin that the pope would not publicly condemn Nazi persecution and that "the pope's heart, they tell me, is always on the side of the Axis". Bergen occasionally relayed threats from Ribbentrop to the pope, but replied that "Pacelli is no more sensible to threats than we are". Bergen asked Pope Pius XII to prevent the bombing of Rome in September 1942, without asking or even informing his superiors in Berlin. Pius XII drew Bergen aside after his 1942 Christmas address and assured him that his criticisms were aimed at Stalin and Russia—not Germany.

=== Recall ===
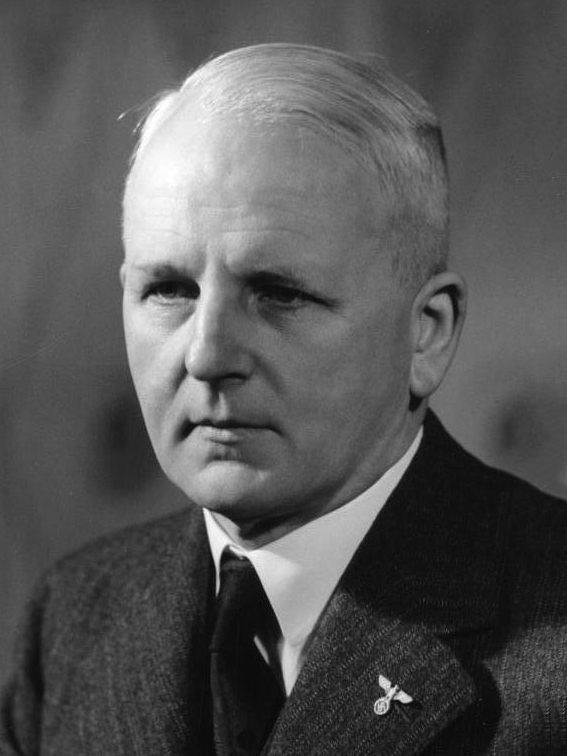
von Bergen's successor as ambassador, Ernst von Weizsäcker

Bergen was not viewed as sufficiently pro-Nazi and was marginalized for years before being forced from his post in 1943. He was recalled to Berlin on 27 February 1943 "for consultation", reportedly to protest against the Pope's "frivolous attitude" toward mediating the end of the war. Von Bergen was well past the official age limit for retirement at the time of his recall. In 1943, Bergen was replaced as ambassador by Ernst von Weizsäcker, the former secretary of state at the Foreign Office. Weizsäcker reported to Berlin after his first meeting with Pius XII that "hostility to Bolshevism is, in fact, the most stable component of Vatican foreign policy" and that the Vatican "detested" the link between the US and Soviet Russia—a message echoed by the departed Bergen.

== Death ==
Diego von Bergen died on 7 October 1944 in Wiesbaden, Germany; his death was announced ten days later in L'Osservatore Romano, in an obituary which called him "highly esteemed and unanimously liked". A few months later, in the final hours of the war in Europe, an "acre of ground" at Bergen's Wiesbaden residence was used by the German General Staff, including Field Marshal Karl von Rundstedt, to discuss how to proceed.

== Notes ==
Diplomatic posts
Preceded by	Prussian Minister to the Holy See; 1915-1918	Succeeded by none
Preceded by none	German Ambassador to the Holy See; 1920-1943	Succeeded by Ernst von Weizsäcker
