= Reichskonkordat =

Treaty negotiated between the Vatican and the emergent Nazi Germany

Concordat between the Holy See and the German Reich
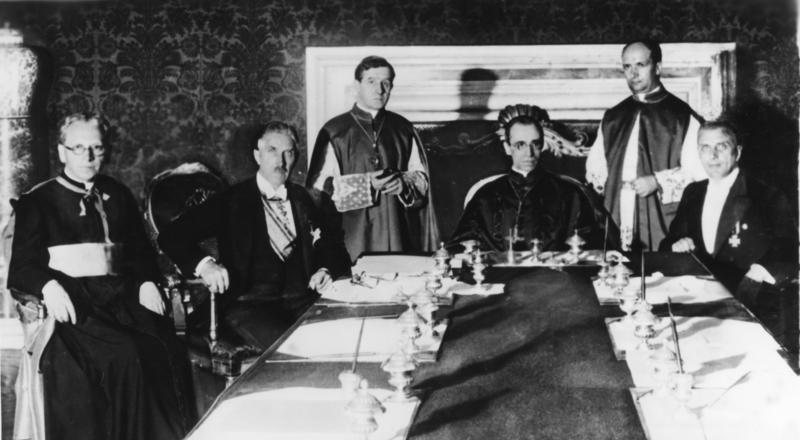
- The signing of the Reichskonkordat on 20 July 1933 in Rome (from left to right: German prelate Ludwig Kaas, German Vice-Chancellor Franz von Papen, Secretary of Extraordinary Ecclesiastical Affairs Giuseppe Pizzardo, Cardinal Secretary of State Eugenio Pacelli, Alfredo Ottaviani, and member of Reichsministerium des Inneren [Home Office] Rudolf Buttmann).
- Signed: 20 July 1933
- Effective: 10 September 1933
- Signatories: Eugenio Pacelli; Franz von Papen
- Parties: Holy See; (Nazi Germany) Germany

The Reichskonkordat ("Concordat between the Holy See and the German Reich") is a treaty negotiated between the Vatican and the emergent Nazi Germany. It was signed on 20 July 1933 by Cardinal Secretary of State Eugenio Pacelli, who later became Pope Pius XII, on behalf of Pope Pius XI; and by Vice Chancellor Franz von Papen on behalf of President Paul von Hindenburg and the German government. It was ratified on 10 September 1933 and it remains in force. The treaty guarantees the rights of the Catholic Church in Germany. When bishops take office, Article 16 states that they are required to take an oath of loyalty to the Governor or President of the German Reich established according to the constitution. The treaty also requires all clergy to abstain from working in and for political parties. Breaches of the agreement by the Nazis began soon after it was signed, and escalated throughout their rule. The Church protested, including in the 1937 Mit brennender Sorge encyclical of Pope Pius XI. The Nazis planned to eliminate the Church's influence by restricting its organizations to purely religious activities. The concordats were important because the great majority of German Nazis considered themselves Christian. A census in May 1939, six years into the Nazi era and a year following the annexations of Austria and Czechoslovakia into Germany, indicates that 54% and 41% of the population considered itself Protestant and Catholic, respectively.

The Reichskonkordat is the most controversial of several concordats that the Vatican negotiated during the pontificate of Pius XI. It is frequently discussed in works that deal with the rise of Adolf Hitler in the early 1930s and the Holocaust. The concordat was described by the Nazis as giving moral legitimacy to the Nazi regime after Hitler had acquired quasi-dictatorial powers through the Enabling Act of 1933, an Act itself facilitated through the support of the Catholic Centre Party.

The treaty places constraints on the political activity of German clergy of the Catholic Church. With passage of the 1935 Nuremberg Laws, for example, a policy of nonintervention was followed. The majority of the German church hierarchy regarded the treaty as a symbol of peace between church and state. From a Catholic Church perspective, it has been argued that the Concordat prevented even greater evils being unleashed against the Church. Though some German bishops were unenthusiastic, and the Allies at the end of World War II felt it inappropriate, Pope Pius XII successfully argued to keep the concordat in force. It is still in force.

== Background ==
The 'Reichskonkordat' between Germany and the Holy See was signed on 20 July 1933 and ratified in 10 September of that year. The treaty was an extension of existing concordats already signed with Prussia and Bavaria. Concordats have been used to create binding agreements to safeguard church interests and its freedom to act, particularly in countries that do not have strong jurisprudence guaranteeing government non-interference in religious matters or where the church seeks a privileged position under government patronage.

=== Kulturkampf ===
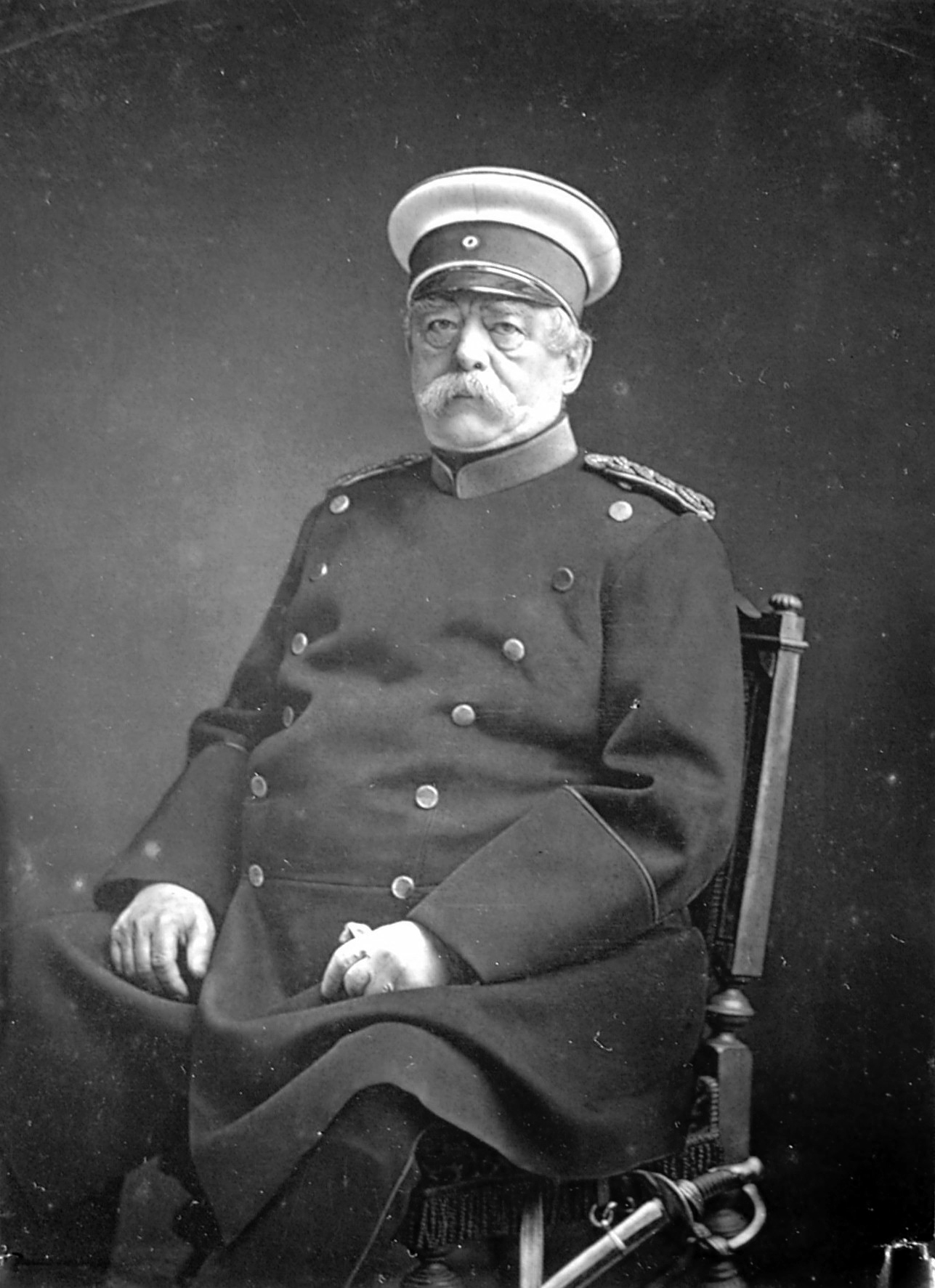
Otto von Bismarck became Chancellor of Germany in 1871 and launched the Kulturkampf Culture Struggle against the Catholic Church in Germany.

Accounts of 20th-century diplomatic relations between Germany and the Vatican commonly take as their starting point the political scene in the late 19th century. German Chancellor Bismarck's Kulturkampf ("Battle for Culture") of 1871–1878 saw an attempt to influence a Protestant vision of nationalism over the new German Empire, and fused anticlericalism with suspicion of the Catholic population, whose loyalty was presumed to lie with Austria and France. The Catholic Centre Party had formed in 1870, initially to represent the religious interests of Catholics and Protestants, but was transformed by the Kulturkampf into the "political voice of Catholics". Bismarck's Culture Struggle was largely a failure.

Bismarck sought to restrict the power of the Catholic Church in Germany. He regarded the Roman Church as "the enemy within". His Kulturkampf included the disbanding of Catholic organizations, confiscation of church property, banishment or imprisonment of clergy, and an ongoing feud with the Vatican. According to novelist James Carroll, the end of Kulturkampf signaled "that the Church had successfully resisted to his face the man [Bismarck] who, according to an admiring Henry Kissinger, was 'outmaneuvered' by nobody." The Catholic Church's firm resistance to Bismarck and Kulturkampf, including passive resistance by the Church in general and the excommunication of collaborating priests, has been used as benchmark for assessing the Church's response to the Nazis from the early 1930s through World War II.

=== End of World War I ===
A formal realignment of Church and state relationships was considered desirable in the aftermath of the political instability of 1918 and the adoption of the Weimar constitution for the Reich along with the new constitutions in the German states in 1919. Key issues that the Church hoped to resolve related to state subsidies to the Church, support for Catholic schools, the appointment of bishops and the legal position of the clergy. The Reich government, in turn, wished for reasons of foreign policy to have friendly relations with the Holy See. Also, Germany wanted to prevent new diocesan boundaries from being established which would dilute Germany's ties to ceded German territories in the east such as Danzig and Upper Silesia.

Negotiations relating to specific points, rather than a general concordat, took place between 1919 and 1922. But even after subsequent feelers were put out between the two parties the negotiations failed, primarily because both the Reichstag and Reichsrat were dominated by non-Catholic majorities who, for a variety of reasons, did not want a formal pact with the Vatican. In the absence of an agreement relating to particular areas of concern with the Reich, the Holy See concluded more wide-ranging concordats with three German states where Catholics were concentrated: Bavaria (1924), Prussia (1929), and Baden (1932).

=== Pope Pius XI ===
Pius XI was elected Pope in 1922. His pontificate coincided with the early aftermath of the First World War. The old European monarchies had been largely swept away and a new and precarious order formed across the continent. In the East, the Soviet Union arose. In Italy, the Fascist dictator Benito Mussolini took power, while in Germany, the fragile Weimar Republic collapsed with the Nazi seizure of power. Pope Pius's major diplomatic approach was to make concordats. However, wrote Hebblethwaite, these concordats did not prove "durable or creditable" and "wholly failed in their aim of safeguarding the institutional rights of the Church" for "Europe was entering a period in which such agreements were regarded as mere scraps of paper".

In 1929, Pius signed the Lateran Treaty and a concordat with Italy, confirming the existence of an independent Vatican City state, in return for recognition of the Kingdom of Italy and an undertaking for the papacy to be neutral in world conflicts. In Article 24 of the concordat, the papacy undertook "to remain outside temporal conflicts unless the parties concerned jointly appealed for the pacifying mission of the Holy See". Other major concordats included those signed with Germany (1933), Austria (1935), Yugoslavia (1935), and Latvia (1938). The concordats were generally observed by the countries involved, with the exception of Germany.

In October 1929, General Groener pushed the German Foreign Ministry for resolution with the Vatican regarding military chaplains who lacked the ability to administer the sacraments of baptism or matrimony without first obtaining the permission of the local priest or bishop. Groener wanted the military to have their own bishop rather than rely on local ordinaries and it was this particular issue that was to mark an important step in the discussions that would ultimately be realized in the concordat with the Vatican. In March 1930, the new Papal Secretary of State, Cardinal Pacelli, gave indications that the Vatican would be interested in a concordat with the Reich in the event of any reforms of the Reich's constitution having an adverse effect on the validity of the concordats already agreed between the German states and the Vatican.

Discussions between the two parties took place between 1931 and 1932 and at one point representatives of the Reich pointed out that Italy had an army Archbishop with Cardinal Pacelli indicating that was because Italy had signed a comprehensive concordat with the Vatican. The German negotiators continued to discuss solely on the basis of particular points rather than a general concordat during 1931 but even these were felt to be unlikely to be passed by the Reichstag or the Reichsrat, no matter their political or theological leanings.

== Nazi period ==
=== Nazis take power ===
In January 1933, Hitler became Chancellor. The passing of the Enabling Act on 23 March, in part, removed the Reichstag as an obstacle to concluding a concordat with the Vatican. In the discussion of the Act, Hitler offered the Reichstag the possibility of friendly co-operation, promising not to threaten the Reichstag, the President, the States, or the Churches if granted the emergency powers. With Nazi paramilitary encircling the building, he said: "It is for you, gentlemen of the Reichstag to decide between war and peace." The Act allowed Hitler and his Cabinet to rule by emergency decree for four years, though Hindenburg remained President.

German Catholics were wary of the new government:

The Catholic Church ... had generally viewed the Nazi Party with fear and suspicion. It had felt threatened by a radical ultranationalist ideology that regarded the papacy as a sinister, alien institution, that opposed denominational separatism in education and culture, and that at times appeared to promote a return to Nordic paganism. The establishment of the Third Reich seemed to portend the coming of a bitter conflict between church and state.

In early 1933, Hitler told Hermann Rauschning that Bismarck had been stupid in starting a Kulturkampf and outlined his own strategy for dealing with the clergy which would be based initially on a policy of toleration:

We should trap the priests by their notorious greed and self-indulgence. We shall thus be able to settle everything with them in perfect peace and harmony. I shall give them a few years' reprieve. Why should we quarrel? They will swallow anything in order to keep their material advantages. Matters will never come to a head. They will recognise a firm will, and we need only show them once or twice who is the master. They will know which way the wind blows.

An initially mainly sporadic persecution of the Catholic Church in Germany followed the Nazi takeover. Hitler was hostile to the Catholic Church, but he was also mindful that Catholics were a large proportion of the population in Germany: almost 40% in 1933. As such, for political reasons, Hitler was prepared to restrain his anticlericalism and did not allow himself to be drawn into attacking the Church publicly as other Nazis would have liked him to do. Kershaw wrote that, following the appointment of Hitler as Chancellor by President von Hindenburg, the Vatican was anxious to reach agreement with the new government, despite "continuing molestation of Catholic clergy, and other outrages committed by Nazi radicals against the Church and its organisations".

In March 1933, the British Roman Catholic periodical The Tablet in an article titled "The Ides of March" said:

[Hitler's] Dictatorship is a usurpation and his enforcement of it is a brutality. While we write these lines, with news of more arrests and repressions coming to us every hour, we remember that we have reached the Ides of March and the anniversary of a never-forgotten assassination. But Nazism's daggers cannot slay what is noblest and best in Germany. The Church, now that the Centre is no longer the key-group in German politics, may be persecuted; but HITLER will not succeed where BISMARCK failed.

Robert Ventresca wrote that because of increasing harassment of Catholics and Catholic clergy, Cardinal Pacelli sought quick ratification of a treaty with the government, seeking in this way to protect the German Church. When Vice-Chancellor Papen and Ambassador to the Vatican Diego von Bergen met Pacelli in late June 1933, they found him "visibly influenced" by reports of actions being taken against German Catholic interests.

The Church was keen on coming to terms with Hitler as he represented a strong resistance against Communism. The Papal Nuncio in Berlin (Cesare Osenigo) is reported to have been jubilant about Hitler's rise to power and thought that the new government would soon be offering the same concessions to the Church that Mussolini had made in Italy. Historian Michael Phayer balances Lewy and author and journalist John Cornwell stating:

John Cornwell in Hitler's Pope argues that the Concordat was the result of a deal that delivered the parliamentary votes to Hitler, thereby giving him dictatorial power (Enabling Act of 23 March 1933). This is historically inaccurate. According to "Papen Fails to Get Vatican's Support for Hitler's Plans. Pope Refuses Reconstruction of Centrist Party in Reich and General Concordat. Civil Service is Purged, German Decree Ousts Non-Aryans and Leftists and Excludes Their Admission in the Future," (The New York Times, 13 April 1933), von Papen and Goering were received by Pius XI in April 1933, but their mission was understood to have been a failure. They had wanted to obtain Vatican support for a scheme to reconstruct the Centre party to insure its stable support of the Hitler government and to conclude a general concordat between the Holy See and the Reich to replace the three present concordats with Prussia, Bavaria, and Baden. Neither suggestion was approved by the Pope. The failure was interpreted as evidence of the Vatican's lack of confidence in the durability of the Nazi government. The Vatican was likewise reticent to abandon the existing concordats with Prussia, Bavaria, and Baden for a general concordat with the Reich. However, there is no question about Pius XII's tenacious insistence on the Concordat retention before, during, and after the Second World War.

=== Negotiations ===
The Catholic bishops in Germany had generally shown opposition to Hitler from the beginning of his rise to power. When the Nazi Party polled six million votes during the 14 September 1930 election, the Catholic hierarchy called on its people to examine their consciences. During the next two years, bishops continued to pronounce against unacceptable policies of the Nazi Party. When Hindenburg appointed Hitler as Chancellor on 30 January 1933, the bishops maintained support for the Catholic Centre Party (Zentrum), which in turn refused to assent to a proposal that would allow Hitler to assume full power. On 12 March 1933, Pope Pius XI received the German Cardinal Faulhaber in Rome. On his return Faulhaber reported:

After my recent experience in Rome in the highest circles, which I cannot reveal here, I must say that I found, despite everything, a greater tolerance with regard to the new government. ... Let us meditate on the words of the Holy Father, who in a consistory, without mentioning his name, indicated before the whole world in Adolf Hitler the statesman who first, after the Pope himself, has raised his voice against Bolshevism.

At a cabinet meeting on 20 March 1933, Hitler was confident that the Centre Party had now seen the necessity of the Enabling Act and that "the acceptance of the Enabling Act also by the Zentrum would signify a strengthening prestige with regard to foreign countries." Early in March 1933, the bishops recommended that Catholics vote for the Centre Party in the elections scheduled for 5 March 1933. However, two weeks later the Catholic hierarchy reversed its previous policy: allowing the Centre Party and the Bavarian Catholic Party to vote for the Enabling Act which gave Hitler dictatorial powers on 23 March. German Catholic theologian Robert Grosche described the Enabling Act in terms of the 1870 decree on the infallibility of the Pope, and stated that the Church had "anticipated on a higher level, that historical decision which is made today on the political level: for the Pope and against the sovereignty of the Council; for the Fuhrer and against the Parliament." On 29 March 1933 Cardinal Pacelli sent word to the German bishops to the effect that they must change their position with regard to National Socialism. On 28 March 1933, the bishops themselves took up a position favourable to Hitler. According to Falconi (1966), the about-face came through the influence and instructions of the Vatican. Pope Pius XI indicated in Mit brennender Sorge (1937) that the Germans had asked for the concordat, and Pope Pius XII (the former Cardinal Pacelli) affirmed this in 1945.

Falconi viewed the Church's realignment as motivated by the desire to avoid being left alone in opposition and to avert reprisals. After the leader of the Centre Party, Monsignor Kaas, had persuaded the party members to vote for Hitler and the Enabling Act, he left immediately for Rome, and on his return on 31 March he was received by Hitler. He returned to Rome accompanied by the Catholic Vice-chancellor von Papen on 7 April with a mandate from Hitler to sound out a concordat with the Vatican. On the day they set out for Rome to prepare the way for the concordat, the first two anti-Semitic laws (excluding non-Aryans from public office and from the legal profession) were issued in Germany, but this did not impede the discussions. Papen recorded in his memoirs that on his arrival in Rome, the Pope "greeted me with paternal affection, expressing his pleasure that at the head of the German State was a man like Hitler, on whose banner the uncompromising struggle against Communism and Nihilism was inscribed." In Falconi's opinion the concordat was the price paid by Hitler to obtain the support of the German episcopate and the Catholic parties. Ian Kershaw viewed the loss of political Catholicism as the sacrifice needed to protect the position of the Catholic Church in Germany. According to historian Michael Phayer, the view "that the Concordat was the result of a deal that delivered the parliamentary vote of the Catholic Center Party to Hitler, thereby giving him dictatorial power (the Enabling Act of March 1933) ... is historically inaccurate".

Cardinal Faulhaber wrote to Cardinal Pacelli on 10 April 1933 advising that defending the Jews would be wrong "because that would transform the attack on the Jews into an attack on the Church; and because the Jews are able to look after themselves"—the latter assertion based on the outcome of the April boycott, which in spite of Nazi efforts had been mostly ignored and abandoned after only one day.

On 22 April 1933, the British Minister to the Vatican recounted what the Vatican Under-Secretary of State had told him: "The Holy See is not interested in the Centre Party. We are more concerned with the mass of Catholic voters in Germany than in the Catholic deputies who represent them in the Reichstag." Previously, as part of the agreement surrounding the 1929 Lateran Treaty with the Fascist government in Italy, the Vatican had consented to the dissolution of Partito Popolare, which had seen support among the Italian clergy. It had been previously dissolved in 1926.

At a 26 April meeting with Bishop Wilhelm Berning of Osnabrück, representative of the German Bishops' Conference, Hitler declared:

I have been attacked because of my handling of the Jewish question. The Catholic Church considered the Jews pestilent for fifteen hundred years, put them in ghettos, etc., because it recognized the Jews for what they were. In the epoch of liberalism the danger was no longer recognized. I am moving back toward the time in which a fifteen-hundred-year-long tradition was implemented. I do not set race over religion, but I recognize the representatives of this race as pestilent for the state and for the Church, and perhaps I am thereby doing Christianity a great service by pushing them out of schools and public functions.

The notes of the meeting do not record any response by Berning. In the opinion of Martin Rhonheimer, who cites the above transcript, "This is hardly surprising: for a Catholic Bishop in 1933 there was really nothing terribly objectionable in this historically correct reminder. And on this occasion, as always, Hitler was concealing his true intentions." Saul Friedländer interpreted Hitler's comments as an attempt to "blunt possible Catholic criticism of his anti-Jewish policies and to shift the burden of the arguments onto the Church itself.

Edith Stein—later canonized as Saint Teresa Benedicta of the Cross—wrote a letter to Pius XI in April 1933 about the persecution of the Jews in Nazi Germany. Her letter was sent personally via the Arch-Abbott of Beuron. She did not ask for an encyclical to be issued on the matter, as some have contended. The Arch-Abbott received an answer from Cardinal Pacelli, the future Pius XII. Edith Stein was murdered in the gas chamber at Auschwitz on 9 August 1942.

The issue of the concordat prolonged Kaas's stay in Rome, leaving the Centre Party without a chairman, and on 5 May Kaas finally resigned from his post. The party then elected Heinrich Brüning as its chairman. At that time, the Centre party was subject to increasing pressure in the wake of the process of Gleichschaltung and after all the other parties had dissolved (or were banned, like the SPD). The Centre Party dissolved itself on 5 July 1933, as the concordat between the Vatican and the Nazis had dealt it a decisive blow by exchanging a ban on the political activities of priests for the continuation of Catholic education. Cardinal Pacelli and von Papen initialled the concordat in Rome three days later, with signing taking place on 20 July. On 2 July, the Vatican daily newspaper L'Osservatore Romano insisted that the concordat was not an endorsement of Nazi teachings.

On 13 July, a British minister had an interview with Cardinal Pacelli and reported: "His Eminence said that the Vatican really viewed with indifference the dissolution of the Centre Party."

At the 14 July cabinet meeting, Hitler brushed aside any debate on the details of the concordat, expressing the view "that one should only consider it as a great achievement. The concordat gave Germany an opportunity and created an area of trust which was particularly significant in the developing struggle against international Jewry." Saul Friedländer said that Hitler may have countenanced in this "area of trust" what he perceived as the Christian Church's traditional theological antipathy towards Jews (see Hitler's comments above to Berning on 26 April) converging with Nazi aims. Hitler "underlined the triumph" that the Concordat meant for the Nazi regime. Only a short time earlier he had expressed doubts that "the church would be ready to commit the Bishops to this state. That this has happened, was without doubt an unreserved recognition of the present regime."

On 22 July 1933, von Papen attended a meeting of the Catholic Academic Union during which he first made the connection between the dissolution of the Centre Party and the concordat. He said the Pope was particularly pleased at the promised destruction of Bolshevism and that Pius XI had agreed to the treaty "in the recognition that the new Germany had fought a decisive battle against Bolshevism and the atheist movement." Papen stated "an undeniable inner connection between the dissolution of the German Center party that has just taken place and the conclusion of the Concordat" and ended his speech with a call for German Catholicism to put away former resentments and to help build Nazi Germany. Abbot Herwegen told the meeting:

What the liturgical movement is to the religious realm, fascism is to the political realm. The German stands and acts under authority, under leadership – whoever does not follow endangers society. Let us say 'yes' wholeheartedly to the new form of the total State, which is analogous throughout to the incarnation of the Church. The Church stands in the world as Germany stands in politics today.

On 23 July, a British minister met Cardinal Pacelli who appeared "very satisfied" with the signing of the concordat. The cardinal expressed the view that, with the guarantees given relating to Catholic education, this concordat was an improvement over the 1929 agreement with Prussia. Cardinal Pacelli did sound a note of caution in that his satisfaction was based on the assumption that the German Government "remained true to its undertaking", but said also that Hitler "was becoming increasingly moderate".

On 24 July, Cardinal Faulhaber sent a handwritten letter to Hitler, noting that "For Germany's prestige in the East and the West and before the whole world, this handshake with the papacy, the greatest moral power in the history of the world, is a feat of immeasurable importance."

On 4 August 1933, the British Minister reported "in conversations I have had with Cardinal Pacelli and Monsignor Pizzardo, neither gave me the feeling of the slightest regret at the eclipse of the Centre [Party], and its consequent loss of influence in German politics". On 19 August, Ivone Kirkpatrick had a further discussion with Cardinal Pacelli in which he expressed his "disgust and abhorrence" at Hitler's reign of terror to the diplomat. Pacelli said "I had to choose between an agreement on their lines and the virtual elimination of the Catholic Church in the Reich." Pacelli also told Kirkpatrick that he deplored the persecution of the Jews, but a pistol had been held to his head and that he had no alternative, being given only one week to decide. Pinchas Lapide said that while negotiations for the concordat were taking place, pressure had been put on the Vatican by the arrest of ninety-two priests, the searching of Catholic youth-club premises, and the closing down of nine Catholic publications. The Nazi newspaper Völkischer Beobachter wrote: "By her signature the Catholic Church has recognised National Socialism in the most solemn manner. ... This fact constitutes an enormous moral strengthening of our government and its prestige."

The concordat was ratified on 10 September 1933 and Cardinal Pacelli took the opportunity to send a note to the Germans raising the topic of the social and economic condition of Jews who had converted to Catholicism but not of Jews in general.

Meanwhile, although the Protestant churches, being local congregations, remained unaffected by restrictions on foreign support, Hitler's government negotiated other agreements with them which in essence put Nazi officials, most of whom were Catholics, into positions of influence or outright authority over Protestant churches. Foreseeing the potential for outright State control of their churches which these agreements portended, many Protestant church leaders simply reorganized their congregations out of the agreements, causing a schism within the Protestant Churches. These Protestant resisters attempted to rally Catholic prelates to the dangers portended by these agreements, but were simply rebuffed when the Reichskonkordat was ratified. Many of the Protestant clergy who opposed the Nazi religious program (Bekennende Kirche or Confessing Church) later suffered imprisonment or execution.

Church leaders were realistic about the concordat's protections. Cardinal Faulhaber is reported to have said: "With the concordat we are hanged, without the concordat we are hanged, drawn and quartered." After the signing of the concordat, the papal nuncio exhorted the German bishops to support Hitler's régime. The bishops told their flocks to try to get along with the Nazi régime. According to Michael Phayer, the concordat prevented Pius XI from speaking out against the Nazi Nuremberg Laws in 1935, and though he did intend to speak out after the nationwide pogrom of 1938, Cardinal Pacelli dissuaded him from doing so.

On 20 August 1935, the Catholic Bishops conference at Fulda reminded Hitler that Pius XI had:

exchanged the handshake of trust with you through the concordat – the first foreign sovereign to do so. ... Pope Pius spoke high praise of you. ... Millions in foreign countries, Catholics and non-Catholics alike, have overcome their original mistrust because of this expression of papal trust, and have placed their trust in your regime.

In a sermon given in Munich during 1937, Cardinal Faulhaber declared:

At a time when the heads of the major nations in the world faced the new Germany with reserve and considerable suspicion, the Catholic Church, the greatest moral power on earth, through the Concordat, expressed its confidence in the new German government. This was a deed of immeasurable significance for the reputation of the new government abroad.

=== The concordat ===
The Treaty with Additional Protocol [in brackets] was signed 20 July 1933. It was ratified and in force starting 10 September 1933 and remains in force. The text of the concordat was released 22 July 1933 and began with a preamble that set out the common desire of both parties for friendly relations set-out in a solemn agreement.

Preamble

His Holiness Pope Pius XI and the President of the German Reich [Paul von Hindenburg], led by their common desire to consolidate and enhance the existing friendly relations between the Catholic Church and the state in the whole territory of the German Reich in a stable and satisfactory manner for both parties, have decided to conclude a solemn agreement which will supplement the concordats already concluded with some particular German States (Laender) and secure for the others the principles of a uniform treatment of the questions involved.

His Holiness Pope Pius XI has appointed as his plenipotentiary [a diplomat granted full power to represent] His Eminence the Most Revered Cardinal Eugenio Pacelli, His Holiness' Secretary of State; and the President of the German Reich [Paul von Hindenburg] has appointed as plenipotentiary the Vice-Chairman of the German Reich, Herr Franz von Papen; who, having exchanged their proper form have agreed to the following articles.

Additional Protocol {in brackets}

When the signing of the concordat concluded today between the Holy See and the German Reich, the undersigned, being duly empowered to do so, have formulated the following explanations which form an integral part of the concordat itself.

- Article 1 The German Reich guarantees freedom of profession and public practice of the Catholic religion. It recognizes the right of the Catholic Church to regulate and manage her own affairs independently within the limits of the law applicable to all and to issue – within the framework of her own competence – laws and ordinances binding on her members.

The vagueness of the article would later lead to contradictory interpretations.

- Article 2 The concordats concluded with Bavaria (1924), Prussia (1929) and Baden (1932) and the rights and privileges of the Catholic Church recognized therein remain unchanged within the territory of the States (Laender) concerned. For the rest of the states provisions of the present concordat shall be fully applicable. These provisions shall also be binding for the said three states in so far as they are relative to matters not regulated by the concordats concluded with those states, or in so far as they complete the arrangements already made.

Affirms the state concordats, Länderkonkordate, with Bavaria (1924), Prussia (1929), and Baden (1932) remain valid.

- Article 3 In order to foster good relations between the Holy See and the German Reich, an apostolic nuncio will continue to reside, as hitherto, in the capital of the German Reich and an ambassador of the German Reich will reside with the Holy See. (With regard to Art. 3. In accordance to the exchange between the apostolic nunciature and the Reich foreign office on the 11 and 12 March respectively, the apostolic nuncio to the German Reich shall be the dean of the diplomatic corps accredited in Berlin.)

Confirms the Vatican having a Papal Nuncio (diplomat) in Berlin and the German government having an ambassador in Rome.

- Article 4 The Holy See shall enjoy full freedom in its contact and correspondence with the bishops, clergy and all other members of the Catholic Church in Germany. The same applies to the bishops and other diocesan authorities in their contact with the faithful in all matters of their pastoral office. Instructions, ordinances, pastoral letters, official diocesan gazettes and other enactments concerning the spiritual guidance of the faithful, issued by the ecclesiastical authorities within the framework of their competence, may be published without hindrance and made known to the faithful in the ways heretofore usual.

Article 4 assures the Holy See of full freedom to communicate with the German clergy and for the German bishops to communicate with the laity "in all matters of their pastoral office." The words of qualification in this clause would later be interpreted by the Nazis in its most narrow meaning to limit the Church communications to worship and ritual only.

- Article 5 The clergy enjoy in the discharge of their spiritual activities the same protection of the state as state officials. The state will proceed according to general provisions of its law in case of any outrage directed against any clergy personally or against their ecclesiastical character or in case of any interference with duties of their office and, if necessary, will provide official protection.
- Article 6 Clerics and religious are exempt from the obligation to undertake public offices and such obligations as are incompatible with their clerical or religious status. This applies particularly to the office of magistrate, member of a jury in law courts, membership of taxation committees or membership of the fiscal tribunal.
- Article 7 A member of the clergy can accept an official function or appointment in the state or in any publicly constituted corporation dependent on the state only after having received the nihil obstat of his diocesan ordinary [bishop], as well as that of the ordinary competent for the place where the seat of the corporation is situated. For important reasons in which the interests of the Church are involved, the nihil obstat can be withdrawn at any time.
- Article 8 The official income of the clergy is exempt from distraint to the same extent as the official salary of the civil servants of the Reich and of the states.
- Article 9 The judicial and other authorities cannot ask the clergy to give information about matters which have been entrusted to them while exercising the care of souls and which are consequently covered by the obligation of pastoral secrecy.
- Article 10 The wearing of clerical dress or of a religious habit by lay persons or by clerics or religious who have been forbidden to wear it on the strength of a final and valid decision of the competent Church authority – officially communicated to the state authorities – shall be punished by the state with the same penalties as the misuse of a military uniform.

Articles 5–10 dealt with the status of the clergy under German law. Priests were given protection against any interference in their spiritual activities as well as protection against malicious slander or misuse of clerical dress. Exemption from jury service, and like obligations, was guaranteed and the secrecy of the confessional guaranteed. Members of the clergy could only accept a state appointment so long as the bishop approved and this permission could be withdrawn at any time for important reasons.

- Article 11 The present organization and delimitation (boundaries) of the Roman Catholic dioceses in the German Reich remains at it is. If, however, the rearrangement of a bishopric or of an ecclesiastical province, or any other changes in the delimitation of diocese appear necessary in the future, they will be subject to agreement with the government of the state concerned in case that they involve changes only with boundaries of one German state (Land). In case of rearrangement of changes which exceed the boundaries of one German state, the agreement is to be made with the Reich government, to whose care it shall be left secure the consent of the state governments in question. The same applies to the establishment of new ecclesiastical provinces or alterations therein if these involve several German states. The foregoing provisions are not applicable to the shifting of boundaries which is made only with regard to the local care of souls. In case of a wider reorganization within the German reich, the Reich government shall consult with the Holy See with a view to such regrouping of dioceses and to their delimitation.
- Article 12 Without prejudice to the provisions of Article 11, ecclesiastical offices can be freely established and altered if no subsidy is asked for from the state funds. The co-operation of the state in establishing and changing the parish communities shall proceed according to the rules which have been arranged with the diocesan bishops; the Reich government will endeavor to achieve a uniform formulation by the state governments of their rules as far as possible.

Articles 11–12 specified that diocesan boundaries had to be made subject to government approval and that ecclesiastical offices could be established if no state funding was involved.

- Article 13 Catholic parishes and diocesan associations, episcopal sees, bishoprics and chapters, religious orders and congregations, as well as institutions, foundations and property of the Catholic Church administered by ecclesiastical authorities, shall retain or acquire respectively juridical personality, recognized by the State according to the general provisions of civil law. They shall remain publicly recognized corporations as far as they have been such hitherto; the same rights may be granted to the others in accordance with the general law applicable to all. (With regard to Art. 13. It is understood that the right of the Church to levy taxes is guaranteed.)

Article 13 gave to parishes, Episcopal sees, religious orders, etc. juridical personality and granted the same rights as any other publicly recognised body "in accordance with the general law as applicable to all" which subjected the church's prerogatives to legal regulation under civil law. Guenter Lewy viewed this qualification as establishing "a pandora's box of troubles" when the law was effectively in the hands of a regime who wanted to control the church.

- Article 14 As a rule, the Church has the right to appoint freely to all the Church dignities and benefices without any co-operation on the part of the state or of the civil corporations, unless any other arrangement has been made in previous concordats mentioned in Article 2. As for the appointment to the metropolitan see of Freiburg, in the diocese of the Upper Rhine, it shall be applicable to the two suffragan [subordinate] bishoprics of Rottenburg and Mainz, as well as to the bishoprics of Meissen. The same applies in the said two suffragan bishoprics as regards the appointments to the cathedral chapters and the settlement of the rights of patronage. Furthermore, agreement has been reached on the following points. (i) Catholic clerics who enjoy a spiritual office in Germany or exercise there a pastoral or educational activity, must: (a) be German citizens; (b) have obtained a school certificate (certificate of maturity) entitling them to study at a higher German school; (c) have studied philosophy and theology for at least three years at a German state university, an academic ecclesiastical college in Germany, or a papal high school in Rome. (ii) The Bulls containing appointments of archbishops, bishops, coadjutors cum iure successionis (right of succession) or of a prelatus nullis (a bishop who has jurisdiction independent of a diocese) will not be issued before the name of the selected has been communicated to the Reichsstatthalter in the State (Land) in question, and before it has been ascertained that there are no objections of a general political nature against such a person. The conditions laid down above (i) par (a), (b), (c), can be discarded by mutual agreement between Church and state. (With regard to Art. 14, par. 2, sect. 2. It is understood that if objections of a general political nature exist, they shall be presented as soon as possible. Should they not be presented within twenty days, the Holy See will be entitled to believe there are no objections against the candidate in question. Before an official announcement of the appointment is made, secrecy shall be kept about the candidates concerned. This article does not establish for the state a right to veto.)

Article 14 specified appointments of a bishop by the Pope was subject to mutual agreement and communication with the regime that no [general] political impediment existed, while affirming appointments may be made without any co-operation on the part of the state or civil corporations.

- Article 15 Religious orders and congregations are not subject, on the part of the state, to any particular restrictions as far as their foundation, their various establishments, the number of their members and their qualifications (save, however, for the previsions of art. 15 par. 2), their pastoral or educational activity, their care of the sick and charitable work, the management of their affairs and the administration of their property are concerned. Superiors of religious orders who have their official residence within the German Reich must have German citizenship. Provincials and superiors whose official residence is situated outside the German territory have the right of visitation of their establishments in Germany, even if they have a foreign citizenship. The Holy See will see to it that the organization of the provinces of various religious orders, as regards their establishments in Germany, should be such as to avoid – so far as it can be done – the subordination of German establishments to foreign provincials. Exceptions therefrom may be admitted by mutual agreement with the Reich government, particularly in cases where the small number of establishments in Germany makes the formation of German province impracticable or where special reasons exist for the maintenance of a provincial organization rooted in history and working well in practice.

Article 15 guaranteed religious orders freedom for pastoral, charitable and educational work.

- Article 16 Before taking possession of their diocese, the bishops shall take an oath of loyalty either between the hands of the Reichsstatthalter in the state (Land) in question or between those of the president of the Reich, the formula of which shall be the following: "Before God and on the Holy Gospel I swear and promise, as becomes a bishop, loyalty to the German Reich and to the Land of (name of Land). I swear and promise to respect the government established according to the constitution and to cause the clergy of my diocese to respect it. In due solicitude for the welfare and the interests of the German Reich, I will endeavor, while performing the spiritual office bestowed upon me, to prevent anything which might threaten to be detrimental to it."

Article 16 specified Bishops must take an oath of loyalty and respect to either the Reich governor of the state concerned or to the President of the Reich as established by the constitution. When the treaty was signed and ratified the word Reich, or the phrase, German Reich, is not in reference to the so-called "Third Reich". It applies to the period of the Weimar Republic which did not officially and fully collapse until the death of President Paul von Hindenburg 2 August 1934 with the passing of a national referendum vote 19 August 1934 consolidating the Office of Chancellor and President, thereby, declaring Adolf Hitler Führer of Germany.

- Article 17 The property and all other proprietary rights of the publicly recognized corporations, institutions, foundations and associations of the Catholic Church will be guaranteed according to the common law of the state. No building used for public worship can be demolished under any pretext or for any reason whatsoever, except if a mutual agreement has been reached beforehand with the competent ecclesiastical authority. (With regard to Art. 17. In so far as building or land belonging to the state have been devoted to ecclesiastical purposes, they will continue to be devoted to them, with due regard, however, to the contracts which might have been concluded about them.)

Article 17 guaranteed, according to the common law, the properties of the church.

- Article 18 Should the state payments in kind or money, which are made to the Catholic Church, whether based on law, contract, or any other special legal title, be discontinued, the Holy See and the Reich will proceed in due time beforehand to set up amicable agreement the principles according to which the discontinuation is to be carried out. In this connection, a right derived from a legitimate traditional custom is to be considered as a special legal title. Such discontinuation, implying the cessation of a state payment or obligation, must be adequately compensated in favor of the claimant.

Article 18 assured the Church that it would be consulted should the Nazi regime (or existing government) try to discontinue its subsidies to the German Catholic church or other legal title without compensation as specified in Article 138 of the Weimar Constitution for all religious organizations.

- Article 19 Catholic theological faculties in state universities shall be maintained. Their relationship to the Church authorities will be regulated by the provisions of the respective concordats and by the protocols annexed to them, with due regard to the ecclesiastical laws relative to these faculties. The Reich will endeavor to secure for all German Catholic faculties in question a uniform regime in accordance with the general spirit of the regulations concerned. (With regard to Art. 19, sent. 2. The basis referred to consists, at the time when this concordat is being concluded, especially of the Apostolic Constitution Deus scienitarum dominus 24 May 1931, and the Instruction of 7 May July 1932.)
- Article 20 The Church has the right, unless there is some other agreement, to establish theological and philosophical colleges for the training of clergy; if no state subsidies are claimed for these institutions, they will be dependent solely on the ecclesiastical authorities. The establishment, management and administration of seminaries and hostels for clerical students pertains exclusively, within the limits of the law applicable to all, to ecclesiastical authorities. (With regard to Art. 20. Hostels connected with high and secondary schools and administered by the Church will be recognized, from the taxation stand-point, as being in practice ecclesiastical institutions in the proper sense of the word, and as of diocesan origin.)
- Article 21 Catholic religious instruction in primary, vocational, secondary and higher schools is a regular subject of tuition and is to be taught in accordance with the principles of the Catholic Church. In religious instruction the patriotic, civic and social consciousness and sense of duty will be particularly stressed and cultivated, as this is generally done in the school training. The teaching program of religious education and the selection of text books will be settled with by agreement with the higher ecclesiastical authorities. These authorities will be given the opportunity to control, in harmony with the school authorities, whether pupils are receiving religious instruction in accordance with the teaching and requirements of the Church.
- Article 22 Mutual agreements shall be arrived at between the bishops and the governments of German states (Laender) with regard to the appointment of the teachers of religion. Teachers who have been declared by the bishop unfit for the further exercise of their teaching function, either for pedagogical reasons or on account of their moral behavior, must not be employed as teachers of religion as long as the obstacle remains.
- Article 23 The maintenance of the existing Catholic confessional schools and the establishment of new ones is hereby guaranteed. In all localities where parents or guardians request it, Catholic primary schools will be established if the number of their prospective pupils, considered from the point of view of the local school conditions, appears to be sufficient for the establishment of a school corresponding to the standards prescribed by the state legislation.
- Article 24 Only members of the Catholic Church who can be trusted that they will correspond to the special requirements of a Catholic confessional school, can be employed as teachers in all Catholic primary schools. Within the framework of the professional training of teachers, arrangements will be made to guarantee the education and training of Catholic teachers capable of fulfilling the special requirements of Catholic confessional schools. (With regard to Art. 24. In so far as private institutions are able to satisfy, after the new regulations regarding the education of teachers, the general applicable requirements of the state, the existing establishments of religious orders and congregations will be given due consideration in the accordance of recognition.)
- Article 25 Religious orders and congregations have the right to establish and run private schools within the limits of the general legislation and conditions laid down by the law. The same qualifications as in state schools can be acquired in these private schools if they follow the teaching program prescribed for state schools. Members of religious orders and congregations are subject, with regard to their employment in private schools, to the general conditions applicable to all.

Articles 19–25 gave protection to the Catholic educational system (Hitler in due course would disregard them).

- Article 26 Pending a later and more detailed settlement of matters regarding matrimonial law, it is understood that a church wedding may precede the civil marriage ceremony not only in the case of a grave illness of one of the fiancés which does not permit any delay, but in the case of great moral emergency (which, however, must be confirmed by the competent episcopal authority). In such cases, the parish priest is bound to report the matter at once to the registrar's office. (With regard to Art. 26. It is considered to be a great moral emergency if the timely procuring of documents necessary for the wedding meets with obstacles which are either insuperable or whose removal would be disproportionately costly.)

Article 26 allowed that a church wedding could precede a civil marriage ceremony in certain cases.

- Article 27 A special and exempt pastoral ministry is conceded to the officers, employees, and men of the Germany army and to their families. An army bishop will be in charge of this pastoral care. His ecclesiastical appointment will be effected by the Holy See after contact has been made with the Reich government to select, by mutual agreement, a suitable candidate. The ecclesiastical appointment of the military chaplains and other military clergy will be made by the military bishop after previous consultation with the competent authorities of the Reich. The army bishop can, however, appoint as military chaplains only such priests who have obtained, from their ordinary, permission to engage in military pastoral work and who have obtained an appropriate certificate of fitness. Military chaplains have the rights of parish priests with regard to the troops and other army personnel assigned to their care. An apostolic brief will be issued to regulate in detail the Catholic care of souls in the army. Regulations about the position of army chaplains as state officials will be issued by the Reich government. (With regard to Art. 27, sent. 2. Catholic army officers, personnel and men, as well as their families, do not belong to the local parish communities and are not to contribute to their maintenance. With regard to sent. 4. The apostolic brief will be issued in agreement with the Reich government.)

Article 27 regulated the appointment of military chaplains.

- Article 28 The Church will be admitted to pastoral visits and to the holding of divine service in hospitals, prisons, and similar public institutions. If a regular care of souls, requiring appointment of clergy as state or public officials, is introduced in such institutions, this will be made by agreement with the higher Church authorities.

Article 28 assured the Church the right to pastoral care in hospitals, prisons and like institutions, which would be violated later by the Nazi regime when it refused the Church's request to carry out services in concentration camps.

- Article 29 Catholic members of non-German national minorities living within the Reich will not be placed in a worse status with regard to the use of their mother tongue in divine service, religious instruction and Church societies, than is the corresponding legal and practical position of the population of German origin and speech living in the territory of the corresponding foreign state. (With regard to Art. 29. Since the Reich government has shown itself ready to make concessions with regard to non-German minorities, the Holy See declares – confirming hereby the principles which it has constantly maintained regarding the right of using the vernacular in the pastoral ministry, religious instruction and in the activities of Catholic associations – that it will keep in mind, when concluding future concordats with other countries, the inclusion in them of provisions of a similar value for the rights of German minorities there.)

Article 29 granted the same rights to national minorities, with respect to the use of the mother tongue in divine services, as were enjoyed by the German population in the corresponding foreign state.

- Article 30 On Sundays and Holy Days a prayer will be said for the welfare of the German Reich and its people in episcopal, parish, affiliated and conventional churches in the German Reich, immediately after the High Mass and according to the rules of the Church liturgy.
- Article 31 Catholic organizations and associations whose activity is devoted exclusively to religious, purely cultural and charitable purposes and which are, as such, subordinated to Church authorities, are protected as to their institution and activities. Catholic organizations which, apart from religious cultural or charitable purposes, have other tasks such as social or professional aims, shall also enjoy the protection of this article 31, paragraph 1, even though their organization may be disposed in associations corresponding to states (Laender), provided they guarantee to develop their activities outside political parties. It is reserved to the Reich government and the German episcopate (bishops) to determine by mutual agreement the organizations and associations which fall within the provisions of this article. (With regard to Art. 31, par.4. The principles laid down in par. 4 of this article are equally valid for the labor service.)
- Article 32 With regard to the special conditions existing in Germany and with regard to the provisions of the present concordat guaranteeing legislation to protect the rights and privileges of the Catholic Church in the Reich and its states (Laender), the Holy See will issue ordinances by which the clergy and the religious will be forbidden to be members of political parties or to be active on their behalf. (With regard to Art. 32. It is understood that the same provisions, regarding activity in political parties, will be enacted by the Reich for the non-Catholic confessions. The conduct which has been stipulated as a duty for the German clergy and members of religious in Art. 32 does not mean any restriction on their preaching and exposition of the dogmatic and moral teachings and principles of the Church, as it is their duty to do.)

Articles 31–32 relate to the issue of Catholic organizations "devoted exclusively to religious, cultural and charitable purposes" and empowered the Reich government and German episcopate to "determine, by mutual agreement, the organizations and associations which fall within the provisions of this article." Organizations (sponsored by the Catholic Church) that had any political aims no longer had any place in the new Germany; this went without saying and is not even mentioned. Article 32 gave to Hitler one of his principal objectives: the exclusion of the clergy from politics such that "the Holy See will issue ordinances by which the clergy and the religious will be forbidden to be members of political parties or to be active on their behalf." Catholic laity, however, were free to form, engage and propagate political parties and seek political office. The Additional Protocol provisions make clear this prohibition of clergy from political activism does not mean they can not preach on moral teachings and principles of the Church "as it is their duty to do."

- Article 33 All matters regarding clerical persons or Church affairs which have not been mentioned in the preceding articles will be settled, for the sphere of the Church, according to canon law in force. Should a divergence arise, in the future, as to the interpretation or application of any provisions of this concordat, the Holy See and the German Reich will arrive at an amicable solution by mutual agreement.
- Article 34 This Concordat, whose German and Italian texts shall have equal binding force, shall be ratified and the certificates of ratification shall be exchanged as soon as possible. It will be enforced from the day of exchange. In witness hereof the plenipotentiaries (representatives) have signed this Concordat. Signed in the two original exemplars, in the Vatican City, 30 July 1933. Signed: Eugenio, Cardinal Pacelli. Signed: Franz von Papen.

Article 33 makes provision for settling any difficulties in interpretation of the concordat through "amicable solution by mutual agreement." Article 34 calls for the speedy ratification of the concordat. As the document states, It was not in force until its ratification 10 September 1933.

An additional secret protocol was added at its signing. When the concordat was ratified 10 September 1933 it granted Catholic clergy certain exemptions from any future universal army conscription call-ups. As Article 27 states, "A special and exempt ministry is conceded." As the Treaty of Versailles had forbidden Germany from raising a large army, this provision may have been seen by Hitler as the Vatican giving its tacit approval to German rearmament. Papen wrote to Hitler regarding this secret provision and concluded his brief with, "I hope this agreement will therefore be pleasing to you." The provisions of the annexe were inserted at the request of the German Bishops Fulda Conference and the contents were kept so secret that Ernst von Weizsacker, State Secretary in the Foreign Ministry from 1938, did not know of it until informed by the Papal Nuncio Orsenigo in 1939.

=== Reception ===
While the highest authorities of the Catholic Church in the Vatican liked the agreement, most of the bishops and common clergy saw it negatively; this was especially true in Germany where most bishops and priests disapproved of National Socialism and thus received the news coldly; for example, most refused to even hold a Te Deum service to celebrate its approval.

Catholic clergy outside Germany mostly rejected the concordat as well; for instance the British Roman Catholic periodical The Tablet openly reported the signing of the concordat negatively:

Already it is being said that THE POPE OF ROME thinks of nobody save his own adherents and that he does not care how Lutherans are dragooned and how Jews are harried so long as Popish bishops, monastic orders, confessional schools, and Catholic associations are allowed full freedom. We beg our Protestant and Jewish friends to put away such suspicions. As we suggested at the outset of this brief article, the Catholic Church could have done little for other denominations in Germany if she had begun thrusting out wild hands to help them while her own feet were slipping under her. By patience and reasonableness she has succeeded in re-establishing herself, more firmly than before, on a Concordat which does not surrender one feather's weight of essential Catholic principle. She will straightway set about her sacred task, an important part of which will be the casting out of those devils which have been raging – and are raging still – in the Reich. But "this sort" of devil is not cast out save by prayer. Political action (from which the German clergy are debarred under the Concordat) by the Church would drive matters from bad to worse. We are confident, however, that Catholics will abhor the idea of enjoying complete toleration while Protestants and Jews are under the harrow, and that, quietly but strongly, the Catholic influence will be exerted in the right direction. One German out of three is a Catholic; and Catholic prestige is high in Germany's public life.

Criticism of the concordat was initially from those countries who viewed Germany as a potential threat. Le Temps wrote: "This is a triumph for the National Socialist government. It took Mussolini five years to achieve this; Germany has done it in a week." L'Ere Nouvelle wrote: "The contradiction of a system preaching universalism making an agreement with a highly nationalistic state has been repeated throughout Vatican history. The Church never attacks existing institutions, even if they are bad. It prefers to wait for their collapse, hoping for the emergence of a higher morality. The Polish newspaper Kurjer Poranny wrote on 19 July 1933: "Once again we see the methods of the Vatican – intransigent with the passive and amenable, but accommodating with the high-handed and ruthless. In the last century it rewarded its persecutor, Bismarck, with the highest Papal decoration, the Order of Christ. ...The Centre Party, which most courageously resisted the Nazis, has been disowned by the Vatican." Ex-Chancellor Bruning reported that 300 Protestant pastors who had been on the verge of joining the Catholic Church on account of the stand it had taken against the Nazis abandoned the plan after the signing of the concordat. On 24 July, the Nazi newspaper Völkischer Beobachter commented:

The provocative agitation which for years was conducted against the NSDAP because of its alleged hostility to religion has now been refuted by the Church itself. This fact signifies a tremendous moral strengthening of the National Socialist government of the Reich and its reputation.

On 26 and 27 July 1933, the Vatican daily newspaper L'Osservatore Romano stressed the advantages gained by the church through the concordat but also said that the church had not given up her traditional neutrality towards different forms of political government nor did it endorse a "specific trend of political doctrines or ideas." The Nazis replied through the German press on 30 July by correcting perceived false interpretations of the concordat and "reminding the Vatican" that the concordat had been signed with the German Reich which "as Rome should know, is completely dominated by the National Socialist trend" and therefore "the de facto and de jure recognition of the National Socialist government" was signaled by the concordat. The Vatican demanded that the German government dissociate itself from these remarks but agreed eventually to forget its complaints so long as the German press refrained from any further "harping on the great victory" achieved by Nazi Germany.

=== Violations ===
Nazi violations of the concordat commenced almost immediately after it was signed. The Nazis claimed jurisdiction over all collective and social activity, interfering with Catholic schooling, youth groups, workers' clubs and cultural societies. Hitler had a "blatant disregard" for the concordat, wrote Paul O'Shea, and its signing was to him merely a first step in the "gradual suppression of the Catholic Church in Germany". Anton Gill wrote that "with his usual irresistible, bullying technique, Hitler then proceeded to take a mile where he had been given an inch" and closed all Catholic institutions whose functions were not strictly religious:

It quickly became clear that [Hitler] intended to imprison the Catholics, as it were, in their own churches. They could celebrate mass and retain their rituals as much as they liked, but they could have nothing at all to do with German society otherwise. Catholic schools and newspapers were closed, and a propaganda campaign against the Catholics was launched.

Within the same month of signing the concordat, the Nazis promulgated their sterilization law – the Law for the Prevention of Hereditarily Diseased Offspring – a policy the Catholic Church considered deeply offensive. Days later, moves began to dissolve the Catholic Youth League. Clergy, religious sisters, and lay leaders began to be targeted with thousands of arrests over the ensuing years, on trumped up charges of currency smuggling or immorality. Priests were watched closely and frequently denounced, arrested and sent to concentration camps. From 1940, a dedicated Clergy Barracks had been established at Dachau concentration camp. Intimidation of clergy was widespread. Cardinal Faulhaber was shot at. Cardinal Innitzer had his Vienna residence ransacked in October 1938, and Bishop Sproll of Rottenburg was jostled and his home vandalised.

William Shirer wrote that the German people were not greatly aroused by the persecution of the churches by the Nazi Government. The majority were not moved to face death or imprisonment for the sake of freedom of worship, being too impressed by Hitler's early foreign policy successes and the restoration of the German economy. Few, he wrote, "paused to reflect that the Nazi regime intended to destroy Christianity in Germany, if it could, and substitute the old paganism of the early tribal Germanic gods and the new paganism of the Nazi extremists."

Anti-Nazi sentiment grew in Catholic circles as the Nazi government increased its repressive measures against their activities. In his history of the German Resistance, Hoffmann writes that, from the beginning:

[The Catholic Church] could not silently accept the general persecution, regimentation or oppression, nor in particular the sterilization law of summer 1933. Over the years until the outbreak of war Catholic resistance stiffened until finally its most eminent spokesman was the Pope himself with his encyclical Mit brennender Sorge ... of 14 March 1937, read from all German Catholic pulpits.

After constant confrontations, by late 1935, Bishop Clemens August von Galen of Münster was urging a joint pastoral letter protesting against an "underground war" against the church. By early 1937, the church hierarchy in Germany, which had initially attempted to co-operate with the new government, had become highly disillusioned. In March, Pope Pius XI issued the Mit brennender Sorge encyclical – accusing the Nazi Government of violations of the 1933 concordat, and further that it was sowing the "tares of suspicion, discord, hatred, calumny, of secret and open fundamental hostility to Christ and His Church". The Nazis responded with an intensification of the Church Struggle, beginning around April.

When the Nazi government violated the concordat (in particular Article 31), the bishops and the Papacy protested against these violations. Pius XI considered terminating the concordat, but his secretary of state and members of the curia, who feared the impact upon German Catholics, dissuaded him, as they believed it would result in the loss of a protective shield. Cardinal Pacelli acknowledged his role in its retention after the war.

The flourishing Catholic press of Germany faced censorship and closure. Finally in March 1941, Goebbels banned all Church press, on the pretext of a "paper shortage". Catholic schools were a major battleground in the kirchenkampf campaign against the Church. When in 1933 the Nazi school superintendent of Münster issued a decree that religious instruction be combined with discussion of the "demoralising power" of the "people of Israel", Bishop Clemens August Graf von Galen of Münster refused, writing that such interference in curriculum was a breach of the concordat and that he feared children would be confused as to their "obligation to act with charity to all men" and as to the historical mission of the people of Israel. Galen protested directly to Hitler over violations of the concordat. When in 1936, Nazis removed crucifixes in schools, protest by Galen led to public demonstrations. Church kindergartens were closed, crucifixes were removed from schools and Catholic welfare programs were restricted on the basis they assisted the "racially unfit". Parents were coerced into removing their children from Catholic schools. In Bavaria, teaching positions allotted to sisters were awarded to secular teachers and denominational schools were transformed into "community schools". When in 1937 the authorities in Upper Bavaria attempted to replace Catholic schools with "common schools", Cardinal Faulhaber offered fierce resistance. By 1939 all Catholic denominational schools had been disbanded or converted to public facilities.

=== World War II ===
From 1940, the Gestapo launched an intense persecution of the monasteries, invading, searching and appropriating them. The Provincial of the Dominican Province of Teutonia, Laurentius Siemer, a spiritual leader of the German Resistance, was influential in the Committee for Matters Relating to the Orders, which formed in response to Nazi attacks against Catholic monasteries and aimed to encourage the bishops to intercede on behalf of the Orders and oppose the Nazi state more emphatically.

In 1941, an expansion of the regime's attack on the churches grew as did the war in the East. Monasteries and convents were targeted and expropriation of Church properties surged. The Nazi authorities said that the properties were needed for wartime necessities such as hospitals, or accommodation for refugees or children, but in fact used them for their own purposes. "Hostility to the state" was another common cause given for the confiscations, and the action of a single member of a monastery could result in seizure of the whole. The Jesuits were especially targeted. The Papal Nuncio Cesare Orsenigo and Cardinal Bertram complained constantly to the authorities but were told to expect more requisitions owing to war-time needs.

Figures like Bishops Clemens August Graf von Galen and Konrad von Preysing attempted to protect German priests from arrest. In Galen's 1941 anti-euthanasia sermons, he denounced the confiscations of church properties. He attacked the Gestapo for converting church properties to their own purposes – including use as cinemas and brothels. He protested against the mistreatment of Catholics in Germany: the arrests and imprisonment without legal process, the suppression of the monasteries, and the expulsion of religious orders.

On 22 March 1942, the German Bishops issued a pastoral letter on "The Struggle against Christianity and the Church". The letter launched a defence of human rights and the rule of law and accused the Reich Government of "unjust oppression and hated struggle against Christianity and the Church", despite the loyalty of German Catholics to the Fatherland, and brave service of Catholic soldiers:

For years a war has raged in our Fatherland against Christianity and the Church, and has never been conducted with such bitterness. Repeatedly the German bishops have asked the Reich Government to discontinue this fatal struggle; but unfortunately our appeals and our endeavours were without success.

In July 1942, Hitler said he viewed the concordat as obsolete, and intended to abolish it after the war, and only hesitated to withdraw Germany's representative from the Vatican out of "military reasons connected with the war":

Once the war is over, we will put a swift end to the Concordat. It will give me the greatest personal pleasure to point out to the Church all those occasions on which it has broken the terms of it. One need only recall the close co-operation between the Church and the killers of Heydrich. Catholic priests not only allowed them to hide in a church on the outskirts of Prague, but even allowed them to entrench themselves in the sanctuary of the altar.

In fact the Operation Anthropoid commandos were besieged in the Orthodox Saints Cyril and Methodius Cathedral.

== After World War II ==
Pius XII put a high priority on preserving the concordat from the Nazi era, although the bishops were unenthusiastic about it and the Allies considered the request inappropriate. After the war, the concordat remained in place and the Catholic Church was restored to its previous position.

When Lower Saxony passed a new school law, the Holy See complained that it violated the terms of the concordat. The federal government called upon the Federal Constitutional Court (Bundesverfassungsgericht) for clarification. In its ruling of 26 March 1957, the court decided that the circumstances surrounding the conclusion of the concordat did not invalidate it.

Declaring its lack of jurisdiction in matters of public international law and considering the fact that the German constitution grants authority in school matters to the state governments, the Constitutional Court ruled that the federal government had no authority to intervene. So while the federal government was obligated by the concordat, the court could not enforce its application in all areas because said court lacks legal authority to do so.

Critics also say that the concordat undermined the separation of church and state. The Weimar constitution (some of whose regulations, namely articles 136–139 and 141 were re-enacted in article 140 of the current German constitution) does not speak of a separation, but rather rules out any state religion while protecting religious freedom, religious holidays and leaving open the possibility of cooperation. However, a conflict continued between article 18 of the concordat and article 138 of the Weimar constitution.

== Assessment ==
Anthony Rhodes regarded Hitler's desire for a concordat with the Vatican as being driven principally by the prestige and respectability it brought to his regime abroad, while at the same time eliminating the opposition of the Centre Party. Rhodes took the view that if the survival of Catholic education and youth organisations was taken to be the principal aim of papal diplomacy during this period then the signing of the concordat to prevent greater evils was justified. Many of the Centre Party deputies were priests who had not been afraid to raise their voices and would almost certainly have voted against Hitler's assumption of dictatorial powers. The voluntary dissolution of the Centre Party removed that obstacle and Hitler had absolute power and brought respectability to the state: "Within six months of its birth, the Third Reich had been given full approval by the highest spiritual power on earth". Ian Kershaw considered the role of the Centre Party in Hitler's removal of almost all constitutional restraints as "particularly ignominious."

John Cornwell views Cardinal Pacelli as being an example of a "fellow traveller" of the Nazis who, through the concordat, was willing to accept the generosity of Hitler in the educational sphere (more schools, teachers and student slots), so long as the Church withdrew from the social and political sphere, at the same time as Jews were being dismissed from universities and Jewish student slots were being reduced. He argues that the Catholic Centre Party vote was decisive in the adoption of dictatorial powers by Hitler and that the party's subsequent dissolution was at Pacelli's prompting. Michael Phayer is of the opinion that a muted response to the attacks on Mosaic Jews was due to the concordat conditioned German bishops to avoid speaking out against anything that was not strictly related to church matters. Carlo Falconi described the concordat as "The Devil's Pact with Hitler". Albert Einstein in private conversation relating to the concordat said "Since when can one make a pact with Christ and Satan at the same time?" Daniel Goldhagen recalled how Hitler had said: "To attain our aim we should stop at nothing even if we must join forces with the devil", and that, in Goldhagen's view, is what Hitler did in agreeing the concordat with the church. Gordon Zahn felt that though the signing of the concordat was distasteful for Cardinal Pacelli, it had spared the church in Germany greater hardship and persecution.
