= Concordat of 1925 =

1925 treaty between Holy See and Second Polish Republic

The 1925 concordat (agreement) between the Holy See and the Second Polish Republic had 27 articles, which guaranteed the freedom of the Church and the faithful. It regulated the usual points of interests, Catholic instruction in primary schools and secondary schools, nomination of bishops, establishment of seminaries, a permanent nuncio in Warsaw, who also represents the interests of the Holy See in Gdańsk. It was considered one of the most favorable concordats for the Holy See, and would become a basis for many future concordats.

== Negotiations ==
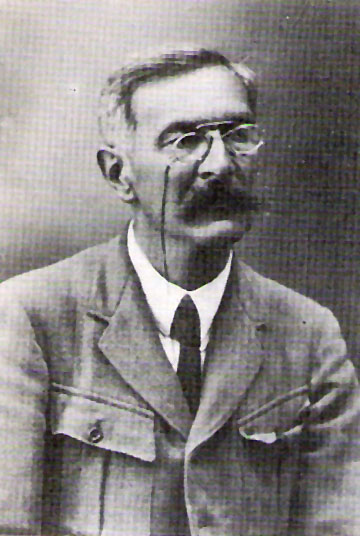
Stanisław Grabski, one of the principal Polish negotiators

The Roman Catholic religion was the religion of majority of the citizens in the Second Polish Republic (see also demographics of the Second Republic). The Polish constitution of 1921 stipulated in Article 114 that the "Roman Catholic faith, the religion of majority of the nation, takes first place among the equally important faiths in the country. The Roman Catholic Church governs itself. Relation to the Church will be determined based on the treaty with the Holy See, upon ratification by the Sejm (Polish parliament)."

The negotiations started in 1921, and the Polish side (Minister of Religion and Education Maciej Rataj, lawyer Władysław Abraham, and bishop Adolf Szelążek) drafted a proposal by 1923. Then the negotiations were taken over by Stanisław Grabski, who represented the endecja faction, then dominant in the government. The negotiations between Grabski and Francesco Borgongini Duca spanned four months and 23 meetings in Rome. Grabski's negotiations were criticized as too fast, secretive, and without consultation with the Polish clergy.

The concordat was signed on 10 February by Pietro Gasparri, Cardinal Secretary of State for the Holy See, and Stanisław Grabski and Wladyslaw Skrzyński for Poland. The text concordat was published in Poland in Dziennik Ustaw. It was presented to Sejm for ratification on 24 March. It was criticized by the representatives of non-Catholic minorities (such as the Ukrainians), as well as by the socialist and communist members of the parliament, but the center-right conservatives and Catholic representatives had the majority and were supportive of the treaty. It was ratified on 27 March.

== Content ==
Under the concordat, the Church enjoyed full protection of the State and prayed for the leaders of Poland during Sunday mass and on 3 May. Clerics made a solemn oath of allegiance to the Polish State. If clergy were under accusation, trial documents would be forwarded to ecclesiastical authorities if clergy were accused of crimes. If convicted, they would not serve incarceration in jails but would be handed over to Church authorities for internment in a monastery or convent. The concordat extended to the Latin Church in five ecclesiastical provinces: Gniezno–Poznań, Warsaw, Wilno, Lwów and Kraków. It applied as well to Eastern Catholics of the Ukrainian Greek Catholic Church in Lwów, and Przemyśl, and to the Armenian Catholic Church in Lwów. Thus two new archdioceses (Wilno and Kraków) were created. The pope announced them in the papal bull Vix dum Poloniae unitas of 28 October 1928.

For religious celebration in the specific rites, Canon law was required to be observed. Catholic instruction was mandatory in all public schools, except universities. In Article 24, the Church and State recognized each other's property rights seeming in part from the time of partition before 1918. This meant that property rights and real estate titles of the Church were respected. A later agreement was to define the status of expropriated Church properties, and until that time, the State would pay Church dotations for its clergy. The concordat stipulated that no part of Polish territory could be placed under the jurisdiction of a bishop outside of Poland or not of Polish citizenship.

On paper, the concordat seemed to be a victory for the church. But Polish bishops felt forced to take measures against early violations, in the area of marriage legislation and property rights. Pope Pius XI was supportive of this and of episcopal initiatives to have their own plenary meetings.

== Lithuania ==
The concordat caused a severe conflict between Holy See and Lithuania. The concordat established an ecclesiastical province in Wilno, thereby acknowledging Poland's claims to the city despite Lithuanian requests to govern the province directly from Rome. Lithuania and Poland had been in a bitter struggle for the city and the surrounding area since 1920 when the city was taken over by pro-Polish forces during Żeligowski's Mutiny. Lithuanians submitted a protest to the Holy See and recalled its representative there; the Holy See responded in kind and all diplomatic relations between Lithuania and the Holy See were terminated. In April 1926, Pope Pius XI unilaterally established and reorganized the Lithuanian ecclesiastical province without regard to Lithuanian demands and proposals. Popular outrage in response to the concordat was one of the reasons that the Lithuanian Christian Democratic Party, the leading pro-Catholic party in Lithuania, lost the majority in the 1926 parliamentary elections.

As a result, a weak coalition government was formed, which, in turn, inspired the 1926 Lithuanian coup d'état. Lithuanian relations with the Holy See were normalized a few months later, on 4 June 1927, when a concordat was signed between Cardinal Secretary of State Pietro Gasparri for the Holy See and Dr. Jurgis Šaulys for Lithuania. The improvements in 1927 were mostly due to the efforts of Prime Minister Augustinas Voldemaras.

== Annulment ==
During World War II, the Holy See had appointed German and Slovak priests to Polish parishes, violating the concordat. The actions were condemned by Polish government-in-exile, which considered it a betrayal: "Pius XII's decision is tantamount to the acceptance of illegal German demands and comprises an unfriendly act towards the Polish people".

On 12 September 1945, the communist-dominated Polish Provisional Government issued declaration that concordat is no longer valid, citing the violations by the Church. The view was not shared by the Holy See and many Polish priests, such as Stefan Wyszyński, who considered the concordat to have been ended by only the Polish side by a declaration. (Note: The Pope, according to Wyszynski, never ceased to recognize Polish sovereignty and did not make any personal or territorial changes, and the frequent Holy See press reports continued to report about Poland "as a country standing with the free states fighting for a better future". (Micewski, Cardinal Wyszinski, NY, 1984, p. 34) Still, state authorities tried to discredit Pope Pius XII in the eyes of Polish society. His actual speeches and messages to the people of Poland were not known in Poland. (Micewski, 418))

Not only Poland but also the other Eastern European countries under Soviet control cancelled their concordats with the Holy See after 1945, which can be seen as a part of the Persecutions against the Catholic Church during the pontificate of Pope Pius XII.
