= Pope Pius XI and Germany =

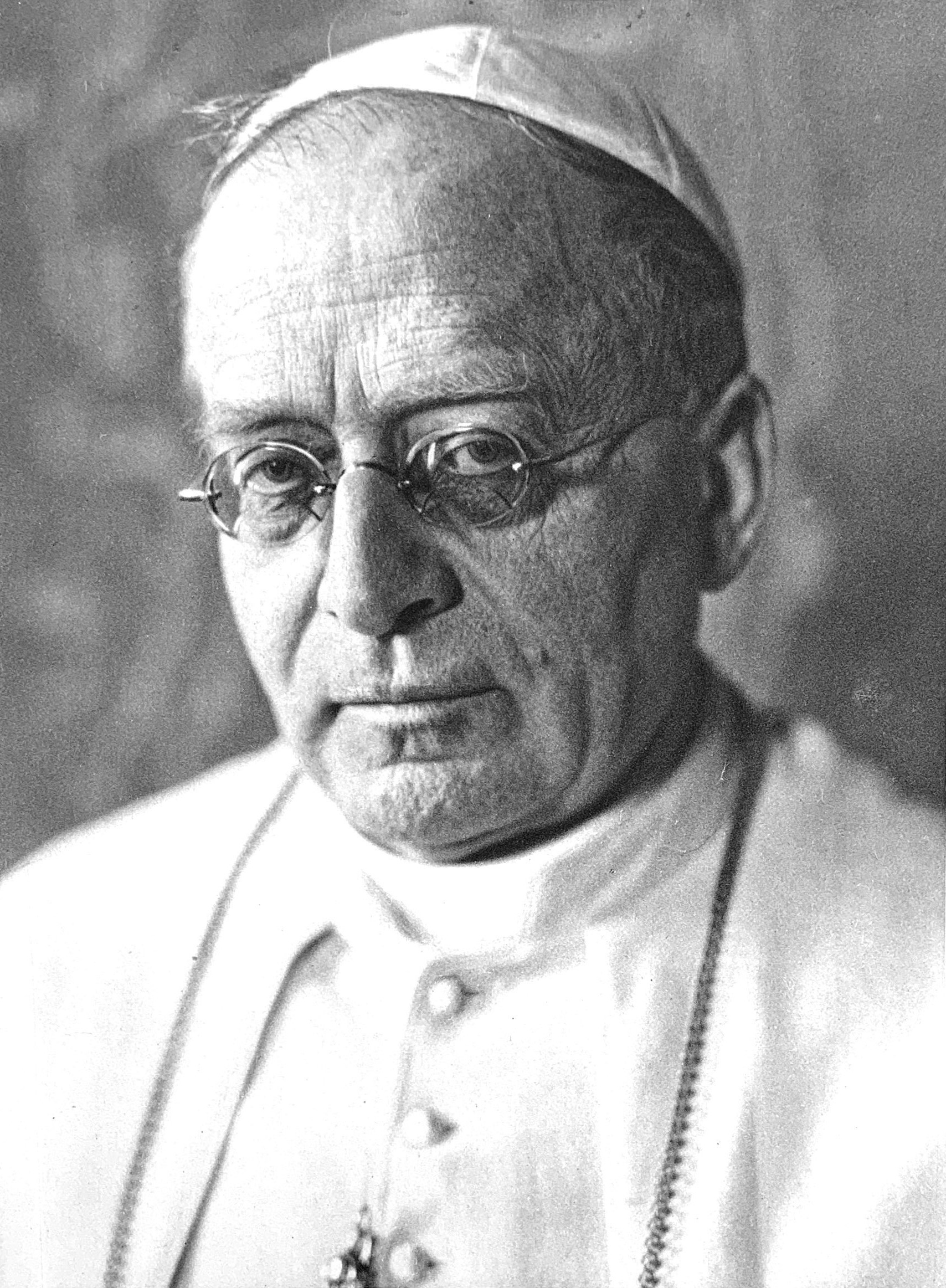
Pope Pius XI

During the pontificate of Pope Pius XI (1922–1939), the Weimar Republic transitioned into Nazi Germany. In 1933, the ailing President von Hindenburg appointed Adolf Hitler as Chancellor of Germany in a Coalition Cabinet, and the Holy See concluded the Reich concordat treaty with the still nominally functioning Weimar state later that year. Hoping to secure the rights of the Church in Germany, the Church agreed to a requirement that the clergy cease to participate in politics. The Hitler regime routinely violated the treaty, and launched a persecution of the Catholic Church in Germany.

Claiming jurisdiction over all collective and social activity, the Nazis interfered with Catholic schooling, youth groups, workers' clubs and cultural societies, and human rights abuses increased as the Nazis consolidated their power. In 1937, Pius XI issued the Mit brennender Sorge encyclical which denounced the regime's breaches of the Concordat, along with the racial and nationalist idolatry which underpinned Nazi ideology. Pius accused the Nazi Government of sowing "fundamental hostility to Christ and His Church", and noted on the horizon the "threatening storm clouds" of religious wars of extermination over Germany. Following the 1938 Kristallnacht pogrom, Pius joined Western leaders in condemning the pogrom, and antisemitism, sparking protest from the Nazis. Pius XI died in 1939, on the eve of World War II, and was succeeded by his Cardinal Secretary of State, Eugenio Pacelli, who took the name Pius XII, and was to govern the Church through the war, the Holocaust, and the remainder of the Nazi period.

== Diplomacy ==
=== Reichskonkordat ===
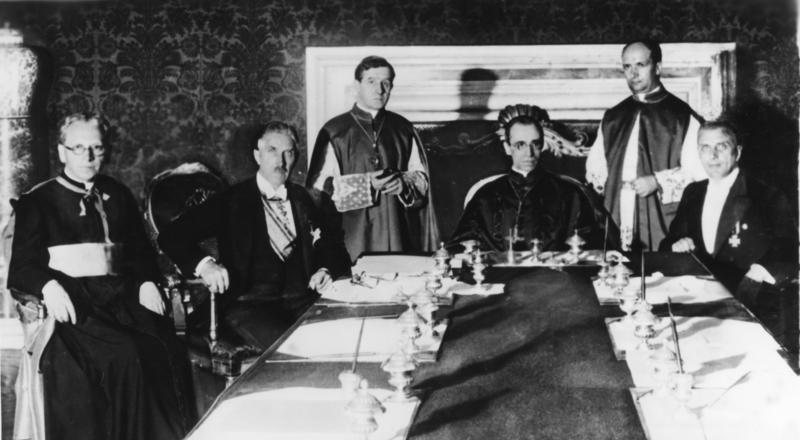
Signing of the Reichskonkordat on 20 July 1933. From left to right: German prelate Ludwig Kaas, German Vice-Chancellor Franz von Papen, representing Germany, Monsignor Giuseppe Pizzardo, Cardinal Pacelli, Monsignor Alfredo Ottaviani, German ambassador Rudolf Buttmann.

A threatening, though initially mainly sporadic persecution of the Catholic Church in Germany followed the 1933 Nazi takeover in Germany. In the dying days of the Weimar Republic, the newly appointed Chancellor Adolf Hitler moved quickly to eliminate Political Catholicism. Vice Chancellor Franz von Papen was dispatched to Rome to negotiate a Reich concordat with the Holy See. Ian Kershaw wrote that the Vatican was anxious to reach agreement with the new government, despite "continuing molestation of Catholic clergy, and other outrages committed by Nazi radicals against the Church and its organisations".

On 20 July 1933, the Vatican signed an agreement with Germany, the Reichskonkordat, partly in an effort to stop Nazi persecution of Catholic institutions.

The treaty was to be an extension of existing concordats already signed with Prussia and Bavaria. The Bavarian region, the Rhineland and Westphalia as well as parts in southwest Germany, were predominantly Catholic, and the church had previously enjoyed a degree of privilege there. North Germany was heavily Protestant, and Catholics had suffered some discrimination. In the late 1800s, Bismarck's Kulturkampf had been an attempt to almost eliminate Catholic institutions in Germany, or at least their strong connections outside of Germany. With this background, Catholic officials wanted a concordat strongly guaranteeing the church's freedoms. Once Hitler came to power and started enacting laws restricting movement of funds (making it impossible for German Catholics to send money to missionaries, for instance), restricting religious institutions and education, and mandating attendance at Hitler Youth functions (held on Sunday mornings to interfere with Church attendance), the need for a concordat seemed even more urgent to church officials.

The revolution of 1918 and the Weimar constitution of 1919 had thoroughly reformed the former relationship between state and churches. Therefore the Holy See, represented in Germany by Nuncio Eugenio Pacelli, the future Pope Pius XII, made unsuccessful attempts to obtain German agreement for such a treaty, and between 1930 and 1933 he attempted to initiate negotiations with representatives of successive German governments. Catholic politicians from the Centre Party repeatedly pushed for a concordat with the new German Republic. In February 1930 Pacelli became the Vatican's Secretary of State, and thus responsible for the Church's foreign policy, and in this position continued to work towards this 'great goal'.

Pius XI was eager to negotiate concordats with any country that was willing to do so, thinking that written treaties were the best way to protect the Church's rights against governments increasingly inclined to interfere in such matters. Twelve concordats were signed during his reign with various types of governments, including some German state governments, and with Austria.

On the level of the states, concordats were achieved with Bavaria (1924), Prussia (1929) and Baden (1932). On the national level, however, negotiations failed for several reasons: the fragility of the national government; opposition from Socialist and Protestant deputies in the Reichstag; and discord among the German bishops and between them and the Holy See. In particular the questions of denominational schools and pastoral work in the armed forces prevented any agreement on the national level, despite talks in the winter of 1932.

When Adolf Hitler became Chancellor of Germany on 30 January 1933 and asked for a concordat, Pius XI accepted. Negotiations were conducted on his behalf by Cardinal Eugenio Pacelli, who later became Pope Pius XII (1939 – 1958). The Reichskonkordat was signed by Pacelli and by the German government in June 1933, and included guarantees of liberty for the Church, independence for Catholic organisations and youth groups, and religious teaching in schools.

=== Negotiations with Hitler ===
On 30 January 1933, Adolf Hitler was appointed Chancellor. On 23 March 1933, his government was given dictatorial powers through an Enabling Act passed by all parties in the Reichstag except the Social Democrats and Communists (whose deputies had already been arrested). Hitler had obtained the votes of the Centre Party, led by Prelate Ludwig Kaas, by issuing oral guarantees of the party's continued existence and the autonomy of the Church and her educational institutions. He also promised good relations with the Holy See, which some interpret as a hint to a future concordat.

Cardinal Michael von Faulhaber wrote to Cardinal Pacelli on 10 April 1933 advising that defending the Jews would be wrong "because that would transform the attack on the Jews into an attack on the Church; and because the Jews are able to look after themselves".

Hitler met the representative of the German Bishops’ Conference, Bishop Wilhelm Berning of Osnabrück, on 26 April. At the meeting, Hitler declared:

I have been attacked because of my handling of the Jewish question. The Catholic Church considered the Jews pestilent for fifteen hundred years, put them in ghettos, etc., because it recognized the Jews for what they were. In the epoch of liberalism the danger was no longer recognized. I am moving back toward the time in which a fifteen-hundred-year-long tradition was implemented. I do not set race over religion, but I recognize the representatives of this race as pestilent for the state and for the Church, and perhaps I am thereby doing Christianity a great service by pushing them out of schools and public functions.

The notes of the meeting do not record any response by Bishop Berning. In the opinion of Martin Rhonheimer "This is hardly surprising: for a Catholic Bishop in 1933 there was really nothing terribly objectionable in this historically correct reminder. And on this occasion, as always, Hitler was concealing his true intentions." In April, Hitler sent his vice chancellor Franz von Papen, a Catholic nobleman and former member of the Centre Party, to Rome to offer negotiations about a Reichskonkordat. On behalf of Cardinal Pacelli, Ludwig Kaas, the out-going chairman of the Centre Party, negotiated the draft of the terms with Papen. One of Hitler's key conditions for agreeing to the concordat, in violation of earlier promises, had been the dissolution of the Centre Party, which occurred on 5 July.

Shortly before signing the Reichskonkordat on 20 July, Germany signed similar agreements with the major Protestant churches in Germany. The concordat was finally signed, by Pacelli for the Vatican and von Papen for Germany, on 20 July. The Reichskonkordat was ratified on 10 September 1933.

== Nazi persecution of the Catholic Church in Germany ==
A threatening, though initially mainly sporadic persecution of the Catholic Church in Germany followed the Nazi takeover. The Nazis claimed jurisdiction over all collective and social activity and interfered with Catholic schooling, youth groups, workers' clubs and cultural societies. The dissolution of the Catholic Centre Party, a former bulwark of the Republic, left modern Germany without a Catholic Party for the first time. Vice Chancellor Papen meanwhile negotiated a Reich Concordat with the Vatican, which prohibited clergy from participating in politics. Hitler, nevertheless, had a "blatant disregard" for the Concordat, wrote Paul O'Shea, and its signing was to him merely a first step in the "gradual suppression of the Catholic Church in Germany". Anton Gill wrote that "with his usual irresistible, bullying technique, Hitler then proceeded to take a mile where he had been given an inch" and closed all Catholic institutions whose functions weren't strictly religious:

It quickly became clear that [Hitler] intended to imprison the Catholics, as it were, in their own churches. They could celebrate mass and retain their rituals as much as they liked, but they could have nothing at all to do with German society otherwise. Catholic schools and newspapers were closed, and a propaganda campaign against the Catholics was launched.

— Extract from An Honourable Defeat by Anton Gill

Almost immediately after signing the Concordat, the Nazis promulgated their Law for the Prevention of Hereditarily Diseased Offspring – an offensive policy in the eyes of the Catholic Church. Days later, moves began to dissolve the Catholic Youth League. Political Catholicism was also among the targets of Hitler's 1934 Long Knives purge: the head of Catholic Action, Erich Klausener, Papen's speech writer and advisor Edgar Jung (also a Catholic Action worker); and the national director of the Catholic Youth Sports Association, Adalbert Probst. and former Centre Party Chancellor, Heinrich Brüning, narrowly escaped execution.

Clergy, religious sisters, and lay leaders began to be targeted, leading to thousands of arrests over the ensuing years, often on trumped up charges of currency smuggling or "immorality". Priests were watched closely and frequently denounced, arrested and sent to concentration camps. After constant confrontations, by late 1935 Bishop Clemens August Graf von Galen of Münster was urging a joint pastoral letter protesting an "underground war" against the church. In his history of the German Resistance, Hoffmann writes that, from the beginning:

[The Catholic Church] could not silently accept the general persecution, regimentation or oppression, nor in particular the sterilization law of summer 1933. Over the years until the outbreak of war Catholic resistance stiffened until finally its most eminent spokesman was the Pope himself with his encyclial Mit brennender Sorge... of 14 March 1937, read from all German Catholic pulpits. Clemens August Graf von Galen, Bishop of Munster, was typical of the many fearless Catholic speakers. In general terms, therefore, the churches were the only major organisations to offer comparatively early and open resistance: they remained so in later years.

— Extract from The History of the German Resistance 1933-1945 by Peter Hoffmann

== Encyclicals ==
Pius XI saw the rising tide of totalitarianism with alarm and delivered three papal encyclicals challenging the new creeds: against Italian Fascism Non abbiamo bisogno (1931; "We Do Not Need to Acquaint You"); against Nazism Mit brennender Sorge (1937; "With Deep Anxiety"); and against atheistic Communism Divini redemptoris (1937; "Divine Redeemer"). He also challenged the extremist nationalism of the Action Francaise movement and anti-semitism in the United States. Non abbiamo bisogno condemned Italian fascism’s "pagan worship of the State" and "revolution which snatches the young from the Church and from Jesus Christ, and which inculcates in its own young people hatred, violence and irreverence."

=== Mit brennender Sorge ===
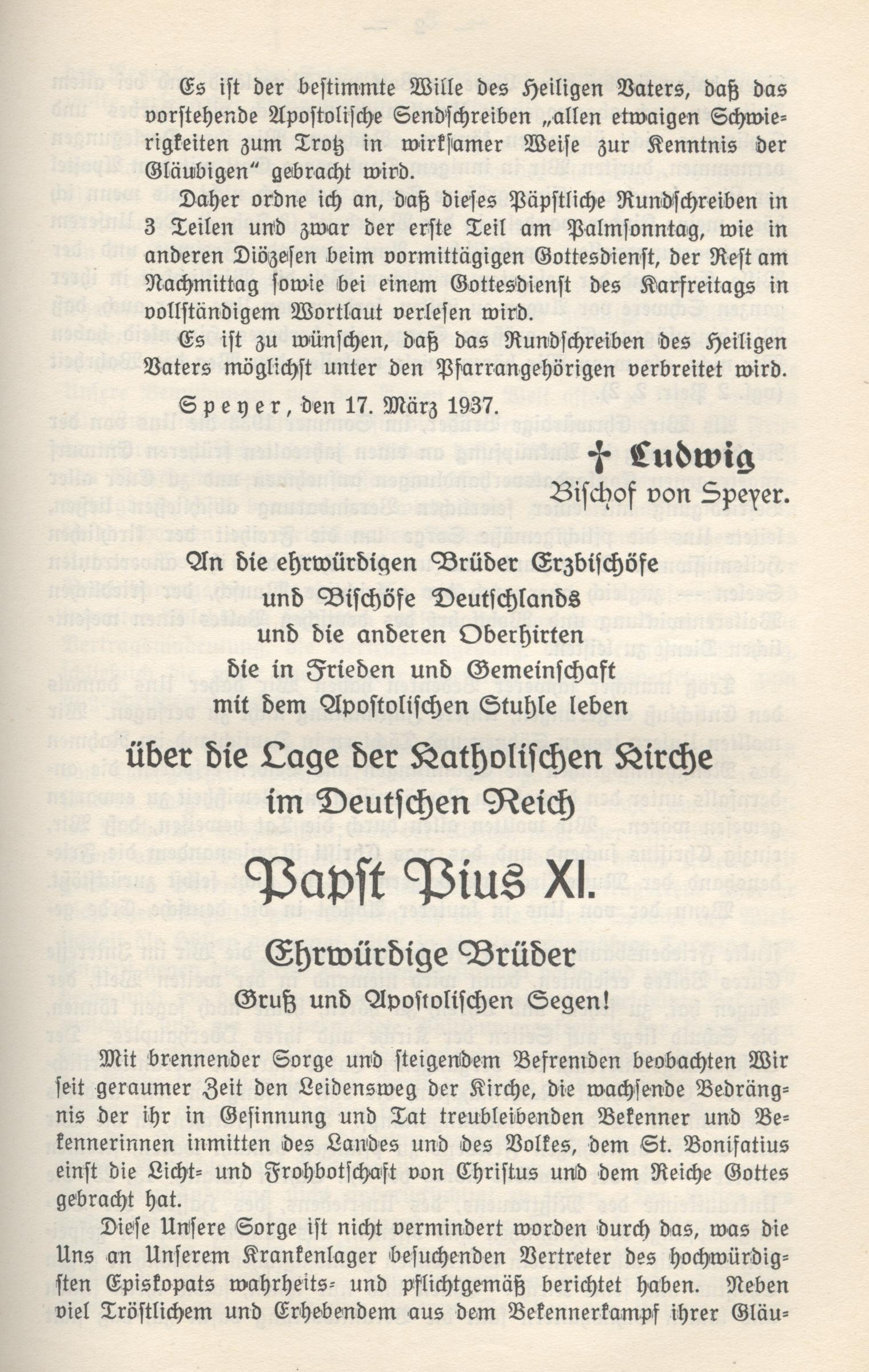
Mit brennender Sorge, issued by Pius XI in 1937, was the first papal encyclical written in German. In its content, the Pope accused the Nazi regime of sowing "fundamental hostility to Christ and His Church".

The Nazis claimed jurisdiction over all collective and social activity, interfering with Catholic schooling, youth groups, workers' clubs and cultural societies. By early 1937, the church hierarchy in Germany, which had initially attempted to co-operate with the new government, had become highly disillusioned. In March, Pope Pius XI issued the Mit brennender Sorge encyclical – accusing the Nazi Government of violations of the 1933 Concordat, and further that it was sowing the "tares of suspicion, discord, hatred, calumny, of secret and open fundamental hostility to Christ and His Church". The Pope noted on the horizon the "threatening storm clouds" of religious wars of extermination over Germany. He asserted the inviolability of human rights and expressed deep concern at the Nazi regime's flouting of the 1933 Concordat, its treatment of Catholics and abuse of Christian values.

Copies had to be smuggled into Germany so they could be read from the pulpit The encyclical, the only one ever written in German, was addressed to German bishops and was read in all parishes of Germany. The actual writing of the text is credited to Munich Cardinal Michael von Faulhaber and to the Cardinal Secretary of State, Eugenio Pacelli, who later became Pope Pius XII.

Nazi violations of the Reichskonkordat had escalated to include physical violence. Drafted by the future Pope Pius XII and read from the pulpits of all German Catholic churches, it criticized Hitler and condemned Nazi persecution and ideology and has been characterized by scholars as the "first great official public document to dare to confront and criticize Nazism" and "one of the greatest such condemnations ever issued by the Vatican." This encyclical condemned particularly the paganism of Nazi ideology, the myth of race and blood, and fallacies in the Nazi conception of God:

Whoever exalts race, or the people, or the State, or a particular form of State, or the depositories of power, or any other fundamental value of the human community – however necessary and honorable be their function in worldly things – whoever raises these notions above their standard value and divinizes them to an idolatrous level, distorts and perverts an order of the world planned and created by God; he is far from the true faith in God and from the concept of life which that faith upholds."

The Nazis responded with, an intensification of their campaign against the churches, beginning around April. There were mass arrests of clergy and church presses were expropriated.

=== Impact and consequences ===
According to Eamon Duffy, "The impact of the encyclical was immense" and the "infuriated" Nazis increased their persecution of Catholics and the Church by initiating a "long series" of persecutions of clergy and other measures.

Gerald Fogarty wrote that "in the end, the encyclical had little positive effect, and if anything only exacerbated the crisis." The American ambassador reported that it "had helped the Catholic Church in Germany very little but on the contrary has provoked the Nazi state ... to continue its oblique assault upon Catholic institutions." Frank J. Coppa wrote that the encyclical was viewed by the Nazis as "a call to battle against the Reich" and that Hitler was furious and "vowed revenge against the Church".

The German police confiscated as many copies as they could and called it "high treason". According to John Vidmar, Nazi reprisals against the Church in Germany followed thereafter, including "staged prosecutions of monks for homosexuality, with the maximum of publicity". According to Thomas Bokenkotter, "the Nazis were infuriated, and in retaliation closed and sealed all the presses that had printed it and took numerous vindictive measures against the Church, including staging a long series of immorality trials of the Catholic clergy." According to Eamon Duffy "The impact of the encyclical was immense, and it dispelled at once all suspicion of a Fascist Pope." According to Owen Chadwick, the "infuriated" Nazis increased their persecution of Catholics and the Church.

While numerous German Catholics who participated in the secret printing and distribution of Mit brennender Sorge went to jail and concentration camps, the press in the Western democracies remained silent, which Pius XI called as "a conspiracy of silence". The pope left Rome to avoid meeting Hitler during the dictator's state visit to Italy in May 1938, denounced the display of Swastika flags in Rome, and closed the Vatican museums.

== Teachings against Nazi antisemitism ==
As the extreme nature of Nazi racial antisemitism became obvious, and as Mussolini in the late 1930s began imitating Hitler's anti-Jewish race laws in Italy, Pius XI was perturbed. In the 1930s, he urged Mussolini to ask Hitler to restrain the anti-Semitic actions taking place in Germany. When the newly installed Nazi Government began to instigate its program of antisemitism, Pope Pius ordered the Papal Nuncio in Berlin, Cesare Orsenigo, to "look into whether and how it may be possible to become involved" in their aid. Orsenigo proved a poor instrument in this regard, concerned more with the anti-church policies of the Nazis and how these might effect German Catholics, than with taking action to help German Jews.

In 1937, he issued the Mit brennender Sorge (German: "With burning concern") encyclical, in which he asserted the inviolability of human rights. It was written partly in response to the Nuremberg Laws, and condemned racial theories and the mistreatment of people based on race. It repudiated Nazi racial theory and the "so-called myth of race and blood". It denounced "whoever exalts race, or the people, or the State ... above their standard value and divinizes them to an idolatrous level"; spoke of divine values independent of "space country and race" and a Church for "all races"; and said, "None but superficial minds could stumble into concepts of a national God, of a national religion; or attempt to lock within the frontiers of a single people, within the narrow limits of a single race, God, the Creator of the universe. The document noted on the horizon over Germany the "threatening storm clouds" of religious wars of extermination.

Following the Anschluss and the extension of antisemitic laws in Germany, Jewish refugees sought sanctuary outside the Reich. In Rome, Pius XI told a group of Belgian pilgrims on 6 September 1938 that it was not possible for Christians to participate in anti-Semitism: "Mark well that in the Catholic Mass, Abraham is our Patriarch and forefather. Anti-Semitism is incompatible with the lofty thought which that fact expresses. It is a movement with which we Christians can have nothing to do. No, no, I say to you it is impossible for a Christian to take part in anti-Semitism. It is inadmissible. Through Christ and in Christ we are the spiritual progeny of Abraham. Spiritually, we [Christians] are all Semites." These comments were subsequently published worldwide but had little resonance at the time in the secular media.

On 11 November 1938, following Kristallnacht, Pope Pius XI joined Western leaders in condemning the pogrom. In response, the Nazis organised mass demonstrations against Catholics and Jews in Munich, and the Bavarian Gauleiter Adolf Wagner declared before 5,000 protesters: "Every utterance the Pope makes in Rome is an incitement of the Jews throughout the world to agitate against Germany." On 21 November, in an address to the world's Catholics, the Pope rejected the Nazi claim of racial superiority, and insisted instead that there was only a single human race. Robert Ley, the Nazi Minister of Labour, declared the following day in Vienna: "No compassion will be tolerated for the Jews. We deny the Pope's statement that there is but one human race. The Jews are parasites." Catholic leaders including Cardinal Schuster of Milan, Cardinal van Roey in Belgium and Cardinal Verdier in Paris backed the Pope's strong condemnation of Kristallnacht.

Pius XI's Secretary of State, Cardinal Pacelli, made some 55 protests against Nazi policies, including its "ideology of race". Pacelli succeeded Pius XI on the eve of war in 1939. Taking the name Pius XII, he also employed diplomacy to aid the victims of Nazi persecution, and directed his Church to provide discreet aid to Jews. His first encyclical Summi Pontificatus again spoke against racism, with specific reference to Jews: "there is neither Gentile nor Jew, circumcision nor uncircumcision."

== Assessment ==
Peter Kent writes:

By the time of his death ... Pius XI had managed to orchestrate a swelling chorus of Church protests against the racial legislation and the ties that bound Italy to Germany. He had single-mindedly continued to denounce the evils of the Nazi regime at every possible opportunity and feared above all else the re-opening of the rift between Church and State in his beloved Italy. He had, however, few tangible successes. There had been little improvement in the position of the Church in Germany and there was growing hostility to the Church in Italy on the part of the fascist regime. Almost the only positive result of the last years of his pontificate was a closer relationship with the liberal democracies and yet, even this was seen by many as representing a highly partisan stance on the part of the Pope. In the age of appeasement, the pugnacious obstinacy of Pius XI was held to be contributing more to the polarization of Europe than to its pacification.

== See also ==
- Catholic Church and Nazi Germany
- Catholic resistance to Nazi Germany
