= Germany–Holy See relations =

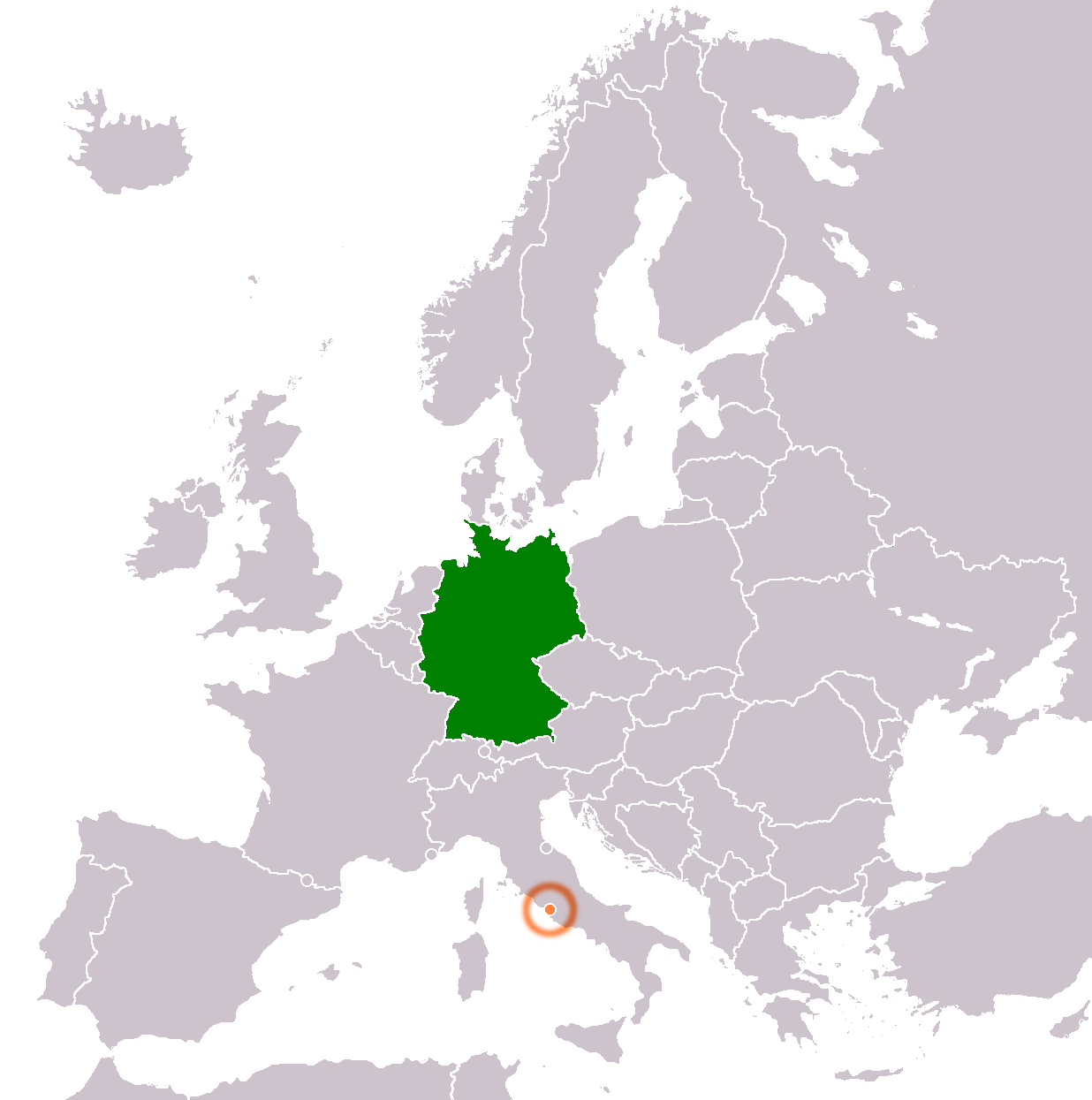

- Germany: Holy See

Formal diplomatic relations between the Holy See and the current Federal Republic of Germany date to the 1951 and the end of the Allied occupation. Historically the Vatican has carried out foreign relations through nuncios, beginning with the Apostolic Nuncio to Cologne and the Apostolic Nuncio to Austria. Following the dissolution of the Holy Roman Empire and the Congress of Vienna, an Apostolic Nuncio to Bavaria replaced that of Cologne and that mission remained in Munich through several governments. From 1920 the Bavarian mission existed alongside the Apostolic Nuncio to Germany in Berlin, with which it was merged in 1934.

== Current relations ==
Former Pope Benedict XVI (Joseph Ratzinger) was a German (from Bavaria).

In 2009, German Chancellor Angela Merkel, in her nine-page address at the Bavarian Catholic Academy's conference on "Political Action based on Christian Responsibility," noted that Benedict XVI's new encyclical Caritas in Veritate points to the way forward in the Great Recession.

She was particularly impressed by the passage that read: "The primary capital to be safeguarded and valued is man, the human person in his or her integrity."

== Historical relations ==
=== Middle Ages ===
As soon as 496, Frankish King Clovis I was baptized together with many members of his household. In contrast to the eastern German tribes, who became Arian Christians, he became a Catholic. Following the example of their king, many Franks were baptized too, but their Catholicism was mixed with pagan rites.

The investiture controversy was the most significant conflict between Church and state in medieval Europe. In the 11th and 12th centuries, a series of popes challenged the authority of European monarchies over control of appointments, or investitures, of church officials such as bishops and abbots.

=== Early modern history ===
On September 25, 1555, Charles V, Holy Roman Emperor and the forces of the Schmalkaldic League signed the Peace of Augsburg to officially end the religious wars between the Catholics and the Protestants. This treaty legalized the partitioning of the Holy Roman Empire into Catholic and Protestant territories.

Under the treaty, the religion of the ruler (either Lutheranism or Catholicism) determined the religion of his subjects. This policy is widely referred to by the Latin phrase, cuius regio, eius religio ("whose reign, his religion", or "in the prince's land, the prince's religion"). Families were given a period in which they were free to emigrate to regions where their desired religion prevailed.

=== Modern history ===
│
1500
│
1525
│
1550
│
1575
│
1600
│
1625
│
1650
│
1675
│
1700
│
1725
│
1750
│
1775
│
1800
│
1825
│
1850
│
1875
│
1900
│
1925
│
1950
│
1975
│
2000
│
2025
│
2050
│
2075
│
2100
HRE Court, Upper Germany and Austria (Vienna)
HRE Diet (Regensburg, Resident in Vienna)
Lower Germany and Cologne (Cologne)
end HRE (incl. German Kingdom)
Bavaria, all German states (Munich)
Prussia (Berlin)
German Reich (Berlin)
end German Reich
FR West Germany (Bonn)
FR Germany (Berlin)
mayority Roman-Catholic
mayority Lutheran (or formerly mayority Lutheran respectively)

==== Post-French revolution era ====
In the war of the First Coalition, revolutionary France defeated the coalition of Prussia, Austria, Spain, and Britain. One result was the cession of the Rhineland to France by the Treaty of Basel in 1795.

Eight years later, in 1803, to compensate the princes of the annexed territories, a set of mediatisations was carried out, which brought about a major redistribution of territorial sovereignty within the Empire.

==== Kulturkampf ====
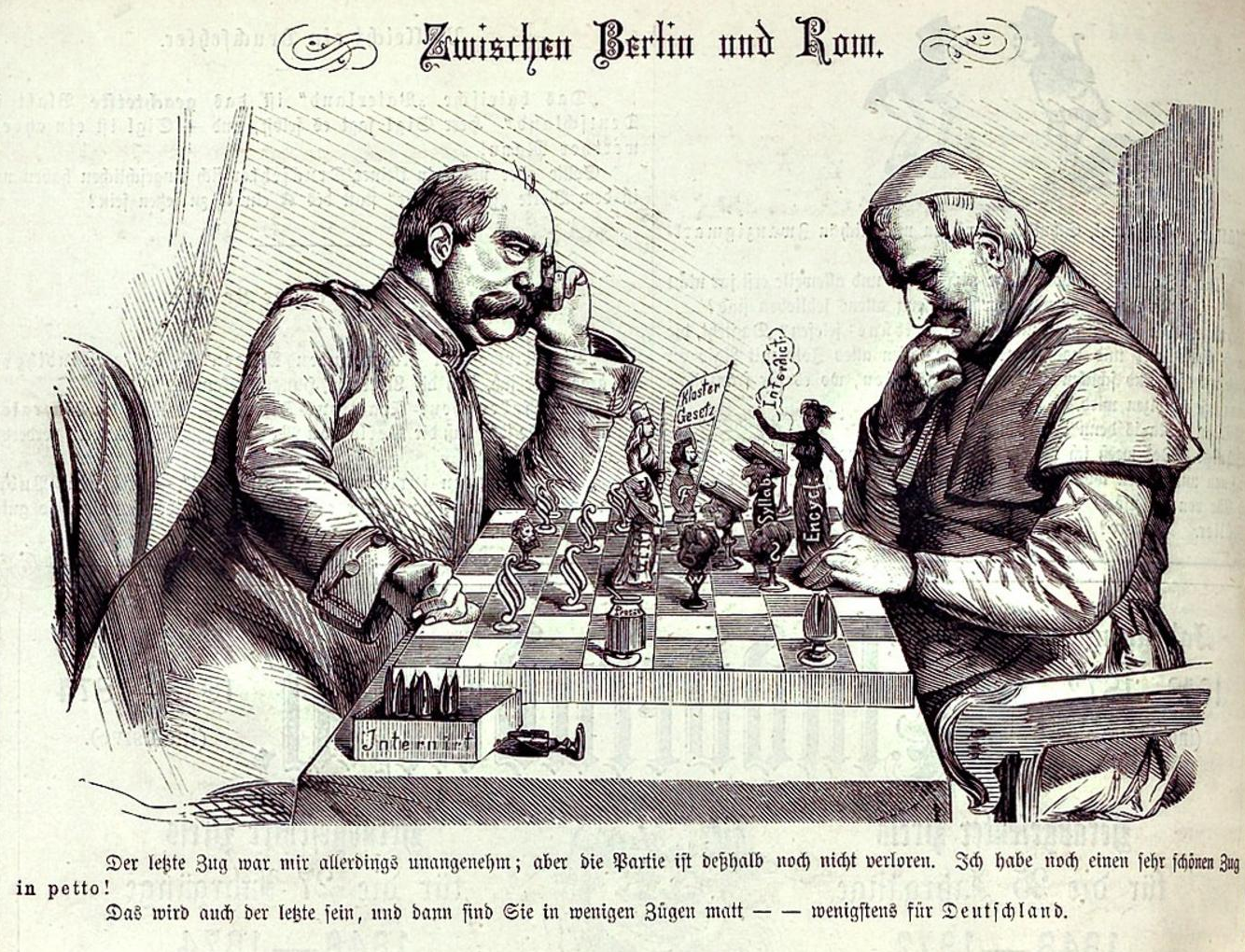
Between Berlin and Rome, Bismarck (left) confronts the Pope, 1875

A main theme of European history in the 18th and especially 19th century was the secularization of society which was vehemently opposed by the Catholic Church. In Germany, this process had its first culmination in the German revolutions of 1848–49 and, after their suppression, gained new momentum with the establishment of liberal governments in various German states in the 1850s and 1860s and in the empire in the 1870s. The Catholic Church, an outspoken opponent of Liberalism, had opposed German unification under predominantly Protestant Prussian leadership and the Church was seen as defending the oppressed Catholic Polish minority which German nationalists saw as a threat. Therefore, Chancellor Bismarck regarded the Church as a threat to the newly founded empire, especially after establishment of a Catholic political party which became a strong opposition in parliament. The Liberals, particularly in light of new Catholic dogmas promulgated under Pope Pius IX in the 1860s and at the Council of 1870, had always considered the Catholic Church as an enemy of progress.

Laws enacted in the state of Prussia and in the empire in the early 1870s to curb Catholic influence in public affairs met with open resistance of the Church leading to heated public debates in the media and in the parliaments during which the term “Kulturkampf” gained widespread currency. Diplomatic ties with the Vatican were cut and additional laws were passed to quell Catholic opposition. This only resulted in more support by the Catholic population and more resistance by the Church. During the Kulturkampf, four bishops and 185 priests in defiance of the laws were trialed and imprisoned and many more were fined or went into exile.

After the death of Pius IX in 1878, Bismarck took up negotiations with more conciliatory Pope Leo XIII who proclaimed the end of the Kulturkampf on 23 May 1887.

==== Third Reich ====
After it failed to seize control of the Bavarian state in 1923, the nascent Nazi Party, by that time sharing the Bavarian bishops' view about the incompatibility of National Socialism and Christianity, no longer wanted to court Catholics.

Hitler wanted to broaden its base. The Party leadership became anti-Catholic (especially attacking the bishops) and its inherent anti-Semitism became more virulent. To counter this, the bishops adopted a conditional ban or prohibition in regard to Catholic membership in the Party, which later (as Nazism spread throughout Germany) varied from diocese to diocese.

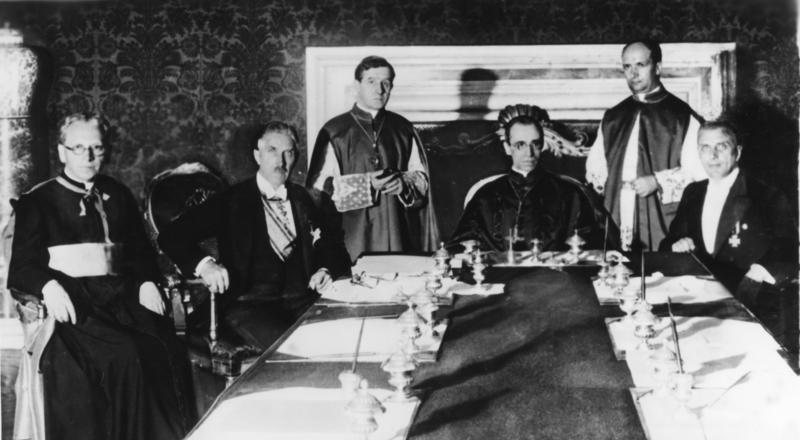
Signing of the Reichskonkordat on 20 July 1933. From left to right: German prelate Ludwig Kaas, German Vice-Chancellor Franz von Papen, representing Germany, Monsignor Giuseppe Pizzardo, Cardinal Pacelli, Monsignor Alfredo Ottaviani, German ambassador Rudolf Buttmann.

Pius XI was eager to negotiate concordats with any country that was willing to do so, thinking that written treaties were the best way to protect the Church's rights against governments increasingly inclined to interfere in such matters. Twelve concordats were signed during his reign with various types of governments, including some German state governments. When Hitler became Chancellor of Germany in January 1933 and asked for a concordat, Pius XI accepted. Negotiations were conducted on his behalf by Cardinal Eugenio Pacelli, who later became Pope Pius XII (1939–1958). The Reichskonkordat was signed by Pacelli and by the German government in June 1933 and included guarantees of liberty for the Church, independence for Catholic organisations and youth groups, and religious teaching in schools. The German bishops wanted the concordat, and its swift passage gave the new Nazi regime a considerable degree of legitimacy for its good behaving in foreign policy despite its long history of violent rhetoric. Kent says, "Without a doubt, the concordat was a diplomatic victory for Hitler. It was his first major success in the field of foreign policy, and it indicated to the world that the German Chancellor was politically reliable and trustworthy." Within a few weeks, however, serious friction arose over Nazi threats to the status of the Church. In particular there were issues of the oppression of Catholics of Jewish descent, dismissal of Catholics from the civil service, freedom of expression for Catholic newspapers, pressure on Catholic schools and organizations, sterilization laws, and persecution of nuns and priests.

==== Mit brennender Sorge ====
Pius XI responded to ever increasing Nazi hostility to Christianity by issuing in 1937 the encyclical Mit brennender Sorge condemning the Nazi ideology of racism and totalitarianism and Nazi violations of the concordat. The encyclical, written in German, was addressed to German bishops and was read in all parishes of Germany. The encyclical was kept secret in an attempt to ensure the unhindered public reading of its contents in all the Catholic Churches of Germany. This encyclical condemned particularly the paganism of National Socialist ideology, the myth of race and blood, and fallacies in the Nazi conception of God.

"Whoever exalts race, or the people, or the State, or a particular form of State, or the depositories of power, or any other fundamental value of the human community – however necessary and honorable be their function in worldly things – whoever raises these notions above their standard value and divinizes them to an idolatrous level, distorts and perverts an order of the world planned and created by God; he is far from the true faith in God and from the concept of life which that faith upholds."

After the encyclical German-Vatican relations deteriorated rapidly, and were marked by violent Nazi street demonstrations against two German bishops. Pius XI continued to criticize Nazi policies sharply and publicly, but he also avoided a complete rupture. He died at the peak of tension, in February 1939.

==== Pius XII ====
While Pope Pius XII was strongly opposed to Nazism, he was too quiet regarding the Holocaust according to later critics.

Jacques Adler, however, has examined the transcripts of broadcasts over the Vatican Radio, which reached a wide audience over short wave. He argues that it exposed Nazi persecution of the Church and opposed collaboration with Nazism. It appealed to Catholics to remain true to their faith's injunctions: to defend the sanctity of life and the unity of humankind. In so doing the Pope pursued a policy of spiritual resistance to Nazi ideology and racism.

=== Contemporary history ===
==== East Germany ====
After World War II, the Catholics in the zone occupied by the Soviet army found themselves under a militantly atheist government. Many parishes were cut off from their dioceses in the western part of Germany. The Soviet zone eventually declared itself a sovereign nation, the German Democratic Republic (GDR). The GDR's constitution proclaimed the freedom of religious belief, but in reality the new state tried to abolish religion.

The Catholic Church was small in East German (most people were Protestants). It had a fully functioning episcopal hierarchy that was in full accord with the Vatican. During the early postwar years, tensions were high. The Catholic Church as a whole and particularly the bishops were resistant to both the regime and Marxist ideology, and the state allowed the bishops to lodge protests, which they did on issues such as abortion. The bishops were, however, closely observed by the Stasi.

After 1945, the Church did fairly well in integrating Catholic exiles from lands to the east (which were given to Poland) and adjusting its institutional structures against the threats of an atheistic state. Within the Church, this meant an increasingly hierarchical structure, whereas in the area of religious education, press, and youth organisations, a system of temporary staff was developed, one that took into account the special situation of the Caritas, a charity organisation. They were hardly affected by Communist attempts to force them into line. By 1950, therefore, there existed a Catholic subsociety that was well adjusted to prevailing specific conditions and capable of maintaining Catholic identity.

With a generational change in the episcopacy taking place in the early 1980s, the state hoped for better relations with the new bishops, but the new bishops instead showed increasing independence from the state by holding unauthorised mass meetings, promoting international ties in discussions with theologians abroad, and hosting ecumenical conferences. The new bishops became less politically oriented and more involved in pastoral care and attention to spiritual concerns. The government responded by limiting international contacts for bishops.

== See also ==
- Apostolic Nuncio to Germany
- Catholic Church and Nazi Germany
- Roman Catholicism in Germany
- Pope Pius IX and Germany
- Pope Pius XI and Germany
- Pope Pius XII and the Holocaust
- Pope Pius XII and the German resistance
