= Klaus Scholder =

German historian

Klaus Scholder (January 12, 1930 – April 10, 1985) was a German ecclesiastical historian and professor of history at the University of Tübingen.

== Life ==
Scholder was the son of Erlangen professor of Chemistry Rudolf Scholder. After his high school graduation, he studied Germanistics and Theology at the University of Tübingen and at Göttingen. After his academic promotion and his ordination as an evangelical pastor, he worked for the FDP's Bundestag faction. In 1958 he took up a post with the Evangelical-Lutheran Church in Württemberg and at first was a parish steward at Bad Überkingen, only to move on to the Evangelical Priory of Tübingen in 1959. After his habilitation he worked as a private docent at the University of Tübingen and in 1968 received a professorship for Ecclesiastic Order.

His work focussed on the Kirchenkampf, the intra-confessional struggle of German Christians during Hitler's Third Reich, on which he wrote Die Kirchen und das Dritte Reich (The Churches and the Third Reich). The two volumes are still considered a standard on the topic in Germany. A third volume was completed posthumously in 2001 by his student Gerhard Besier, now Director of the Hannah Arendt Institute for Research into Totalitarianism in Dresden.

== Political activities ==
Influenced by Karl Georg Pfleiderer, Scholder joined the FDP/DVP. He was a major contributor to the cultural and religious points of view in the FDP's "Berlin Agenda" of 1957. In the late 1960s he was chairman of the FDP/DVP Tübingen District Association. In the 1970s, he was vice chairman of the Friedrich Naumann Foundation.

== Selected works ==
- Die Verwirklichung des Imaginativen in den Romanen Jean Pauls (The Incarnation of the Imaginative in the Novels by Jean Paul), dissertation, Tübingen 1956.
- Die Problematik der politischen Verantwortung in unserer jüngsten Geschichte (The Difficulty of political Responsibility within our most recent Past), 1959.
- Ursprünge und Probleme der Bibelkritik im 17. Jahrhundert (Origin and Problems of the Bible Criticism in the 17th Century), habilitation, Tübingen 1965.
- Die Kirchen und das Dritte Reich. Bd. 1: Vorgeschichte und Zeit der Illusionen, 1918–1934 (The Churches and the Third Reich, vol. 1: Case History and Time of Illusions). Berlin 1977.
- Karl Georg Pfleiderer: Der liberale Landrat, Politiker und Diplomat (K. G. Pfleiderer: the liberal District Administrator, Politician and Diplomat), Stuttgart 1979
- Die Kirchen und das Dritte Reich. Bd. 2: Das Jahr der Ernüchterung 1934 (The Churches and the Third Reich, vol. 2: 1934 - the Year of Disenchantment) (postum), Berlin 1985.
- Die Kirchen zwischen Republik und Gewaltherrschaft. Gesammelte Aufsätze (The Churches between Republic and Totalitarianism), ed. Karl Otmar von Aretin and Gerhard Besier, unshortened and corrected edition of the 1988 original, Berlin: Ullstein, 1991. ISBN 3-548-33148-3.
