= Divini Redemptoris =

1937 encyclical by Pope Pius XI

Divini Redemptoris Latin for 'Of a Divine Redeemer' Encyclical of Pope Pius XI
- Signature date: 19 March 1937
- Subject: On Atheistic Communism
- Text: In Latin; In English

Divini Redemptoris (from the incipit "Divini Redemptoris promissio", Latin for "the promise of a Divine Redeemer") is a 1937 encyclical issued by Pope Pius XI. In this encyclical, the pope sets out to "expose once more in a brief synthesis the principles of atheistic Communism as they are manifested chiefly in Bolshevism".

Mariano Cordovani O.P. (February 25, 1883 – April 4, 1950) professor of dogmatic theology at the College of Saint Thomas, the future Pontifical University of Saint Thomas Aquinas, Angelicum from 1912 to 1921 and Master of the Sacred Palace under Pope Pius XI contributed especially to the encyclical and afterward published his Appunti sul comunismo moderno treating the Church's position on communism. It was published on 19 March 1937.

== Description ==
The encyclical describes communism as "a system full of errors and sophisms" that "subverts the social order, because it means the destruction of its foundations".

Pius XI goes on to contrast communism with the civitas humana (ideal human civilization), which is marked by love, respect for human dignity, economic justice, and the rights of workers. Pope Pius XI blames industrialists and employers who do not adequately support their workers for creating a climate of discontent in which people are tempted to embrace communism. He refers to two earlier papal writings on this topic, Rerum novarum and Quadragesimo anno.

The work expresses concern at the growth of communism in the Soviet Union, Spain, and Mexico, and it criticises the Western press for its alleged "conspiracy of silence" in failing to cover such events in those countries. It was published five days after the publication of the more prominent Mit brennender Sorge encyclical, which condemned the German Nazi regime and the ideology of Nazism.

== Notes ==
=== References ===
- Pius XI (March 19, 1937). Divini Redemptoris.
