= Martin Rhonheimer =

Swiss Catholic priest and philosopher (born 1950)

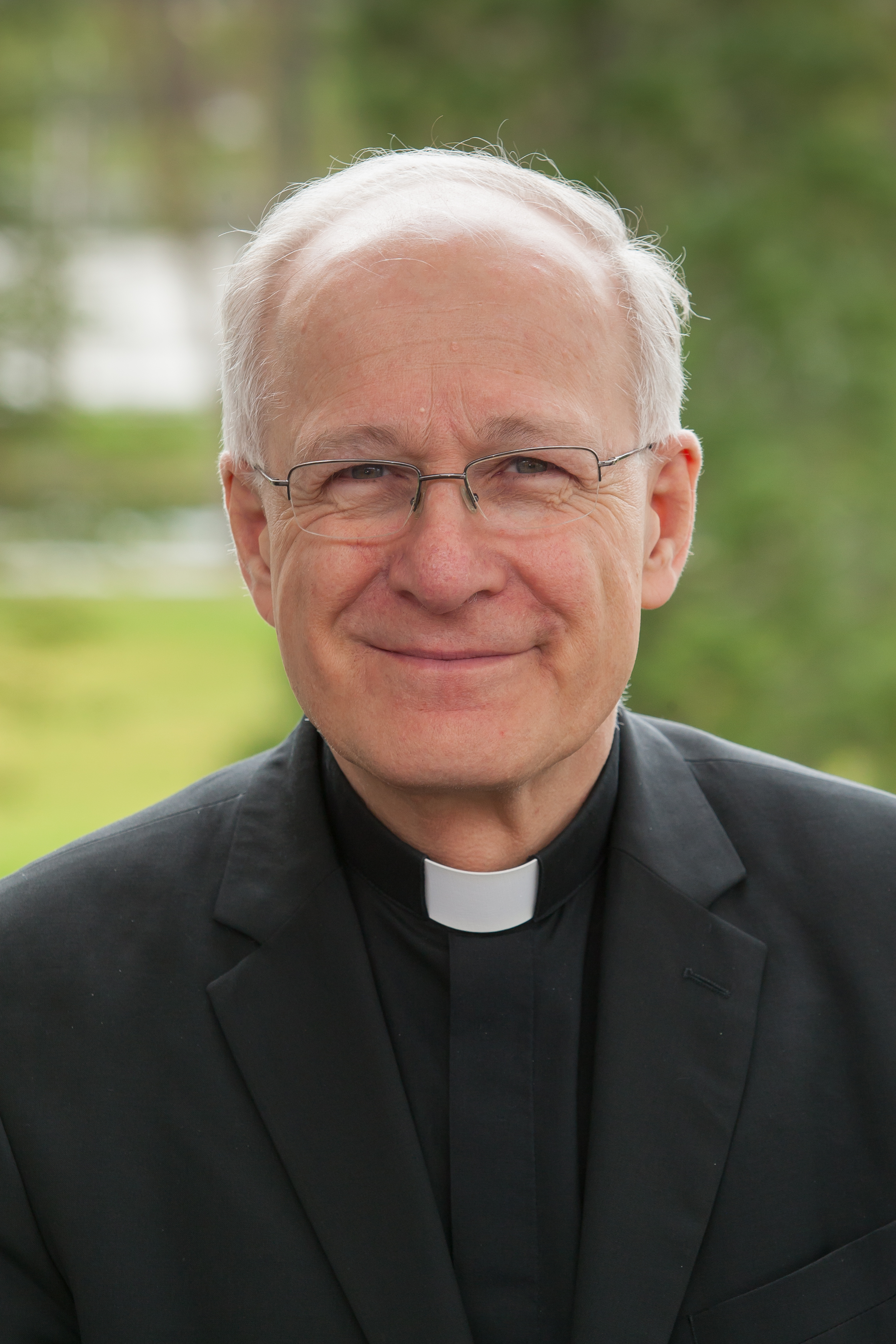
Rhonheimer in 2018

Martin Rhonheimer (born 1950 in Zurich, Switzerland) is a Swiss political philosophy professor and priest of the Catholic personal prelature Opus Dei. As of July 2017 he is teaching professor at the Opus Dei-affiliated Pontifical University of the Holy Cross in Rome.

== Life ==
Rhonheimer was born 1950 in Zurich, Switzerland into a Swiss Jewish family. He studied philosophy, history, political science and theology in Zurich and Rome.

In 1974, he joined the personal prelature Opus Dei as a numerary member. In 1983, he was ordained a priest.

As of July 2017 he teaches at the Opus Dei-affiliated Pontifical University of the Holy Cross in Rome. His main interests are in political philosophy, ethics, the history of liberalism.

== Opinions ==
Rhonheimer's regular editorials have been published by the German FAZ and Neue Zürcher Zeitung.

=== Separation of church and state ===
In 2014, Rhonheimer wrote that a foundational element of Christianity was the separation of church and politics, which could be understood as synonymous to separation of church and state.

=== Economy ===
In 2017, Rhonheimer criticized Pope Francis' view that "this economy kills". He supports neoliberal views of entrepreneurship, for which free market capitalism is "necessary". He says that "seeking profits is good per se and in a free and lawfully ordered market system it creates wellbeing for everyone". He criticizes Catholic social teachings because there were "no exact formulations in the New Testament" and they "had always been a product of their time". He stated the following:

In the meantime, we have gotten a welfare state-church system, because the church has become so integrated into the structures of the redistributive tax and welfare state that it is no longer free to question a system that, for example, blatantly contradicts the principle of subsidiarity and creates economically false incentives.

== Books ==
Rhonheimer has published a dozen books on topics concerning the philosophy of moral action, virtue, natural law, Aquinas, Aristotle, the ethics of sexuality and bioethics.

- Familie und Selbstverwirklichung. Alternativen zur Emanzipation. Verlag Wissenschaft und Politik, Köln 1979 (German)
- Natur als Grundlage der Moral. Die personale Struktur des Naturgesetzes bei Thomas von Aquin: Eine Auseinandersetzung mit autonomer und teleologischer Ethik. Tyrolia-Verlag, Innsbruck-Wien 1987 (German)
- La prospettiva della morale. Fondamenti dell'etica filosofica. Armando, Roma 1994
- La filosofia politica di Thomas Hobbes. Coerenza e contraddizioni di un paradigma. Armando, Roma 1997
- Etica della procreazione. Contraccezione - Fecondazione artificiale - Aborto. Edizioni PUL-Mursia, Milano 2000
- Natural Law and Practical Reason: A Thomist View of Moral Autonomy. Fordham University Press, 2000, ISBN 0-8232-1979-8 (Translation of Natur als Grundlage der Moral)
- Changing the World - The Timeliness of Opus Dei. 152 pages, Scepter Publishers (March 9, 2009) ISBN 1594170681.

(Die Verwandlung der Welt. Zur Aktualität des Opus Dei. Adamas Verlag, Köln 2006 (German)

- The Perspective of the Acting Person: Essays in the Renewal of Thomistic Moral Philosophy. Catholic University of America Press, 2008, ISBN 978-0-8132-1511-2
- Vital Conflicts in Medical Ethics: A Virtue Approach to Craniotomy and Tubal Pregnancies. Catholic University of America Press, 2009
- The Ethics of Procreation and the Defense of Human Life: Contraception, Artificial Fertilization, and Abortion. 336 pages. The Catholic University of America Press (February 15, 2010) ISBN 0813217229 (Abtreibung und Lebensschutz. Tötungsverbot und Recht auf Leben in der politischen und medizinischen Ethik. Verlag Ferdinand Schöningh, Paderborn, 2003. (German))
- The Perspective of Morality: Philosophical Foundations of Thomistic Virtue Ethics. Catholic University of America Press, 2011

== Articles in English available online ==
- The Truth About Condoms. The Tablet, UK, 10 July 2004 (free registration required)
- The Holocaust: What Was Not Said. First Things, no. 137, November 2003
- Mel Gibson's "The Passion of the Christ": A Plea for Fairness. Logos, 8:I, Winter 2005 (PDF)

== External sources ==
- Publications by and about Martin Rhonheimer in the catalogue Helveticat of the Swiss National Library
- Rhonheimer's personal web site
- List of publications
