= John Vidmar =

John C. Vidmar, O.P. is an associate professor of history at Providence College, Rhode Island where he also serves as provincial archivist and teaches history. Prior to his work at Providence, he served as associate professor, academic dean, acting president and prior teaching history for 15 years at the Dominican House of Studies in Washington D.C.

He also taught history at Ohio Dominican University.

He has lectured extensively at the Smithsonian Institution on the subjects of the Early Church, the Inquisition, the History of the Popes and a history of Religious Orders. Vidmar holds a Doctorate in Sacred Theology (S.T.D.) from the Pontifical University of St. Thomas Aquinas (Angelicum) in Rome, Italy, and a Master of Philosophy degree from the University of Edinburgh (Scotland) in Ecclesiastical History.

== Books ==
- The English Catholic Historians and the English Reformation 1585-1954 Sussex Academic Press, June 2005
- The Catholic Church Through the Ages Paulist Press, July 2005
- 101 Questions & Answers on The Da Vinci Code and the Catholic Tradition Paulist Press, March 2006; co-authored by Dr. Nancy de Flon
- Praying with the Dominicans: To Praise, to Bless, to Preach Paulist Press, March 2008

== Other published works ==
- "Catholics in Britain and Ireland, 1558-1829": An article from: The Catholic Historical Review, the only Catholic scholarly journal in the English speaking world devoted to the history of the universal Church; founded and published since 1915 at The Catholic University of America.
