= Ludwig Kaas =

German priest and politician

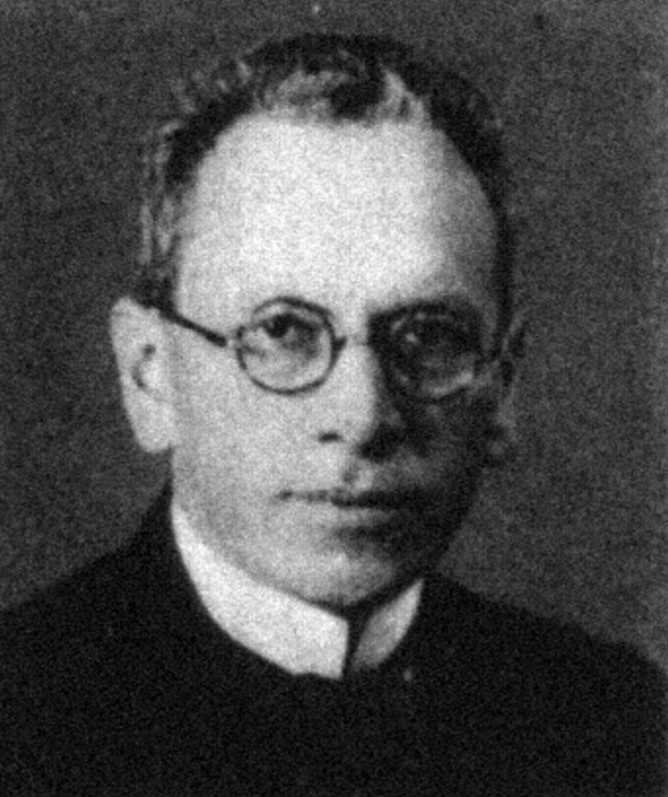
- Kaas c. 1928

Chairman of the Centre Party
- In office 8 December 1928 – 5 May 1933
- Preceded by: Wilhelm Marx
- Succeeded by: Heinrich Brüning

Member of the Reichstag
- In office 24 June 1920 – 22 June 1933
- Preceded by: Constituency established
- Succeeded by: Constituency abolished
- Constituency: Koblenz–Trier (1920–1932); Reichswahlvorschlag (1932–1933)

Member of the National Assembly for Koblenz–Trier
- In office 6 February 1919 – 21 May 1920
- Preceded by: Office established
- Succeeded by: Office abolished

Personal details
- Born: 23 May 1881 Trier, German Empire
- Died: 15 April 1952 (aged 70) Rome, Italy
- Resting place: St. Peter's Basilica
- Party: Centre Party
- Occupation: Priest, politician

Ordination history
History
Priestly ordination
- Date: 1906

Ludwig Kaas (23 May 1881 – 15 April 1952) was a German Catholic priest who led the Centre Party during Hitler's rise to power in the Weimar Republic, where he played a key role in supporting the Enabling Act that transformed Germany into a totalitarian dictatorship. Alongside Eugenio Pacelli, his longtime friend, he was instrumental in brokering the Reichskonkordat between the Holy See and the German Reich. Following Pacelli's election as Pope Pius XII, Kass assisted the pontiff in communications with the German resistance, and, following the conclusion of the Second World War, led the discovery of Saint Peter's tomb.

== Early career ==
Born in Trier, Kaas was ordained a priest in 1906 and studied history and canon law in Trier and Rome. In 1906 he completed a doctorate in theology and in 1909 he obtained a second doctorate in philosophy. In 1910 he was appointed rector of an orphanage and boarding school near Koblenz. Until 1933, he devoted his spare time to scholarly pursuits. In 1916 he published the book "Ecclesiastical jurisdiction in the Catholic Church in Prussia" (Die geistliche Gerichtsbarkeit der katholischen Kirche in Preußen in Vergangenheit und Gegenwart mit besonderer Berücksichtigung des Wesens der Monarchie), demonstrating his expertise in church history, Canon law and his political interests. In 1918 he requested to be sent to a parish, but Michael Felix Korum of Trier refused and instead appointed him professor of canon law at the Trier seminary in 1918. In that position, he published the study "Missing in war and remarriage in state law and canon law" (Kriegsverschollenheit und Wiederverheiratung nach staatlichen und kirchlichen Recht), dealing with remarriage in case of spouses missing in war. In 1919 he was offered the chair for canon law at the university of Bonn and was initially inclined to accept it, but as he did not find the conditions in Bonn to his liking and after consultation with Bishop Korum he refused the offer.

== Entry into politics ==
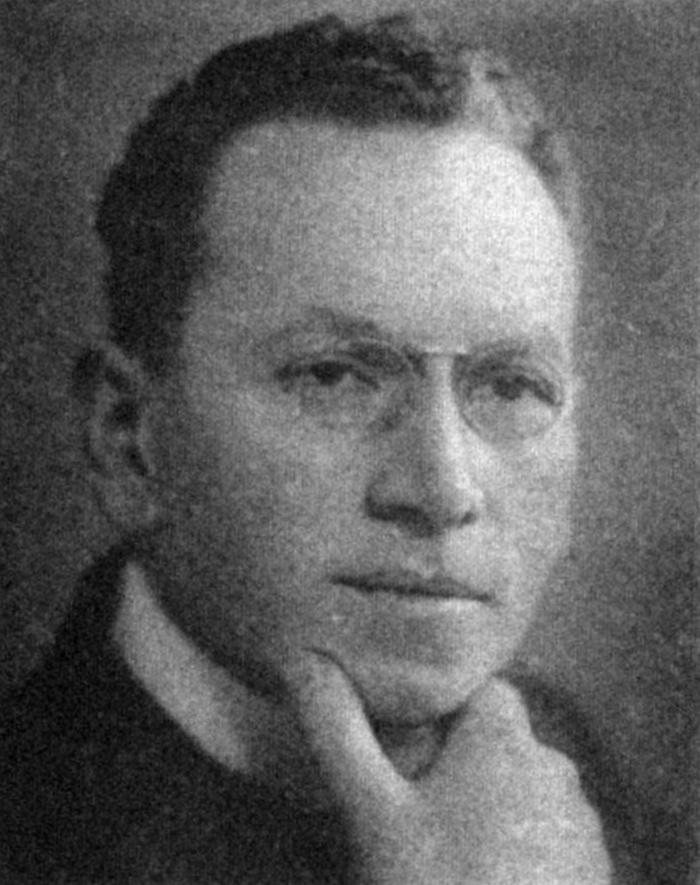
Kaas c. 1919

Distressed by the revolution, Kaas also decided to engage in politics and joined the Centre Party. In 1919 he was elected to the Weimar National Assembly and in 1920 to the Reichstag, of which he was a member until 1933. He was also elected to the Prussian State Council, the representation of Prussia's provinces. As a parliamentarian Kaas specialized in foreign policy. From 1926 to 1930 he was a German delegate to the League of Nations.

Kaas considered himself a "Rhenish Patriot" and advocated the creation of a Rhineland state within the framework of the German Reich. In 1923, a year of crisis, he – just like Konrad Adenauer, then mayor of Cologne – fought the separatists that wanted to break away the Rhineland from Germany. Despite French occupation, he sought reconciliation with France and voiced this desire in a famous Reichstag speech on 5 December 1923.

Despite personal reservations towards the Social Democrats (SPD), he developed a cordial relationship with President Friedrich Ebert and willingly acknowledged the SPD's accomplishments after 1918. Kaas supported foreign minister Stresemann's policy of reconciliation and denounced nationalist agitation against this policy – agitation he considered to be irresponsible.

== Advisor to the Nuncio Pacelli ==
In 1920, Eugenio Pacelli, the Papal Nuncio to Bavaria, was also appointed Nuncio to Germany. In view of this new position, he asked Cardinal Adolf Bertram of Breslau, to provide him with experts who might serve as a link between the Nuncio in Munich and the Prussian bishops. Bertram suggested Kaas, who in his academic work had developed a special interest in the relations between the state and the Catholic Church.

The workload as a professor, a parliamentarian and as advisor to the Nuncio strained Kaas's energies. Though Kaas tried to convince himself that his primary obligation was to his own diocese, it was his academic post that always came out last. In 1922 he was prepared to resign his chair, but Bertram and Pacelli insisted that he should stay until he had obtained a secure position within the diocese that would not hinder his external commitments. Bertram, following Pacelli's wishes, proposed to the new bishop of Trier, Franz Rudolf Bornewasser, to make Kaas a cathedral canon, but the bishop refused. An angry Kaas announced he would give up all his other commitments and concentrate on his academic work, but eventually he was reconciled to Bornewasser. On 1 April 1924, Kaas was appointed to the Cathedral chapter.

Bishop Bornewasser had allowed Kaas to keep his parliamentary seat until September 1924, but expected him to resign it afterwards and concentrate on his administrative and academic work within the diocese. However, Pacelli asked the bishop not to insist on this as it would "substantially hinder the hitherto influential work of Dr. Kaas and damage an effective representation of ecclesiastical interests in a deplorable way". Bornewasser, though legally in a stronger position, yielded to these considerations of expediency and did not press his demand again. In the same year, Kaas resigned from his academic chair.

Pascalina Lehnert, writing after Pacelli had already become Pope Pius XII, described the relationship between Kaas and Pacelli in the following words:

Talent, vision, and an excellent knowledge of the situation made Kaas a great advisor and incalculable helper. He was a fast learner, a hard and reliable worker with good judgement. The Nuncio, Cardinal and Holy Father (i.e., the Pope) appreciated him very much. Again and again I heard the highest praises from Pope Pius XII. The Monsignore knew, that the Holy Father had special esteem for him and he told me how much this knowledge fulfils him.

In 1925, as Pacelli was also appointed Apostolic Nuncio to Prussia and moved his office to Berlin, the cooperation between Pacelli and Kaas became even closer. Out of this involvement grew a formal but close and lasting friendship, which remained one of the basic factors throughout Kaas's life. In this position Kaas contributed to the successful conclusion of the Prussian Concordat negotiations with Prussia in 1929.

After this achievement, Pacelli was called back to the Vatican to be appointed Cardinal Secretary of State. Pacelli asked Kaas, who had accompanied him on his travel, to stay in Rome but Kaas declined because of his ecclesiastical and political duties in Germany. Nonetheless, Kaas would frequently travel to Rome, where he would stay with Pacelli, and experience first hand the conclusion of the Lateran Treaty, which he penned an article on. In 1931 and 1932 continued as an advisor in negotiations for a Reichskonkordat; that, however, came to nothing.

In 1929, Kaas published a volume of Nuncio Pacelli's speeches. In the introduction, he described him as: “Angelus not nuntius, ... his impressive personality, his sacerdotal words, the popularity he generated in public meetings"

== Kaas as party chairman ==
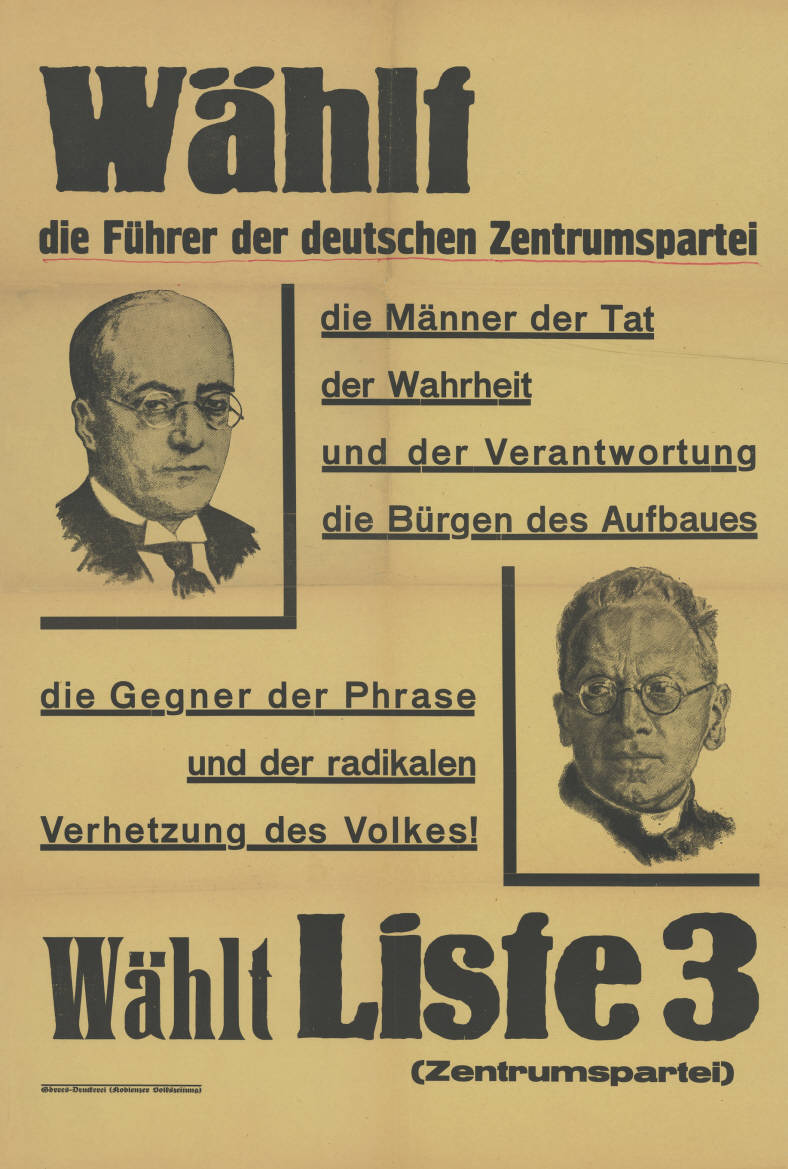
1930 Zentrum electoral poster featuring Kaas (bottom right)

Without being a candidate, in September 1928 Kaas was elected chairman of the Centre Party, in order to mediate the tension between the party's wings and to strengthen their ties with the Bishops. Under Kaas' watch, the centre began drifting steadily rightward. Much of his time was occupied in arranging a Reich-wide Concordat. This work made him increasingly distrustful of democracy, and he eventually concluded that only authoritarian rule could protect the interests of the church.

From 1930 onwards, Kaas loyally supported the administration under the centre's Heinrich Brüning, who served as the leader of the party's Reichstag faction due to Kaas' frequent travel to the Vatican. In 1932 he campaigned for the re-election of President Paul von Hindenburg, calling him a "venerated historical personality" and "the keeper of the constitution". As his frequent Vatican travels hampered his work as chairman, Kaas was prepared to yield the leadership of the party to Brüning, whom Hindenburg had dismissed in May, but the former Chancellor declined and asked the prelate to stay.

In 1932 Kaas and Brüning led the Centre Party into opposition to the new Chancellor: party renegade Franz von Papen. Kaas called him the "Ephialtes of the Centre Party". Kaas tried to re-establish a working parliament by cooperation with the National Socialists.

=== Hitler's Enabling Act ===
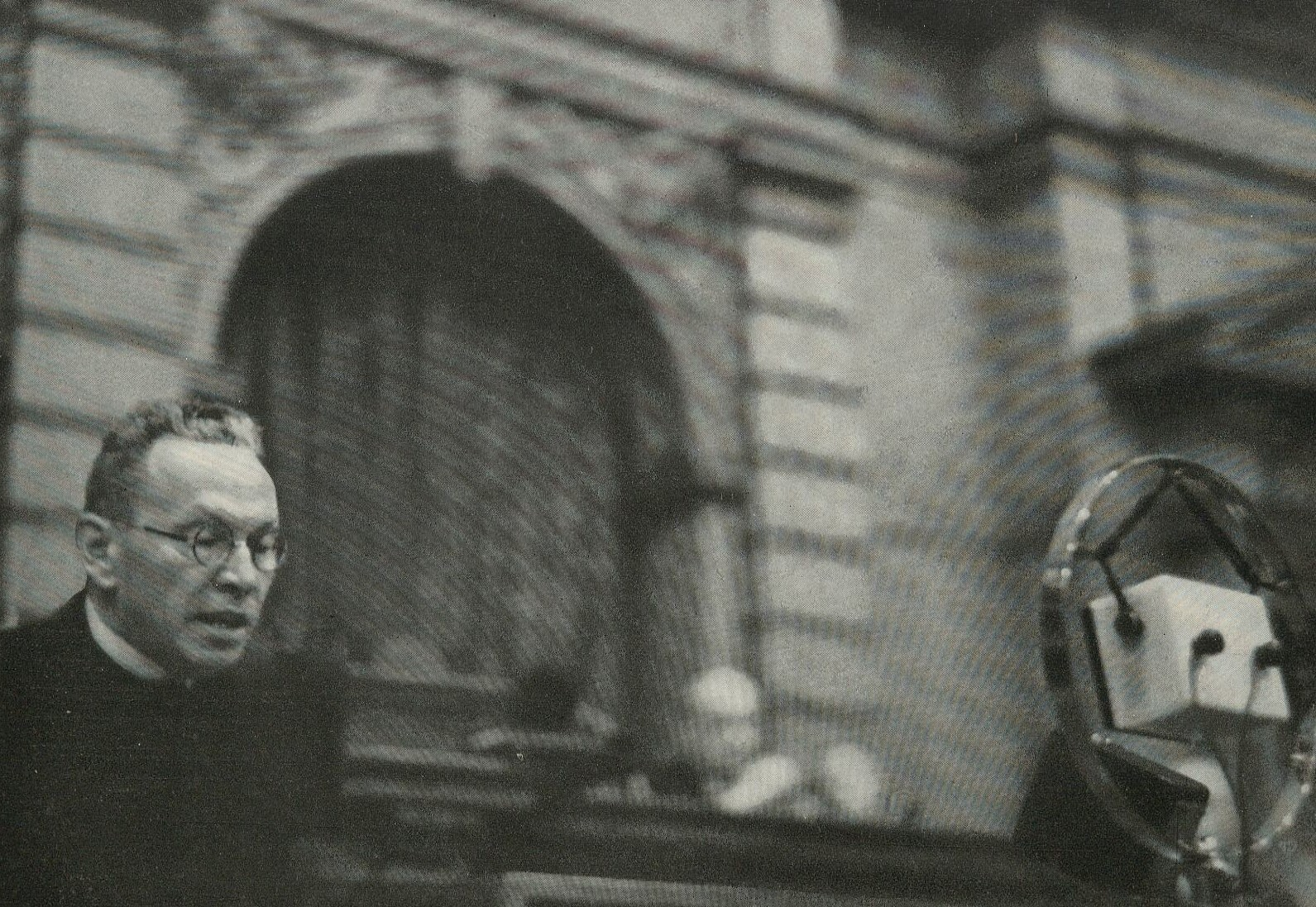
Kaas speaks before the Reichstag, 1930

Kaas felt betrayed when Adolf Hitler became Chancellor on 30 January 1933 based on a coalition between National Socialist German Workers Party (NSDAP), German National People's Party (DNVP) and independent conservatives, which excluded the Centre Party. In the campaign leading up to the election on 5 March, Kaas vigorously campaigned against the new government, but after the government parties succeeded in attaining a majority, he visited Vice Chancellor Papen, offering to put an end to their old animosities.

Later that month, from 15 March, he was the main Centre Party advocate supporting the Hitler administration's Enabling Act in return for certain constitutional and, allegedly ecclesiastic guarantees. Hitler responded positively via Papen. On 21 and 22 March the Centre leadership negotiated with Hitler on the conditions and reached an agreement. A letter, in which Hitler would confirm the agreement in writing, was promised by the government but never delivered.

Kaas—as much as the other party leaders—was aware of the doubtful nature of any guarantees; when the centre's parliamentary contingent assembled on 23 March to decide on their vote, he still advised his fellow party members to support the bill, given the "precarious state of the contingent", saying: "On the one hand we must preserve our soul, but on the other hand a rejection of the Enabling Act would result in unpleasant consequences for parliamentary membership and party. What is left is only to guard us against the worst. Were a two-thirds majority not obtained, the government's plans would be carried through by other means. The President has acquiesced in the Enabling Act. From the DNVP no attempt of relieving the situation is to be expected."

A considerable group of parliamentarians however opposed the chairman's course, among whom were the former Chancellors, his nemesis Heinrich Brüning and Joseph Wirth and former minister Adam Stegerwald. The opponents also argued in regard to Catholic social teaching that ruled out participating in an act of revolution. The proponents however argued that a "national revolution" had already occurred with Hitler's appointment and the presidential decree suspending basic rights, and that the Enabling Act would contain revolutionary force and move the government back to a legal order. Both groupings were not unaffected by Hitler's self-portrayal as a moderate seeking co-operation, as given on the Day of Potsdam of 21 March, as against the more revolutionary SA led by Ernst Röhm.

In the end, the majority of Centre parliamentarians supported Kaas's proposal. Brüning and his followers agreed to respect party discipline by also voting in favour of the bill.

On 23 March, the Reichstag assembled at midday under turbulent circumstances. Some SA men served as guards, while others crowded outside the building, both to intimidate any opposing views. Hitler's speech, which emphasised the importance of Christianity to the German culture, was aimed particularly at assuaging the Centre Party's sensibilities and almost verbatim incorporated Kaas's requested guarantees. Kaas gave a speech, voicing the centre's support for the bill amid "concerns put aside", while Brüning notably remained silent. When parliament assembled again in the evening, all parties except the SPD, represented by their chairman Otto Wels, voted in favour of the Enabling Act. This vote was a major step in the institution of the dictatorship of Adolf Hitler and is remembered as the prime example of a democracy voting for its own demise.

Because of Kaas's request for guarantees and because of his later involvement in the Reichskonkordat negotiations, it is sometimes alleged that Kaas's assent was part of a quid pro quo of interests between the Holy See and the new regime. There is however no evidence for involvement of the Holy See in these dealings.

Kaas had planned to travel to Rome since the beginning of the year, to discuss a conflict in Eupen and Malmedy, formerly German towns now belonging to Belgium, where priests had been arrested. This trip had been postponed by the political events – first Hitler's appointment, then the March elections, then by the Enabling Act – but on 24 March, one day after the decision, Kaas finally managed to leave for Rome. During this stay, Kaas explained to Pacelli the centre's rationale for acceding to the Enabling Act. On 30 March, he was called back to Germany to take part in sessions of the working committee, that had been promised during the Enabling Act negotiations. This committee was chaired by Hitler and Kaas and was supposed to inform about further legislative measures, but it only met three times: on 31 March, on 2 April (followed by a private talk between Kaas and Hitler) and on 7 April. On 5 April Kaas also reported to the foreign office about his talk in the Eupen-Malmedy affair.

== Reichskonkordat ==
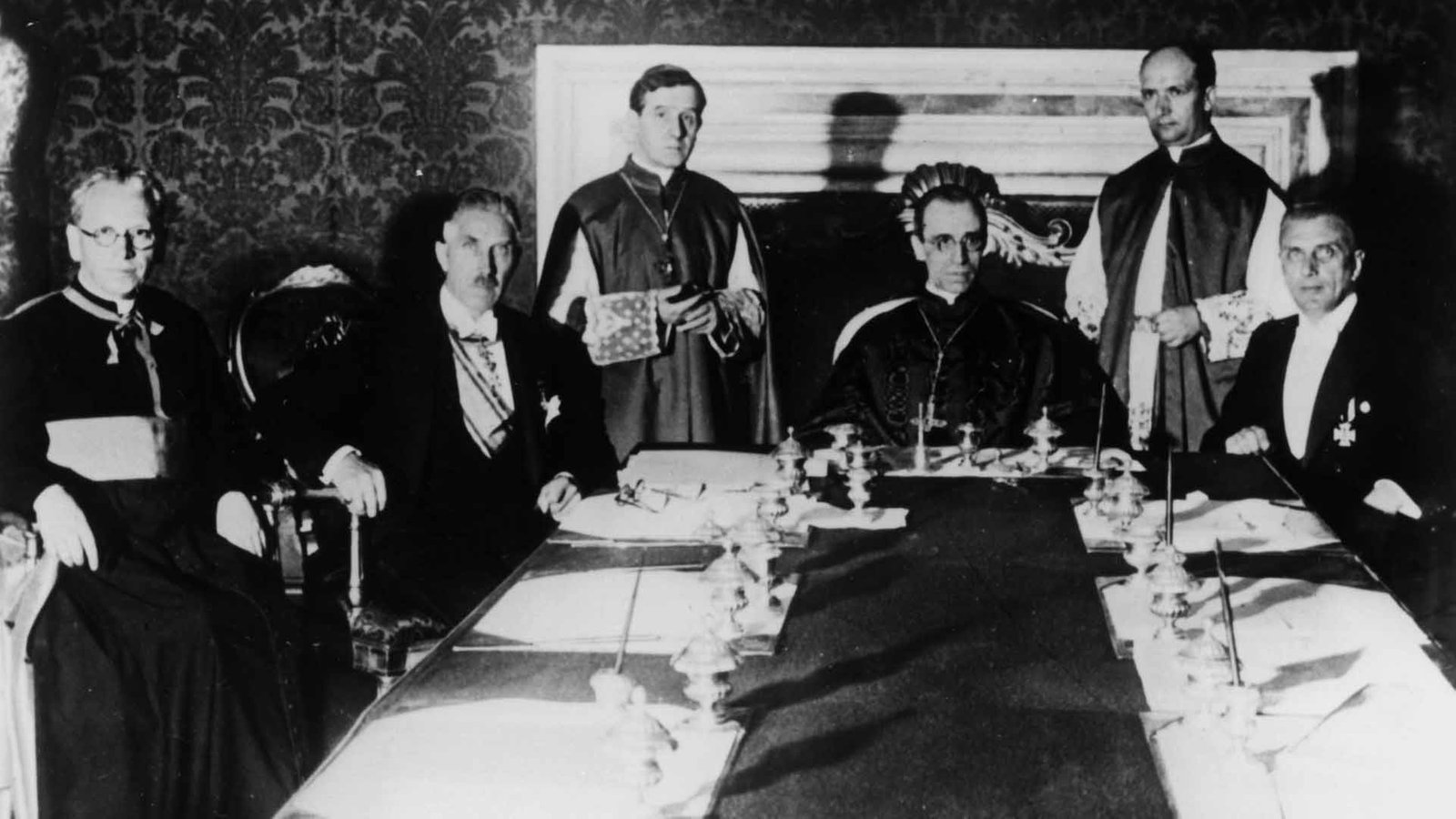
The signing of the Reichskonkordat on 20 July 1933 in Rome (from left to right: German prelate Ludwig Kaas, German Vice-Chancellor Franz von Papen, Secretary of Extraordinary Ecclesiastical Affairs Giuseppe Pizzardo, Cardinal Secretary of State Eugenio Pacelli, Alfredo Ottaviani, and member of Reichsministerium des Inneren [Home Office] Rudolf Buttmann)

On 7 April, directly after the third meeting of the working committee, Kaas once more left Berlin and headed for Rome. The next day, after having changed trains in Munich, the Prelate happened to meet Vice-Chancellor Papen in the dining car. Papen officially went on skiing holidays to Italy, but his real destination was Vatican City, where he was to offer a Reichskonkordat on his government's behalf. Kaas and Papen traveled on together and had some discussions about the matter on the train. After their arrival in Rome, Kaas was received first by Pacelli on 9 April. One day later, Papen had a morning meeting with Pacelli and presented Hitler's offer. Pacelli subsequently authorized Kaas, who was known for his expertise in Church-state relations, to negotiate the draft of the terms with Papen.

These discussions also prolonged his stay in Rome and raised questions in Germany as to a conflict of interest, since as a German parliamentarian he was advising the Vatican. On 5 May Kaas resigned from his post as party chairman, and pressure from the German government forced him to withdraw from visibly participating in the concordat negotiations. Though allegedly the Vatican tried to hold back the exclusion of Catholic clergy and organisations from politics, Pacelli was known to strongly favour the withdrawal of all priests from active politics, which is Church position in all countries even today. In the end, the Vatican accepted the restriction to the religious and charitable field. Even before the Roman negotiations had been concluded, the Centre Party yielded to increasing government pressure and dissolved itself, thus excluding German Catholics from participating in political life.

According to Oscar Halecki, Kaas and Pacelli, "on account of the exclusion of Catholics as a political party from the public life of Germany, found it all the more necessary that the Holy See assure government guarantees to maintain their position in the life of the nation" He maintains that Hitler had from the beginning no other aim than a war of extermination of the Church. Pacelli, now Pope Pius XII, met the German Cardinals on 6 March 1939, three days after his election. He referred to the constant Nazi attacks against the Church, and the Nazi responses to his protests, saying, "They always responded, 'sorry, but we cannot act because the concordat is not legally binding yet'. But after its ratification, things did not get any better, they got worse. The experiences of the past years are not encouraging." Despite this, the Holy See continued diplomatic relations with Germany in order to "connect to the bishops and faithful in Germany". As a result of the Concordat, the Church gained more teachers, more school buildings and more places for Catholic pupils. At the same time it was well known to Pacelli and Pope Pius XI that the Jews were being treated very differently. The Centre Party's vote for the Enabling Act, at Kaas's urging, was an action which fostered the establishment of the Hitlerian tyranny.

== At the Vatican ==
Kaas, who had played a pivotal role in the concordat negotiations, hoped to head an information office, watching over the implementation in Germany. However, Cardinal Bertram considered Kaas to be the wrong man, given his political past. Also, Kaas's conduct was controversial among his fellow party members, who saw his sudden and lasting move to Rome as an act of defection and his involvement in the concordat negotiations as treason to the party. A prime example of this view is Heinrich Brüning, who denounced Kaas in his own memoirs written in exile and not undisputed among historians.

Cardinal Bertram had proposed to elevate Kaas to honours without responsibilities. Accordingly, Kaas was appointed papal protonotary on 20 March 1934 and canon of the Basilica of Saint Peter on 6 April 1935. Meanwhile, the diocese of Trier stripped Kaas of his position in the cathedral chapter of Trier.

The exiled Kaas suffered from homesickness and from the rejection by his fellow party members and the German episcopate. On 20 August 1936, Kaas was appointed Economicus and Secretary of the Holy Congregation of the fabric of St. Peter's Basilica.

Pacelli was elected Pope Pius XII on 2 March 1939. Late in that year, after the outbreak of World War II, Kaas was one of the key figures for the secret Vatican Exchanges, in which Widerstand circles within the German army tried to negotiate with the Allies through the mediation of the Pope Pius XII. Josef Müller, a Bavarian lawyer, would travel to Rome from Berlin with instructions from Hans Oster or Hans von Dohnanyi and confer with Kaas or the Pope's secretary Pater Robert Leiber, in order to avoid direct contact between Müller and the Pope. These exchanges resumed in 1943 after the Casablanca conference, but neither attempt was successful.

After his election, Pius XII had decided to accelerate the archaeological excavations under St. Peter's Basilica and put Kaas in charge. At the Christmas message of the Holy Year 1950, Pius XII presented the preliminary results, which deemed it likely that the tomb of Saint Peter was resting below the Papal altar of the Basilica. Not all questions were solved, and Kaas continued excavations after 1950, despite an emerging illness.

Ludwig Kaas died in Rome in 1952, aged 70. He was first buried in the cemetery of Campo Santo in the Vatican. Later, Pope Pius XII ordered the body of his friend to be put to rest in the crypt of St. Peter's Basilica. Ludwig Kaas is thus the only monsignor who rests in the vicinity of virtually all popes of the twentieth century. To succeed him in his work, Pope Pius XII appointed a woman, Professor Margherita Guarducci, another Vatican novelty.

== List of publications ==
Ludwig Kaas was a scholar and prolific writer, addressing a wide range of issues in Latin or German concerning marital law, education reform, moral and systematic theology, canon law, prisoners of war, the speeches of Eugenio Pacelli, historical issues, policy issues of the Weimar Republic and the Reichskonkordat. Some of his writings were published after his death.

== Sources ==
- Halecki, Oscar. Pius XII, New York (1951).
- Kaas, Ludwig. Eugenio Pacelli, Erster Apostolischer Nuntius beim Deutschen Reich, Gesammelte Reden, Buchverlag Germania, Berlin (1930).
- Lehnert, Pascalina. Ich durfte ihm dienen. Erinnerungen an Papst Pius XII. Naumann, Würzburg (1986).
- Proces Verbal de la 1. conference, Lettres de Pie XII aux Eveques Allemands, Vatican City (1967).
- Proces Verbal de la 2. conference, Lettres de Pie XII aux Eveques Allemands, Vatican City (1967), p. 424–425.
- Scholder, Klaus. Die Kirchen und das Dritte Reich. Ullstein (1986).
- Tardini, Domenico Cardinale. Pio XII, Tipografia Poliglotta Vaticana (1960).
- Volk, Ludwig. Das Reichskonkordat vom 20.7.1933. Mainz (1972).
