= Territorial Prelature of Schneidemühl =

Former territorial prelature of the Catholic Church in Germany and Poland

Territorial Prelature of Schneidemühl Territorialis Praelatura Schneidemuhlensis Prälatur Schneidemühl (in German) Prałatura Pilska (in Polish)
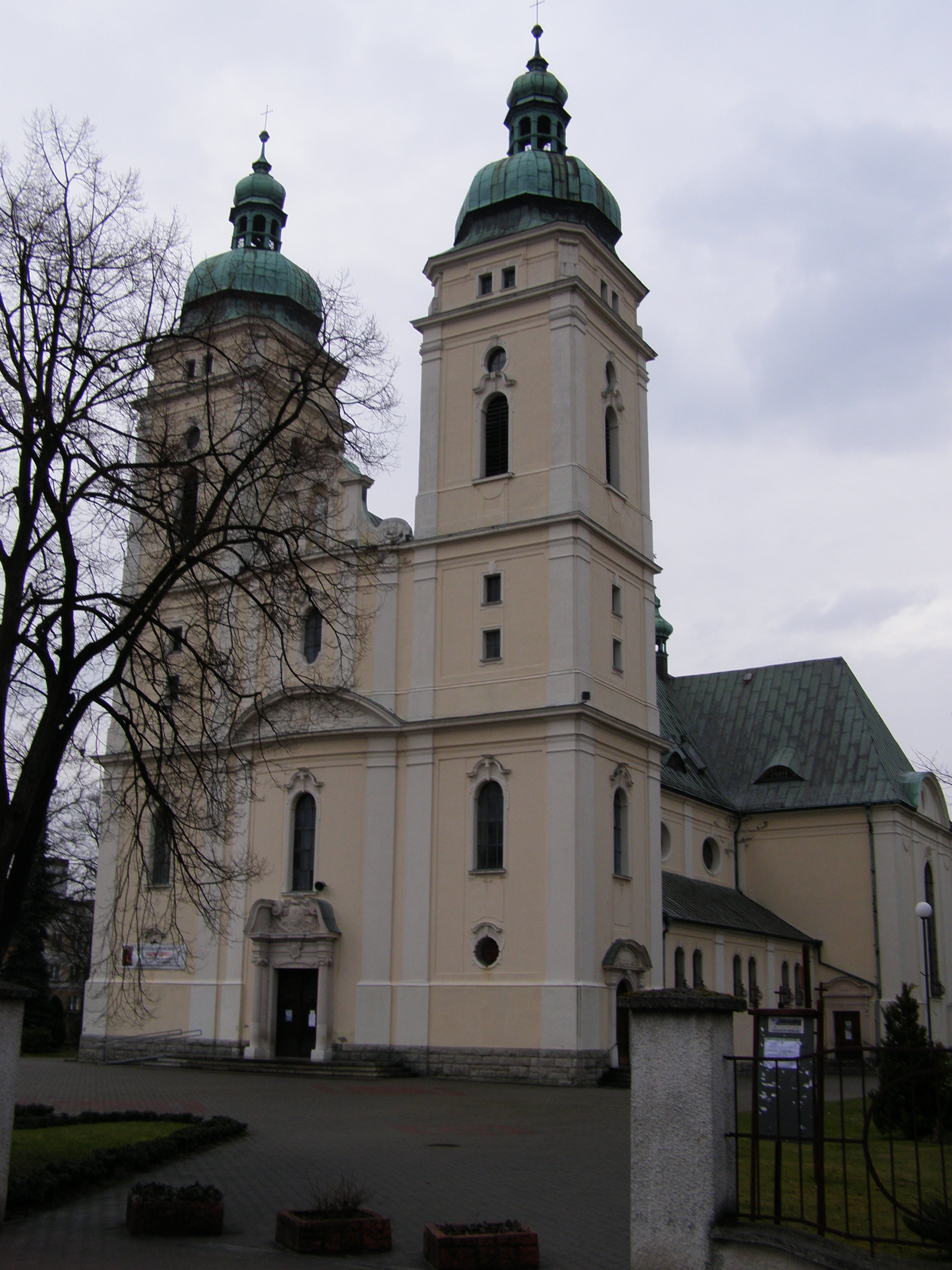
- Holy Family Church in Piła (former Co-Cathedral)

Location
- Country: Germany; Poland
- Territory: Posen-West-Prussia, Lauenburg and Bütow Land, Starostwo of Draheim
- Ecclesiastical province: Eastern Germany
- Metropolitan: Breslau (Wrocław)
- Deaneries: 8

Statistics
- Area: 9,601 km^{2} (3,707 sq mi)
- Population: Total; Catholics: (as of 1933); 427,522; 135,310 (31.59%)
- Parishes: 74 (as of 1930)

Information
- Rite: Latin Rite
- Established: 1 May 1923
- Dissolved: 1972
- Co-cathedral: Co-Cathedral of the Holy Family in Schneidemühl (Piła)
- Secular priests: 123 (as of 1930)

The Territorial Prelature of Schneidemühl or Territorial Prelature of Piła (German: Freie Prälatur Schneidemühl, Latin: Territorialis Praelatura Schneidemuhlensis, Polish: Niezależna Prałatura Pilska) was a Roman Catholic territorial prelature in first Germany (Nazi Germany as of 1933) and then Poland. It covered the territory of the Prussian Province of the Frontier March of Posen-West Prussia, but also the territories of the Lauenburg and Bütow (Lębork and Bytów) Land and the former Starostwo of Draheim (Drahim), which were parts of the Province of Pomerania at the time. It was named after its seat in Schneidemühl (Piła) and belonged to the Eastern German Ecclesiastical Province under the Breslau/Wrocław Metropolia since 1930.

== History ==
Following the restoration of independent Poland following World War I, it regained the bulk of the territories of the Archdiocese of Gniezno-Poznań (until 1946 in personal union) and the Diocese of Chełmno annexed by Prussia in the Partitions of Poland, however, small portions remained within Germany after 1919 and 1920. On 1 December 1920 Archbishop Edmund Dalbor of Gniezno-Poznań appointed an archiepiscopal delegate with the powers of a vicar general for the five concerned deaneries with 45 parishes and 80,000-100,000 Catholic faithful. Bishop Augustinus Rosentreter of Chełmno objected to separate his three eastern deaneries located in the historical Lauenburg and Bütow Land and Starostwo of Draheim, with about 40,000 Catholic parishioners.

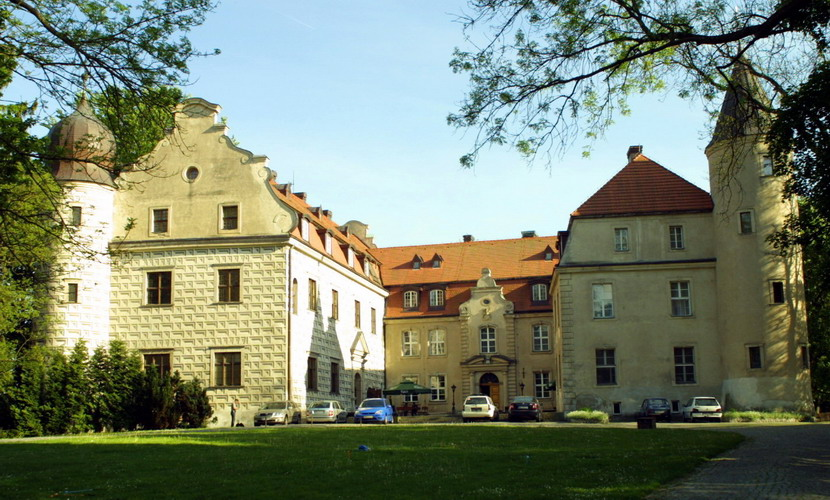
Tuczno Castle, seat of the Administrator of Tütz between 1920 and 1927.

Nevertheless, the Holy See disentangled these deaneries of Chełmno in 1922 and subordinated them to the archiepiscopal delegate seated in Tütz (Tuczno). On 1 May 1923 the Holy See united the concerned deaneries to form the new Apostolic Administration of Tütz. The Holy See entrusted protonotary Robert Weimann (1870–1925) with the Administration Apostolic of Tütz.

On 6 July 1926 Maximilian Kaller succeeded Weimann. On Kaller's instigation the seat of the Administration was moved from Tütz to Schneidemühl (Piła) in 1927, where Kaller then took on the local parish. Schneidemühl had become the capital of Frontier March of Posen-West Prussia Province, when the Free State of Prussia had reorganised its dissected remnants of the former Provinces of Posen and of West Prussia as a province of their own on 1 July 1922.

Following the 1929 Prussian Concordat, concluded between the Nuncio to Prussia, Eugenio Pacelli, and the Free State, the administration was elevated to Territorial Prelature within the new Eastern German Ecclesiastical Province under the Roman Catholic Archdiocese of Wrocław on 13 August 1930. The prelates were not to be consecrated as bishops. Kaller was elevated to be the first prelate.

In 1930 Kaller founded Katholischer Siedlungsdienst (Catholic Colonisation Service) in Berlin and entrusted Ludwig Sebald Polzin (1892–1964) with its management. During his term the colonisation service bought and parcelled manor estates and founded new settlements in Adlig Rose, Bärenwalde (Bińcze), Barkenfelde (Barkowo), Eckartsberge (Kolno), Falkenwalde (Sokole), Marienthal, Paradies (Paradyż), Philipshof, Sampohl (Sąpolno), Schlichtingsheim (Szlichtyngowa), and Schmirtenau (Śmiardowo). Later in 1930 Kaller was consecrated in Schneidemühl's Holy Family Concathedral bishop of his new Diocese of Warmia, then moving to its diocesan seat in Frauenburg (Frombork).

In 1930 the new prelature comprised 74 parishes with 123 priests dispersed in four separate exclaves, on the German side of the border to the Polish Voivodeships of Poznań and of Pomerania. Visiting the parishes in the different exclaves was a tiresome effort. In 1933 the prelature comprised 9,601 km^{2} with 135,310 Catholic parishioners among 427,522 inhabitants. It was divided into eight deaneries seated in Betsche (Pszczew), Bomst (Babimost), Deutsch Krone (Wałcz), Flatow (Złotów), Fraustadt (Wschowa), Lauenburg in Pomerania (Lębork), Schlochau (Człuchów) and Schneidemühl.

Neighbouring dioceses were Chełmno in the northeast, Poznań in the east and south, Breslau in the south and Berlin in the west and north. While the Apostolic Administration did not dispose of an efficace administration, the Prelature had a consistory consisting of five persons, with a vicar general (Msgr. Johannes Bleske) and an official (Erich Klitsche) since 1930. On 25 February 1931 Franz Hartz succeeded Kaller as prelate.

During the Great Depression Polzin organised "Katholischer Freiwilliger Arbeitsdienst" (Catholic Volunteer Service), an employment-creation measure financed by the prelature. Soon after the Nazi takeover the volunteer service was confiscated by the Reichsarbeitsdienst, the colonisation service was gradually usurped by the Nazi party and Polzin temporarily taken into Gestapo arrest in 1935, while the Nazis fought the Catholic youth organisations.

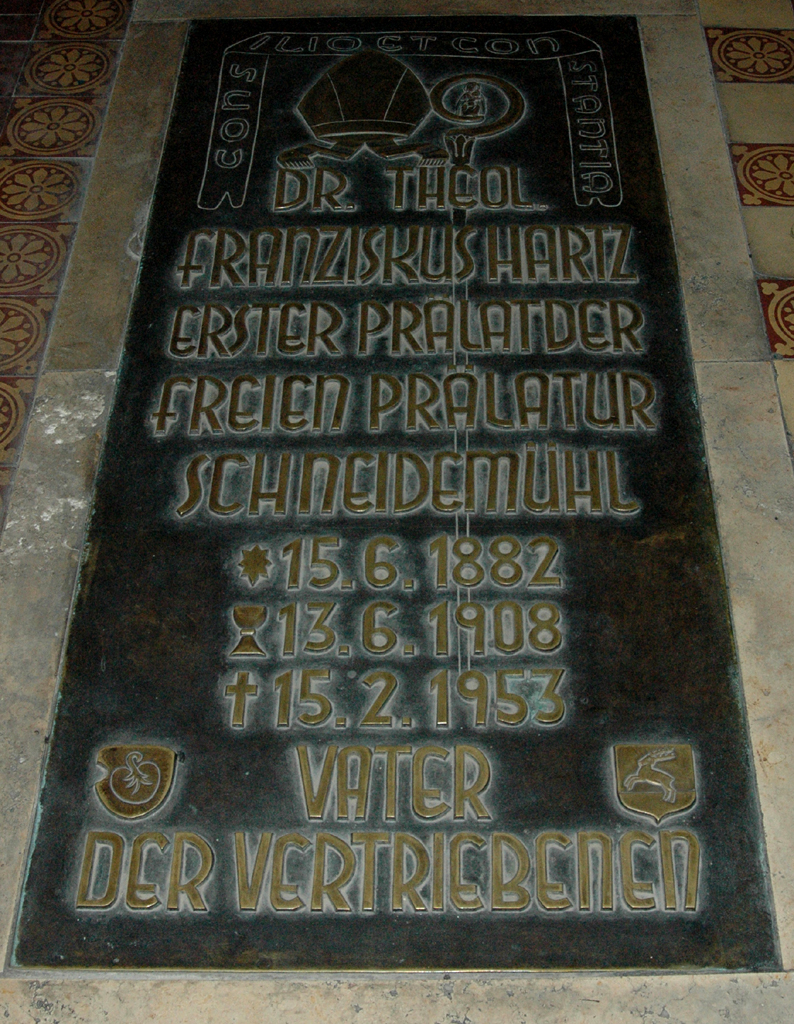
Grave slab of Prelate Franz Hartz in St. Cyriacus Church in Hüls, Krefeld.

In early 1945 Prelate Hartz fled – like many other parishioners too – the invading Soviet Red Army and stranded in Fulda by the end of World War II. In March 1945 the area became eventually again part of Poland, although with a Soviet-installed communist regime, which remained in power for several decades. The new authorities expelled most of the remaining and surviving German population to Allied-occupied Germany in the years between 1945 and 1948 in accordance with the Potsdam Agreement. Polzin, who served as priest in Rokitten (Rokitno) since 1936, was expelled on 22 June 1945. Stranded in Berlin he organised the "Katholischer Flüchtlingsdienst" (Catholic Refugee Service), taking care of the destitute refugees and expellees.

Cardinal August Hlond, arrogating his special papal plenipotentiary power to reorganise the Polish episcopate, also appointed apostolic administrators for the former German dioceses now under Polish rule. Although Hartz had not resigned, Hlond appointed on 15 August 1945 Edmund Nowicki (1900–1971) with effect of 1 September as administrator for the Prelature and the Diocese of Berlin east of the Oder. Nowicki was titled Administrator of Kamień, Lubusz and the Prelature Piła (Polish: Administrator Kamieński, Lubuski i Prałatury Pilskiej), seated in Gorzów Wielkopolski. The anti-clerical communist government under Bolesław Bierut deposed and banished Nowicki from the administration in 1951. Thus Vicar Tadeusz Załuczkowski replaced him, followed by Vicar Zygmunt Szelążek in 1952.

Prelate Hartz died in 1953 in Hüls, a locality of Krefeld. In the same year the Schneidemühl Consistory, whose members then lived in the Federal Republic of Germany, then – following canon law – elected Polzin capitular vicar for the vacant see, confirmed by the Holy See on 20 October 1953. In 1956 Teodor Bensch (1903–1958) was appointed administrator of Kamień, Lubusz and the Prelature Piła, succeeded by Józef Michalski (only 1958), and again by Administrator Wilhelm Pluta (1910–1986), Bishop of the titulature of Leptis Magna, serving as administrator until 1972.

After Polzin's death the Schneidemühl Consistory had elected Wilhelm Volkmann capitular vicar in 1964, holding that position until 1972. With the reorganisation of the church administration in western Poland in 1972 the Prelature of Piła was dissolved and its diocesan area divided between the Dioceses of Gorzów (since 1992 Zielona Góra-Gorzów) and of Koszalin-Kolobrzeg.

The Holy See established the office of a Visitator Apostolic for the diocesans of the Prelature of Schneidemühl exiled in today's Germany. Paul Snowadzki was appointed first visitator in 1972 (till 1982), succeeded by Wolfgang Klemp in the years 1982 to 1997. Currently, Lothar Schlegel is entrusted the visitation of the diocesans of Danzig (Gdańsk), Warmia and Schneidemühl living in Germany. In Fulda former Schneidemühl diocesans run the Heimatwerk der Katholiken aus der Freien Prälatur Schneidemühl e.V. (Homeland endowment of the Catholics from the Territorial Prelature of Schneidemühl), an association occupied with the history, culture and legacy of the prelature and its diocesans.

== Leadership ==
=== Administrators of Tütz ===
- 1923–1925: Protonotary Robert Weimann (1870–1925), already archiepiscopal delegate since 1920
- 1926–1930: Administrator Maximilian Kaller (1870–1947)

=== Prelates of Schneidemühl ===
- 1930: Prelate Maximilian Kaller, advanced to Bishop of Ermland
- 1931–1953: Prelate Franz Hartz (1870–1953)

=== Capitular Vicars of Schneidemühl ===
- 1953–1964: Ludwig Sebald Polzin (1892–1964)
- 1964–1972: Wilhelm Volkmann

=== Apostolic Administrators and Vicars of Kamień, Lubusz and the Prelature of Piła ===
- 1945–1951: Administrator Edmund Nowicki (1900–1971), deposed and banished by Bolesław Bierut government
- 1951–1952: Vicar Tadeusz Załuczkowski
- 1952–1956: Vicar Zygmunt Szelążek
- 1956–1958: Administrator Teodor Bensch (1903–1958)
- 1958: Jozef Michalski
- 1958–1972: Administrator Wilhelm Pluta (1910–1986), advanced to Bishop of Gorzów

=== Apostolic Visitators for the exiled Schneidemühl diocesans ===
- 1972–1982: Paul Snowadzki
- 1982–1997: Wolfgang Klemp
- 1997–present: Msgr. Lothar Schlegel

== Literature ==
- Die Apostolische Administratur Schneidemühl. Ein Buch für das katholische Volk, Franz Westpfahl (ed.), Schneidemühl: Verlag des Johannesboten, 1928.
- Kirchliches Handbuch für das katholische Deutschland, Amtliche Zentralstelle für Kirchliche Statistik des Katholischen Deutschlands (ed.), Cologne: Bachem, 1909–1943, here: vol. 20 '1937/1938' (publ. 1937), vol. 21: '1939/1940' (publ. 1939) and vol. 22 '1943' (publ. 1943).
