= Adrian Put =

Polish Roman Catholic auxiliary bishop in Zielona Góra-Gorzów

The Most Reverend Adrian Put
- Titular Bishop of Furnos Minor, Auxiliary Bishop of Diocese of Zielona Góra-Gorzów
- Church: Roman Catholic Church
- Appointed: 28 June 2022

Orders
- Ordination: 22 May 2004 by Adam Dyczkowski
- Consecration: 13 August 2022 by Salvatore Pennacchio

Personal details
- Born: Adrian Put; 4 November 1978 (age 47) Szczecin, Poland
- Education: Major Theological Seminary in Gościkowo, University of Szczecin
- Coat of arms

Bishop Adrian Put (born 4 November 1978) is a Polish Roman Catholic prelate, who currently serves as the Titular Bishop of Furnos Minor and Auxiliary bishop of the Roman Catholic Diocese of Zielona Góra-Gorzów since 28 June 2022.

== Early life and education ==
Put was born in Szczecin in the Roman Catholic family, but since 1990 grew up in Gorzów Wielkopolski. As a youngster he participated in the Light-Life Movement. After graduation of the primary school education and the classical liceum in Gmina Deszczno in 1998, he joined Major Theological Seminary in Gościkowo-Paradyż, Poland (1998–2004) and was ordained a priest for the Diocese of Zielona Góra-Gorzów on 22 May 2004 at the St. Mary's Cathedral in Gorzów Wielkopolski by bishop Adam Dyczkowski, after he completed his philosophical and theological studies.

== Pastoral and administrative work ==
In the years 2004–2009 he was an assistant priest in the parish of Visitation in Lubsko and during 2009–2011 assistant priest in the parish of the First Polish Martyrs in Gorzów Wielkopolski. In this time he continued his postgraduate studies at the University of Szczecin, Poland and in 2009 he obtained a Licentiate degree and in 2015 a Doctor of Theology degree in the field of the Ecclesiastical History.

During 2015–2021 Fr. Put was the parish priest of the parish of St. Stanisław Kostka in Zielona Góra, and in 2021 he was appointed pastor of the Co-Cathedral of St. Hedwig of Silesia in Zielona Góra. In 2011 he became the auxiliary youth chaplain for the Light-Life Movement, in 2013 he became a member of the diocesan council for Catholic movements and associations, in 2016 he became the moderator of the diocesan Light-Life Movement, in 2017 he joined the diocesan pastoral council, and in 2019 he took over the leadership over the diocesan catechumenal center. Moreover, in 2022 he became a member of the diocesan liturgical commission. In 2021, he was appointed honorary canon of the Zielona Góra Collegiate Chapter of St. Jadwiga.

== Prelate ==
On 28 June 2022 Fr. Put was appointed by Pope Francis as an auxiliary bishop of the Roman Catholic Diocese of Zielona Góra-Gorzów and Titular Bishop of Furnos Minor. On 13 August 2022 he was consecrated by archbishop Salvatore Pennacchio and other prelates of the Roman Catholic Church in the Co-Cathedral of St. Hedwig of Silesia in Zielona Góra.

Catholic Church titles
| Preceded by Ernesto Maguengue | Titular Bishop of Furnos Minor; 2022– | Incumbent |
