= Maximilian Kaller =

Prussian Roman Catholic bishop

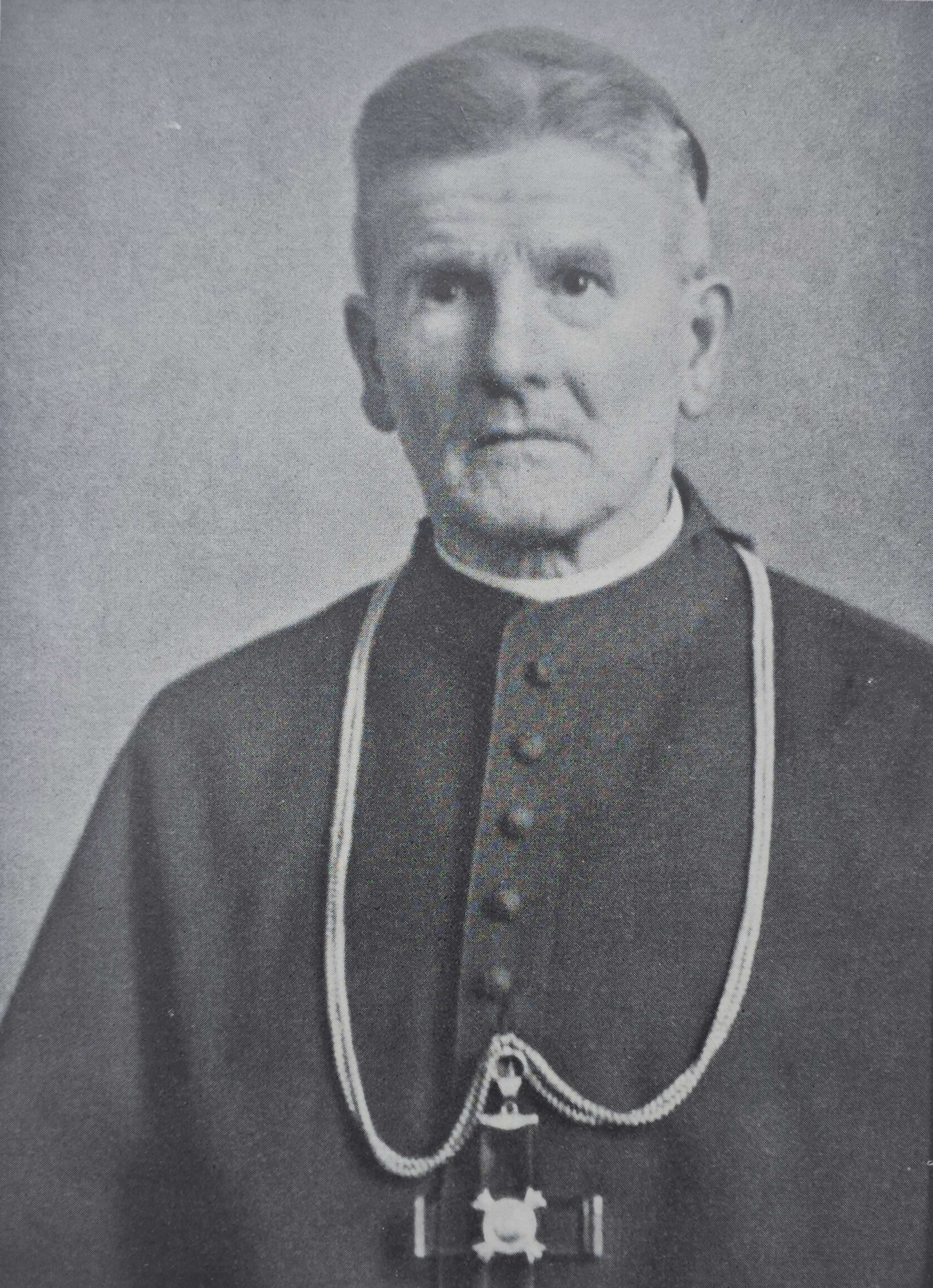
Maximilian Kaller

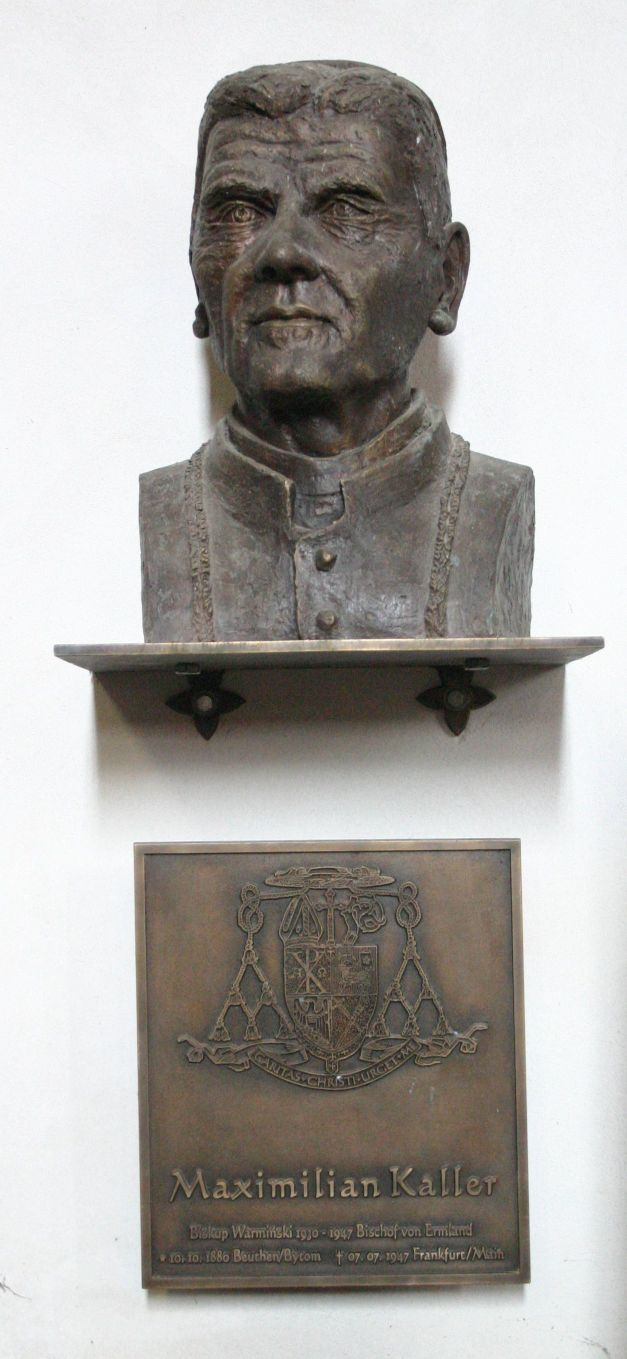
Bust of Kaller in Frombork's Archcathedral Basilica of the Assumption of the Blessed Virgin Mary and St. Andrew, Frombork.

Maximilian Kaller (10 October 1880 – 7 July 1947) was Roman Catholic Bishop of Ermland (Polish: Warmia) in East Prussia from 1930 to 1947. However, de facto expelled from mid-August 1945, he was a special bishop for the homeland-expellees until his death.

== Early life ==
Kaller was born in Beuthen (Bytom), Prussian Silesia, into a merchant family, the second of eight children. With the population of Beuthen being of German and Polish ethnicity he grew up bilingual in German and Polish. He graduated from the Gymnasium in 1899 with Abitur and started theological studies in Breslau (today's Wrocław) at the episcopal see of his then home Prince-Bishopric of Breslau. There he was consecrated a priest in 1903.

He was the chaplain in the parish of Groß Strehlitz (today's Strzelce Opolskie) in the Breslau diocese. Between 1905 and 1917, he practised as a missionary priest at St. Boniface parish in Bergen on Rügen Island in the Hither Pomeranian Catholic diaspora within Breslau's Prince-Episcopal Delegation for Brandenburg and Pomerania. He raised the necessary donations to erect St. Boniface Church there in 1912. From 1917, he was the priest at Berlin's second oldest Catholic Church, Saint Michael's Garrison Church.

== Career as prelate and bishop ==
In 1926, he succeeded Robert Weimann (1870–1925) as Apostolic Administrator of Schneidemühl (today's Piła). Kaller's jurisdiction comprised Catholic parishes of the dioceses of Chełmno and of Gniezno-Poznań, which had been separated from their episcopal sees by the new Polish border in 1918 and 1920, respectively. On Kaller's instigation, the seat of the apostolic administration had been moved from Tütz (Tuczno) to Schneidemühl on 1 July 1926.

Following the Prussian Concordat (German: Preußenkonkordat) of 1929, some Catholic dioceses and jurisdictions in Northern, Middle and Eastern Germany had been reorganised. In 1930, the Apostolic Administration of Tütz was reconstituted as the Territorial Prelature of Schneidemühl (German: Freie Prälatur Schneidemühl, Polish: Prałatura Pilska, existing until 1972, and from 1945 under apostolic administrators) with Kaller being promoted to prelate.

On 2 September 1930, Kaller was invested as bishop of the Roman Catholic Diocese of Ermland (an archdiocese since 1992) by Pope Pius XI and consecrated in Schneidemühl, afterwards taking the episcopal see in Frauenburg (today's Frombork). Franz Hartz succeeded Kaller as Prelate of Schneidemühl.

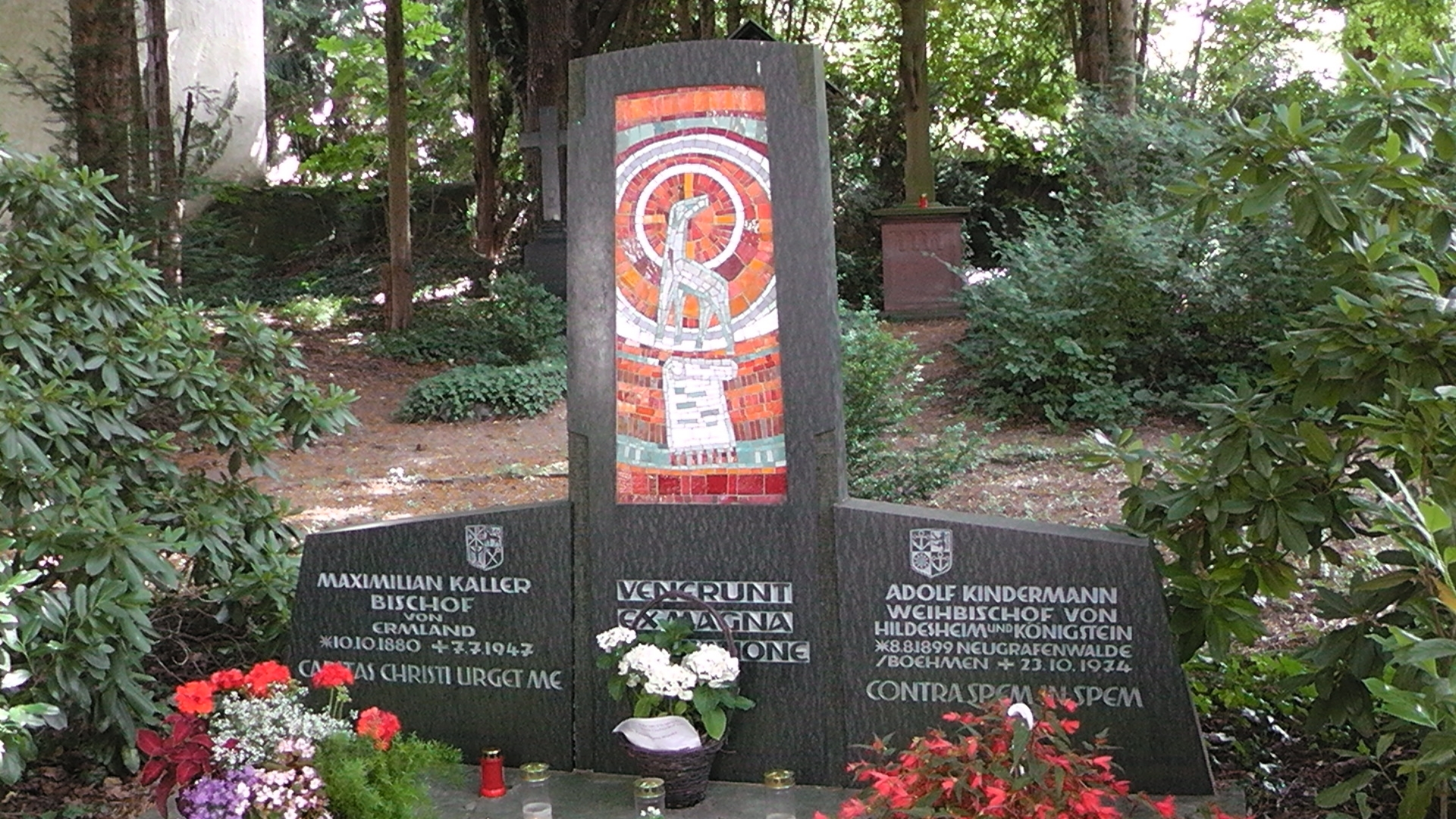
Grave of Maximilian Kaller – with bishop Adolf Kindermann in Königstein im Taunus

From 1925, Ermland diocese comprised all of the Prussian Province of East Prussia in its borders of 1938. In the year of Kaller's investiture, his diocese, which had turned exempt in 1566 when its original metropolitan Archbishopric of Riga, had become Lutheran and was de jure dissolved, became again suffragan to an archdiocese. Ermland diocese, together with the new Berlin diocese and Schneidemühl prelature joined the new Eastern German Ecclesiastical Province (German: Ostdeutsche Kirchenprovinz) under the newly elevated Metropolitan Archbishop Adolf Bertram of Breslau.

In 1932, Kaller consecrated the new diocesan seminary for priests in Braunsberg in East Prussia (today's Braniewo). Under his jurisdiction, Ermland diocese issued a new diocesan hymnal and a diocesan ritual (cf. Rituale Romanum) in Latin and the three native languages of the diocesan parishioners (German, Lithuanian and Polish). Kaller was also appointed apostolic visitator to the then 8,000 Catholic faithful in Klaipėda Region (Memelland), a Lithuanian-annexed formerly East Prussian area, whose then four Catholic parishes had been seceded from Ermland diocese and subsequently formed part of the Territorial Prelature of Klaipėda existing between 1926 and 1991.

Kaller and other members of the German Catholic and Protestant Churches formulated their opposition to the policy of Nazi mysticism early on (cf. Struggle of the churches). German clergy who opposed Adolf Hitler or supported refugees were strongly persecuted under the Nazi dictatorship. On 10 June 1939, Pope Pius XII appointed Kaller apostolic administrator of the Territorial Prelature of Memel, after Lithuania had ceded Memelland under German pressure to Nazi Germany in March the same year. In 1942, Kaller applied to Nuncio Cesare Orsenigo to resign from episcopate in order to administer services at Theresienstadt, but his wish was not granted.

On 7 February 1945, during World War II, the Nazi Schutzstaffel forced Kaller out of his episcopal office while the Soviet Red Army was overrunning Ermland diocese. Kaller had appointed Frauenburg's Cathedral dean Aloys Marquardt (1891–1972) as vicar general to the see.

== After World War II ==
After World War II, most Germans were expelled to Allied-occupied Germany, including Marquardt who had to leave in July. Frauenburg's cathedral chapter then elected the aged Canon Johannes (Jan) Hanowski, a German of Polish ethnicity and long-term archpriest of Allenstein (today's Olsztyn), as capitular vicar, i.e. provisional head of the see, on 28 July 1945.

Kaller, who had been stranded by the end of the war in Halle upon Saale, made his 720-kilometre (450 mi)-long way back to his see and arrived on one of the first nights of August 1945 in Allenstein/Olsztyn, taking on the jurisdiction from Hanowski. He started to develop new plans for his diocese especially aiming at overcoming the nationalist antagonism between Catholics of the German and Polish languages, reshaping the diocese in the spirit of German-Polish reconciliation. He appointed Franciszek Borowiec, his close collaborator, as new vicar general for the Diocesan area under Polish occupation and Paul Hoppe (1900–1988), Königsberg in Prussia (today's Kaliningrad), as vicar general for the diocesan area under Soviet occupation.

Kaller further appointed an ethnic Pole as new cathedral provost, since his predecessor provost, Franz Xaver Sander (also official), and five more fellow cathedral canons had been killed by the invading Soviets. (The other killed canons were Andreas Hinzmann, Dr. Franz Heyduschka, Dr. Wladislaus Switalski, Anton Krause and Dr. Bruno Gross.) Addressing the Polish authorities in the annexed area of his diocese, Kaller declared that he wanted to continue his episcopate within Poland, but officials said it was for neither him nor them, but Warsaw to decide that. Kaller chose four ethnic Poles as canon candidates to replenish the chapter so that ethnic Poles and Germans would each have half the seats. With these activities and plans Kaller was unique among the German bishops in the eastern territories.

On 14 August, he received a telegramme from August Hlond for the expelled Marquardt. Polish Primate Hlond had invited the vicar general for a meeting on the diocesan future to Pelplin, not knowing that the Polish authorities had expelled him, let alone that the deported Kaller had managed to return. A Polish government car was provided and Kaller and Borowiec travelled the next day to Pelplin. When, on coming for the general vicar, the Polish government representatives learned the bishop himself was coming, they sent an advance party to Pelplin in order to inform Hlond.

As Pelplin's canon and chancellor, Franciszek Kurland recalled, Kaller was not welcomed in priestly fraternity. It was difficult enough to urge a general vicar to resign, but the papally-invested bishop was another task. In fluent Polish, Kaller and Hlond, his chaplain Bolesław Filipiak, his brother Antoni Hlond SDB, Leon Kozłowski (Chełmno's vicar general) and Kurland conversed while taking lunch, discussing the situation. Kaller explained that he wanted to stay with his diocese in Poland and talked about his plans. Hlond replied that Kaller was no Polish citizen and thus unacceptable as bishop in the Polish area, avoiding the term "state", since Ermland diocese was only Polish-occupied German territory. Afterwards, in a private conversation, Hlond urged Kaller to resign which he did for the jurisdiction in the Polish-occupied diocesan area, but retained the office of Bishop of Ermland, which rather turned quite void, especially since in the Soviet-occupied diocesan area no Catholic ecclesiastical activity whatsoever was tolerated. Later in Poznań, Hlond praised Kaller for how he had complied with the demanded resignation from jurisdiction.

On his way back, accompanied by Borowiec, Kaller cried and told him that the jurisdiction in the Polish-occupied diocesan area would be passed on to Teodor Bensch, a German-born naturalised Pole, who would arrive within days officiating as apostolic administrator. They returned home in the evening on 16 August. Kaller could not appoint the four new canons for the chapter any more but was expelled the next day, transferred by lorry to Warsaw, accompanied by Borowiec, who also joined him on the train to Poznań on 18 August. Then Borowiec, who had not been expelled, returned to the diocese, while Kaller had to leave via Stettin for Allied-occupied Germany.

== Kaller's last years ==
Kaller found asylum in what became Bizone in 1947. On 26 September 1946, Pius XII appointed him Papal Special Commissioner for the homeland-expelled Germans (German: Päpstlicher Sonderbeauftragter für die heimatvertriebenen Deutschen). In November 1946, Pius XII invited Kaller to Rome. Both were personally acquainted since their common time in Berlin (Pius as Nuncio to Germany and Kaller as priest), and the latter reported to the pope on the destitute situation of the expellees from eastern Europe. On 7 July 1947, Kaller died suddenly of a heart attack in Frankfurt am Main and was buried besides St. Mary's Church in Königstein im Taunus.

== Succession of Kaller until 1972 ==
On 11 July 1947, the Ermland chapter, residing in the Allied Bizone, then elected Provost Arthur Kather (1883–1957), officiating before his exile at St. Nicholas Catholic Church in Elbing (today's Elbląg), capitular vicar, as provided by canon law in case of sede vacante. The Holy See later confirmed him and thereafter Kather represented Ermland diocese in the Fulda Conference of Bishops until his death.

On 29 July 1957, the Ermland chapter, with the surviving capitulars living in what had become West Germany, elected Hoppe as capitular vicar, who had been expelled from the Soviet-occupied Ermland diocesan area (Kaliningrad Oblast) in 1947. Hoppe held that post until Pope Paul VI terminated the apostolic administration of Ermland diocese and finally appointed again a bishop to the see on 28 June 1972, then named Warmia (Polish for Ermland), however, not comprising the former diocesan area within the Soviet Union. Paul VI then elevated Hoppe to Apostolic Visitator of Ermland taking care of Ermland's diocesans living in Germany.

== Legacy ==
In July 1979, Kaller's successor, Warmia's Bishop Józef Glemp, visited Straelen, where he had earlier improved his German. On his way to Nuremberg, Glemp stopped in Königstein to visit Kaller's grave. On 10 October 1980, Kaller's 100th birthday, Glemp celebrated a pontifical requiem in honour of Kaller in Frombork's Archcathedral Basilica of the Assumption of the Blessed Virgin Mary and St. Andrew, Frombork, commemorating in his preaching Kaller's personality as priest and his benedictory work for the diocese. In 1997, Archbishop Edmund Michał Piszcz of Warmia and the community of Ermlanders in western Germany commemorated Kaller and placed busts of him in Germany and Poland. On 4 May 2003, the procedure for his beatification started.

== See also ==
- Reorganization of occupied dioceses during World War II

Catholic Church titles
Preceded by Robert Weimann as Apostolic Protonotar	Apostolic Administrator of Schneidemühl (Piła) elevated to Prelate of Schneideühl in 1930; 1926–1930	Succeeded by Franz Hartz as territorial prelate
Preceded by Augustinus Bludau	Bishop of Ermland; 1930–1947	Vacant Title next held by Józef Drzazga; 1947–1972 sede vacante
Preceded by Justinas Staugaitis as territorial prelate	Apostolic Administrator of Prelature of Klaipėda (Memel); 1939–1947	Vacant Title next held by Petras Maželis as territorial prelate 1947–1949 sede vacante
