= Dyczkowski =

Dyczkowski is a surname of Polish origin. Notable people with the surname include:

- Adam Dyczkowski (1932–2021), Polish Roman Catholic bishop
- Mark Dyczkowski (1951–2025), English Indologist, musician, and scholar
