= Edmund Nowicki =

Polish Roman Catholic bishop (1900 – 1971)

- Bishop of Gdańsk
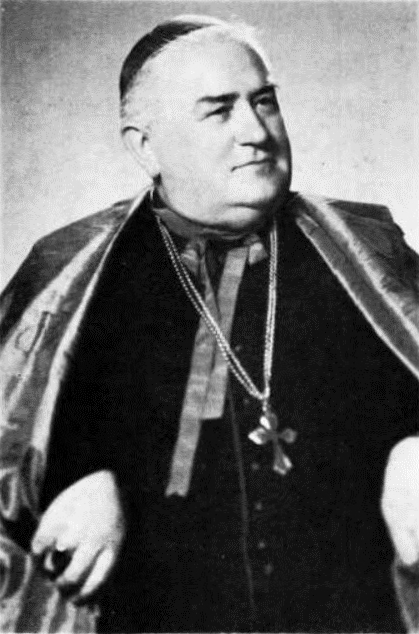
- Appointed: 5 March 1964
- Predecessor: Carl Maria Splett
- Successor: Lech Kaczmarek
- Previous post(s): Coadjutor bishop of Gdańsk (1951 – 1964); Titular bishop of Hadriane (1951 – 1964)

Orders
- Ordination: 15 March 1924 by Edmund Dalbor
- Consecration: 21 September 1954 by Walenty Dymek

Personal details
- Born: 13 September 1900; Trzemeszno
- Died: 10 March 1971 (aged 70); Warsaw
- Motto: Finis legis Christus

Edmund Nowicki (13 September 1900 – 10 March 1971) was a Polish Roman Catholic bishop of the Diocese of Gdańsk from 1964 until his death in 1971. He previously served as apostolic administrator of the Apostolic Administration of Kamień, Lubusz and the Prelature of Piła from 1945 to 1951 and coadjutor bishop of the Diocese of Gdańsk from 1951 to 1964.

== Biography ==
=== Early life & career ===
Nowicki was born in Trzemeszno to Zygmunt and Maria Nowicki (née Huebner). He attended a gymnasium in Nakło nad Notecią. Afterwards, he attended the diocesan seminary of the Archdiocese of Gniezno-Poznań – located in both Gniezno and Poznań – between 1919 and 1924. He was ordained a priest at Gniezno Cathedral on 15 March 1924 by Edmund Dalbor. After his ordination, Nowicki served as vicar for a parish based in Poznań between 1924 and 1927. In 1927, he was sent to Rome, where he studied canon law at the Pontifical Gregorian University until 1930; he was awarded a doctorate in canon law the same year. During his time studying at Rome, he worked as a clerk for the Roman Rota.

After returning to Poland, Nowicki worked as a notary for the archdiocesan curia between 1 July 1930 and 2 October 1939. He also served as adjutant judicial vicar for the archdiocesan court in Poznań from 1934. On 3 October 1939, Nowicki was arrested by German forces and was imprisoned at a jail on Młyńska Street in Poznań; he was transferred to a monastery in Kazimierz Biskupi in November 1939, followed by Fort VII and Dachau on 4 May 1940, where he was given the identification number 22032. On 2 August 1940, he was transferred to Mauthausen. He returned to Dachau on 8 December 1940 and was released on 6 February 1941, on the condition that he didn't perform priestly functions or renounce the priesthood. After his release, he served as a procurator for a timber company in Warsaw, before going into hiding in Warsaw and Zakopane under the name "Strzelecki".

=== Apostolic administrator of Kamień ===
Nowicki was appointed apostolic administrator of the Apostolic Administration of Kamień, Lubusz and the Prelature of Piła by August Hlond on 15 August 1945. Reflecting on his appointment, he stated, "We were entering the unknown without any resources whatsoever." He assumed his office on 1 September 1945. Nowicki ceremonially assumed control of the diocese on 16 September 1945 at Szczecin and 28 October 1945 at Gorzów Wielkopolski. As apostolic administrator, he established various church structures, including a curia in 1945, as well as an ecclesiastical court based in Poznań on 29 October 1950. In order to increase the amount of clergy in the apostolic administration, Nowicki established a seminary in Gorzów Wielkopolski — consecrated on 26 October 1946 — as well as three minor seminaries in Gorzów Wielkopolski, Wschowa and Słupsk. He also established a religious school in Szczecin, which operated from 1949 to 1952.

On 26 January 1951, Nowicki was removed from his position as apostolic administrator by Polish authorities after they had issued a regulation that dissolved temporary church administration in the Recovered Territories and made it possible to elect vicar capitulars. After he was removed, he fled to Poznań, where he stayed with a group of Sisters of Saint Elizabeth. He remained as a regional bishop, though he didn't have the power to ordain priests.

=== Coadjutor bishop & bishop of Gdańsk ===
On 26 April 1951, Nowicki was appointed by Pope Pius XII as coadjutor bishop sedi datus of the Diocese of Gdańsk and titular bishop of Hadriane. He was also appointed protonotary apostolic and canon of its cathedral chapter in 1952 (serving as the latter until his resignation in 1965). Nowicki was secretly consecrated as coadjutor bishop at the bishop's chapel in Poznań on 21 September 1954 by Walenty Dymek, with assistance from Franciszek Jedwabski and Lucjan Bernacki. As a result of Polish October, he would assume governance of the Diocese on 8 October 1956. He also participated in the Second Vatican Council. On 7 March 1964, Nowicki was appointed bishop of Gdańsk by Pope Paul VI. He assumed control of the diocese on 12 April 1964 at St. Mary's Church in Gdańsk.

As coadjutor bishop, and later bishop, of the Diocese of Gdańsk, he expanded the diocesan curia and formed a seminary at Oliwa, Gdańsk on 27 October 1957, which he entrusted to the Vincentians. He called the second diocesan synod of the Diocese of Gdańsk in April 1961, though it began in 1973 due to the Second Vatican Council. Nowicki died on 10 March 1971 in Warsaw; his funeral was held on 14 March 1971 and he was buried at Oliwa Cathedral.
