= Adolf Bertram =

German Roman Catholic cardinal (1859–1945)

His Eminence Adolf Bertram
- Archbishop of Breslau
- Bertram in 1916
- See: Breslau
- Elected: 27 May 1914
- Installed: 8 September 1914
- Term ended: 6 July 1945
- Predecessor: Georg von Kopp
- Successor: Capitular Vicar Ferdinand Piontek (as of 16 July 1945, since 1 September restricted to the East German archdiocesan area); Administrator Karol Milik (as of 1 September 1945, competent in the Wroclaw district of the Polish archdiocesan area)
- Other post: Cardinal-Priest of Sant'Agnese fuori le mura
- Previous posts: Bishop of Hildesheim (1906-1914); Bishop of Breslau (1914-1930 - elevated to Archbishop)

Orders
- Ordination: 31 July 1881
- Consecration: 15 August 1906 by Georg von Kopp
- Created cardinal: 4 December 1916 (in pectore); 5 December 1919 by Pope Benedict XV
- Rank: Cardinal-Priest

Personal details
- Born: Adolf Bertram; 14 March 1859 Hildesheim, Kingdom of Hanover
- Died: 6 July 1945 (aged 86) Schloß Johannesberg, Jauernig, Czechoslovakia
- Denomination: Roman Catholic
- Motto: veritati et caritati
- Coat of arms

Adolf Bertram (14 March 1859 – 6 July 1945) was archbishop of Breslau (now Wrocław, Poland) and a cardinal of the Catholic Church.

== Early life ==
Adolf Bertram was born in Hildesheim, Royal Prussian Province of Hanover (now Lower Saxony), Germany. He studied theology at the Ludwig-Maximilians-Universität München, the University of Innsbruck, and the University of Würzburg, where he obtained a doctorate in theology, and at the Pontifical Gregorian University in Rome, where he earned a doctorate in canon law in 1884. He was ordained a Roman Catholic diocesan priest in 1881. On 26 April 1906 he was elected bishop of Hildesheim, an election that received papal confirmation on 12 June 1906.

Eight years later, on 8 September 1914, the Pope confirmed his election by the cathedral chapter of Breslau as bishop of that see, and he took possession of it on 28 October. Since 1824 the title Prince-Bishop of Breslau was a merely honorific title granted to the incumbents of the see, without a prince-bishopric of secular rule wielded by the incumbent, but granting a seat in the Prussian House of Lords and in the Austrian House of Lords. This, however, was abolished when Austria and Prussia became republican after 1918. Bertram continued to use the title of prince-bishop also thereafter until he was ranked Archbishop of Breslau on 13 August 1930.

== Cardinal ==
On 4 December 1916 Bertram was created a cardinal but only in pectore for fear of provoking a negative reaction against the Church on the part of the Allies, especially from the Italian side.

After hostilities ceased, his appointment was published on 5 December 1919, and he was assigned the titular church of Sant'Agnese fuori le mura on 18 December 1919. From 1919 to his death, he was also Chairman of the Fulda Conference of Catholic Bishops, the highest representative of the Catholic Church in Germany.

=== Silesian uprisings ===
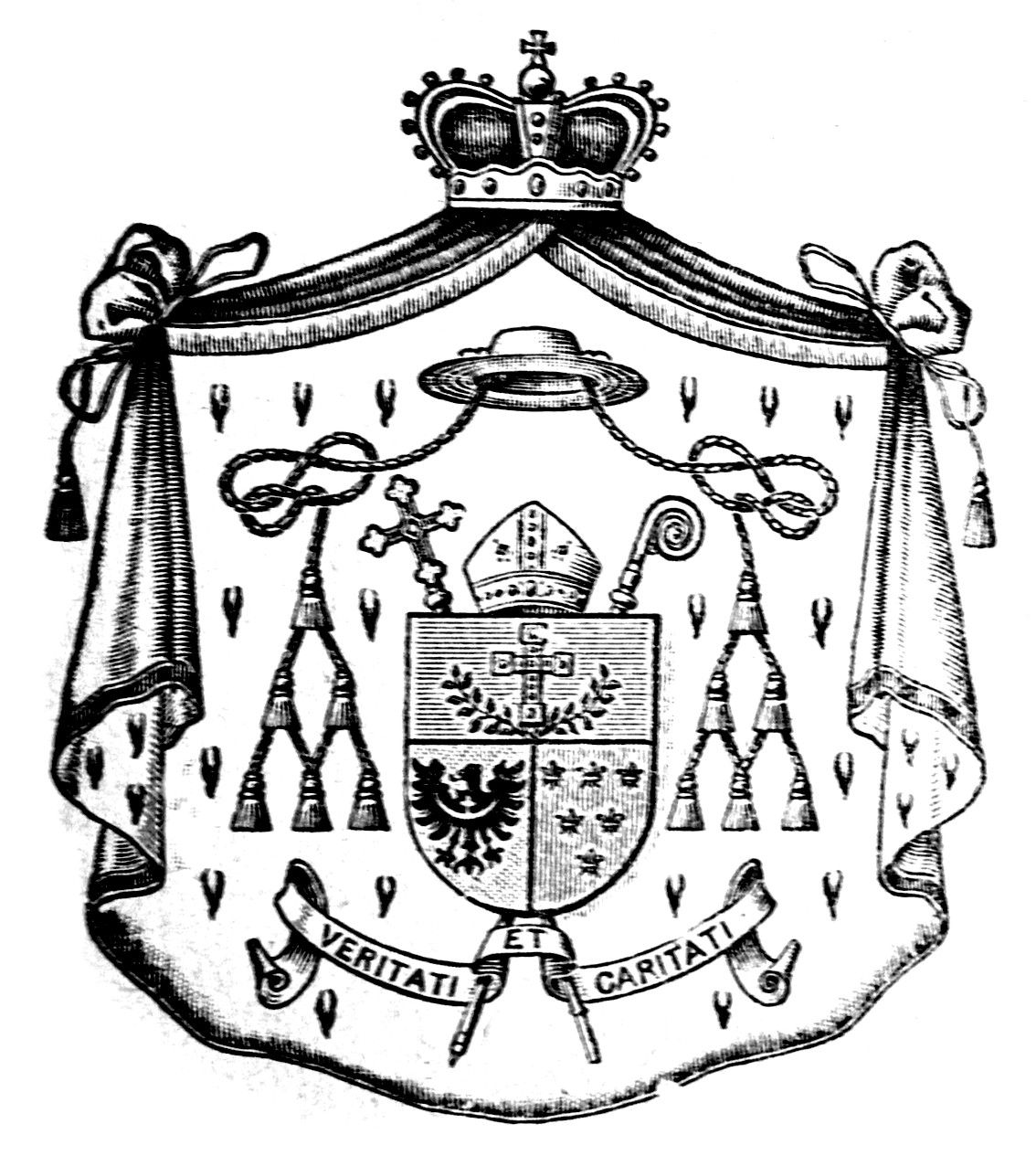
Cardinal Bertram's coat of arms as Prince-Bishop.

Throughout the Polish Uprisings against Germany in parts of Upper Silesia, he underlined his pro-German attitude, in line with his previous declaration of being a "German bishop" attached to the German state, which generated controversy and criticism from Poles. Throughout the upheaval, he tried to influence the Vatican on behalf of Germany. In turn, he was called a "German chauvinist" and accused of being "anti-Polish", as he removed Polish priests and replaced them with Germans in Upper Silesia during the events. He forbade Polish priests from taking part in Polish cultural and political activities but allowed German ones to participate in political agitation. Bertram questioned the decree of Pope Benedict XV that ordered him to refrain from visiting Upper Silesia during the Upper Silesia plebiscite, calling it "the result of Polish intrigue" by August Hlond, a personal friend of Benedict XV.

==== Order of 21 November 1920 ====
On 21 November 1920, four months before the Silesian Plebiscite, Bertram issued an order that made political activity of local priests dependent on the agreement of the local provost and supported by threat of severe church sanctions if broken. Since 75%-80% of provosts were of Germans, and local priests were regularly Polish Jesuit priests immigrated from Little Poland, that was seen as giving support to the German side in the plebiscite, and the Polish public reacted with anger. Wincenty Witos told Bertram that if not for his order, three quarters of Upper Silesian population would vote for Poland. In the end, almost 60% of Upper Silesians voted for Germany. The Polish government protested Bertram's decision to the Vatican, and the Polish Foreign Ministry began actions opposing the decree.

==== Conflict with Polish members of the clergy ====
A special committee of 91 priests from Upper Silesia issued a declaration to Holy See in which they warned of the consequences of Bertram's actions and growing "bitterness" among the population that would harm the Catholic Church in the long term. They called for a boycott of his order and declared loyalty to Vatican. Soon, the priests were supported by senior members of the Polish clergy. On 30 November, at the residence of Cardinals Aleksander Kakowski and Dalbor and Bishops Bilczewski, Sapieha, Teodorowicz, Fulman and Przeździecki issued a letter to Pope to warn him that Bertram engaged in political activity on behalf of German side and threatened to break relations between the Vatican and the Polish state as well as the Polish nation. Thy pleaded with the Pope to revoke Bertram's order.

As the consequences of Bertram's order became known, the Polish Parliament debated on breaking up relations with the Vatican or removing the Polish ambassador to the Vatican. Eventually, the Polish government decided to issue a protest note, and the Vatican revoked its delegate to Poland, Achille Ratti, who would later become Pope Pius XI.

On 7 November 1922, Bertram lost his episcopal competence in the parishes of Breslau diocese that had become part of Poland, namely in the prior Austro-Hungarian, now Polish eastern Cieszyn Silesia (Polish acquired 1918/1919), and the prior German East Upper Silesia (seized by Poland on 20 June 1922). On 17 December the Holy See established for these areas an exempt Apostolic Administration, which it elevated as the new Diocese of Katowice on 28 October 1925 by the bull Vixdum Poloniae Unitas. The parishes in northwesterly Czechoslovak Cieszyn Silesia (Trans-Olza) remained under Bertram's jurisdiction of Breslau.

=== Last years of Weimar Republic ===
By his bull "Pastoralis officii nostri" Pope Pius XI elevated Bertram to Archbishop of Breslau on 13 August 1930, carrying out the stipulations of the concordat between the Free State of Prussia and the Holy See. Bertram then supervised three suffragans within Breslau's new Eastern German Ecclesiastical Province, the dioceses of Berlin and Ermland as well as the Territorial Prelature of Schneidemühl.

In 1930, he refused a religious funeral for a well-known Nazi official on the grounds that the principles of National Socialism were incompatible with the Catholic faith.

In a widely publicized statement, he criticized as a grave error the one-sided glorification of the Nordic race and the contempt for divine revelation that was increasingly taught throughout Germany. He warned against the ambiguity of the concept of "positive Christianity", a highly nationalistic religion that the Nazis were encouraging. Such a religion, he said, "for us Catholics cannot have a satisfactory meaning since everyone interprets it in the way he pleases".

In 1932, he sought the permission of Rome regarding about joining the Nazi Party, but it was refused as the Church wanted no involvement with politics.

== Nazi dictatorship ==
In March 1933, the president of an interfaith group asked for Bertram's aid in protesting the boycott of Jewish business organised by the Nazis but was refused as he regarded it as purely an economic matter and because, in his opinion, the Jewish press had kept silent about the persecution of Catholics.

On the eve of the Second World War, Nazi Germany and, to a much lesser extent, Poland annexed parts of Czechoslovakia, Sudetenland and Trans-Olza, whose northern part was a component of Bertram's diocese. After the Polish takeover of Trans-Olza, which was never internationally recognised, the Polish government requested the Holy See to depose Bertram from jurisdiction in the newly-Polish annexed area. The Holy See complied, and Pope Pius XI then subjected the Catholic parishes in Trans-Olza to an apostolic administration under Stanisław Adamski, Bishop of Katowice, who wielded that administration until 31 December 1939.

=== World War II ===
He ordered Church celebrations upon Nazi Germany's victory over Poland and France, with an order to ring bells all across the Reich upon the news of the German capture of Warsaw in 1939. With his knowledge, the diocese of Breslau issued a statement calling the war with Poland a "holy war" fought to enforce God's orders on how to live and regain "German lost land".

Bertram as ex officio head of the German episcopate sent greetings on the occasion of Adolf Hitler's 50th birthday in 1939 in the name of all German Catholic bishops, an act that angered bishop Konrad von Preysing; Bertram was the leading advocate of accommodation as well as the leader of the German church, a combination that reined in other would-be opponents of Nazism.

Throughout most of World War II Cardinal Bertram remained in Breslau. Bertram opposed what he called the immorality and "neopaganism" of the Nazi Party. On 23 December 1939 Cesare Orsenigo, Nuncio to Germany, appointed – with effect of 1 January 1940 – Bertram – and Olomouc' Archbishop Leopold Prečan – as apostolic administrators for exactly those Catholic parishes of Trans-Olza, where Pius XI had deposed them in 1938.

In 1940, Cardinal Bertram condemned the propaganda and planning for Operation Lebensborn and Nazi vitalism and insemination plans as "immoral", saying that the Lebensborn programme was institutionalized "adultery".

A few months after his death, Time magazine wrote about Cardinal Bertram:

Died. Adolf Cardinal Bertram, 86, outspoken anti-Nazi Archbishop of Breslau and dean of the German Catholic hierarchy, whose tireless resistance to Hitler's "neopaganism" was climaxed last March in his defiance of orders to evacuate Breslau before the advancing Russians; presumably in Breslau. His death left the College of Cardinals with 40 members - the fewest in 144 years.

In early 1941 Bertram as metropolitan bishop of the Eastern German Ecclesiastical Province and speaker of the Fulda Conference of Bishops, rejected Carl Maria Splett's request to admit the Danzig diocese as member in his ecclesiastical province and at the conference.

== Last years and death ==
In 1945, as Soviet forces were attacking, he resisted pressure from the Nazi government to leave Breslau, until much of the population was evacuated. Bertram finally decided to leave the city in late February or early March 1945 and spent the rest of the war at his summer residence at Castle Johannesberg in Jauernig (Czechoslovak part of Breslau diocese, Sudetenland), where he died on 6 July 1945 at the age of 86.

He was buried at the local cemetery in Ves Javorník (Oberjauernig). His body was exhumed in 1991 and was reburied in the metropolitan cathedral in Wrocław, Poland. He was succeeded as Chairman of the Fulda Conference of Catholic Bishops by Josef Frings.

== Legacy ==
It has been claimed that Bertram scheduled a Requiem Mass upon Hitler's death. However, this claim has been disputed by Ronald Rychlak:

In point of fact, this is what we know: Bertram was elderly and ill when the war ended. When he died (just weeks later), his papers included a handwritten order scheduling a Requiem Mass for all Germans who died in the war, including Hitler (who was originally reported to have died while fighting the Red Army), and for the protection of the Catholic Church in Germany. This order was never sent, and the Mass was never held. Bertam's personal secretary later reported being unaware of this paper or any such proposed order. In fact, the order itself was crossed through with two broad strokes.

== Sources ==
- Friedrich Wilhelm Bautz (1975). "Bertram, Adolf". In Bautz, Friedrich Wilhelm (ed.). Biographisch-Bibliographisches Kirchenlexikon (BBKL) (in German). Vol. 1. Hamm: Bautz. cols. 557–558. ISBN 3-88309-013-1.
- Cornwell, John. Hitler's Pope. 1999. ISBN 0-670-88693-9.
- (in German) Schlesien in Kirche und Welt

Catholic Church titles
Preceded by Wilhelm Sommerwerck, called Jacobi	Bishop of Hildesheim; 1906-1914	Succeeded by Josef Ernst
Preceded by Prince-Bishop Georg von Kopp	Prince-Bishop, after 1930 Archbishop of Breslau; 1914–1945	Succeeded by Bolesław Kominek in 1972
Preceded by Karoly Hornig	Cardinal Priest of Sant'Agnese fuori le mura 1919–1945	Succeeded by Samuel Stritch
Preceded by Felix von Hartmann	Chairman of the Fulda Conference of Catholic Bishops; 1919-1945	Succeeded by Josef Frings
