= St. Mary's Cathedral, Gorzów Wielkopolski =

St. Mary's Cathedral
- Cathedral of the Assumption of the Blessed Virgin Mary
- Katedra Wniebowzięcia Najświętszej Maryi Panny
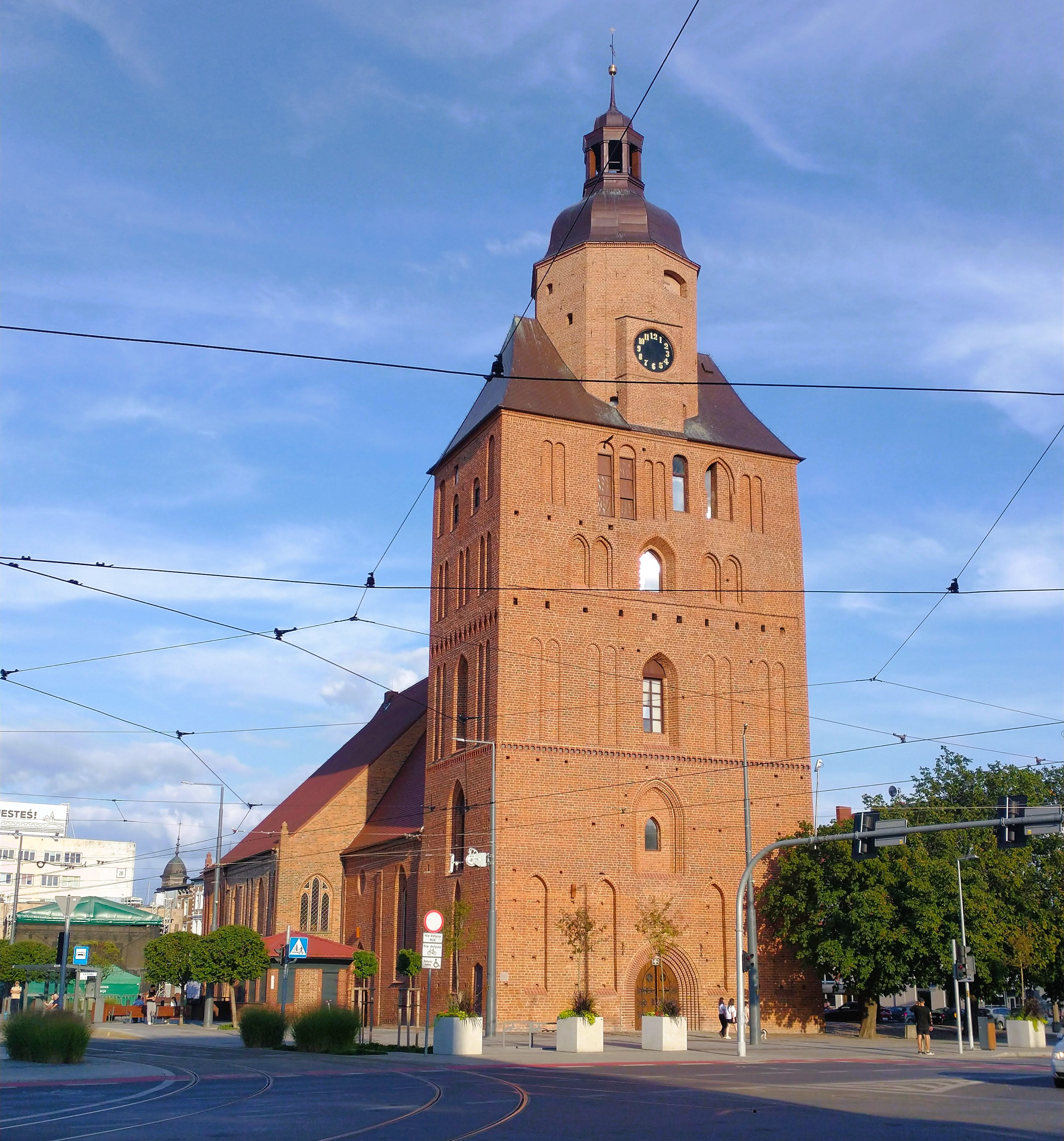

- 52.7308°N 15.2394°E
- Location: Gorzów Wielkopolski
- Country: Poland
- Language: Polish
- Denomination: Catholic

History
- Status: Cathedral
- Founded: 12th century
- Dedication: Assumption of Mary

Architecture
- Functional status: Active
- Heritage designation: Cultural heritage site
- Designated: 15 January 1954
- Style: Romanesque, Gothic
- Completed: 13th century

Administration
- Diocese: Zielona Góra-Gorzów

Clergy
- Bishop: Tadeusz Lityński

St. Mary's Cathedral (Polish: Katedra w Gorzowie Wielkopolskim), in full the Cathedral of the Assumption of the Blessed Virgin Mary (Polish: Katedra Wniebowzięcia Najświętszej Maryi Panny), is a Romanesque-Gothic cathedral in Gorzów Wielkopolski, Poland, seat of the Roman Catholic Diocese of Zielona Góra-Gorzów. It is one of the most precious and distinctive landmarks of Gorzów Wielkopolski.

== History ==
Gorzów Cathedral is the oldest building in the Polish city of Gorzów Wielkopolski. It was founded at the end of the 12th century on the site of the city's former church. The church changed its denomination to Protestantism in 1537, which was changed back in 1945 when the city became again part of Poland. The church was named a cathedral on December 12, 1945.

The cathedral houses a painting of the Assumption of the Virgin Mary from the altar of the Church of the Assumption of the Blessed Virgin Mary in Buchach.

On 1 July 2017 a fire broke out in the tower of the cathedral.

== Architecture ==
The cathedral was constructed in the gothic style, although it also includes romanesque elements.

== Gallery ==
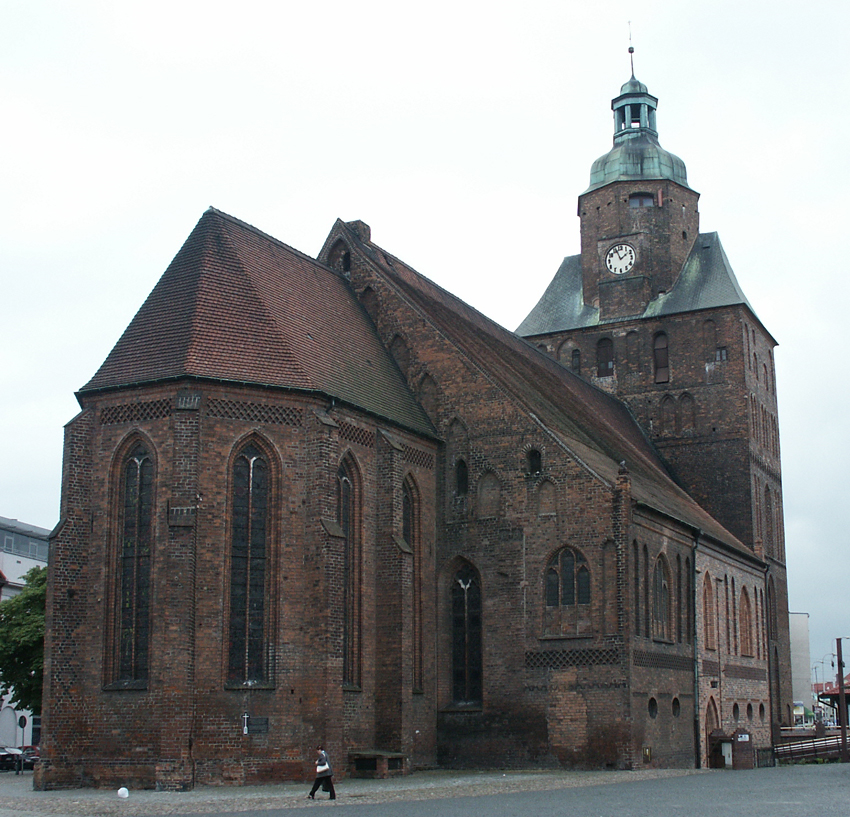
Exterior of the cathedral

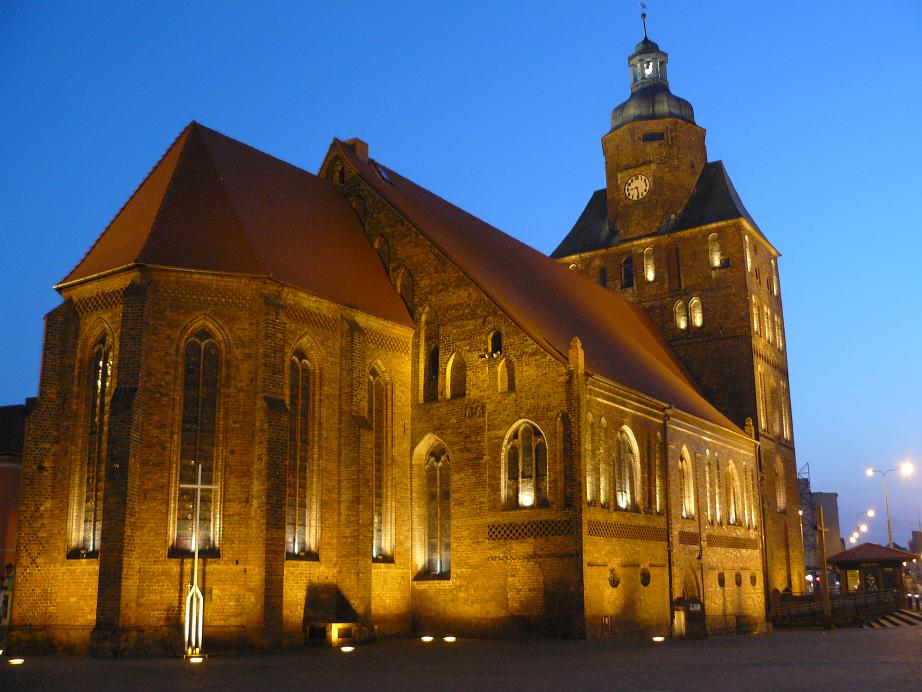
The cathedral at night

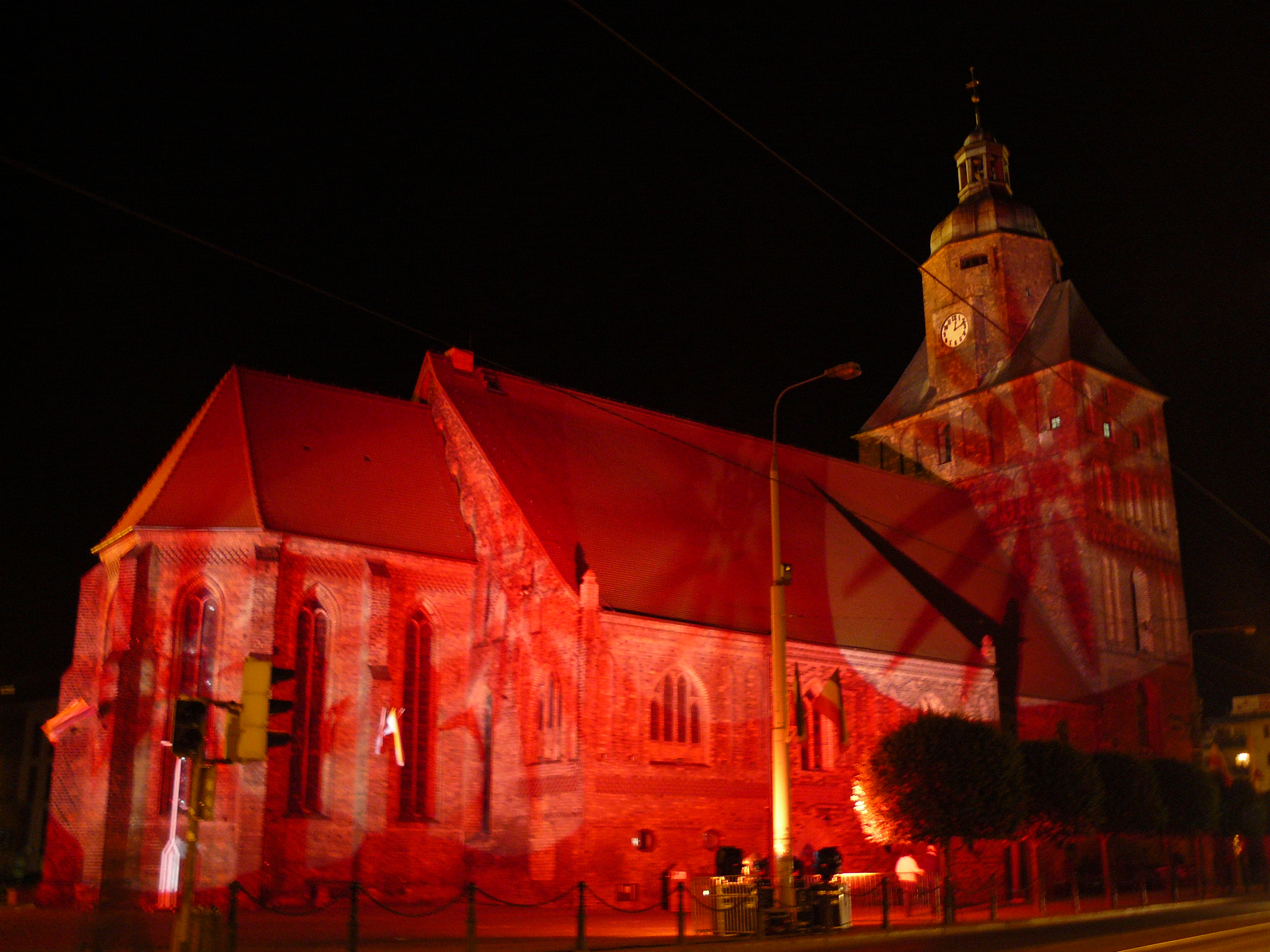
Illumination
