= Franz Scholz =

Franz Scholz (10 December 1909 – 1 September 1998) was a German priest and professor of theology from Breslau, Silesia. He had eight brothers and two sisters. His youngest brother Gerhard is now 86. He studied at Breslau's Catholic St.-Matthias-Gymnasium, then Caritas Science at Freiburg. He studied the Polish language at Kraków and Lublin. In 1934 he became a priest and took up a position as chaplain at Cross Church in Breslau. In this office Schulz attended to the spiritual needs of Polish seasonal workers in the Silesian capital city. After receiving his doctorate he transferred to St. Bonifacius Church in Görlitz.

In 1945, the eastern part of the city of Görlitz was split off and became known as Zgorzelec when the Polish-German border was redrawn. Because of his knowledge of Polish, Scholz was able to remain in Zgorzelec, but he chose to leave in 1946 when Germans who remained in the city were forced to adopt Polish citizenship.

Scholz went to the nearby city of Cottbus, but when it became part of the German Democratic Republic in 1949, he moved to West Germany. There, Scholz taught many classes dealing with morals and theology and he received many honors, including Papal Honorary Titles.

Professor Scholz was a theologian with many years of practical experience with parishioners and inmates, and he had experience with Polish life and people. He left a large volume of written material. He was especially opposed to the proposed beatification of the Primate of Poland, August Cardinal Hlond.

A commemorative plaque for Scholz was installed in the wall of 7 Czachowskiego Street in September 2018.
