= Diocese of Zielona Góra–Gorzów =

Latin Catholic diocese in Poland

Coordinates: 52°43′51″N 15°14′21″E

Diocese of Zielona Góra-Gorzów Dioecesis Viridimontanensis-Gorzoviensis Diecezja Zielonogórsko-Gorzowska

Catholic
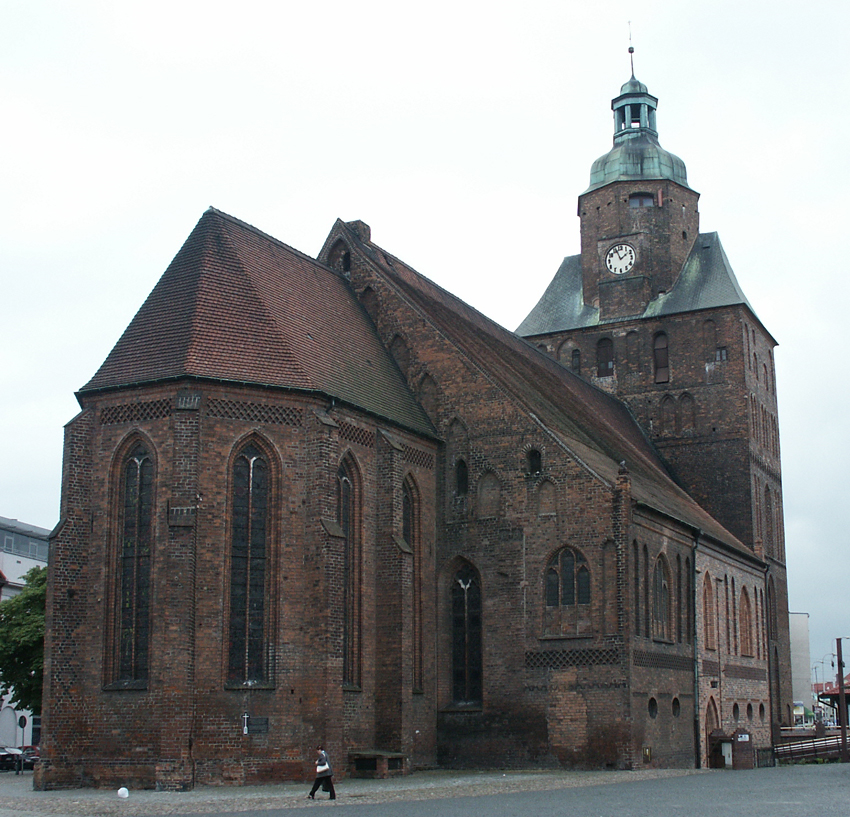
- Cathedral of the Assumption in Gorzów Wielkopolski

Location
- Country: Poland
- Ecclesiastical province: Szczecin-Kamień

Statistics
- Area: 10,805 km^{2} (4,172 sq mi)
- Population: Total; Catholics: (as of 2020); 1,062,734; 932,662 (87.8%)

Information
- Denomination: Catholic Church
- Sui iuris church: Latin Church
- Rite: Roman Rite
- Established: 1945 (as Apostolic Administration of Kamień, Lubusz and the Prelature of Piła); 8 June 1972 (As Diocese of Gorzów); 25 March 1992 (As Diocese of Zielona Góra-Gorzów)
- Cathedral: Katedra pw. Wniebowzięcia; Najświętszej Maryi Panny, Gorzów Wielkopolski
- Co-cathedral: Konkatedra św. Jadwigi in Zielona Góra

Current leadership
- Pope: Leo XIV
- Bishop: Tadeusz Lityński
- Metropolitan Archbishop: Andrzej Dzięga
- Auxiliary Bishops: Adrian Put
- Bishops emeritus: Stefan Regmunt (Bishop Emeritus)

Website
- Website of the Diocese

Map of Roman Catholic Diocese of Zielona Góra-Gorzów

The Diocese of Zielona Góra-Gorzów (Latin: Viridimontanensis-Gorzoviensis) is a Latin Church ecclesiastical jurisdiction or diocese of the Catholic Church in Poland. It is a suffragan in the ecclesiastical province of the metropolitan Archdiocese of Szczecin-Kamień.

Its cathedral is the Katedra Wniebowzięcia NMP in Gorzów Wielkopolski. It also has a co-cathedral dedicated to Hedwig of Silesia (called in Polish św. Jadwigi Śląskiej), in Zielona Góra, and a minor basilica, Bazylika Matki Bożej Rokitniańskiej, in Rokitno.

== History ==
- Established in 1945 as Apostolic Administration of Kamień, Lubusz and the Prelature of Piła with see in Gorzów Wielkopolski, on the territories encompassing the Territorial Prelature of Schneidemühl and the part of the Diocese of Berlin, Germany, awarded to Poland, with reference in the name to the historical Bishopric of Lebus and Bishopric of Cammin
- Established on 28 June 1972 as Diocese of Gorzów, part of the ecclesiastical province of Wrocław, from the southwestern part of the territory of the dissolved Apostolic Administration of Kamień, Lubusz and the Prelature of Piła with see in Gorzów Wielkopolski, formerly the western part of the Prelature of Schneidemühl, and the eastern part of the Diocese of Berlin, Germany
- 25 March 1992: Renamed as Diocese of Zielona Góra – Gorzów and made part of the newly established ecclesiastical province of Szczecin-Kamień, lost territory to Diocese of Koszalin-Kołobrzeg
- It enjoyed a Papal visit from the Polish Pope John Paul II in June 1997.

== Statistics ==
As of 2014, it pastorally served 989,400 Catholics (85.3% of 1,160,000 total) on 14,814 km^{2} in 267 parishes and 2 missions with 641 priests (542 diocesan, 99 religious), 283 lay religious (107 brothers, 176 sisters) and 53 seminarians. Like in most Polish dioceses, church attendance has declined in the 21st century. According to the statistics 28.1% of the diocese's population attended church services weekly in 2013, however more than 40% did so back in 2000.

== Episcopal ordinaries ==
Apostolic Administrators and Vicars of Kamień, Lubusz and the Prelature of Piła with see in Gorzów Wielkopolski

- 1945–1951: Administrator Edmund Nowicki (1900–1971), deposed and banished by Bolesław Bierut government
- 1951–1952: Vicar Tadeusz Załuczkowski
- 1952–1956: Vicar Zygmunt Szelążek
- 1956–1958: Administrator Teodor Bensch (1903–1958)
- 1958: Józef Michalski
- 1958–1972 see below: Administrator Wilhelm Pluta (1910–1986), advanced to Bishop of Gorzów

Diocesan Bishops of Gorzów

- Wilhelm Pluta (see above 1972.06.28 – death 1986.01.22)
- Józef Michalik (1986.10.01 – 1992.03.25 see below)

Diocesan Bishops of Zielona Góra-Gorzów

- Józef Michalik (see above 1992.03.25 – 1993.04.17), next Metropolitan Archbishop of Przemyśl (Poland) (1993.04.17 – retired 2016.04.30), Vice-President of Episcopal Conference of Poland (1999 – 2004.03.18), President of Episcopal Conference of Poland (2004.03.18 – 2014.03.12), Vice-President of Council of European Bishops’ Conferences (2011.10.02 – 2014.10)
- Adam Dyczkowski (1993.07.17 – 2007.12.29)
- Stefan Regmunt (2007.12.29 – 2015.11.23)
- Tadeusz Lityński (since 2015.11.23)

=== Auxiliary Bishops ===
- Edward Dajczak (1989.12.15 – 2007.06.23)
- Paweł Socha, C.M. (1973.11.20 – 2012.01.16)
- Adrian Put (since 28 June 2022)

== See also ==
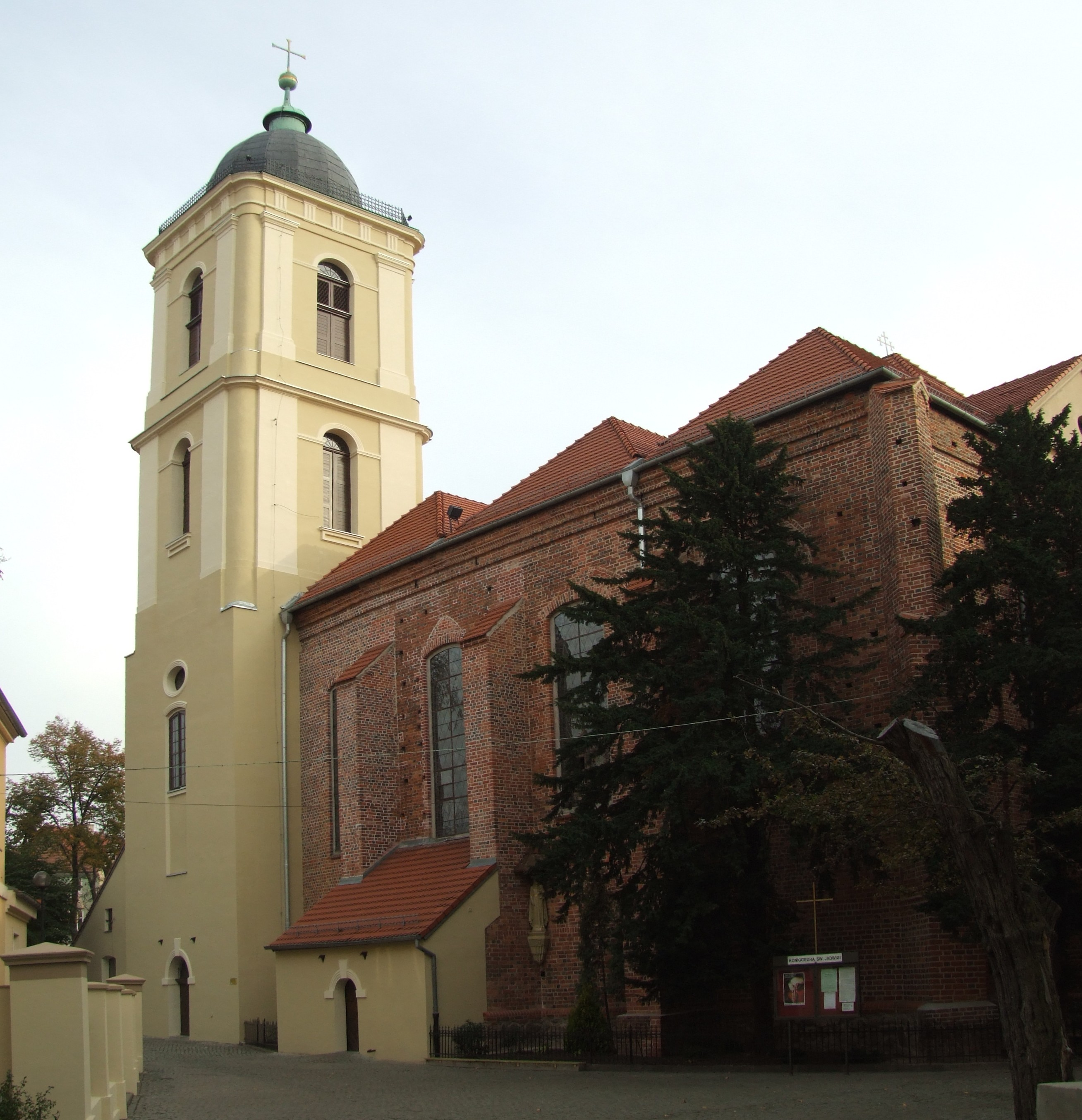
Co-Cathedral of St Hedwig in Zielona Góra

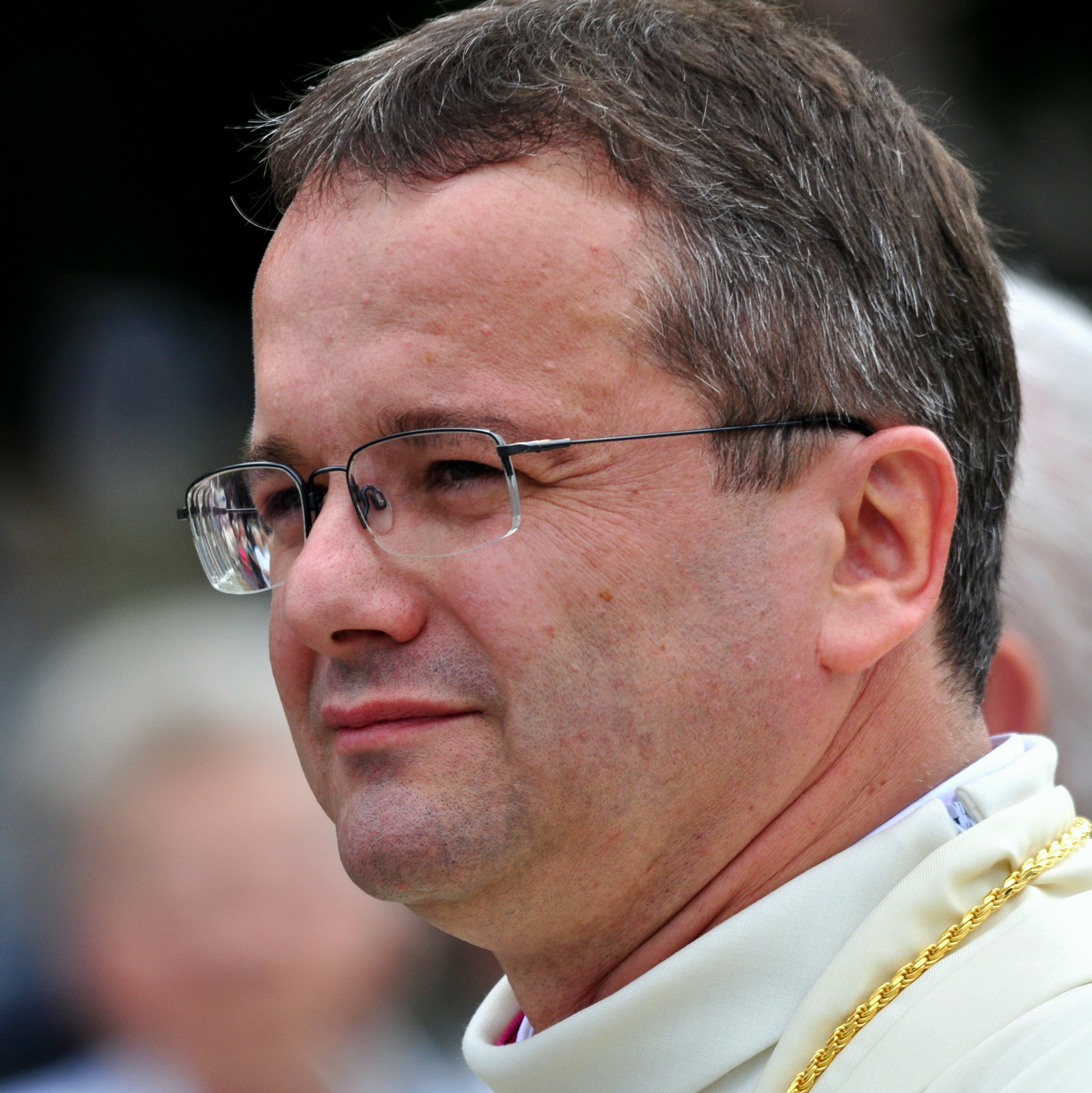
Bishop Tadeusz Lityński

- List of Catholic dioceses in Poland
- Roman Catholicism in Poland

== Sources and external links ==
- GCatholic.org, with Google satellite map - data for all sections
- Catholic Hierarchy
