= Carl Maria Splett =

German Roman Catholic priest (1898–1964)

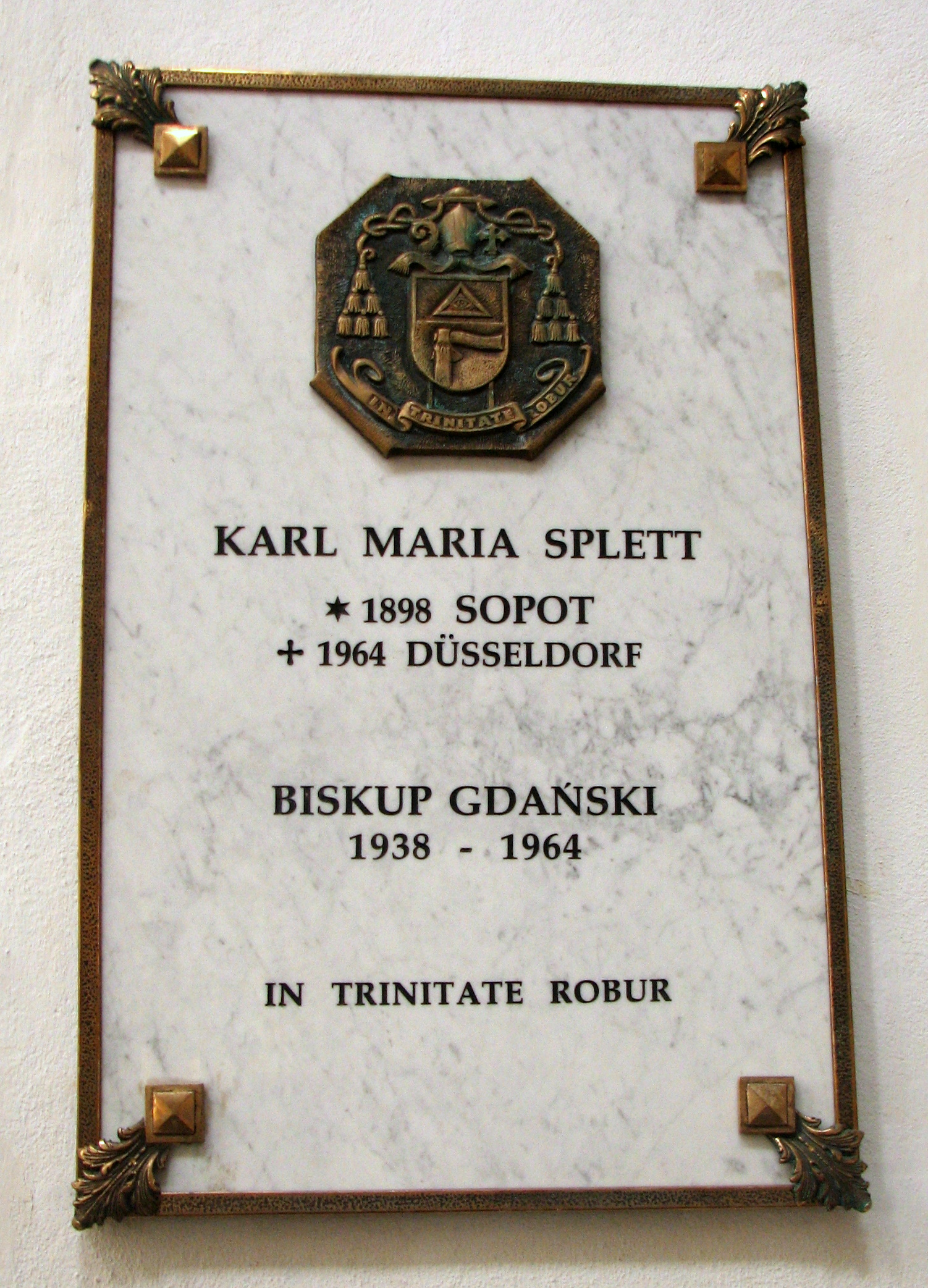
Plaque at Oliwa Cathedral

Carl Maria Splett (17 January 1898 – 5 March 1964) was a German Roman Catholic priest and Bishop of Danzig (Gdańsk) who had a controversial role during World War II, especially as apostolic administrator of the Diocese of Culm. After the war, he was accused in Poland of collaboration with the Nazi regime, sentenced to a prison term and later deported to West Germany.

== Early life and career ==
Splett was born in Zoppot (Sopot) to the teacher and later vice-president of the Free City of Danzig's Parliament (Volkstag), Franz Splett. He attended school in Konitz (Chojnice), Neustadt (Wejherowo) and Danzig (Gdańsk), where he passed his Abitur in 1917. Splett studied theology and philosophy at the seminary of the Diocese of Kulm in Pelplin, where he also learned Polish. He was ordained on 10 July 1921 and, after graduating at Pelplin, was sent to Rome for further studies, especially in canon law; he practiced at the Sacra Rota Romana.

Splett returned to Danzig in 1924 and became a vicar at several congregations within the Apostolic Administration of Danzig (elevated to diocese in 1925). He was further promoted to cathedral capitular of Oliva in 1935. According to Czesław Madajczyk, Splett had close relations with Albert Forster, a Nazi, and pursued plans to replace Polish with German clergy. Bolesław Kumor claims Splett provided Forster with housing when the official first arrived in the city, and Forster, in return, supported Splett politically; as a result Splett enjoyed full support from the Nazi Party. Forster praised Splett's work for Nazis: "This is my man, I can fully rely on his work".

Splett succeeded Edward O'Rourke as the head of the Roman Catholic Diocese of Danzig in 1938. While the Nazis, who had ruled the Free State of Danzig since 1933, tried to install their own candidate, Paul Schütz, as successor of Bishop O'Rourke, Splett was appointed as bishop by the pope. Splett also refused to appoint Schütz as vicar general, as demanded by the local Nazis. Zofia Waszkiewicz claims that he was supported by Forster, who became his protector.

Splett himself on 20 April 1939 ordered churches to ring bells to celebrate Hitler's 50th birthday and ordered prayers on his behalf.

== World War II ==
Splett held the position as Bishop of Danzig also after the German annexation of the Free City during World War II. On 4 September 1939, Splett issued a letter to churches in which he praised the German invasion of Poland and annexation of the city, and he recommended his flock to pray for God's blessing on Hitler. Immediately after the invasion, Gauleiter Forster demanded the Vatican to appoint Splett as Apostolic Administrator of the Diocese of Culm. The Polish bishop, Wojciech Okoniewski, was forced to flee in the face of the Nazi invasion, and his auxiliary, Konstantyn Dominik, was interned by the Germans. The Vatican had its doubts, but Pope Pius XII on 6 December 1939 agreed to the Germans' demands. His appointment was protested by the Polish government-in-exile as a violation of a concordat signed with Rome. Splett had close relations to the Albert Forster, who praised Splett's work for Germany. Splett replaced Polish clergy with Germans, introducing 200 German priests into the Chełmno Diocese in which he took office from December 1939.

After the invasion of Poland, seven of the twelve Polish priests and four German priests of his diocese were murdered. Under his rule, the Polish priesthood was oppressed and prayers, and Masses under his direction praised Hitler. He also issued a ban against use of the Polish language in churches. When he banned confessions in Polish in May 1940, the Vatican intervened and ordered that the ban be lifted. Splett defended his ban and even argued it was to "protect" people going to Confessions. After that argument, he tried to claim that Confessions in Polish are used for "nationalistic means". Eventually, the Vatican accepted his explanation.

Besides banning the Polish language, Splett ordered the removal of Polish signs and names in cemeteries from monuments and graves and in all churches under his jurisdiction. When a family asked him to save three imprisoned Polish priests in Stuthoff Camp he told them that "Polish priests are no apostles but traitors".

Bohdan Pietka states that Splett through his obedient and servile attitude towards Nazis not only led to the destruction of Polish religious life in the city but also, by his indifferent attitude, contributed to the brutal extermination of the Polish clergy and the plunder of Polish churches.

According to Samerski, several parishes were seized, and after Splett initially refused to prohibit the usage of Polish in his diocese, another six priests were arrested by the Gestapo, which forced him to ban the usage of Polish in his diocese in April or May 1940.

According to Dieter Schenk, Splett proteste on 5 September 1939 the arrest of Catholic priests and in February 1940 sent a list of Catholic priests who were victims of persecution after the German invasion of Poland to the Reichskanzlei, the German Red Cross, the Wehrmacht High Command, the Reichssicherheitshauptamt and the Gauleitung. Peter Raina points out that the priests whom Splett sought to protect were mostly of German ethnicity. not Polish. Schenk stresses that Splett did not collaborate but bowed to the murderous pressure of the Nazis, and Peter Raina disputes that he was under any pressure or danger and states that Splett's actions were done in full awareness.

On 8 October 1940, Gauleiter Forster praised Splett by stating that he "continues to fulfill all my wishes and orders".

In October 1942, Splett wrote to Reich Marshal Hermann Goering a letter in which he declared himself a "German bishop" and stated his willingness and dedication to the spread of German culture to all churches in his diocese. In the letter, he listed efforts made by him to pursue Germanization of Polish territories and boasted that by doing this he "fulfilled to no end his duty as a German bishop".

== Trial in Poland ==
He remained in Gdansk after the Soviet Union occupied the city in March 1945 and was arrested by the Red Army on 25 March 1945, but he was soon released. He continued administering to the remaining Catholic inhabitants, who had not escaped, as well as the newly-arriving Polish settlers.. In early August 1945, Polish Cardinal August Hlond requested Splett to resign from his position, which Splett refused to do. On 9 August, Splett was arrested by Polish officials and put on trial for collaboration and oppression of the Polish people. The trial involved 36 people, of which 22 were priests and 4 nuns

Stefan Samerski reports that throughout his custody, Hlond pretended that Pope Pius XII had disbanded Splett, which was not the case. Hlond criticised Splett's refusal to resign, as the Catholic Church in Poland was in conflict with communist authorities, and Splett's decision gave them ammunition against the Church. Splett was sentenced to eight years in prison on 1 February 1946 and imprisoned at Wronki Prison. After his release from prison, Splett was kept under domiciliary arrest at Borek Stary, in southern Poland, and at the monastery of Dukla.

Robert Żurek, deputy director of the Polish Centre of Historical Research in Berlin, regards it as a show trial and part of the Polish government's anti-Catholic policy after World War II. Its aim was to portray the papal policy as anti-Polish since the Vatican had entrusted a Polish diocese to a "German chauvinist". Żurek stresses that in a statement of 16 January 1946 even the Polish Bishop of Katowice, Stanisław Adamski, emphasises Splett's merits regarding pastoral care in occupied Poland.

Adamski pointed out that Splett acted under massive pressure from the Gestapo and that the Nazis attempted to make the bishop appear as the initiator of their anti-Polish policy. Despite the pressure of Polish authorities, all Catholic priests interrogated as witnesses made exculpatory testimonies.

Polish officials were, however, not actually interested in the background of Splett's actions. The real intention of the trial was to justify the termination of the Concordat of 1925 by the Polish authorities and to segregate the Polish Catholic Church from the Vatican.

The historian Peter Raina states that the trial was fair and Splett was allowed to defend himself extensively and freely and without difficulties or obstructions. For Raina, it was not a show trial, the guilt of Splett was evident; and he would have gotten the same verdict if placed under trial at Nuremberg. Jan Żaryn writes that although the attacks on Splett were often insulting, they were not without merit because of his servile attitude toward the Gestapo. Professor Jerzy Serczyk writes that due to Splett's anti-Polish actions during the war, there was hardly any disapproval in Polish society towards sentencing Splett

== Later life in West Germany ==
In 1956, after protests from West Germany and by the Polish Primate Cardinal Stefan Wyszynski, the new Polish government allowed his emigration to West Germany. He remained official Bishop of Danzig until his death in 1964 and was active in pastoral care for the expelled population of Danzig. Upon his return he sought contact and worked with the Bund der Danziger ("Federation of Danzigers"), an organisation of Germans formerly living in Gdansk that demanded the annexation of the Polish city as well as "evacuation of Poles from our homeland". A publication with which Splett was engaged West Germany was Unser Danzig ("Our Danzig") in which Splett published in 1958 that the German right to Polish territories was supported by the Pope himself. According to the German historian Dieter Schenk, both Bund der Danziger and Unser Danzig served as cover for many former Nazi activists and officials after the war.

Splett played an active role in the improvement of the German-Polish relations throughout the Second Vatican Council.

The administrative position of the Bishop of Gdańsk was held by lesser church officials. Splett was succeeded by Edmund Nowicki, his coadjutor bishop since 1956.

Splett died in Düsseldorf.
