= Edmund Dalbor =

Polish Cardinal

His Eminence Edmund Dalbor
- Archbishop of Gniezno; Archbishop of Poznań
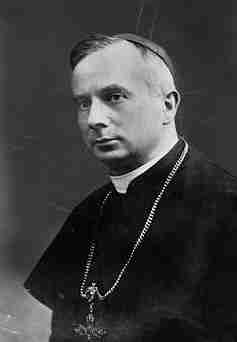
- Church: Roman Catholic Church
- Archdiocese: Gniezno; Poznań
- See: Gniezno; Poznań
- Appointed: 30 June 1915
- Term ended: 13 February 1926
- Predecessor: Edward Likowski
- Successor: August Hlond
- Other posts: Cardinal-Priest of San Giovanni a Porta Latina (1919-26); President of the Polish Episcopal Conference (1919-26)

Orders
- Ordination: 25 February 1893 by Lucido Maria Parocchi
- Consecration: 21 September 1915 by Felix von Hartmann
- Created cardinal: 15 December 1919 by Pope Benedict XV
- Rank: Cardinal-Priest

Personal details
- Born: Edmund Dalbor; 30 October 1869 Ostrów Wielkopolski, Province of Posen
- Died: 13 February 1926 (aged 56) Poznań, Second Polish Republic
- Buried: Gniezno Cathedral
- Education: Pontifical Gregorian University

- Coat of arms

Styles of Edmund Dalbor
- Reference style: His Eminence
- Spoken style: Your Eminence
- Religious style: Cardinal
- Informal style: Cardinal

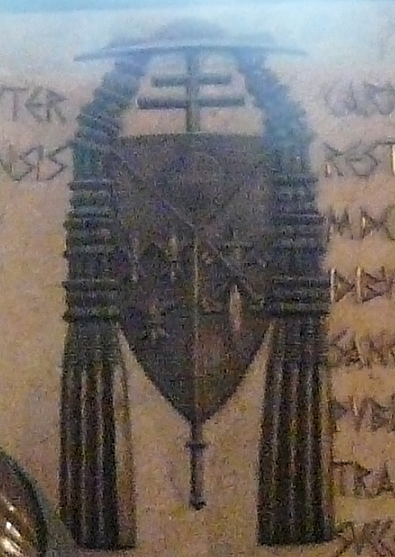
Edmund Dalbor's coat-of-arms on his burial monument in Gniezno Cathedral

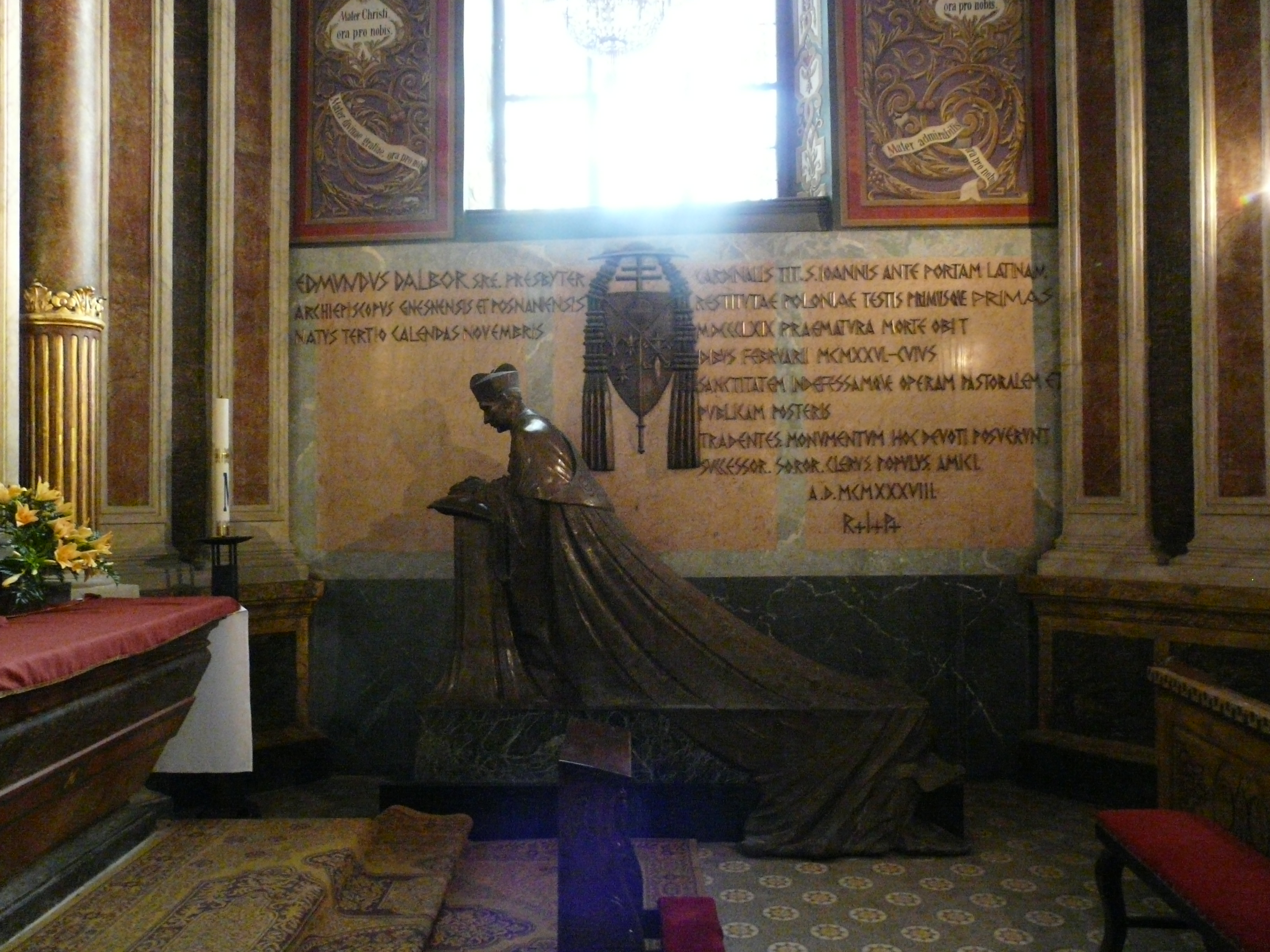
Cardinal Dalbor's burial monument in Gniezno Cathedral

Edmund Dalbor (30 October 1869 – 13 February 1926) was a Polish Cardinal of the Roman Catholic Church. He served as Archbishop of Gniezno and Poznań, thus Primate of Poland, from 1915 until his death. Dalbor was elevated to the cardinalate in 1919.

== Biography ==
Edmund Dalbor was born in Ostrów Wielkopolski to Władysław and Katarzyna (née Rutkowska) Dalbor. Confirmed on 7 November 1889, he was educated at the Men's Grammar School in Ostrow, the University of Münster, and the seminary of Gniezno and Poznań before traveling to Rome in 1892 to further his studies.

Whilst in Rome, Dalbor was ordained to the priesthood by Cardinal Lucido Parocchi on 25 February 1893. He obtained his doctorate in canon law from the Pontifical Gregorian University on 6 July 1894, and became a parochial vicar in Poznań upon returning to Poland. After serving as vicar of the archcathedral and director of the chancery, Dalbor went to Gniezno, where he was a professor at its seminary and penitentiary of its cathedral. He became a canon theologian of the cathedral chapter of Poznań in 1901, also serving as confessor and chaplain of the Sisters of Charity of Saint Elizabeth. He was raised to the rank of vicar general of Poznań in 1909 and Domestic Prelate of His Holiness on 23 November 1914.

On 30 June 1915, Dalbor was appointed Archbishop of Gniezno and Poznań by Pope Benedict XV; as Archbishop, he was also the spiritual leader of the Church in Poland. He received his episcopal consecration on the following 21 September from Felix Cardinal von Hartmann, with Bishops Adolf Bertram and Wilhelm Kloske serving as co-consecrators.

Benedict XV created him Cardinal-Priest of San Giovanni a Porta Latina in the consistory of 15 December 1919. Dalbor later participated in the papal conclave of 1922, which elected Pope Pius XI.

In 1926, Dalbor established the Polish Catholic Mission in Belgium.

The Cardinal died in Poznań, at age 56. He is buried in the cathedral of Gniezno.

Catholic Church titles
Preceded by Edward Likowski	Primate of Poland; 1915–1926	Succeeded by August Hlond
Preceded by Edward Likowski	Archbishop of Gniezno; 1915–1926	Succeeded by August Hlond
Preceded by Edward Likowski	Archbishop of Poznań; 1915–1926	Succeeded by August Hlond
