= List of Catholic dioceses in Germany between 1821 and 1993 =

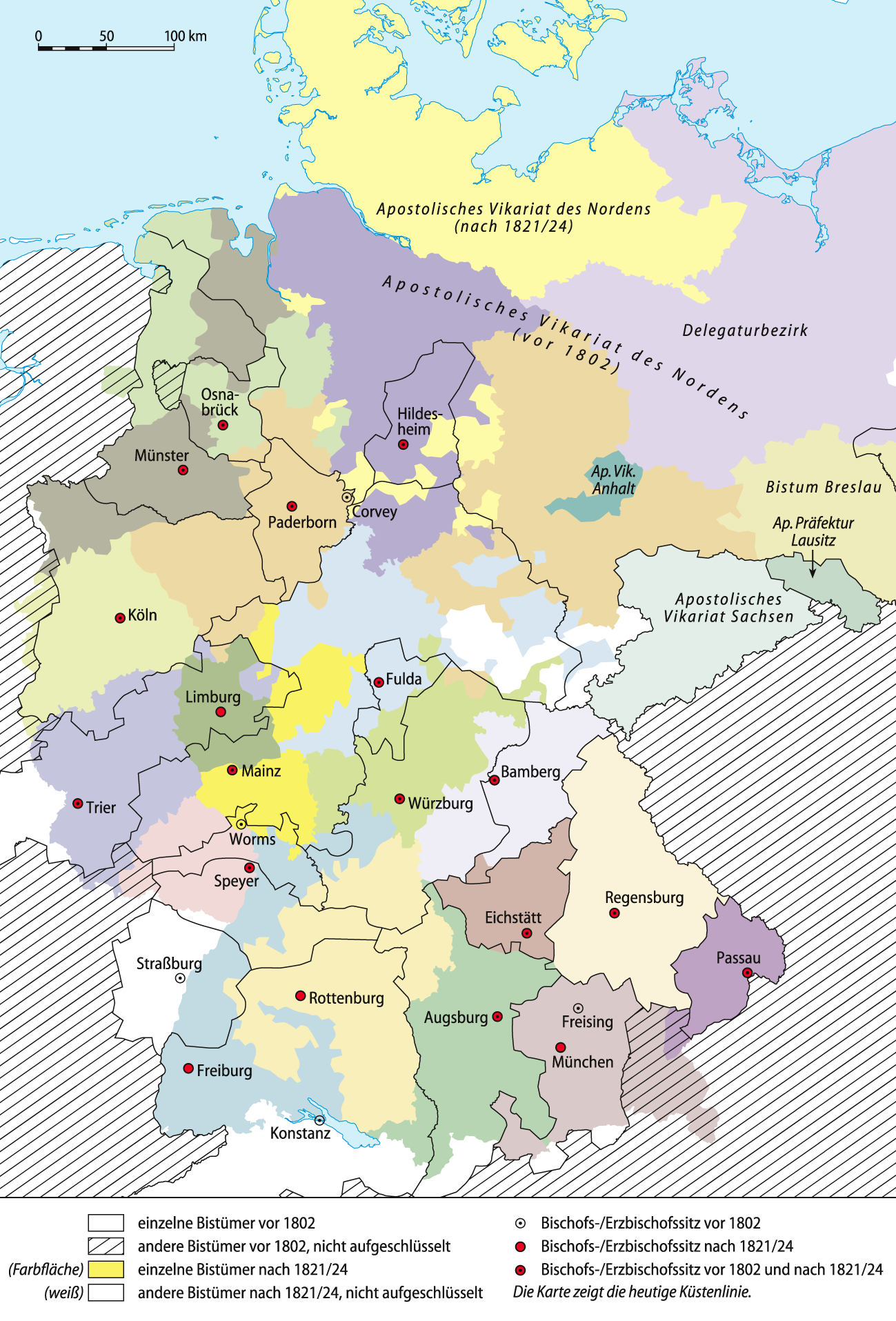
The reorganisation of the Roman Catholic dioceses in Germany after 1818: Pre-Napoleonic diocesan borders as black lines, new diocesan areas as different-coloured fields, episcopal sees by 1824 as red spots.

This list refers to the Roman Catholic dioceses and ecclesiastical provinces in Germany and the organisational changes between 1821 and 1994. The territorial changes through and after the Napoleonic Wars determined much of today's diocesan boundaries. The territorial changes after the World Wars were followed by new diocesan boundaries in the 1920s and 1970s. Internal reorganisations took place in the 1930s, 1950s and early 1990s.

== Fulda Conference of Bishops ==
This conference, preceding today's Conference of German Bishops, was established as the Würzburg Conference of Bishops (only 1848) and as a regular institution named the Fulda Conference since 1867. Renamed into the German Bishops' Conference in 1965.

=== Ecclesiastical Province of Bamberg ===
This ecclesiastical province was founded in 1818.

- Archdiocese of Bamberg
  - Diocese of Eichstätt
  - Diocese of Speyer
  - Diocese of Würzburg

=== Eastern German Ecclesiastical Province ===
This ecclesiastical province emerged in 1930 and was dissolved in 1972. Diocesan areas east of the Oder-Neiße line were under apostolic administration by Polish clergy since 1945.

- Archdiocese of Breslau (Wrocław), since 1930, partially under Polish apostolic administration 1945–1972, then East German part dissected and the rest part of Polish episcopate
  - Diocese of Berlin, est. 1930, partially under Polish apostolic administration 1945–1972, then Polish diocesan area dissected
  - Diocese of Ermland (Warmia), since 1930, under Polish apostolic administration 1945–1972, then part of Polish episcopate
  - Prelature of Schneidemühl (Piła), est. 1930, under Polish apostolic administration since 1945, dissolved in 1972

=== Ecclesiastical Province of Gnesen-Posen ===
This historically Polish ecclesiastical province was made part of the Fulda Conference in 1821 and disentangled in 1918–1919 to join the Episcopal Conference of Poland.

- Archdiocese of Gnesen (Gniezno),
  - in personal union with the Diocese of Posen (Poznań)
  - Diocese of Culm (Chełmno), to Poland in 1920,
- Apostolic Administration of Tütz (Tuczno) - the parts of the abovementioned dioceses which remained with Germany 1920–1923, then disentangled to form together the Territorial Prelature of Schneidemühl (Piła), subordinate to Archdiocese of Breslau (Wrocław)
- Apostolic Administration of the Free City of Danzig; later, the exempt Diocese of Danzig (Gdańsk)

=== Middle German Ecclesiastical Province ===
- Archdiocese of Paderborn, since 1930
  - Diocese of Fulda, since 1930
  - Diocese of Hildesheim, 1930–1994, then part of the Ecclesiastical Province of Hamburg

=== Ecclesiastical Province of Munich and Freising ===
This ecclesiastical province was founded in 1821.

- Archdiocese of Munich and Freising
  - Diocese of Augsburg
  - Diocese of Passau
  - Diocese of Regensburg

=== Rhenish Ecclesiastical Province ===
This ecclesiastical province was founded in 802; it is also called ecclesiastical province of Cologne.

- Archdiocese of Cologne, newly Belgian Eupen-Malmedy dissected in 1921
  - Diocese of Aachen, est. 1930
  - Diocese of Essen, est. 1958
  - Diocese of Münster
  - Diocese of Osnabrück, 1930–1994, then part of the Ecclesiastical Province of Hamburg
  - Diocese of Paderborn, elevated to metropolia of the Middle German Ecclesiastical Province in 1930
  - Diocese of Trier

=== Upper Rhenish Ecclesiastical Province ===
This ecclesiastical province was founded in 1821; it is also called ecclesiastical province of Freiburg im Breisgau.

- Archdiocese of Freiburg im Breisgau, est. 1821
  - Diocese of Fulda, changed to Middle German Ecclesiastical Province in 1930
  - Diocese of Limburg, changed to Rhenish Ecclesiastical Province in 1930
  - Diocese of Mainz
  - Diocese of Rottenburg-Stuttgart

== Exempt dioceses ==
- Apostolic Vicariate of Anhalt, after territorial cessions to Hildesheim diocese in 1834 merged in the Diocese of Paderborn in 1921
- Diocese of Berlin, exempt 1972–1994, then elevated to metropolia of the Ecclesiastical Province of Berlin
- Diocese of Breslau (Wrocław), exempt 1821–1930, then elevated to metropolia of the Eastern German Ecclesiastical Province
  - Prince-Episcopal Delegation for Brandenburg and Pomerania, elevated to Diocese of Berlin in 1930
- Diocese of Ermland (Warmia), exempt 1566–1930, then part of the Eastern German Ecclesiastical Province
- Apostolic Administration of Görlitz, dissected from Breslau archdiocese in 1972, elevated to diocese in 1994 within the Ecclesiastical Province of Berlin
- Diocese of Hildesheim, exempt 1805–1930, then part of the Middle German Ecclesiastical Province
- Apostolic Prefecture of Meissen, elevated to Diocese of Meissen in 1921
- Diocese of Meissen, est. 1921, small diocesan area under Polish apostolic administration 1948–1972, then dissected, renamed Dresden–Meissen in 1980, part of the Ecclesiastical Province of Berlin since 1994
- Diocese of Metz, from France in 1871, to France in 1918–1919
- Apostolic Vicariate of the Nordic Missions, after territorial cessions renamed into Apostolic Vicariate of the Nordic Missions of Germany, merged in the Diocese of Osnabrück in 1930
- Diocese of Osnabrück, part of the Rhenish Ecclesiastical Province since 1930
- Apostolic Vicariate of the Saxon Hereditary Lands, merged in Diocese of Meissen in 1921
- Apostolic Prefecture of Schleswig-Holstein, dissected from Nordic Missions in 1868, newly Danish North Schleswig to Denmark apostolic vicariate in 1921; rest merged in Diocese of Osnabrück in 1930
- Diocese of Straßburg (Strasbourg), from France in 1871, to France in 1918–1919
- Apostolic Administration of Tütz, dissected from Gnesen–Posen and Culm in 1923, elevated to Schneidemühl prelature within Eastern German province in 1930

== See also ==
- List of Roman Catholic dioceses in Germany
- Catholic Church in Germany
