= August Hlond =

Polish Catholic cardinal priest (1881–1948)

Venerable August Hlond SDB
- Cardinal, Archbishop of Gniezno and Warsaw; Primate of Poland
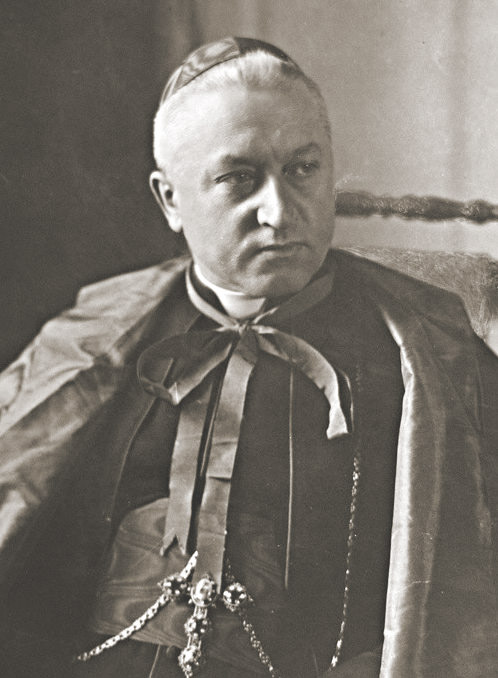
- Hlond, c. 1938
- Church: Catholic Church
- Archdiocese: Gniezno & Warsaw
- See: Gniezno & Warsaw
- Appointed: 4 March 1926
- Term ended: 22 October 1948
- Predecessor: Edmund Dalbor
- Successor: Stefan Wyszyński
- Other post: Cardinal-Priest of Santa Maria della Pace (1927-1948)
- Previous posts: Bishop of Katowice (1925–1926); Archbishop of Poznań (1926-1946)

Orders
- Ordination: 23 September 1905 by Anatol Wincenty Novak
- Consecration: 3 January 1926 by Aleksander Kakowski
- Created cardinal: 20 January 1927 by Pope Pius XI
- Rank: Cardinal-Priest

Personal details
- Born: August Hlond; 5 July 1881 Brzęczkowice, German Empire (now Mysłowice, Poland)
- Died: 22 October 1948 (aged 67) Warsaw, Poland
- Buried: St. John's Cathedral, Warsaw
- Denomination: Roman Catholic Church
- Residence: Roman Catholic Archdiocese of Warsaw
- Parents: Jan Hlond & Maria Hlond (née Imiela)
- Education: Salesian Oratory, Turin; Pontifical Gregorian University
- Motto: Da mihi animas, caetera tolle

- Coat of arms

Sainthood
- Venerated in: Catholic Church

Styles of August Hlond
- Reference style: His Eminence
- Spoken style: Your Eminence
- Informal style: Cardinal
- See: Poznań, Gniezno and Warsaw

August Józef Hlond, SDB (5 July 1881 – 22 October 1948) was a Polish Salesian prelate of the Catholic Church who served as Archbishop of Poznań and Gniezno from 1926 to 1946 and as Archbishop of Gniezno and Warsaw from 1946 until his death. He was the Primate of Poland from 1926 to 1948 and was elevated to the rank of cardinal by Pope Pius XI in 1927. As the highest-ranking Catholic leader in interwar and postwar Poland, Hlond played a pivotal role in guiding the Polish Church through the tumultuous periods of the Second Polish Republic, the Nazi occupation during World War II, and the early years of the communist regime.

Hlond's ecclesiastical career was marked by his efforts to strengthen the Catholic Church in Poland amid political upheaval. He founded the Society of Christ for Polish Emigrants in 1932 to support Polish diaspora communities. During World War II, he was the only member of the College of Cardinals arrested by the Gestapo, enduring imprisonment from 1944 to 1945. In exile earlier in the war, he reported Nazi atrocities against Poles and Jews to the Vatican and the world via radio broadcasts. Postwar, he criticized the Soviet-backed communist government, clashing with authorities over church autonomy and education.

Hlond's legacy is complex. He has been praised for his pastoral leadership and anti-communist stance. However, he has been criticized for antisemitic statements, his response to postwar anti-Jewish violence, and his actions in removing ethnic German bishops from Polish-administered territories after the war. The cause for his beatification opened in 1992, and he was declared venerable by Pope Francis in 2018.

== Early life ==
August Józef Hlond was born on 5 July 1881 in Brzęczkowice, a small mining village in Upper Silesia within the German Empire (now part of Mysłowice, Poland). He was the second of twelve children born to Jan Hlond, a railway worker, and Maria Imiela. The family lived in modest circumstances, typical of working-class Silesian households, where Catholicism was deeply ingrained in daily life. Hlond's early exposure to religious devotion came from his parents, who instilled in their children a strong faith and work ethic.

From a young age, Hlond showed an interest in religious life. At the age of 12, inspired by stories of Saint John Bosco and the Salesians of Don Bosco, he followed his older brother Ignacy to Turin, Italy, to join the Salesian congregation. This move was facilitated by the Salesians' outreach to Polish youth in Silesia, where economic hardship and German cultural pressures encouraged emigration for education. In Turin, Hlond immersed himself in the Salesian oratory environment, which emphasized education, vocational training, and spiritual formation for young boys.

== Education and ordination ==
Hlond's formal education began at the Salesian Oratory in Turin, where he completed secondary studies. In 1896, he entered the Salesian novitiate, making his first religious vows the following year. He pursued philosophical studies at the Pontifical Gregorian University in Rome, earning a doctorate in philosophy in 1900. Returning to Poland, he completed his theological formation in Kraków, where he was ordained a priest on 23 September 1905 by Bishop Anatol Nowak.

Post-ordination, Hlond served in various Salesian institutions in Poland, focusing on youth education. In 1907, he was appointed director of a new Salesian house in Przemyśl, and by 1909, he was sent to Vienna as headmaster of a boys' secondary school. There, he expanded the school's facilities and integrated Polish cultural elements into the curriculum, aiding Polish immigrants in the Austro-Hungarian Empire. His administrative skills led to his appointment as Provincial of the Salesians for Austria, Hungary, and Germany in 1919, a role he held amid the postwar reconfiguration of Central Europe.

== Early ministry and episcopal appointments ==
Coat of Arms of August Hlond as Bishop of Katowice (1925–1926)

Following the dissolution of Austria-Hungary after World War I, Hlond returned to Poland to assist in rebuilding the Church in the newly independent Second Polish Republic. In 1922, Pope Pius XI appointed him Apostolic Administrator of Polish Upper Silesia, a region contested between Poland and Germany following the Silesian Uprisings. Hlond organized the Church administration, establishing parishes and promoting Polish Catholic identity. On 14 December 1925, the Diocese of Katowice was erected, and Hlond was named its first bishop. He was consecrated on 3 January 1926 by Cardinal Aleksander Kakowski in Katowice Cathedral. As bishop, he focused on social issues, including workers' rights in the industrial region, and crowned the miraculous image of Our Lady of Piekary in 1925, a significant event for Silesian Catholics.

== Primate of Poland and cardinalate ==
Coat of Arms of August Hlond as Archbishop of Gniezno and Poznań (1926–1946)

Hlond's rapid rise continued when he succeeded Cardinal Edmund Dalbor as Archbishop of Poznań and Gniezno on 24 June 1926, becoming Primate of Poland at age 45. His installation coincided with Poland's political instability under Józef Piłsudski's regime. As primate, Hlond advocated for Church independence and moral renewal, speaking in multiple languages to engage internationally.

Pope Pius XI created him a cardinal-priest on 20 June 1927, assigning him the titular church of Santa Maria della Pace. Hlond's cardinalate enhanced his influence, allowing him to address global Catholic concerns. In 1932, with Father Ignacy Posadzy, he founded the Society of Christ for Polish Emigrants, aimed at pastoral care for Poles abroad, reflecting his Salesian roots in missionary work.

Hlond's 29 February 1936 pastoral letter "On Catholic Moral Principles" addressed social ethics but included controversial remarks on the "Jewish problem." He accused Jews of opposing the Church, promoting atheism, Bolshevism, and moral corruption, while advocating boycotts of Jewish businesses. Though he condemned violence and acknowledged virtuous Jews, the letter was seen as endorsing antisemitism, drawing criticism from Jewish groups.

In the 1930s, Hlond condemned social escapism and urged the Church to confront contemporary evils. He participated in Vatican diplomacy, including the 1939 papal conclave that elected Pope Pius XII.

== World War II ==
The German invasion of Poland on 1 September 1939 ignited World War II. The Nazis targeted the Polish Catholic Church, viewing it as a pillar of national resistance. In annexed territories, churches were closed, clergy arrested, and properties seized.

At the Polish government's request, Hlond fled to Romania on 18 September 1939, then to Rome, where he reported Nazi atrocities to the Vatican. His dispatches detailed priestly persecutions, including forced labor and executions. Vatican Radio broadcast his reports in January 1940, later used in the Nuremberg Trials.

Exiled in Lourdes, France, from March 1940, Hlond continued advocacy. After France's fall, he resided at Hautecombe Abbey. In February 1944, the Gestapo arrested him—the only cardinal so detained—holding him in Paris and attempting to coerce anti-Soviet statements. Hlond refused, demanding German withdrawal from Poland. Transferred to Bar-le-Duc and then Wiedenbrück, he was liberated by American forces on 1 April 1945. He returned to Rome before arriving in Poland on 20 July 1945.

Hlond's 1941 report to Vatican Secretary Luigi Maglione noted Polish perceptions of Pius XII's silence on Nazi persecutions, though Hlond himself remained loyal to the pope.

== Postwar period ==
Returning to a devastated Poland, Hlond faced the Yalta Conference's territorial shifts, with Poland losing eastern lands to the Soviet Union and gaining western territories from Germany. He supported Polish administration of these "Recovered Territories" by appointing Polish bishops and removing ethnic German ones, including Maximilian Kaller of Warmia and Carl Maria Splett of Danzig. This aligned with Polish nationalist policies but drew criticism for ethnic insensitivity.

Pope Pius XII appointed him Archbishop of Warsaw on 4 March 1946, unifying the primatial sees. Installed amid massive crowds, Hlond rebuilt the Church, filling vacant sees and reconnecting with Rome. He clashed with the communist regime over nationalized schools and censorship. In pastoral letters, he denounced persecution, comparing it to early Christian trials.

Hlond's postwar replacement of German bishops with Poles in former German territories supported Polish integration but was criticized as contributing to the expulsion of Germans. Theologian Franz Scholz opposed his beatification on these grounds.

Postwar, Hlond's response to the Kielce pogrom, which killed 42 Jews, denied racism, attributing it to Jewish involvement in communism—a common antisemitic trope. The American Jewish Committee, citing this stance, expressed concern regarding his 2018 Venerable declaration.

== Death and burial ==
Hlond died on 22 October 1948 in Warsaw from pneumonia complications, aged 67. His funeral drew thousands, symbolizing resistance to communism. He was buried in the crypt of St. John's Archcathedral, Warsaw. In March 2006, his remains were transferred to the Chapel of St. John the Baptist.

== Cause for beatification ==
The cause for Hlond's beatification opened in Warsaw on 9 January 1992, granting him the title Servant of God. The positio was submitted to the Congregation for the Causes of Saints in 2008. On 19 May 2018, Pope Francis declared Hlond venerable, confirming his heroic virtue. As of December 2025, the process awaits recognition of a miracle for beatification. The postulator is Salesian priest Pierluigi Cameroni.

Critics, including Jewish organizations and scholars, have questioned the cause due to Hlond's controversial statements and actions.

== Legacy ==
Hlond is remembered as a steadfast defender of Polish Catholicism amid oppression. His anti-communist stance influenced successors like Cardinal Stefan Wyszyński and Pope John Paul II. The Society of Christ continues his missionary legacy. However, his views on Jews and ethnic policies complicate his historical assessment.

== Hierarchical offices ==
Catholic Church titles
Preceded by New creation Adolf Bertram (as Archbishop of Breslau)	Apostolic Administrator of Upper Silesia; 1922–1925	Succeeded by himself (as Bishop of Katowice)
Preceded by New creation himself (as Apostolic Administrator)	Bishop of Katowice; 1925–1926	Succeeded by Arkadiusz Lisiecki
Preceded by Edmund Dalbor	Archbishop of Poznań; 1926–1946	Succeeded by Walenty Dymek
Preceded by Edmund Dalbor	Primate of Poland; 1926–1948	Succeeded by Stefan Wyszyński
Preceded by Aleksander Kakowski	Archbishop of Warsaw; 1946–1948	Succeeded by Stefan Wyszyński
Preceded by Patrick O'Donnell	Cardinal-Priest of Santa Maria della Pace; 1927–1948	Succeeded by Maurice Feltin
