= Adam Dyczkowski =

20th-century Polish Catholic bishop (1932–2021)

Mgr. Adam Dyczkowski
- Bishop of Zielona Góra-Gorzów
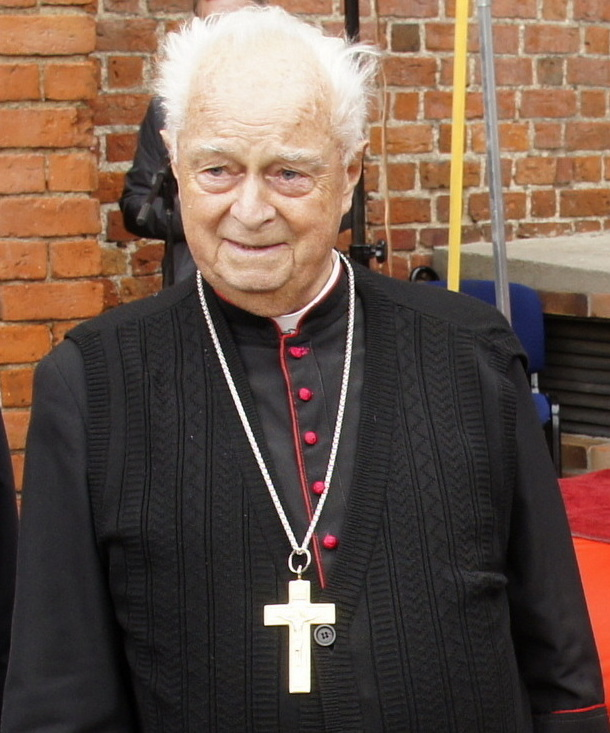
- Church: Roman Catholic Church
- Archdiocese: Szczecin-Kamień
- Diocese: Zielona Góra-Gorzów
- In office: 1993 – 2007
- Predecessor: Józef Michalik
- Successor: Stefan Regmunt
- Previous posts: Auxiliary Bishop of Wrocław (1978–1992); Auxiliary Bishop of Legnica (1992–1993); Titular Bishop of Tigillava (1978–1993)

Orders
- Ordination: 24 June 1957 by Bolesław Kominek
- Consecration: 25 November 1978 by Henryk Roman Gulbinowicz
- Rank: Bishop

Personal details
- Born: 17 November 1932 Kęty, Poland
- Died: 10 January 2021 (aged 88) Zielona Góra, Poland
- Motto: Sursum Corda
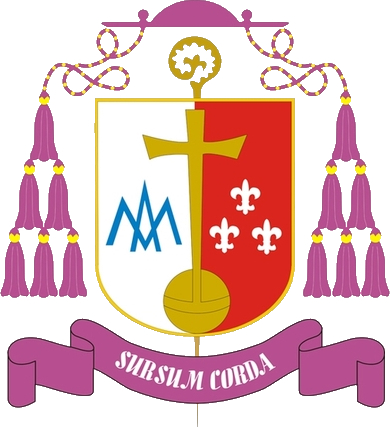
- Coat of arms: Adam Dyczkowski's coat of arms

Adam Feliks Dyczkowski (17 November 1932 – 10 January 2021) was a Polish Roman Catholic bishop.

Dyczkowski was born in Poland and was ordained to the priesthood in 1957. He served as titular bishop of Altava and as an auxiliary bishop of the Roman Catholic Archdiocese of Wrocław, Poland, from 1978 to 1992. He also served as an auxiliary bishop of the Roman Catholic Diocese of Legnica in 1992 and 1993. Later, he became the bishop of the Roman Catholic Diocese of Zielona Góra-Gorzów, Poland, holding the position from 1993 to 2007.

Dyczkowski died from COVID-19 on 10 January 2021, during the COVID-19 pandemic in Poland.
