= List of encyclicals of Pope Pius XI =

This article contains a list of encyclicals of Pope Pius XI. Pius XI issued 31 papal encyclicals during his reign as pope and was considering one at his death.

No.	Title (Latin, except where is noted)	Title (English translation)	Subject	Date
1.	Ubi arcano Dei consilio	"The Hidden Counsel of God"	"On the Peace of Christ in His Kingdom"	23 December 1922
2.	Rerum omnium perturbationem	"Disturbance of All Things"	On St. Francis De Sales	26 January 1923
3.	Studiorum ducem	"The Guide in Studies"	On St. Thomas Aquinas	29 June 1923
4.	Ecclesiam Dei	"The Church of God"	On St. Josaphat Kuntsevych	12 November 1923
5.	Maximam gravissimamque	"The Greatest and Gravest"	On French Diocesan Association	18 January 1924
6.	Quas primas	"In The First"	On the Feast of Christ the King	11 December 1925
7.	Rerum Ecclesiae	"Of the Things of the Church"	Catholic Missions	28 February 1926
8.	Rite expiatis	" "	On St. Francis of Assisi	13 April 1926
9.	Iniquis afflictisque	"Unequal and Afflicted"	On the Persecution of the Church in Mexico	18 November 1926
10.	Mortalium animos	"The Minds of Mortals"	On Religious Unity	6 January 1928
11.	Miserentissimus Redemptor	"Most Merciful Redeemer"	Reparation to the Sacred Heart	8 May 1928
12.	Rerum orientalium	"Of Eastern Things"	Promoting Oriental Studies	8 September 1928
13.	Divini cultus	"Of Divine Worship"	On Divine Worship	20 December 1928
14.	Mens nostra	"Our Mind"	Promotion of the Spiritual Exercises	20 December 1929
15.	Divini illius Magistri	"That Divine Teacher"	On Christian Education	31 December 1929
16.	Quinquagesimo ante	"Fifty Years Ago"	On His Priestly Jubilee	23 December 1929
17.	Ad salutem	"For Salvation"	On St. Augustine	30 April 1930
18.	Casti connubii	"Chaste Wedlock"	On Christian marriage	31 December 1930
19.	Quadragesimo anno	"In the Fortieth Year"	On the Reconstruction of the Social Order	15 May 1931
20.	Non abbiamo bisogno (in Italian)	"We Do Not Need"	Catholic Action in Italy	29 June 1931
21.	Nova impendet	"A New Scourge Threatens"	On the Economic Crisis	2 October 1931
22.	Lux veritatis	"The Light of Truth"	On the Council of Ephesus	25 December 1931
23.	Caritate Christi compulsi	"The Love of Christ Impels Us"	On the Sacred Heart	3 May 1932
24.	Acerba animi	"Sorrow of Soul"	On the Persecution of the Church in Mexico	29 September 1932
25.	Dilectissima Nobis	"Most Dear to Us"	On the Persecution of the Church in Spain	3 June 1933
26.	Ad Catholici sacerdotii	"To the Summit of Catholic priesthood"	On the Catholic priesthood	20 December 1935
27.	Vigilanti cura	"Vigilant Care"	On Motion Pictures	29 June 1936
28.	Mit brennender Sorge (in German)	"With Burning Anxiety"	On the Church and the German Reich	14 March 1937
29.	Divini Redemptoris	"Of a Divine Redeemer"	On Atheistic Communism	19 March 1937
30.	Nos es muy conocida (in Spanish)	"It Is Well Known to Us"	On the Religious Situation in Mexico	28 March 1937
31.	Ingravescentibus malis	"The Increasing Evils"	On the Rosary	29 September 1937

At the time of his death, Pius XI was reviewing an early version of an additional encyclical, Humani generis unitas (On the Unity of the Human Race), on the church, anti-Semitism, racism, and persecution of Jews.
