= Syllabus (disambiguation) =

Syllabus most commonly refers to an outline and summary of topics to be covered in an education or training course.

Syllabus may also refer to:

- Syllabus (legal), describing an initial paragraph in a judgement, describing the Laws used in the case.
- A summary of points decided by Roman Catholic papal decree regarding heretical doctrines or practices, including:
  - Syllabus of Errors, a document issued by Holy See under Pope Pius IX on December 8, 1864
  - Syllabus against racism, a historical pre-World War II Vatican document released in order to condemn racism and national-socialist ideology
- The Syllabus (1999), the first album by the Christian rap artist, Knowdaverbs
