= Anti-clericalism in Mexico =

Opposition to religious authority in Mexico

The modern history of anticlericalism has often been characterized by deep conflicts between the government and the Catholic Church, sometimes including outright persecution of Catholics in Mexico.

== Beginning of anticlericalism and persecution ==
In one form or another, anticlericalism has been a factor in Mexican politics since the Mexican War of Independence from the Spanish Empire (1810-1821), which is attributable to the frequent change in government and those governments' eagerness to access wealth in the form of the property of the Church. Mexico was born after its independence as a confessional state, with its first constitution (1824) stating that the religion of the nation was and would perpetually be Catholic, and prohibiting any other religion.

After the Revolution of Ayutla (1854-1855), nearly all of the top figures in the government were Freemasons and fierce anticlericalists. In 1857, a Constitution was adopted under which Benito Juárez attacked the property rights and possessions of the Church. The supporters of tradition backed the ill-fated Second Mexican Empire (1863-1867) supported by the Second French Empire. When Maximilian I of Mexico was deposed and killed, the country saw a series of anti-clerical governments. Then after the moderate Porfirio Díaz there was a strong resurgence of anticlericalism.

In 1917, a new Constitution was enacted, hostile to the Church and religion, which promulgated an anti-clericalism similar to that seen in France during the Revolution. The new Mexican Constitution was hostile to the Church as a consequence of the support given by Catholic church authorities to the dictatorship of Victoriano Huerta. The 1917 Constitution outlawed teaching by the Church, gave control over Church matters to the state, put all Church property at the disposal of the state, outlawed religious orders and foreign-born priests, gave states the power to limit or eliminate priests in their territory, deprived priests of the right to vote or hold office, prohibited Catholic organizations which advocated public policy and religious publications from commenting on policy, prohibited clergy from religious celebrations and from wearing clerical garb outside of a church, and deprived citizens of the right to a trial for violations of these provisions. One political scientist stated that the gist of the 1917 constitution was to "effectively outlaw the Roman Catholic Church and other religious denominations"; it also emboldened Communist labor unions, paving the way for anti-religious governments.

== Calles presidency and Cristero War ==
As a reaction against the strict enforcement of the above anti-clerical articles in the constitution of 1917 in Mexico, specifically Article 130, armed conflict broke out in the Cristero War (also known as the Cristiada) of 1926 to 1929. This was a civil war between Catholic rebels called Cristeros and the anti-clerical Mexican government of the time that was mainly localized in central Western states in Mexico.

Though conflict between church and state had marked the presidency of Álvaro Obregón (1920–1924), who "accused the clergy of being insincere and of producing conflict" but "spoke of Jesus Christ as 'the greatest socialist who has been known to Humanity'", it was with the election of President Plutarco Elías Calles in 1924 that anti-clerical laws were stringently applied throughout the country. Calles added a requirement that prohibited priests from ministering unless licensed by the state. State officials began to limit the number of priests so that vast areas of the population were left with no priest at all. Churches were expropriated for use as garages, museums and the like, and the Mexican bishops, deported or underground, as a last resort of protest suspended all remaining ministry and urged the people to protest the persecution of their faith. One contemporary is quoted as saying that "while President Calles is sane on all other matters, he completely loses control of himself when the matter of religion comes up, becomes livid in the face and pounds the table to express his hatred." Wearing clerical garb outside of churches was outlawed during his rule and priests exercising their right of political speech could be imprisoned for five years. On November 18, 1926, Pope Pius XI promulgated the encyclical Iniquis afflictisque decrying the severe persecution of the faithful in Mexico and the deprivation of the rights of the faithful and the Church.

The formal rebellion began on January 1, 1927, with the "Cristeros" battle cry ¡Viva Cristo Rey! ("Long live Christ the King!"). When Jalisco federal commander General Jesús Maria Ferreira moved on the rebels, he calmly stated that "it will be less a campaign than a hunt." Just as the Cristeros began to hold their own against the federal forces, the rebellion was ended by diplomatic means, in large part due to the pressure of United States Ambassador Dwight Whitney Morrow. The war had claimed the lives of some 90,000: 56,882 on the federal side, 30,000 Cristeros. Numerous civilians and Cristeros were killed in anticlerical raids, while Cristeros killed atheist teachers and people suspected of supporting the government, and also blew up a passenger train.

On September 29, 1932, Pope Pius XI issued a second encyclical on the persecution, Acerba Animi. The effects of the war on the Church were profound. Between 1926 and 1934 at least 40 priests were killed. Where there were 4,500 priests serving the people before the rebellion, in 1934 there were only 334 priests licensed by the government to serve fifteen million people, the rest having been eliminated by emigration, expulsion and assassination. By 1935, 17 states had no priest at all.

The persecution was worst under the rule of Tabasco's governor Tomás Garrido Canabal. His rule, which marked the apogee of Mexican anti-clericalism, was supported by his Radical Socialist Party of Tabasco (PRST). In 1916, his predecessor Francisco J. Múgica had restored the name of the state capital Villa Hermosa de San Juan Bautista ("Beautiful Town of St. John the Baptist") to Villahermosa ("Beautifultown"). Garrido Canabal founded several communist paramilitary organizations "that terrorized Roman Catholics", most notably the so-called "Red Shirts". It is Canabal’s persecution in Tabasco, that forms the setting of Graham Greene’s famous 1940 novel, The Power and the Glory. In it, a priest, who considers himself unworthy of his calling, is torn between seeking to escape to the relative safety of a neighbouring state and continuing to minister in secret and in fear to the people in his care. The priest and the states, along with the governor, remain nameless.

The Catholic Church has recognized several of those killed in connection with the Cristero rebellion as martyrs. Perhaps the best-known is Miguel Pro, SJ. This Jesuit priest was shot dead by firing squad on November 23, 1927, without benefit of a trial, on trumped-up charges. The Calles government hoped to use images of the execution to scare the rebels into surrender, but the photos had the opposite effect. Upon seeing the photos, which the government had printed in all the newspapers, the Cristeros were inspired with a desire to follow Father Pro into martyrdom for Christ. His beatification occurred in 1988. On May 21, 2000, Pope John Paul II canonized a group of 25 martyrs from this period (they were previously beatified on November 22, 1992.) For the most part, these were priests who did not take up arms, but refused to leave their flocks, and were killed by federal forces. Thirteen additional victims of the anti-Catholic regime have been declared martyrs by the Catholic Church, paving the way to their beatification. These are primarily lay people, including the 14-year-old José Sánchez del Río. The requirement that they did not take up arms, which was applied to the priest martyrs, does not apply to the lay people, though it had to be shown that they were taking up arms in self-defense.

== Mid-twentieth century ==
As Mexico entered the mid-twentieth century, the more violent oppression of earlier in the century had waned but the Church remained severely suppressed. By 1940, it "legally had no corporate existence, no real estate, no schools, no monasteries or convents, no foreign priests, no right to defend itself publicly or in the courts. ...Its clergy were forbidden to wear clerical garb, to vote, to celebrate public religious ceremonies, and to engage in politics," but the restrictions were not always enforced.

Open hostility toward the Church largely ceased with the election of Manuel Ávila Camacho (1940–46), who agreed, in exchange for the Church's efforts to maintain peace, to non-enforcement of most of the anticlerical provisions, an exception being Article 130, Section 9, which deprived the Church of the right of political speech, the right to vote, and the right of free political association.

== Removal of many anticlerical provisions from the constitution ==
In 1991, President Salinas proposed the removal of most of the anticlerical provisions from the constitution, a move which passed the legislature in 1992.

== Martyrs ==
- Saints of the Cristero War
- José Sánchez del Río
- Mateo Correa Magallanes
- Miguel Pro
- Anacleto González Flores

== See also ==
- The Power and the Glory
