= Statolatry =

Worship of the state

Statolatry is a term formed from the word "state" and a suffix derived from the Latin and Greek word latria, meaning "worship". It first appeared in Giovanni Gentile's Doctrine of Fascism, published in 1931 under Mussolini's name, and was also mentioned in Gramsci's Prison Notebooks (1971) sometime between 1931 and 1932, while he was imprisoned by Mussolini. The same year, the encyclical Non abbiamo bisogno by Pope Pius XI criticized Fascist Italy as developing "a pagan worship of the state" which it called "statolatry".

The term politiolatry was used to describe reason of state doctrine in the 17th century with similar intent.

== Ludwig von Mises' Omnipotent Government (1944) ==
The term was also used and popularized by Ludwig von Mises in his 1944 work Omnipotent Government. Mises defines statolatry as being literally worship of the State analogous to idolatry (worship of idols). Statolatry asserts that the glorification and aggrandizement of 'State' or 'Nation' is the object of all legitimate human aspiration at the expense of all else, including personal welfare and independent thought. Expansion of the power and influence of one's State is to be achieved, if necessary, through aggressive war and colonial adventures (i.e. imperialism). It far exceeds the patriotism of those who recognize the rights of people other than themselves to self-determination, and might best be described as super-patriotism or chauvinism.

== See also ==
- The Beast (Revelation)
- Christian anarchism
- Christian libertarianism
- Civil religion
- Fascism
- Imperial cult
- Jingoism
- Kingship and kingdom of God
- Leviathan (Hobbes book)
- Mandate of Heaven
- No gods, no masters
- Political religion
- Render unto Caesar
- Rule according to higher law
- Secular religion
- Statism (State nationalism)
- Totalitarianism
- We, a science-fiction novel by Yevgeny Zamyatin with a state cult
