= Iniquis afflictisque =

1926 papal encyclical by Pius XI

Iniquis afflictisque Encyclical of Pope Pius XI
- Signature date: 18 November 1926
- Subject: On the Persecution of the Church in Mexico
- Text: In English

Iniquis afflictisque (On the Persecution of the Church in Mexico) is an encyclical of Pope Pius XI promulgated on November 18, 1926, to denounce the persecution of the Catholic Church in Mexico. It was one of three encyclicals concerning Mexico, including Acerba animi (1932) and Firmissimam Constantiamque (1937). The Mexican government at the time was engaging in violently anticlerical persecution of the Church and the Pope harshly criticised the government for its abuses.

The Pope criticized the state's interference in matters of worship, outlawing of religious orders and the expropriation of Church property. He noted that, "Priests are... deprived of all civil and political rights. They are thus placed in the same class with criminals and the insane."

== See also ==
- Cristero War
