= Divini illius Magistri =

1930 papal encyclical by Pius XI

Divini illius Magistri Latin for 'of that divine Teacher' Encyclical of Pope Pius XI
- Signature date: 31 December 1929
- Subject: On Christian education
- Number: 15 of 31 of the pontificate
- Text: In Latin; In English

Divini illius Magistri (lit. 'Of that divine Teacher') is an encyclical issued by Pope Pius XI in 1929 that concerns the education of Christian youth. Implicitly criticizing the educational policies of Fascist Italy, the document argues that the family and the Church have rights, over and above the state, to determine a child's course of education.

The document opposes coeducation at all ages of instruction, "particularly in the most delicate and decisive period of formation, that, namely, of adolescence". The prohibition of coeducation, which was also found in the 1917 Code of Canon Law, was lifted in the 1983 Code of Canon Law.

== See also ==
- Ex corde Ecclesiae
- Gravissimum educationis
