= Acerba animi =

1932 encyclical on persecution of Catholics in Mexico

Acerba animi (Latin, "Of harsh souls"; also called On the Persecution of the Church in Mexico) is an encyclical of Pope Pius XI promulgated on 29 September 1932, to denounce the continued persecution of the Catholic Church in Mexico. It was the second of three encyclicals concerning persecution in Mexico, including Iniquis afflictisque (1926) and Firmissimam constantiamque (1937). The Mexican government at the time was engaging in violently anticlerical persecution of the Church, and the Pope harshly criticised the government for its past and current abuse of the Church and its faithful and chided the government for not only violating its promises to the Church made in the recent cessation of the Catholic uprising, the Cristero War, but expanding the persecution.

== Substance of the Encyclical ==
Pius XI

The Pope criticized the state's continued persecution noting that the Mexican people had been "so long harassed by grievous persecutions". The Pope stated that the anticlerical articles of the Mexican constitution were "seriously derogatory to the most elementary and inalienable rights of the Church and of the faithful" and that both he and his predecessor had endeavored to avoid their application by the Mexican government. The Pope chided the Mexican government for breaking its promise not to apply the anticlerical provisions, just shortly after making those promises in writing to the Holy See.

The letter noted the recent history of Mexico where a "rigorous application was given to Article 130 of the Constitution" which due to its "extreme hostility to the Church as may be seen from Our Encyclical Iniquis afflictisque" caused the Holy See to protest, leading to "[h]eavy penalties" for those who did not comply with the "deplorable article". The Pope recalls that the government of Plutarco Calles then enacted a law which allowed the states to regulate the number of priests in their territory. The "despotism" of the "Government hostile to the Catholic" and its "intolerant" acts led the Bishops of Mexico to suspend public worship, after which they were nearly all banished to watch from abroad the martyrdom of their priests and flock. The persecution led to the rebellion known as the Cristero War.

The letter allows that the See "did not forbear to encourage with word and counsel the lawful Christian resistance of the priests and the faithful"

The Pope noted that the government's indications that it was not averse to coming to an agreement gave some hope, even though the same government had a recent history of breaking its promises. Thus when the government indicated in 1929 that it did not by application of the anticlerical provisions of the constitution intend to destroy what the government called the "identity of the Church" nor to ignore its hierarchy, the Holy See agreed to relent, allowing the resuming of public worship, with the understanding that the Church would not accept the government regulation of worship, nor cease protest against, nor to combat it. Nonetheless, the government again broke its promises as "faithful Catholics continued to be penalized and imprisoned", exiled Bishops were not allowed to return and more were exiled "without any semblance of legality". In violation of promises, in many diocese, seized property, including churches, seminaries, Bishops' residences were not returned and "priests and laymen who had steadfastly defended the faith were abandoned to the cruel vengeance of their adversaries".

The government continued to spur antireligious, socialist and masonic education in the schools and to gradually eliminate priests in the country by severely regulating their numbers, noting that Michoacán had only one priest for every 33,000 faithful, Chiapas one for every 60,000, and Vera Cruz only one for every 100,000. The government continued to close seminaries and exhibit an intention to destroy the Church. The persecution differed little for that going on in the U.S.S.R. at the time.

The Pope stated that "any restriction whatever of the number of priests is a grave violation of divine rights", urging the "Bishops, the clergy, and the Catholic laity to continue to protest with all their energy against such violation, using every legitimate means.". (Paragraph 20 makes it clear that "legitimate means" did not include renewed rebellion.) As a remedy the letter especially urged that "the priests with their proved spirit of abnegation render ever more intense their sacred ministry, particularly among the young and the common people, striving to carry on a work of persuasion and of charity especially among the enemies of the Church, who combat her because they do not know her." It also urged "instituting and furthering to an ever greater extent Catholic Action", "recourse to the Sacraments, sources of grace and strength, and instruction in the truth of the faith. Rejecting further rebellion, the letter counseled laymen to "the closest union with the Church and the Hierarchy, manifesting it by their docility to her teachings and directions".

== Reception and ramifications ==
The reaction of the government was hostile; the President at the time, Abelardo Rodriguez, called the encyclical "insolent and defiant." Some rebellious faithful did not heed the encyclical either, renewing hostilities with guerrilla action, deviating from the lack of rebellion from 1929 to 1931. On the other hand, substantial efforts were made to comply, in the least overtly political way possible, the goals of Acción Católica Mexicana (Mexican Catholic Action – ACM):

1. To again place Jesus Christ in the middle of the family school and society
2. To combat by all just and legal means anti-Christian civilization.
3. To repair by the same means the grave disorders in our society.
4. To reestablish the principle that human authority is representative of that of God.

Still, during most of the Maximato membership was not high and action was limited.
