= Syllabus against racism =

1938 Vatican document

The syllabus against racism is the name given to a Vatican document written in 1938, designed to promote the condemnation of racism and Nazi ideology in Catholic educational institutions.

In April 1938, the Sacred Congregation for seminaries and universities developed at the request of Pius XI a syllabus condemning racist theories to be sent to Catholic schools worldwide.
