= Non abbiamo bisogno =

Papal encyclical about fascism, published in 1931

Non abbiamo bisogno Italian for 'We do not need' Encyclical of Pope Pius XI
- Signature date: 29 June 1931
- Subject: On Catholic action in Italy
- Number: 20 of 31 of the pontificate
- Original language: Italian
- Text: In original language; In English
- AAS: 23 (8): 285–312

Non abbiamo bisogno (Italian for "We do not need") is a Roman Catholic encyclical published on 29 June 1931 by Pope Pius XI.

== Context ==
The encyclical condemned what it perceived as Italian fascism's "pagan worship of the State" (statolatry) and "revolution which snatches the young from the Church and from Jesus Christ, and which inculcates in its own young people hatred, violence and irreverence."

The encyclical begins with the Pope's protest against Mussolini's closing of Italian Catholic Action and Catholic Youth organizations in that same year. Pius XI made protests not just about the closing of these Catholic associations, but also against false and defamatory reports ordered to be published in the Italian press by Mussolini. Pius also wrote that Mussolini's regime was anti-Catholic.

Cardinal Tarcisio Bertone, Cardinal Secretary of State under Popes Benedict XVI and Francis, asserts that the encyclical was "strongly polemic" against Mussolini who ordered that Catholic youth associations be dissolved.

The encyclical states, presumably meaning Mussolini, that:

55. Therefore We must say, and do hereby say, that he is a Catholic only in name and by baptism (in contradiction to the obligations of that name and to the baptismal promises) who adopts and develops a programme with doctrines and maxims so opposed to the rights of the Church of Jesus Christ and of souls, and who also misrepresents, combats and persecutes Catholic Action which, as is universally known, the Church and its Head regard as very dear and precious.

Regarding the National Fascist Party, the encyclical states that:

62. In everything that We have said up to the present, We have not said that We wished to condemn the [Fascist] party as such. Our aim has been to point out and to condemn all those things in the programme and in the activities of the party which have been found to be contrary to Catholic doctrine and Catholic practice, and therefore irreconcilable with the Catholic name and profession.

== Resolution ==
On September 2, 1931, Mussolini and the Pope reached an agreement. Essentially, Catholic Action groups were prohibited from critizing the regime and in return they would be allowed to operate with full freedom, aside from involving themselves in politics.

Due to Mussolini's efforts to stabilize the relationship of the Fascist regime and the Catholic Church, the Pope awarded him with the Order of the Golden Spur. It is an incredibly rare, single-class order of knighthood reserved for those who had rendered significant service to the Catholic Church. At the time Mussolini received it, only nine other living people possessed it.

The award, therefore, marked an end to the ideological conflict between Fascist Italy and the Catholic Church, who were now on good and stable terms.

== See also ==
- Mit brennender Sorge, another encyclical written by Pope Pius XI in the vernacular, this time concerning Nazi Germany
