= Pope Pius XI =

Head of the Catholic Church from 1922 to 1939

- Bishop of Rome
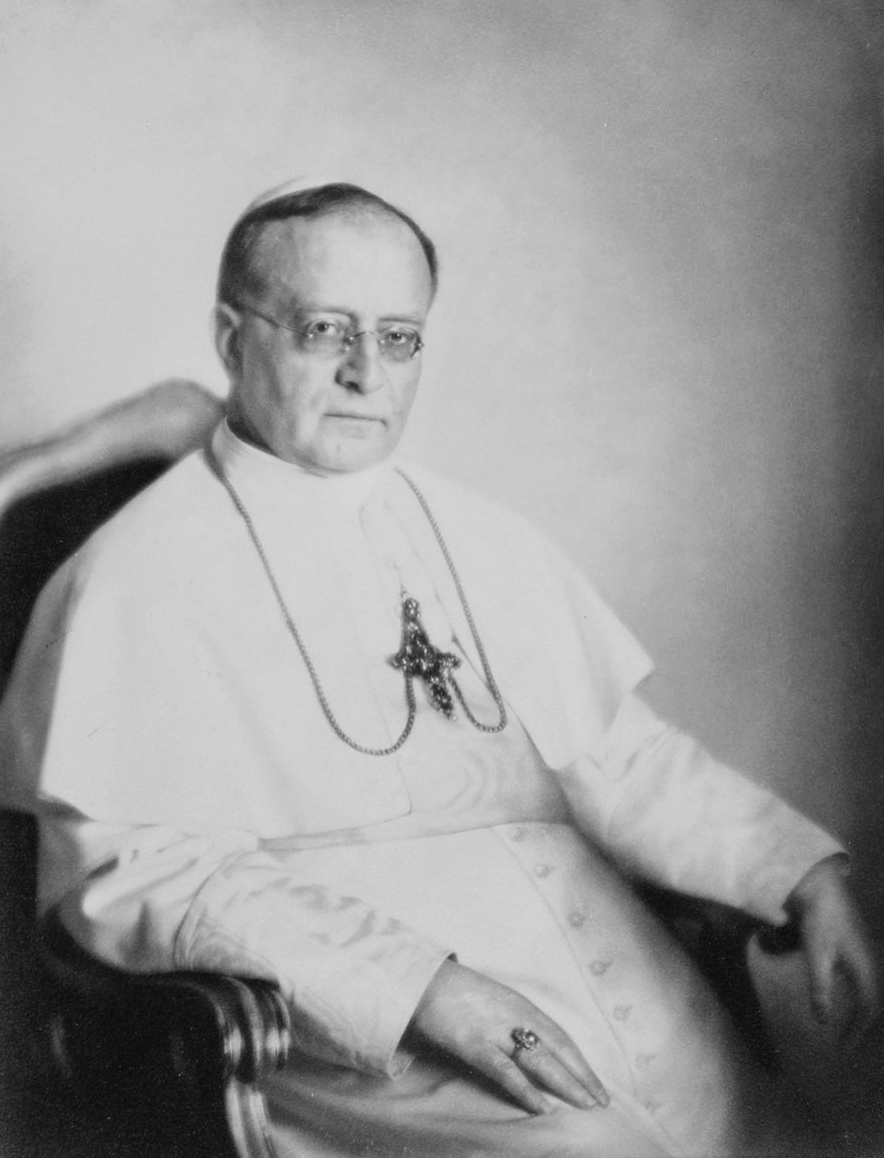
- Photograph by Nicola Perscheid, c. 1922
- Church: Catholic Church
- Papacy began: 6 February 1922
- Papacy ended: 10 February 1939
- Predecessor: Benedict XV
- Successor: Pius XII
- Previous post: Chief of the Ambrosian Library (1907‍–‍1914); Vice-Prefect of the Vatican Library (1914‍–‍1915); Prefect of the Vatican Library (1915‍–‍1919); Titular Archbishop of Naupactus (1919‍–‍1921); Apostolic Nuncio to Poland (1919‍–‍1921); Titular Archbishop of Adana (April‍–‍June 1921); Archbishop of Milan (1921‍–‍1922); Cardinal Priest of Santi Silvestro e Martino ai Monti (1921‍–‍1922)

Orders
- Ordination: 20 December 1879 by Raffaele Monaco La Valletta
- Consecration: 28 October 1919 by Aleksander Kakowski
- Created cardinal: 13 June 1921 by Benedict XV
- Rank: Cardinal priest

Personal details
- Born: Ambrogio Damiano Achille Ratti; 31 May 1857 Desio, Lombardy–Venetia, Austrian Empire
- Died: 10 February 1939 (aged 81) Apostolic Palace, Vatican City
- Education: Pontifical Gregorian University (ThD, JCD, PhD)
- Motto: Pax Christi in Regno Christi (Latin for 'The Peace of Christ in the Kingdom of Christ'); Raptim transit (Latin for 'It goes by swiftly')
- Signature: Pius XI's signature

- Coat of arms: Pius XI's coat of arms

Ordination history
History
Priestly ordination
- Ordained by: Raffaele Monaco La Valletta
- Date: 20 December 1879
Episcopal consecration
- Principal consecrator: Aleksander Kakowski
- Co-consecrators: Józef Sebastian Pelczar; Stanisław Kazimierz Zdzitowiecki
- Date: 28 October 1919
Cardinalate
- Elevated by: Pope Benedict XV
- Date: 13 June 1921
Episcopal succession
Bishops consecrated by Pope Pius XI as principal consecrator
- Oreste Giorgi: 27 April 1924
- Michele Lega: 11 July 1926
- Alfredo Ildefonso Schuster: 21 July 1929

Pope Pius XI (Italian: Pio XI; born Ambrogio Damiano Achille Ratti, Italian: [amˈbrɔːdʒo daˈmjaːno aˈkille ˈratti]; 31 May 1857 – 10 February 1939) was head of the Catholic Church from 6 February 1922 until his death in February 1939. He was also the first sovereign of Vatican City upon its creation on 11 February 1929.

Pius XI issued numerous encyclicals, including Quadragesimo anno on the 40th anniversary of Pope Leo XIII's groundbreaking social encyclical Rerum Novarum Semel, highlighting the capitalistic greed of international finance, the dangers of atheistic communism, and social justice issues. He also wrote Quas Primas Post, establishing the feast of Christ the King in response to anti-clericalism. The encyclical Casti Connubii Quanta promulgated on 31 December 1930 prohibited Catholics from using contraception.

To establish or maintain the position of the Catholic Church, Pius XI concluded a record number of concordats, including the Reichskonkordat with Nazi Germany, and he condemned their betrayals four years later in the encyclical Mit brennender Sorge. During his pontificate, the longstanding hostility with the Italian government over the status of the papacy and the Church in Italy was successfully resolved in the Lateran Treaty of 1929.

He canonized Thomas More, Peter Canisius, Bernadette of Lourdes, and Don Bosco. He beatified and canonized Thérèse de Lisieux, for whom he held special reverence, and gave equivalent canonization to Albertus Magnus, naming him a Doctor of the Church. He took a strong interest in fostering the participation of laypeople throughout the Church, especially in the Catholic Action movement. The end of his pontificate was dominated by his speaking out against Adolf Hitler and Benito Mussolini, and defending the Catholic Church from outside interference. Pius XI died on 10 February 1939 in the Apostolic Palace and was buried in the Papal Grotto of Saint Peter's Basilica.

== Early life and career ==
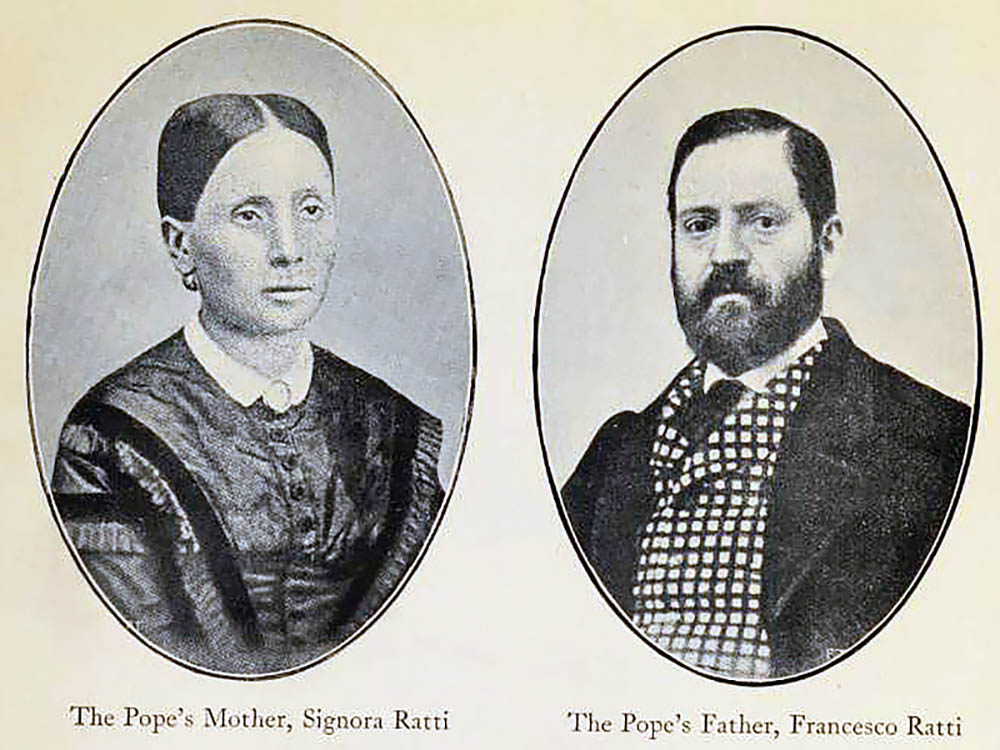
The parents of Pius XI

Ambrogio Damiano Achille Ratti was born in Desio, in the province of Milan, in 1857, the son of the owner of a silk factory. His parents were Francesco Antonio Ratti (1823–1881) and his wife Angela Teresa née Galli-Cova (1832–1918); his siblings were Carlo (1853–1906), Fermo (1854–1929), Edoardo (1855–1896), Camilla (1860–1946), and Cipriano. He was ordained a priest in 1879 and was selected for a life of academic studies within the Church. He obtained three doctorates (in philosophy, canon law, and theology) at the Gregorian University in Rome, and from 1882 to 1888 was a professor at a seminary in Padua. His scholarly speciality was as an expert paleographer, a student of ancient and medieval Church manuscripts. In 1888, he was transferred from seminary teaching to the Ambrosian Library in Milan, where he worked until 1911.

During this time, Ratti edited and published an edition of the Ambrosian Missal (the rite of Mass used in a wide territory in northern Italy, coinciding above all with the diocese of Milan). He also engaged in research and writing on the life and works of the reforming Archbishop of Milan, Charles Borromeo. Ratti became head of the Ambrosian Library in 1907 and undertook a thorough programme of restoration and reclassification of its collections.

Despite his job as a librarian, Ratti was physically active. During his entire time in Milan, he was an avid mountaineer, undertaking over twenty major tours between 1885 and 1913 and climbing, among others, Mont Blanc (the Italian normal route to Mont Blanc now bears his name), the Matterhorn, the Presolana and the Dufourspitze. He climbed the latter in July 1889 on the route via the eastern flank, which had been first climbed in 1872, an extremely challenging route, previously considered unclimbable, and he was part of the first Italian rope team to conquer the 4634 meter high mountain peak. They were also the first to make the traverse from Macugnaga to Zermatt by the Zumsteinjoch. After climbing the Dufourspitze, he spent the night on the summit with his companions. Ratti also wrote a significant number of mountaineering writings. A scholar-athlete pope was not seen again until John Paul II.

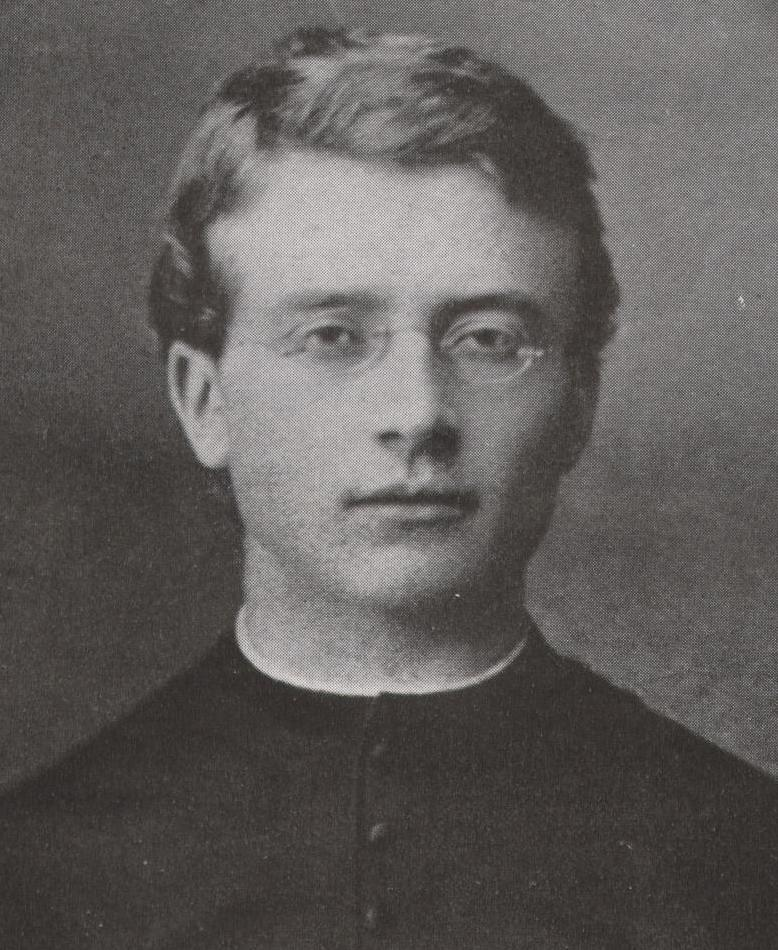
The young Ratti as a newly ordained priest.

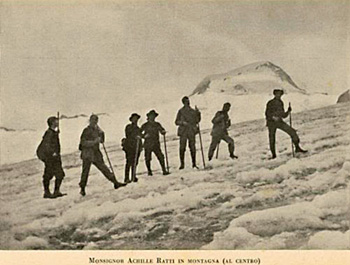
Ratti (centre) circa 1900 in the Alps on a tour.

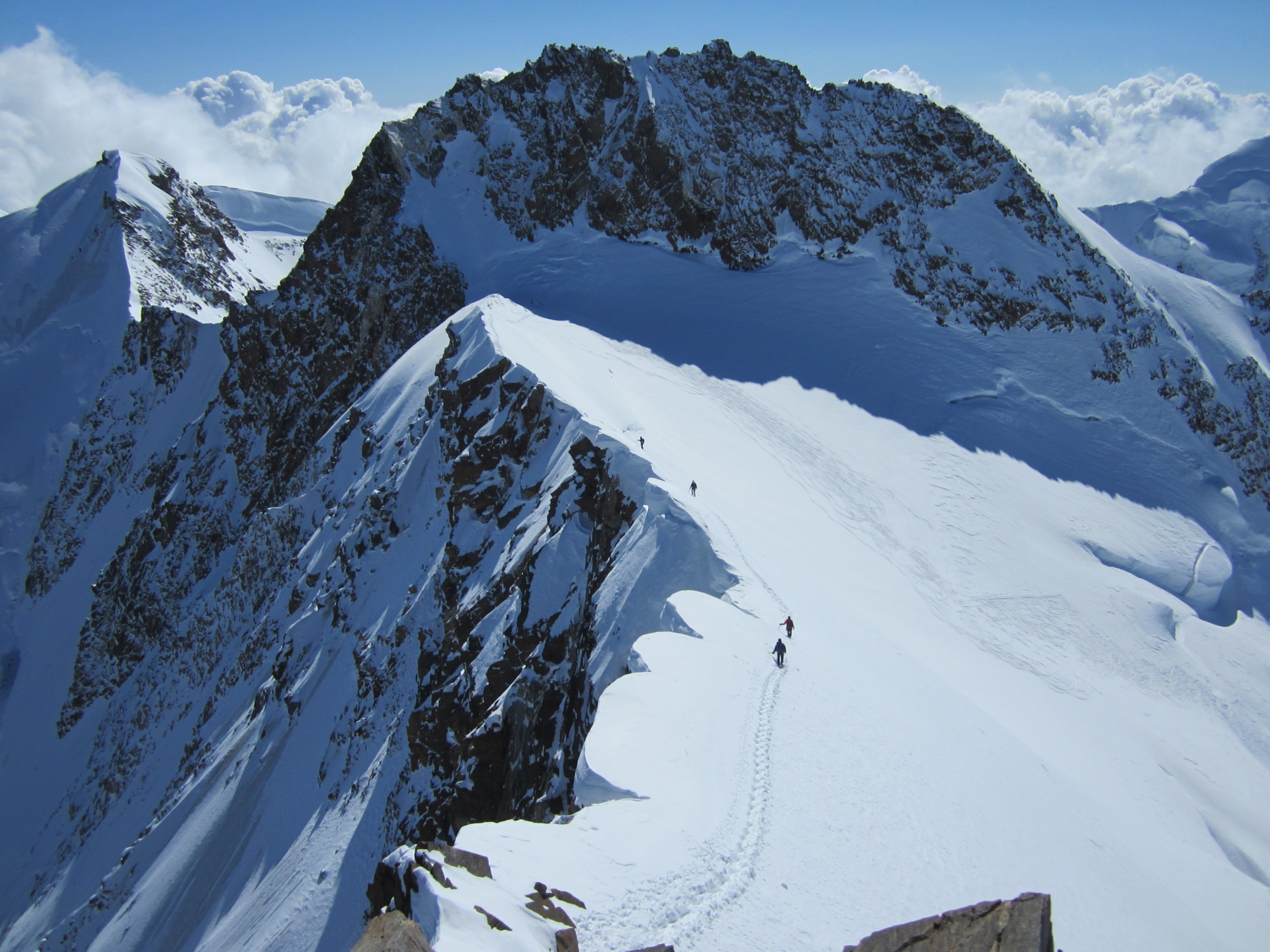
Dufourspitze (mountain massif in the middle), Zumsteinspitze (in the background left)

In 1911, Ratti was appointed by Pope Pius X Vice-Prefect of the Vatican Library, and in 1914 was promoted to Prefect.

=== Nuncio to Poland and expulsion ===
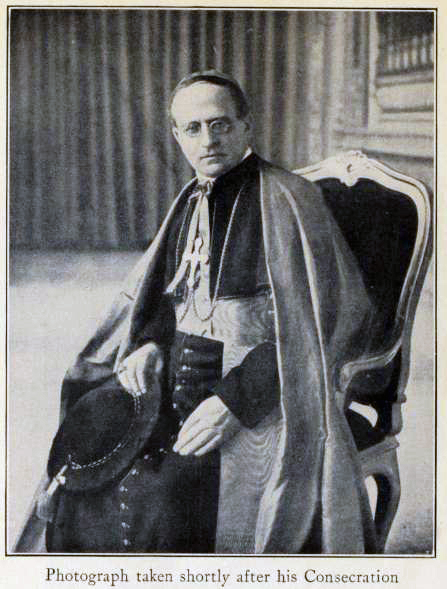
Ratti, shortly after his consecration as bishop

In 1918, Pope Benedict XV (1914–1922) appointed Ratti to what was in effect a diplomatic post, as apostolic visitor (an unofficial papal representative) in Poland. In the aftermath of World War I, a Polish state was restored, though the process was in practice incomplete, since the territory was still under the effective control of Germany and Austria-Hungary. In October 1918, Benedict was the first head of state to congratulate the Polish people on the occasion of the restoration of their independence. In March 1919, he appointed ten new bishops and on 6 June 1919 reappointed Ratti, this time to the rank of papal nuncio and on 3 July appointed him a titular archbishop. Ratti was consecrated as a bishop on 28 October 1919. According to German theologian Joseph Schmidlin's Papstgeschichte der Neuesten Zeit, Benedict and Ratti repeatedly cautioned Polish authorities against persecuting Lithuanian and Ruthenian clergy. During the Bolshevik advance against Warsaw during the Polish-Soviet War, Benedict asked for worldwide public prayers for Poland, while Ratti was the only foreign diplomat who refused to flee Warsaw when the Red Army was approaching the city in August 1920. On 11 June 1921, Benedict asked Ratti to deliver his message to the Polish episcopate, warning against political misuses of spiritual power, urging peaceful coexistence with neighboring peoples, and saying that "love of country has its limits in justice and obligations".

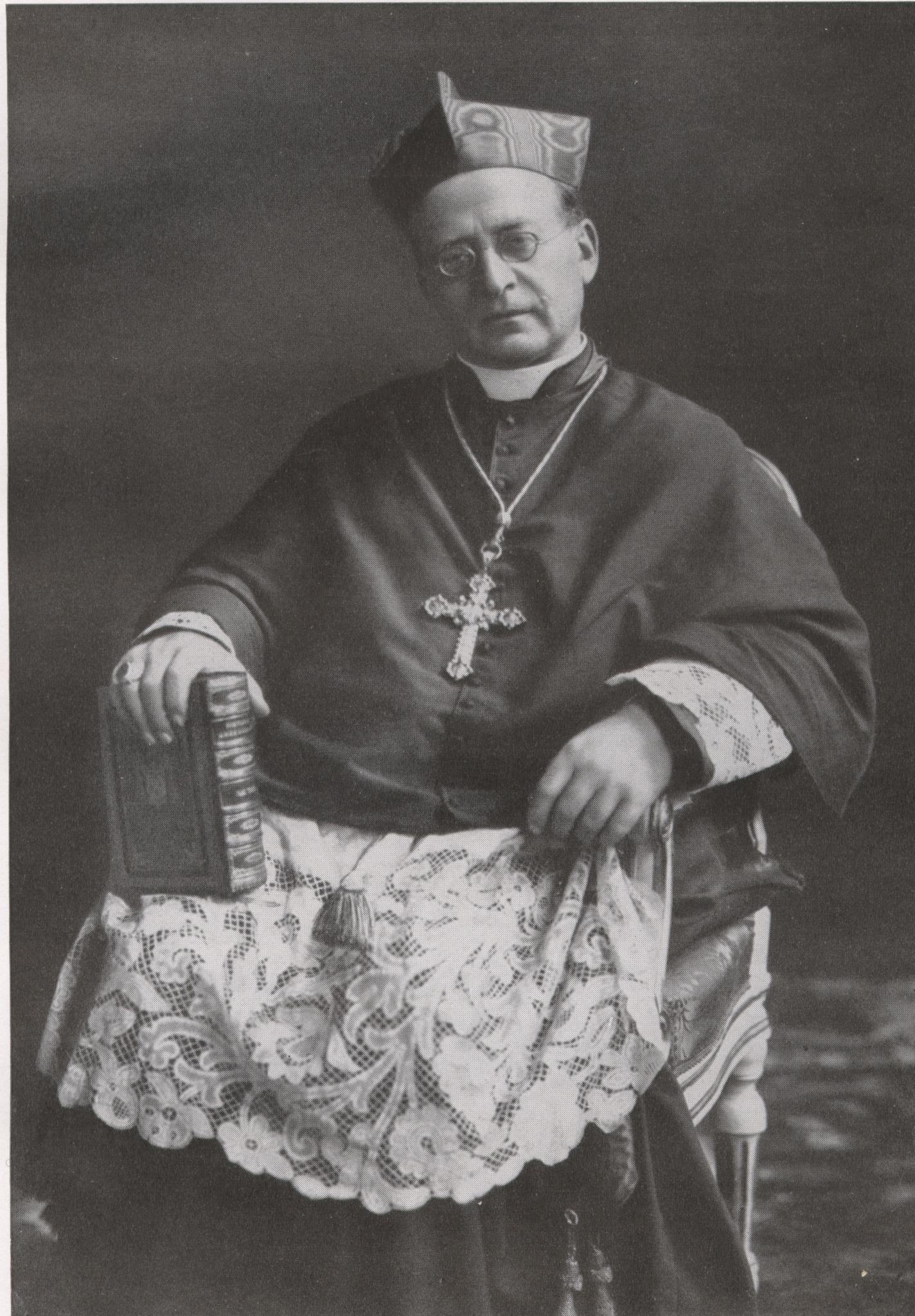
Cardinal Achille Ratti in 1921

Ratti intended to work for Poland by building bridges to men of goodwill in the Soviet Union, even to shedding his blood for Russia. But Benedict needed Ratti as a diplomat, not a martyr, and forbade his traveling to the USSR despite his being the official papal delegate for Russia. The nuncio's continued contacts with Russians did not generate much sympathy for him within Poland at the time. After Benedict sent Ratti to Silesia to forestall potential political agitation within the Polish Catholic clergy, Ratti was asked to leave Poland. On 20 November, when German Cardinal Adolf Bertram announced a papal ban on all political activities of clergymen, calls for Ratti's expulsion climaxed. "While he tried honestly to show himself as a friend of Poland, Warsaw forced his departure, after his neutrality in Silesian voting was questioned" by Germans and Poles. Nationalistic Germans objected to the Polish nuncio supervising local elections, and patriotic Poles were upset because he curtailed political action among the clergy.

=== Elevation to the papacy ===
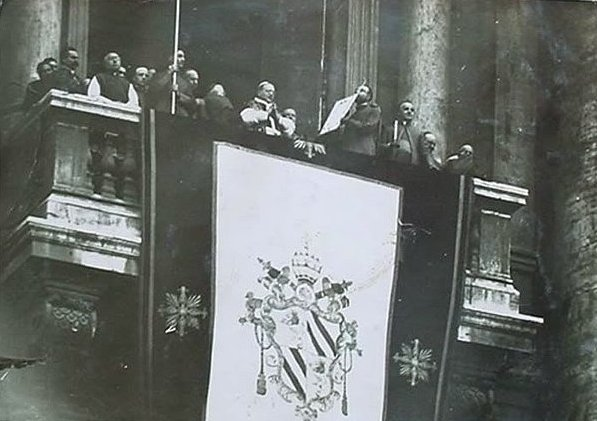
Pius XI makes his first public appearance as pope in 1922. The coat of arms on the banner is that of Pope Pius IX.

In the consistory of 3 June 1921, Benedict XV created three new cardinals, including Ratti as Cardinal-Priest of Santi Silvestro e Martino ai Monti, who was appointed Archbishop of Milan simultaneously. Benedict told them, "Well, today I gave you the red hat, but soon it will be white for one of you." After the Vatican celebration, Ratti went to the Benedictine monastery at Monte Cassino for a retreat to prepare spiritually for his new role. He accompanied Milanese pilgrims to Lourdes in August 1921. Ratti received a tumultuous welcome on a visit to his home town of Desio, and was enthroned in Milan on 8 September. On 22 January 1922, Benedict XV died unexpectedly of pneumonia.

At the conclave to choose a new pope, the longest of the 20th century, the College of Cardinals was divided into two factions, one led by Rafael Merry del Val favouring the policies and style of Pius X and the other favouring those of Benedict XV led by Pietro Gasparri.

Gasparri approached Ratti before voting began on the third day and told him he would urge his supporters to switch their votes to Ratti, who was shocked to hear this. When it became clear that neither Gasparri nor del Val could win, the cardinals approached Ratti, thinking him a compromise candidate not identified with either faction. Cardinal Gaetano de Lai approached Ratti and was believed to have said: "We will vote for Your Eminence if Your Eminence will promise that you will not choose Cardinal Gasparri as your secretary of state". Ratti is said to have responded: "I hope and pray that among so highly deserving cardinals the Holy Spirit selects someone else. If I am chosen, it is indeed Cardinal Gasparri whom I will take to be my secretary of state".

Ratti was elected on the conclave's 14th ballot on 6 February 1922 and took the name Pius XI, explaining that Pius IX was the pope of his youth and Pius X had appointed him head of the Vatican Library. It was rumored that immediately after the election, he decided to appoint Pietro Gasparri as his Cardinal Secretary of State. When asked if he accepted his election, Ratti was said to have replied: "In spite of my unworthiness, of which I am deeply aware, I accept". He went on to say that his choice in papal name was because "Pius is a name of peace".

After the dean Cardinal Vincenzo Vannutelli asked if he assented to the election, Ratti paused in silence for two minutes, according to Cardinal Désiré-Joseph Mercier. The Hungarian cardinal János Csernoch later commented: "We made Cardinal Ratti pass through the fourteen stations of the Via Crucis and then we left him alone on Calvary".

As Pius XI's first act as pope, he revived the traditional public blessing from the balcony, Urbi et Orbi ("to the city and to the world"), abandoned by his predecessors since the loss of Rome to the Italian state in 1870. This suggested his openness to a rapprochement with the government of Italy. Less than a month later, considering that all four cardinals from the Americas had been unable to participate in his election, he issued Cum proxime to allow the College of Cardinals to delay the start of a conclave for as long as 18 days following the death of a pope.

== Public teaching ==
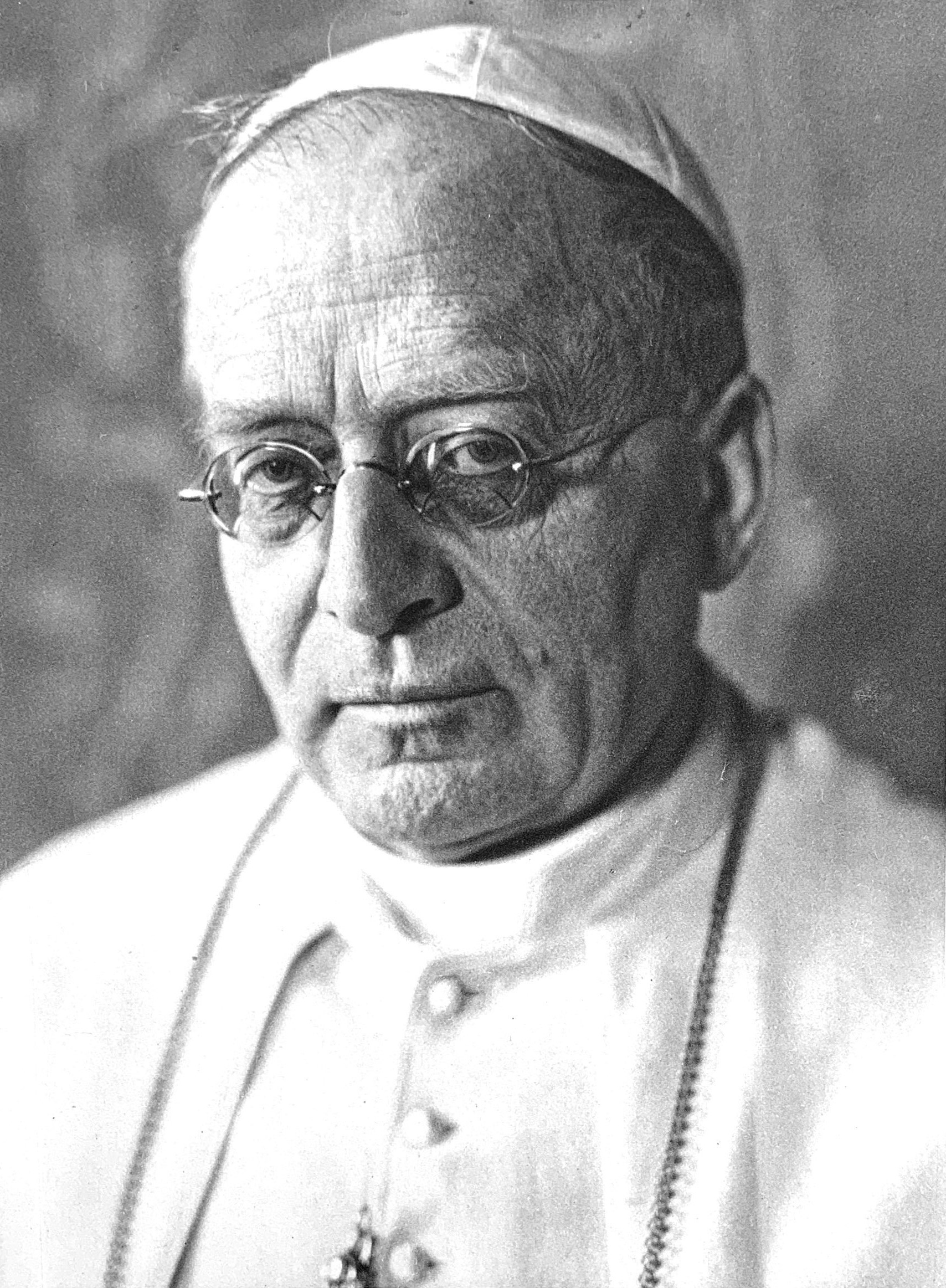
Pius XI in 1930

=== Early encyclical letters ===
Pius XI's first encyclical letter was directly related to his aim of Christianizing all aspects of increasingly secular societies. Ubi arcano, promulgated in December 1922, inaugurated the "Catholic Action" movement.

Similar goals were in evidence in two encyclicals of 1929 and 1930:

- Divini illius Magistri ("Of that divine Teacher") (1929) made clear the need for Christian influence over secular education. Divini illius magistri laid foundations built on by Pope Pius XII and emphasised in the Second Vatican Council's Declaration on Christian Education (1965). (Note: There are 13 footnote references to Divini illius magistri in the Declaration on Christian Education (Gravissimum educationis).)
- Casti connubii ("Chaste wedlock") (1930) praised Christian marriage and family life as the basis for any good society; it condemned artificial means of contraception, but acknowledged the unitive aspect of intercourse:
  - ...[A]ny use whatsoever of matrimony exercised in such a way that the act is deliberately frustrated in its natural power to generate life is an offense against the law of God and of nature, and those who indulge in such are branded with the guilt of a grave sin.
  - ....Nor are those considered as acting against nature who in the married state use their right in the proper manner although on account of natural reasons either of time or of certain defects, new life cannot be brought forth. For in matrimony as well as in the use of the matrimonial rights there are also secondary ends, such as mutual aid, the cultivating of mutual love, and the quieting of concupiscence which husband and wife are not forbidden to consider so long as they are subordinated to the primary end and so long as the intrinsic nature of the act is preserved.

=== Political teachings ===
Pius XI took a pragmatic approach toward different forms of government. In his encyclical Dilectissima Nobis (1933), in which he addressed the situation of the Church in Republican Spain, he proclaimed,

Universally known is the fact that the Catholic Church is never bound to one form of government more than to another, provided the Divine rights of God and of Christian consciences are safe. She does not find any difficulty in adapting herself to various civil institutions, be they monarchic or republican, aristocratic or democratic.

=== Social teachings ===
Pius XI argued for a reconstruction of economic and political life on the basis of religious values. Quadragesimo anno (1931) was written to mark 'forty years' since Pope Leo XIII's (1878–1903) encyclical Rerum novarum, and restated that encyclical's warnings against both socialism and unrestrained capitalism, as enemies to human freedom and dignity. Pius XI instead envisioned an economy based on cooperation and solidarity.

In Quadragesimo anno, Pius XI wrote that social and economic issues are vital to the Church not from a technical point of view but morally and ethically. Ethical considerations include the nature of private property in terms of its functions for society and the development of the individual. He defined fair wages and called international capitalism materially and spiritually exploitative.

==== Gender roles ====
Pius XI wrote that mothers should work primarily within the home, or in its immediate vicinity, and concentrate on household duties. He argued that every effort in society must be made for fathers to make high enough wages that it never becomes necessary for mothers to work. Forced dual-income situations in which mothers work he called an "intolerable abuse". Pius also criticized egalitarianist stances, describing modern attempts to "liberate women" as a "crime". He wrote that attempts to liberate women from their husbands are a "false liberty and unnatural equality" and that the true emancipation of women "belongs to the noble office of a Christian woman and wife."

==== Private property ====
The Church has a role in discussing the issues related to the social order. Social and economic issues are vital to it not from a technical point of view but morally and ethically. Ethical considerations include the nature of private property. Within the Catholic Church, several conflicting views had developed. Pius declared private property essential for individual development and freedom, and said that those who deny private property also deny personal freedom and development. He also said that private property has a social function and loses its morality if it is not subordinated to the common good, and governments have a right to redistribution policies. In extreme cases, he granted the state a right to expropriate private property.

==== Capital and labor ====
A related issue, said Pius, is the relation between capital and labor and the determination of fair wages. Pius develops the following ethical mandate: The Church considers it a perversion of industrial society to have developed sharp opposite camps based on income. He welcomes all attempts to alleviate these differences. Three elements determine a fair wage: the worker's family, the economic condition of the enterprise, and the economy as a whole. The family has an innate right to development, but this is possible only within the framework of a functioning economy and a sound enterprise. Thus, Pius concludes that cooperation and not conflict is a necessary condition, given the interdependence of the parties involved.

==== Social order ====
Pius XI believed that industrialization results in less freedom at the individual and communal level because numerous free social entities get absorbed by larger ones. The society of individuals becomes the mass class-society. People are much more interdependent than in ancient times, and become egoistic or class-conscious in order to save some freedom for themselves. The pope demands more solidarity, especially between employers and employees, through new forms of cooperation and communication. Pius displays an unfavorable view of capitalism, especially anonymous international finance markets. He identifies certain dangers for small and medium-size enterprises that have insufficient access to capital markets and are squeezed or destroyed by larger ones. He warns that capitalist interests can become a danger for nations, which could be reduced to "chained slaves of individual interests".

Pius XI was the first Pope to use the power of modern communications technology in evangelizing the wider world. He established Vatican Radio in 1931, and was the first Pope to broadcast on radio.

== Internal Church affairs and ecumenism ==
In his management of the Church's internal affairs, Pius XI mostly continued the policies of his predecessor. Like Benedict XV, he emphasized spreading Catholicism in Africa and Asia and training native clergy in those territories. He ordered every religious order to devote some of its personnel and resources to missionary work.

Pius XI continued the approach of Benedict XV on the issue of how to deal with the threat of modernism in Catholic theology. He was thoroughly orthodox theologically and had no sympathy with modernist ideas that relativized fundamental Catholic teachings. He condemned modernism in his writings and addresses. But his opposition to modernist theology was by no means a rejection of new scholarship within the Church, as long as it was developed within the framework of orthodoxy and compatible with the Church's teachings. Pius XI was interested in supporting serious scientific study within the Church, establishing the Pontifical Academy of the Sciences in 1936. In 1928 he formed the Gregorian Consortium of universities in Rome administered by the Society of Jesus, fostering closer collaboration between their Gregorian University, Biblical Institute, and Oriental Institute.

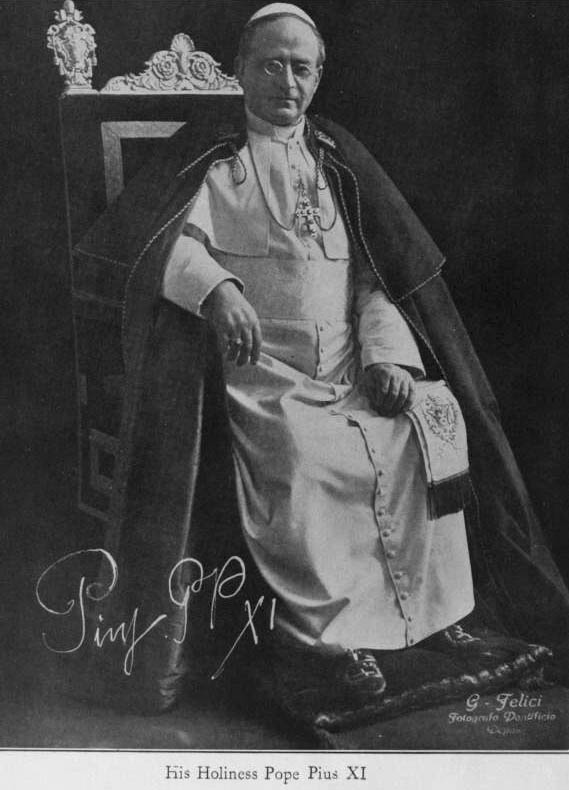
Pope Pius XI (1922–1939). Warsaw forced his departure as Nuncio. Two years later, he was pope. He signed concordats with numerous countries, including Lithuania and Poland.

Pius XI strongly encouraged devotion to the Sacred Heart in his encyclical Miserentissimus Redemptor (1928).

Pius XI was the first pope to directly address the Christian ecumenical movement. Like Benedict XV he was interested in achieving reunion with the Eastern Orthodox (failing that, he determined to give special attention to the Eastern Catholic churches). After the Greco-Turkish War, Pius XI also intervened on behalf of Orthodox Christians. In 1923 it sought the release of Kyrillos, Metropolitan of Rodopolis, who had been imprisoned in Trebizond. After his release, Patriarch Meletius IV and the Orthodox metropolitans thanked the Apostolic Delegation for its intervention.

Pius also allowed the dialogue between Catholics and Anglicans that had been planned during Benedict XV's pontificate to take place at Mechelen, but these enterprises were firmly aimed at actually reuniting with the Catholic Church other Christians who basically agreed with Catholic doctrine, bringing them back under papal authority. To the broad pan-Protestant ecumenical movement he took a less favorable attitude.

He rejected, in his 1928 encyclical Mortalium animos, the idea that Christian unity could be attained by establishing a broad federation of many bodies holding conflicting doctrines; rather, the Catholic Church was the true Church of Christ. "The union of Christians can only be promoted by promoting the return to the one true Church of Christ of those who are separated from it, for in the past they have unhappily left it." The pronouncement also prohibited Catholics from joining groups that encouraged interfaith discussion without distinction.

The next year, the Vatican was successful in lobbying the Mussolini regime to require Catholic religious education in all schools, even those with a majority of Protestants or Jews. The Pope expressed his "great pleasure" with the move.

In 1934, the Fascist government at the Vatican's urging agreed to expand the prohibition of public gatherings of Protestants to include private worship in homes.

His encyclical letter Ad Catholici Sacerdotii, issued in December 1935, established a special votive mass for Thursdays honouring Jesus as "the supreme and ternal high priest" and set out his theology of the Catholic priesthood. He referred to his own papal position as the "summit of the Catholic priesthood".

=== Activities ===
==== Beatifications and canonizations ====
Pius XI canonized 34 saints during his pontificate, including Bernadette Soubirous (1933), Thérèse of Lisieux (1925), John Vianney (1925), John Fisher and Thomas More (1935), and John Bosco (1934). He also beatified 464 of the faithful, including Pierre-René Rogue (1934) and Noël Pinot (1926).

Pius XI also declared several saints to be Doctors of the Church:

- Peter Canisius (21 May 1925)
- John of the Cross (24 August 1926; naming him "Doctor mysticus" or "Mystical Doctor")
- Robert Bellarmine (17 September 1931)
- Albert the Great (16 December 1931; naming him "Doctor universalis" or "Universal Doctor")

==== Consistories ====
Pius XI created 76 cardinals in 17 consistories, including August Hlond (1927), Alfredo Ildefonso Schuster (1929), Raffaele Rossi (1930), Elia Dalla Costa (1933), and Giuseppe Pizzardo (1937). One of those was his successor, Eugenio Pacelli, who became Pope Pius XII. Pius XI in fact believed that Pacelli would be his successor and dropped many hints that this was his hope. On one such occasion at a consistory for new cardinals on 13 December 1937, while posing with the new cardinals, Pius XI pointed to Pacelli and told them: "He'll make a good pope!"

Pius XI also accepted the resignation of a cardinal from the cardinalate in 1927: the Jesuit Louis Billot.

The pope deviated from the usual practice of naming cardinals in collective consistories, opting instead for smaller and more frequent consistories, with some of them being less than six months apart. Unlike his predecessors, he increased the number of non-Italian cardinals.

In 1923, Pius XI wanted to appoint Ricardo Sanz de Samper y Campuzano (majordomo in the Papal Household) to the College of Cardinals but was forced to abandon the idea when King Alfonso XIII of Spain insisted that the pope appoint cardinals from South America despite the fact that Sanz hailed from Colombia. Since Pius XI did not want to appear to be influenced by political considerations, he chose in the December 1923 consistory to name no South American cardinals at all. According to an article by the historian Monsignor Vicente Cárcel y Ortí, a 1928 letter from Alfonso XIII asked the pope to restore Valencia as a cardinalitial see and appoint its archbishop, Prudencio Melo y Alcalde, a cardinal. Pius XI responded that he could not do so because Spain already had the habitual number of cardinals (set at four) with two of them fixed (Toledo and Seville) and the other two variable. Pius XI recommended that Alfonso XIII wait for a future occasion, but he never did make the archbishop a cardinal, and not until 2007 was the diocese given a cardinal archbishop. In December 1935, the pope intended to appoint the Jesuit priest Pietro Tacchi Venturi a cardinal, but abandoned the idea given that the British government would have regarded the move as a friendly gesture toward Fascism since the priest and Benito Mussolini were considered to be close.

== International relations ==
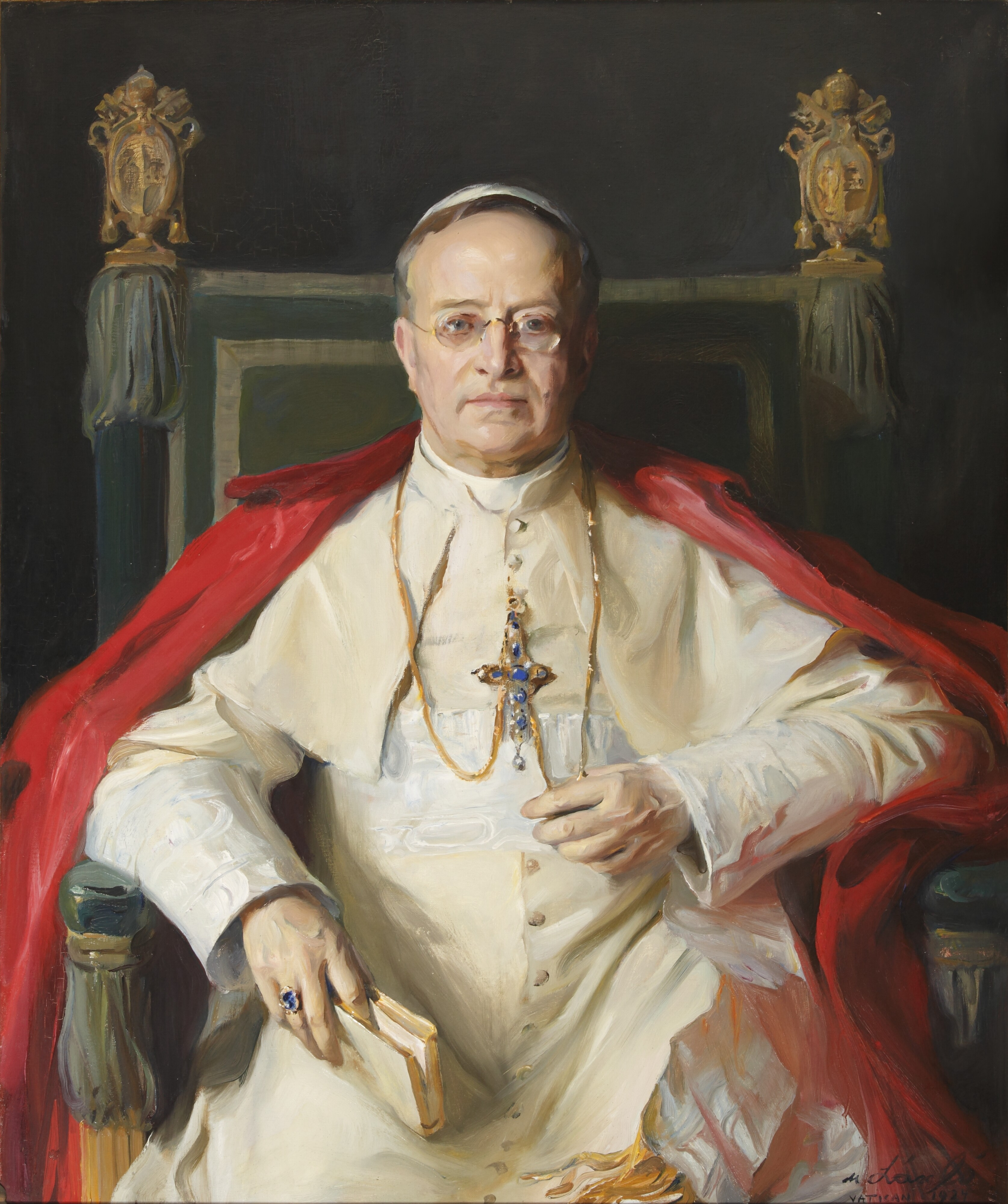
Portrait of Pope Pius XI, by Philip de László, c. 1924-25

The pontificate of Pius XI coincided with the early aftermath of the First World War. Many of the old European monarchies had been swept away and a new and precarious order formed across the continent. In the East, the Soviet Union arose. In Italy, the Fascist dictator Benito Mussolini took power, while in Germany, the fragile Weimar Republic collapsed with the Nazi seizure of power. His reign was one of busy diplomatic activity for the Vatican. The Church made advances on several fronts in the 1920s, improving relations with France and, most spectacularly, settling the Roman question with Italy and gaining recognition of an independent Vatican state.

Pius XI's major diplomatic approach was to make concordats. He concluded eighteen such treaties during the course of his pontificate. However, wrote Peter Hebblethwaite, these concordats did not prove "durable or creditable" and "wholly failed in their aim of safeguarding the institutional rights of the Church" for "Europe was entering a period in which such agreements were regarded as mere scraps of paper".

From 1933 to 1936 Pius wrote several protests against the Nazi regime, while his attitude to Mussolini's Italy changed dramatically in 1938, after Nazi racial policies were adopted in Italy. Pius XI watched the rising tide of totalitarianism with alarm and delivered three papal encyclicals challenging the new creeds: against Italian Fascism Non abbiamo bisogno (1931; "We Do Not Need [to Acquaint You]"); against Nazism Mit brennender Sorge (1937; "With Deep Concern"), and against atheist Communism Divini redemptoris (1937; "Divine Redeemer"). He also challenged the extremist nationalism of the Action Française movement and antisemitism in the United States.

=== Greek genocide ===
When Pius XI ascended to the papal throne, the Turkish National Movement under Mustafa Kemal Atatürk was waging the final phase of the Greek genocide. On 22 May 1922, the Association of Pontic Greeks in Constantinople appealed for his intervention after reporting massacres and the destruction of Greek communities in the Pontus. Pius XI proceeded to order humanitarian assistance to Greek refugees and prisoners, while also sending money which funded daily distributions of bread and soup to about 1,500 people, chiefly women with infants and children. In addition, Catholic relief workers cared for around 500 sick refugees.

On 9 September 1922, after the Turkish capture of Smyrna, Pius XI asked the Turks to spare the city's religious minorities, specifically Greeks and Armenians, from violence. Despite this, the Turks burned Smyrna on 13 September 1922 and massacred up to 100,000 Christians in the city.

After the burning and the subsequent deportations of the remaining Greeks to inner Anatolia, Pius XI asked the Turkish government for permission to send priests carrying money to Greeks being held at labour battalions and other concentration camps. The New Zealand Tablet reported on 7 December 1922 that Pius XI gave Bishop George Calavassy 400,000 Italian lire and explicitly ordered that the money be used for Greeks "of all religious confessions". He also gave 100,000 Italian lire to the Armenian Patriarchate in Cilicia.

In 1923, Pius XI sent a further 50,000 pounds in order to assist Pontic Greek victims of the genocide. After a complaint by a notable Turkish government official that the Holy See "offered great assistance and protection to our enemies", Pius XI also donated the same amount of money to Muslims displaced due to the war.

During the negotiations regarding the Treaty of Lausanne, Pius XI again spoke on behalf of the Greeks, asking the Entente to implement security and protective measures for the Greeks of Constantinople, noting that they were facing persecution. Ismet İnönü replied to him, disputing his assessment. İnönü later ordered the expulsion of Greeks from the city in 1964.

Pius XI kept supporting the Greeks financially and, by 1927, the newly established Catholic Near East Welfare Association had raised $1,000,000. Some of this money was sent to Athens to help Calavassy's humanitarian work with the Greek refugees.

=== Relations with France ===
France's republican government had long been anti-clerical, and much of the French Catholic Church anti-republican. The 1905 French law on the Separation of the Churches and the State had expelled many religious orders from France, declared all Church buildings to be government property, and had led to the closure of most Church schools. Since that time Pope Benedict XV had sought a rapprochement, but it was not achieved until the reign of Pope Pius XI. In Maximam gravissimamque (1924), many areas of dispute were tacitly settled and a bearable coexistence made possible.

In 1926, worried by the agnosticism of its leader Charles Maurras, Pius XI condemned the monarchist movement Action Française. The Pope also judged that it was folly for the French Church to continue to tie its fortunes to the unlikely dream of a monarchist restoration, and distrusted the movement's tendency to defend the Catholic religion in merely utilitarian and nationalistic terms. Prior to this, Action Française had operated with the support of a great number of French lay Catholics, such as Jacques Maritain, as well as members of the clergy. Pius XI's decision was strongly criticized by Cardinal Louis Billot who believed that the political activities of monarchist Catholics should not be censured by Rome. He later resigned from his position as Cardinal, the only man to do so in the twentieth century, which is believed by some to have been the ultimate result of Pius XI's condemnation, though these claims have been disputed. (Note: Action Française claimed Billot's resignation was in direct response to the Pope's censure of their organization, however this narrative contrasts with official statements released by the Holy See, affirming that Billot's relationship with the Pope remained amicable and his reason for resigning was due to his advanced age, which was 81. According to Church officials, Billot had only an academic interest in Action Française.) Pius XI's successor, Pope Pius XII, repealed the papal ban on the group in 1939, once again allowing Catholics to associate themselves with the movement. However, despite Pius XII's actions to rehabilitate the group, Action Française ultimately never recovered to their former status.

=== Relations with Italy and the Lateran Treaties ===
Pius XI aimed to end the long breach between the papacy and the Italian government and to gain recognition once more of the sovereign independence of the Holy See. Most of the Papal States had been seized by the forces of King Victor Emmanuel II of Italy (1861–1878) in 1860 at the foundation of the modern unified Italian state, and the rest, including Rome, in 1870. The Papacy and the Italian Government had been at odds ever since: the Popes had refused to recognise the Italian state's seizure of the Papal States, instead withdrawing to become prisoners in the Vatican, and the Italian government's policies had always been anti-clerical. Now Pius XI thought a compromise would be the best solution.

To bolster his own new regime, Benito Mussolini was also eager for an agreement. After years of negotiation, in 1929, the Pope supervised the signing of the Lateran Treaties with the Italian government. According to the terms of the treaty that was one of the agreed documents, Vatican City was given sovereignty as an independent nation in return for the Vatican relinquishing its claim to the former territories of the Papal States. Pius XI thus became a head of state (albeit the smallest state in the world), the first Pope who could be termed a head of state since the Papal States fell after the unification of Italy in the 19th century. The concordat that was another of the agreed documents of 1929 recognised Catholicism as the sole religion of the state (as it already was under Italian law, while other religions were tolerated), paid salaries to priests and bishops, gave civil recognition to church marriages (previously couples had to have a civil ceremony), and brought religious instruction into the public schools. In turn, the bishops swore allegiance to the Italian state, which had veto power over their selection. The Church was not officially obligated to support the Fascist regime; the strong differences remained, but the seething hostility ended. Friction continued over the Catholic Action youth network, which Mussolini wanted to merge into his Fascist youth group.

The third document in the agreement paid the Vatican 1.75 billion lira (about $100 million) for the seizures of church property since 1860. Pius XI invested the money in the stock markets and real estate. To manage these investments, the Pope appointed the lay-person Bernardino Nogara, who, through shrewd investing in stocks, gold, and futures markets, significantly increased the Catholic Church's financial holdings. The income largely paid for the upkeep of the expensive-to-maintain stock of historic buildings in the Vatican which until 1870 had been maintained through funds raised from the Papal States.

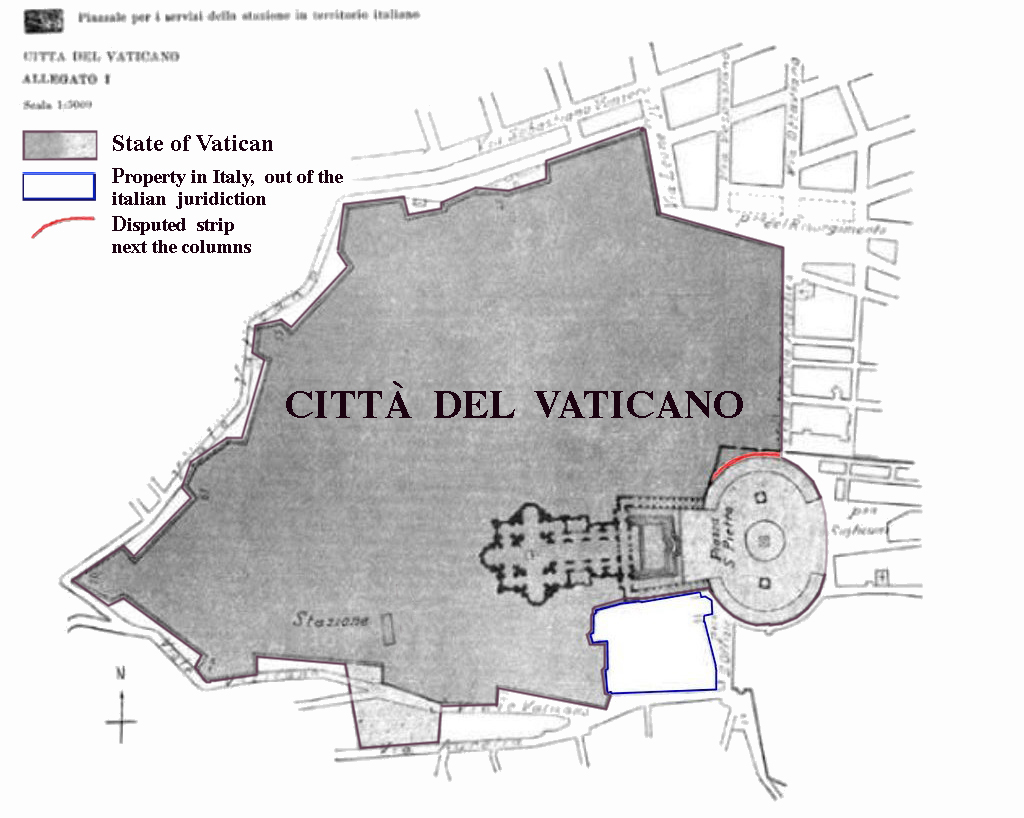
Boundary map of Vatican City, taken from the annex of the Lateran Treaty

The Vatican's relationship with Mussolini's government deteriorated drastically after 1930 as Mussolini's totalitarian ambitions began to impinge more and more on the autonomy of the Church. For example, the Fascists tried to absorb the Church's youth groups. In response, Pius issued the encyclical Non abbiamo bisogno ("We Have No Need)" in 1931. It denounced the regime's persecution of the church in Italy and condemned "pagan worship of the State." It also condemned Fascism's "revolution which snatches the young from the Church and from Jesus Christ, and which inculcates in its own young people hatred, violence and irreverence".

From the earliest days of the Nazi takeover in Germany, the Vatican was taking diplomatic action to attempt to defend the Jews of Germany. In the spring of 1933, Pope Pius XI urged Mussolini to ask Hitler to restrain the antisemitic actions taking place in Germany. Mussolini urged Pius to excommunicate Hitler, as he thought it would render him less powerful in Catholic Austria and reduce the danger to Italy and wider Europe. The Vatican refused to comply and thereafter Mussolini began to work with Hitler, adopting his antisemitic and race theories. In 1936, with the Church in Germany facing clear persecution, Italy and Germany agreed to the Berlin–Rome Axis.

=== Relations with Germany and Austria ===
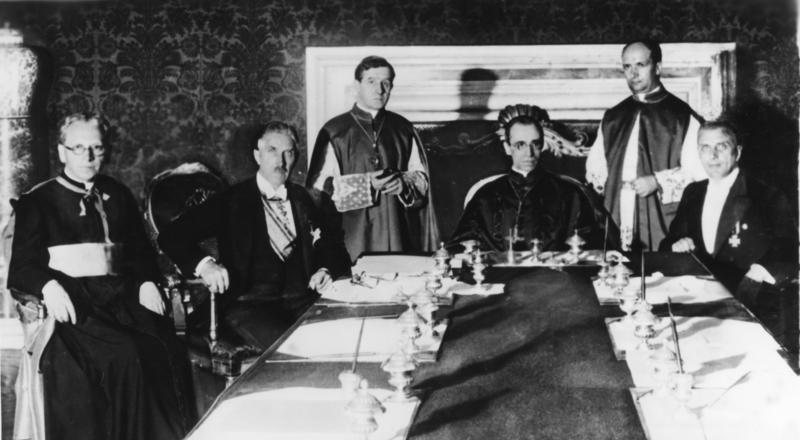
Signing of the Reichskonkordat on 20 July 1933. From left to right: German prelate Ludwig Kaas, German Vice-Chancellor Franz von Papen, representing Germany, Monsignor Giuseppe Pizzardo, Cardinal Pacelli, Monsignor Alfredo Ottaviani, German ambassador Rudolf Buttmann.

The Nazis, like the Pope, were unalterably opposed to Communism. In the years leading up to the 1933 election, the German bishops opposed the Nazi Party by proscribing German Catholics from joining and participating in it. This changed by the end of March after Cardinal Michael Von Faulhaber of Munich met with the Pope. One author claims that Pius expressed support for the regime soon after Hitler's rise to power, with the author asserting that he said, "I have changed my mind about Hitler, it is for the first time that such a government voice has been raised to denounce Bolshevism in such categorical terms, joining with the voice of the pope."

A threatening, though initially sporadic persecution of the Catholic Church in Germany followed the 1933 Nazi takeover in Germany. In the dying days of the Weimar Republic, the newly appointed Chancellor Adolf Hitler moved quickly to eliminate political Catholicism. Vice Chancellor Franz von Papen was dispatched to Rome to negotiate a Reich concordat with the Holy See. Ian Kershaw wrote that the Vatican was anxious to reach an agreement with the new government, despite "continuing molestation of Catholic clergy, and other outrages committed by Nazi radicals against the Church and its organisations". Negotiations were conducted by Cardinal Eugenio Pacelli, who later became Pope Pius XII (1939–1958). The Reichskonkordat was signed by Pacelli and by the German government in June 1933, and included guarantees of liberty for the Church, independence for Catholic organisations and youth groups, and religious teaching in schools. The treaty was an extension of existing concordats already signed with Prussia and Bavaria, but, wrote Hebblethwaite, it seemed "more like a surrender than anything else: it involved the suicide of the [Catholic] Centre Party... ".

"The agreement", wrote William Shirer, "was hardly put to paper before it was being broken by the Nazi Government". On 25 July, the Nazis promulgated their sterilization law, an offensive policy in the eyes of the Catholic Church. Five days later, moves began to dissolve the Catholic Youth League. Clergy, nuns and lay leaders began to be targeted, leading to thousands of arrests over the ensuing years, often on trumped up charges of currency smuggling or "immorality".

In February 1936, Hitler sent Pius a telegram congratulating the Pope on the anniversary of his coronation, but Pius responded with criticisms of what was happening in Germany so forcefully that the German foreign secretary Konstantin von Neurath wanted to suppress the response, but Pius insisted it be forwarded to Hitler.

==== Austria ====
The pope supported the Christian Social Party in Austria, a country with an overwhelmingly Catholic population but a powerful secular element. He especially supported the regime of Engelbert Dollfuss (1932–1934), who wanted to remold society based on papal encyclicals. Dollfuss suppressed the anti-clerical factions and the socialists, but was assassinated by Austrian Nazis in 1934. His successor Kurt von Schuschnigg (1934–1938) was also pro-Catholic and received Vatican support. The Anschluss saw the annexation of Austria by Nazi Germany in early 1938.

At the direction of Cardinal Theodor Innitzer, the churches of Vienna pealed their bells and flew swastikas for Hitler's arrival in the city on 14 March. However, wrote Mark Mazower, such gestures of accommodation were "not enough to assuage the Austrian Nazi radicals, foremost among them the young Gauleiter Globocnik". Globocnik launched a campaign against the Church, confiscating property, closing Catholic organisations, and sending many priests to Dachau. Anger at the treatment of the Church in Austria grew quickly and October 1938, wrote Mazower, saw the "very first act of overt mass resistance to the new regime", when a rally of thousands left Mass in Vienna chanting "Christ is our Fuehrer", before being dispersed by police. A Nazi mob ransacked Cardinal Innitzer's residence, after he denounced Nazi persecution of the Church. The American National Catholic Welfare Conference wrote that Pope Pius, "again protested against the violence of the Nazis, in language recalling Nero and Judas the Betrayer, comparing Hitler with Julian the Apostate."

==== Mit brennender Sorge ====
The Nazis claimed jurisdiction over all collective and social activity and interfered with Catholic schooling, youth groups, workers' clubs and cultural societies. By early 1937, the church hierarchy in Germany, which had initially attempted to co-operate with the new government, had become highly disillusioned. In March, Pope Pius XI issued the encyclical Mit brennender Sorge accusing the Nazi Government of violations of the 1933 Concordat, and of sowing the "tares of suspicion, discord, hatred, calumny, of secret and open fundamental hostility to Christ and His Church". The Pope noted on the horizon the "threatening storm clouds" of religious wars of extermination over Germany.

Copies had to be smuggled into Germany so they could be read from church pulpits. The encyclical, the only one ever written in German, was addressed to German bishops and was read in all parishes of Germany. The text is credited to Munich Cardinal Michael von Faulhaber and to Cardinal Secretary of State Eugenio Pacelli, who later became Pope Pius XII.

There was no advance announcement of the encyclical, and its distribution was kept secret in an attempt to ensure the unhindered public reading of its contents in all the Catholic churches of Germany. The encyclical condemned particularly the paganism of Nazism, the myth of race and blood, and fallacies in the Nazi conception of God:

Whoever exalts race, or the people, or the State, or a particular form of State, or the depositories of power, or any other fundamental value of the human community – however necessary and honorable be their function in worldly things – whoever raises these notions above their standard value and divinizes them to an idolatrous level, distorts and perverts an order of the world planned and created by God; he is far from the true faith in God and from the concept of life which that faith upholds.

The Nazis responded with an intensification of their campaign against the churches, beginning around April. There were mass arrests of clergy and church presses were expropriated.

==== Response of the press and governments ====
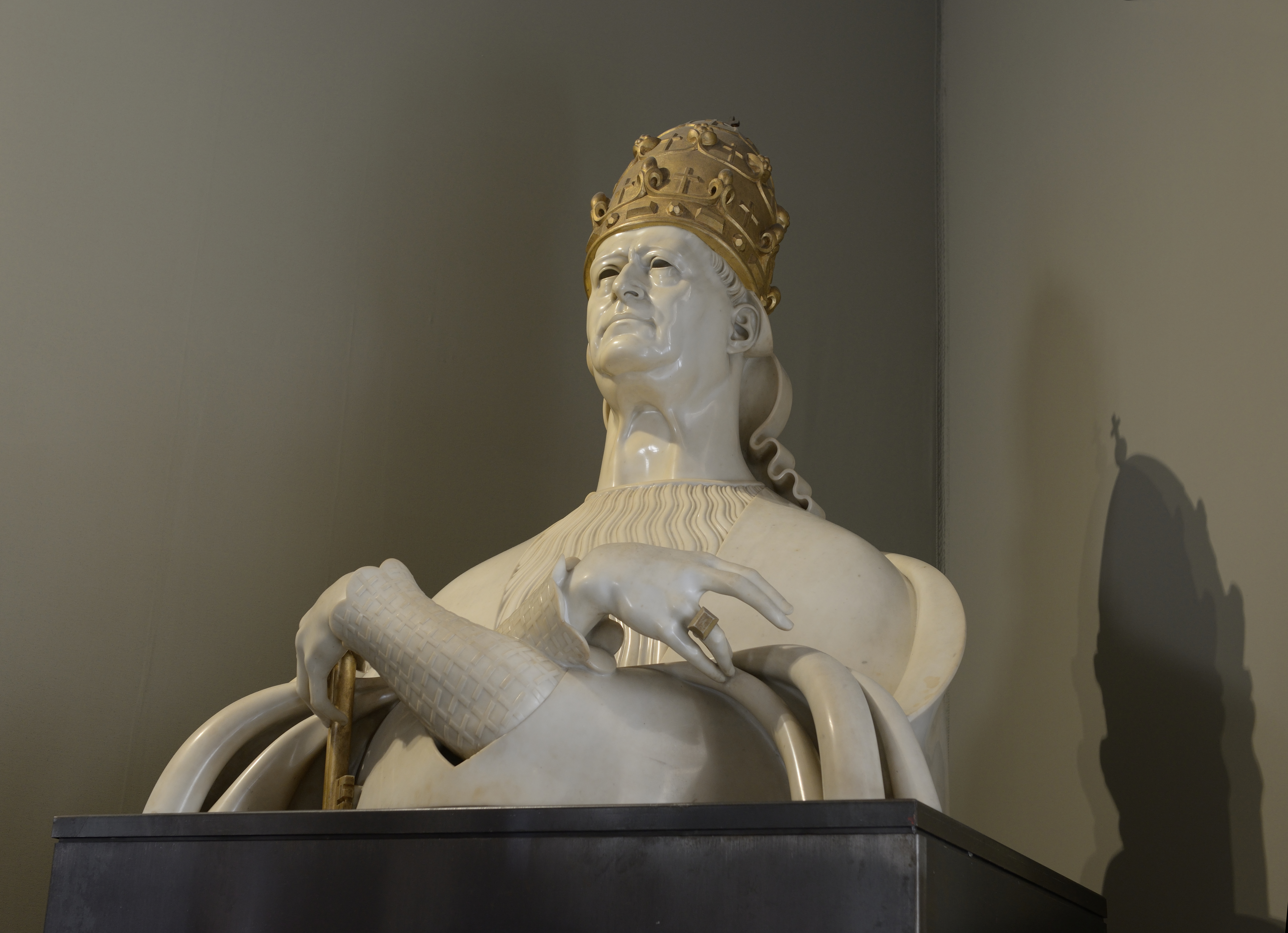
Pope Pius XI in a portrait by Adolfo Wildt exposed in the Vatican Museums in Rome

While numerous German Catholics, including those who participated in the secret printing and distribution of the encyclical, went to jail and concentration camps, the Western democracies remained silent, which Pius XI labeled bitterly a "conspiracy of silence". As the extreme nature of Nazi racial antisemitism became obvious, and as Mussolini in the late 1930s began imitating Hitler's anti-Jewish race laws in Italy, Pius XI continued to make his position clear. After Fascist Italy's Manifesto of Race was published, the pope said in a public address in the Vatican to Belgian pilgrims in 1938: "Mark well that in the Catholic Mass, Abraham is our Patriarch and forefather. Antisemitism is incompatible with the lofty thought which that fact expresses. It is a movement with which we Christians can have nothing to do. No, no, I say to you it is impossible for a Christian to take part in antisemitism. It is inadmissible. Through Christ and in Christ we are the spiritual progeny of Abraham. Spiritually, we [Christians] are all Semites". These comments were reported by neither Osservatore Romano nor Vatican Radio. They were reported in Belgium on 14 September 1938 issue of La Libre Belgique and on 17 September 1938 issue of French Catholic daily La Croix. They were then published worldwide but had little resonance at the time in the secular media. The "conspiracy of silence" included not only the silence of secular powers against the horrors of Nazism but also their silence on the persecution of the Church in Mexico, the Soviet Union and Spain. Despite these public comments, Pius was reported to have suggested privately that the Church's problems in those three countries were "reinforced by the anti-Christian spirit of Judaism".

==== Kristallnacht ====
In 1933, when the new Nazi government began to instigate its program of antisemitism, Pius XI ordered the papal nuncio in Berlin, Cesare Orsenigo, to "look into whether and how it may be possible to become involved" in aiding Jews. Orsenigo proved ineffective in this, concerned more with anti-church Nazi policies, and how these might affect German Catholics.

On 11 November 1938, following the Nazi Kristallnacht pogrom, Pius XI joined Western leaders in condemning the pogrom. In response, the Nazis organised mass demonstrations against Catholics and Jews in Munich, and the Bavarian Gauleiter Adolf Wagner declared before 5,000 protesters: "Every utterance the Pope makes in Rome is an incitement of the Jews throughout the world to agitate against Germany". On 21 November, in an address to the world's Catholics, the Pope rejected the Nazi claim of racial superiority, and insisted instead that there is only a single human race. Robert Ley, the Nazi Minister of Labour declared the following day in Vienna: "No compassion will be tolerated for the Jews. We deny the Pope's statement that there is but one human race. The Jews are parasites." Catholic leaders, including Cardinal Alfredo Ildefonso Schuster of Milan, Cardinal Jozef-Ernest van Roey in Belgium and Cardinal Jean Verdier in Paris, backed the Pope's strong condemnation of Kristallnacht.

=== Relations with East Asia ===
Under Pius XI, papal relations with East Asia were marked by the rise of the Empire of Japan to prominence, as well as the unification of China under Chiang Kai-shek. In 1922 he established the position of Apostolic Delegate to China, and the first person in that capacity was Celso Benigno Luigi Costantini. Costantini's focus was to implement the directives of the encyclical Maximum illud. In some historical views, Costantini's arrival in China marks the end of the French religious protectorate in China.

On 1 August 1928, the Pope addressed a message of support for the political unification of China. Following the Japanese invasion of Manchuria in 1931 and the creation of Manchukuo, the Holy See recognized the new state. On 10 September 1938, the Pope held a reception at Castel Gandolfo for an official delegation from Manchukuo, headed by Manchukuoan Minister of Foreign Affairs Ts'ai Yün-sheng.

=== Involvement with American efforts ===
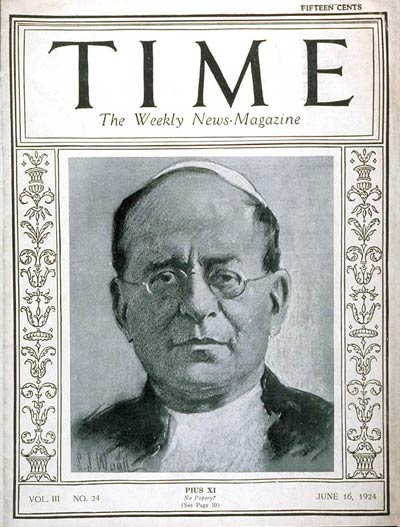
Time cover, 16 June 1924

Mother Katharine Drexel, who founded the American order of Sisters of the Blessed Sacrament for Indians and Colored People, corresponded with Pius XI, as she had with his papal predecessors. (In 1887, Pope Leo XIII had encouraged Katharine Drexel—then a young Philadelphia socialite— to do missionary work with America's disadvantaged people of color). In the early 1930s, Mother Drexel wrote Pius XI asking him to bless a publicity campaign to acquaint white Catholics with the needs of the disadvantaged races among them. An emissary had shown him photos of Xavier University, a college for blacks in New Orleans which Mother Drexel had founded to provide higher education to Catholic African-Americans. Pius XI replied promptly, sending his blessing and encouragement. Upon his return, the emissary told Mother Katharine that the Pope said he had read the novel Uncle Tom's Cabin as a boy, and it had ignited his lifelong concern for the American Negro.

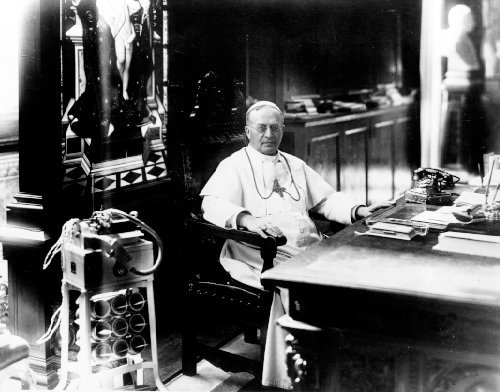
Pope Pius XI at his workdesk

=== Brazil ===
In 1930, Pius XI declared the Immaculate Conception under the title of Our Lady of Aparecida as the Queen and Patroness of Brazil.

=== Persecution of Christians ===
Pius XI was faced with unprecedented persecution of the Catholic Church in Mexico and Spain and with the persecution of all Christians, especially the Eastern Catholic Churches, in the Soviet Union. He called this the "terrible triangle".

==== Soviet Union ====
Worried by the persecution of Christians in the Soviet Union, Pius XI mandated Berlin nuncio Eugenio Pacelli to work secretly on diplomatic arrangements between the Vatican and the Soviet Union. Pacelli negotiated food shipments for Russia and met with Soviet representatives, including Foreign Minister Georgi Chicherin, who rejected any kind of religious education and the ordination of priests and bishops but offered agreements without the points vital to the Vatican. Despite Vatican pessimism and a lack of visible progress, Pacelli continued the secret negotiations, until Pius XI ordered them discontinued in 1927 because they generated no results and would be dangerous to the Church if made public.

The "harsh persecution short of total annihilation of the clergy, monks, and nuns and other people associated with the Church", continued well into the 1930s. In addition to executing and exiling many clerics, monks and laymen, the confiscation of Church implements "for victims of famine" and the closing of churches were common. Yet according to an official report based on the census of 1936, some 55% of Soviet citizens identified themselves openly as religious.

==== Mexico ====
During the pontificate of Pius XI, the Catholic Church was subjected to extreme persecutions in Mexico, which resulted in the death of over 5,000 priests, bishops and followers. In the state of Tabasco the Church was in effect outlawed altogether. In his encyclical Iniquis afflictisque from 18 November 1926, Pope Pius protested against the slaughter and persecution. The United States intervened in 1929 and mediated an agreement. The persecutions resumed in 1931. Pius XI condemned the Mexican government again in his 1932 encyclical Acerba animi. Problems continued with reduced hostilities until 1940, when in the new pontificate of Pope Pius XII President Manuel Ávila Camacho returned the Mexican churches to the Catholic Church.

There were 4,500 Mexican priests serving Mexican believers before the rebellion. In 1934 over 90% of them suffered persecution as only 334 priests were licensed by the government to serve fifteen million people. Excluding foreign religious, over 4,100 Mexican priests were eliminated by emigration, expulsion and assassination. By 1935, 17 Mexican states were left with no priests at all.

==== Spain ====
The Republican government which came to power in Spain in 1931 was strongly anti-clerical, secularising education, prohibiting religious education in the schools, and expelling the Jesuits from the country. On Pentecost 1932, Pope Pius XI protested against these measures and demanded restitution.

== Syro-Malankara Catholic Church ==
Pius XI accepted the Reunion Movement of Mar Ivanios along with four other members of the Malankara Orthodox Church in 1930. As a result of the Reunion Movement, the Syro-Malankara Catholic Church is in full communion with the Bishop of Rome and the Catholic Church.

== Condemnation of racism ==
The Fascist government in Italy abstained from copying Germany's racial and anti-Semitic laws and regulations until 1938, when Italy introduced anti-Semitic legislation. In a public speech, the Pope sought to dissuade Italy from adopting demeaning racist legislation, stating that the term "race" is divisive, more appropriate to differentiate animals. He said the Catholic view sees instead "the unity of human society" whose differences are like the different tones in music. Italy, a civilized country, should not be led by the barbarian German legislation. He also criticized the Italian government for attacking Catholic Action and even the papacy itself.

In April 1938, at the request of Pius XI, the Sacred Congregation of seminaries and universities developed a syllabus condemning racist theories. Its publication was postponed.

In one historian's view:

By the time of his death ... Pius XI had managed to orchestrate a swelling chorus of Church protests against the racial legislation and the ties that bound Italy to Germany. He had single-mindedly continued to denounce the evils of the Nazi regime at every possible opportunity and feared above all else the re-opening of the rift between Church and State in his beloved Italy. He had, however, few tangible successes. There had been little improvement in the position of the Church in Germany and there was growing hostility to the Church in Italy on the part of the fascist regime. Almost the only positive result of the last years of his pontificate was a closer relationship with the liberal democracies and yet, even this was seen by many as representing a highly partisan stance on the part of the Pope.

=== Humani generis unitas ===
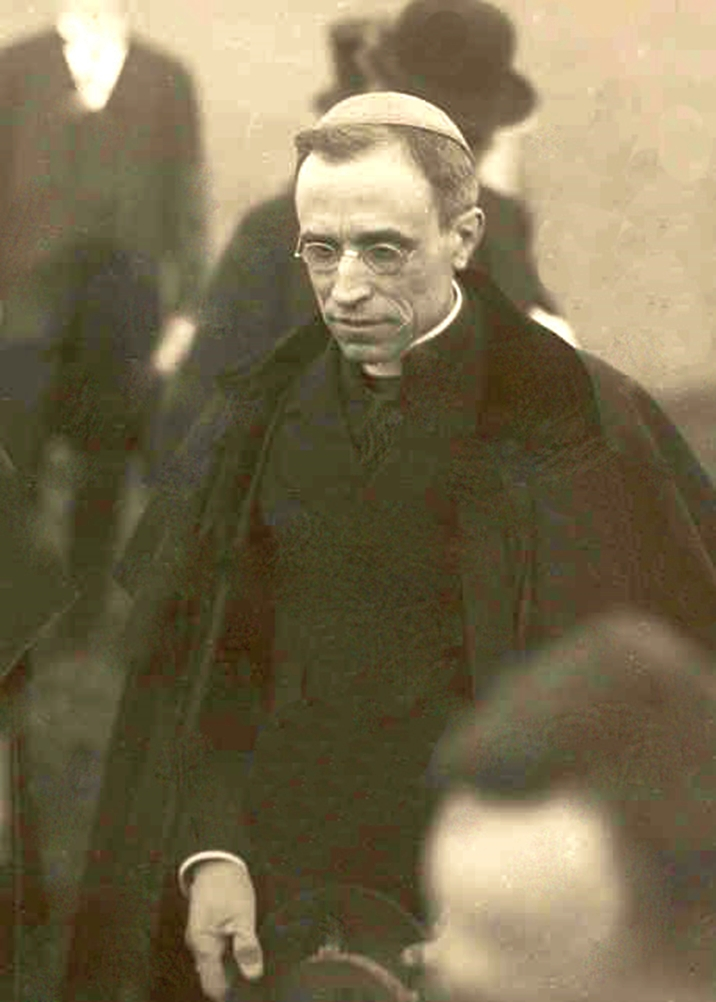
Pacelli in 1922, then Nuncio to Germany

Pius XI planned an encyclical Humani generis unitas (The Unity of the Human Race) to denounce racism in the United States, Europe and elsewhere, as well as antisemitism, colonialism and violent German nationalism. He died without issuing it. Pius XI's successor, Pius XII, who was not aware of the draft encyclical, chose not to publish it. However, Pius XII's first encyclical Summi Pontificatus ("On the Supreme Pontificate", 12 October 1939), published after the beginning of World War II, bore the subtitle On the Unity of Human Society and used many of the arguments of the document drafted for Pius XI, while avoiding its negative characterizations of the Jewish people.

To denounce racism and anti-Semitism, Pius XI sought out the American journalist priest John LaFarge SJ and summoned him to Castel Gandolfo on 25 June 1938. The pope told the Jesuit that he planned to write an encyclical denouncing racism, and asked LaFarge to help write it while swearing him to strict silence. LaFarge took up this task in secret in Paris, but the Jesuit Superior-General Wlodimir Ledóchowski SJ promised the pope and LaFarge that he would facilitate the encyclical's production. This proved to be a hindrance since Ledóchowski was privately an anti-Semite and conspired to block LaFarge's efforts whenever and wherever possible. In late September 1938, the Jesuit had finished his work and returned to Rome, where Ledóchowski welcomed him and promised to deliver the work to the pope immediately. LaFarge was directed to return to the United States, while Ledóchowski concealed the draft from the pope, who remained wholly unaware of what had transpired.

But in the fall of 1938, LaFarge had realized the Pope still had not received the draft and sent a letter to Pius XI where he implied that Ledóchowski had the document in his possession. Pius XI demanded that the draft be delivered to him, but did not receive it until 21 January 1939 with a note from Ledóchowski, who warned that the draft's language was excessive and advised caution. Pius XI planned to issue the encyclical following his meeting with bishops on 11 February, but died before both the meeting and encyclical's promulgation could take place.

== Personality ==
Pius XI was seen as a blunt-spoken and no-nonsense man, qualities he shared with Pope Pius X. He was passionate about science and was fascinated with the power of radio, which would soon result in the founding and inauguration of Vatican Radio. He was intrigued by new forms of technology that he employed during his pontificate. He was also known for a rare smile.

Pius XI was known to have a temper at times and was someone who had a keen sense of knowledge and dignity of the office he held. In keeping with a papal tradition discarded by his immediate predecessors he insisted that he eat alone with no one around him and would not allow his assistants or any other priests or clergy to dine with him. He would frequently meet with political figures but would always greet them seated. He insisted that when his brother and sister wanted to see him, they had to refer to him as "Your Holiness" and book an appointment.

Pius XI was also a very demanding individual, certainly one of the stricter pontiffs at that time. He held very high standards and did not tolerate any sort of behaviour that was not up to that standard. In regard to Angelo Roncalli, the future Pope John XXIII, a diplomatic blunder in Bulgaria, where Roncalli was stationed, led Pius XI to make Roncalli kneel for 45 minutes as a punishment. However, when in due course Pius learned that Roncalli had made the error in circumstances for which he could not fairly be considered culpable, he apologized to him. Aware of the implied impropriety of a Supreme Pontiff's going back on a reprimand in a matter concerning Catholic faith and morals, but also deeply conscious that on a human level he had failed to keep his temper in check, he made his apology "as Achille Ratti" and in doing so stretched out his hand in friendship to Monsignor Roncalli.

== Death and burial ==
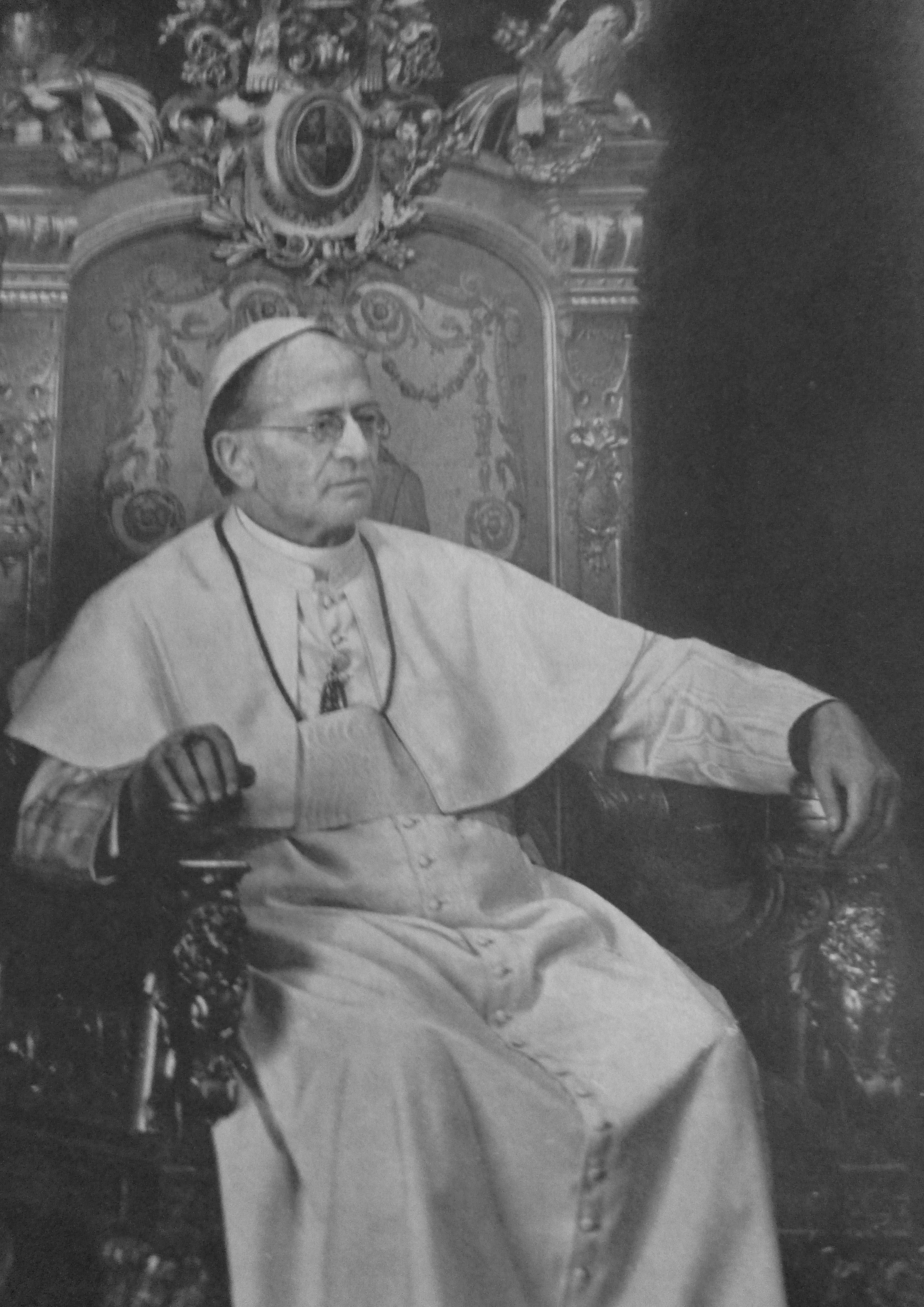
Pius XI on 6 February 1939, 4 days before his death

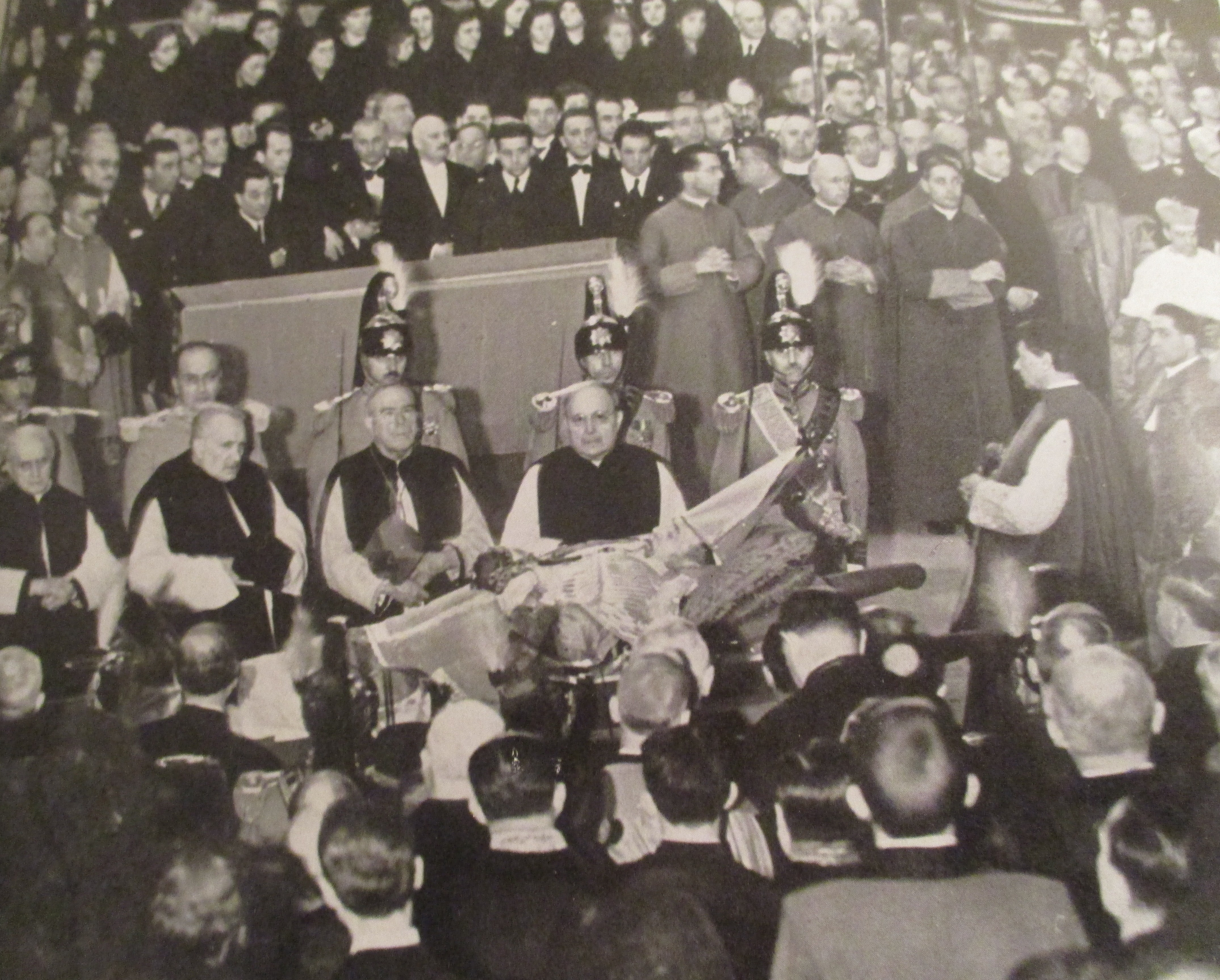
The funeral of Pius XI

Pius XI had been ill for some time when, on 25 November 1938, he suffered two heart attacks within several hours. He had serious breathing problems and could not leave his apartment. He gave his last major pontifical address to the Pontifical Academy of Sciences, which he had founded, speaking without a prepared text on the relation between science and the Catholic religion. Medical specialists reported that heart insufficiency combined with bronchial attacks had hopelessly complicated his already poor prospects.

Pius XI died at 5:31 a.m. (Rome time) of a third heart attack on 10 February 1939, at the age of 81. His last words to those near him at the time of his death were spoken with clarity and firmness: "My soul parts from you all in peace." Some believe he was murdered, based on the fact that his primary physician, Francesco Petacci, was the father of Claretta Petacci, Mussolini's mistress. Cardinal Eugène Tisserant wrote in his diary that the pope had been murdered, a claim that Carlo Confalonieri later strongly denied.

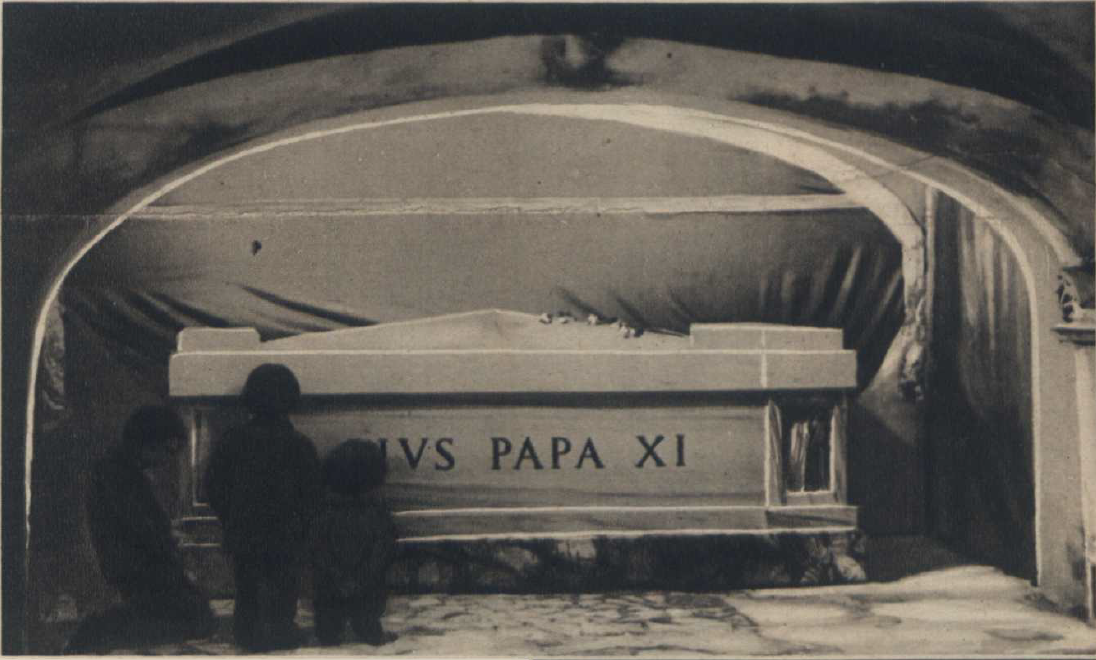
Pius XI's tomb as seen on 4 March 1939.

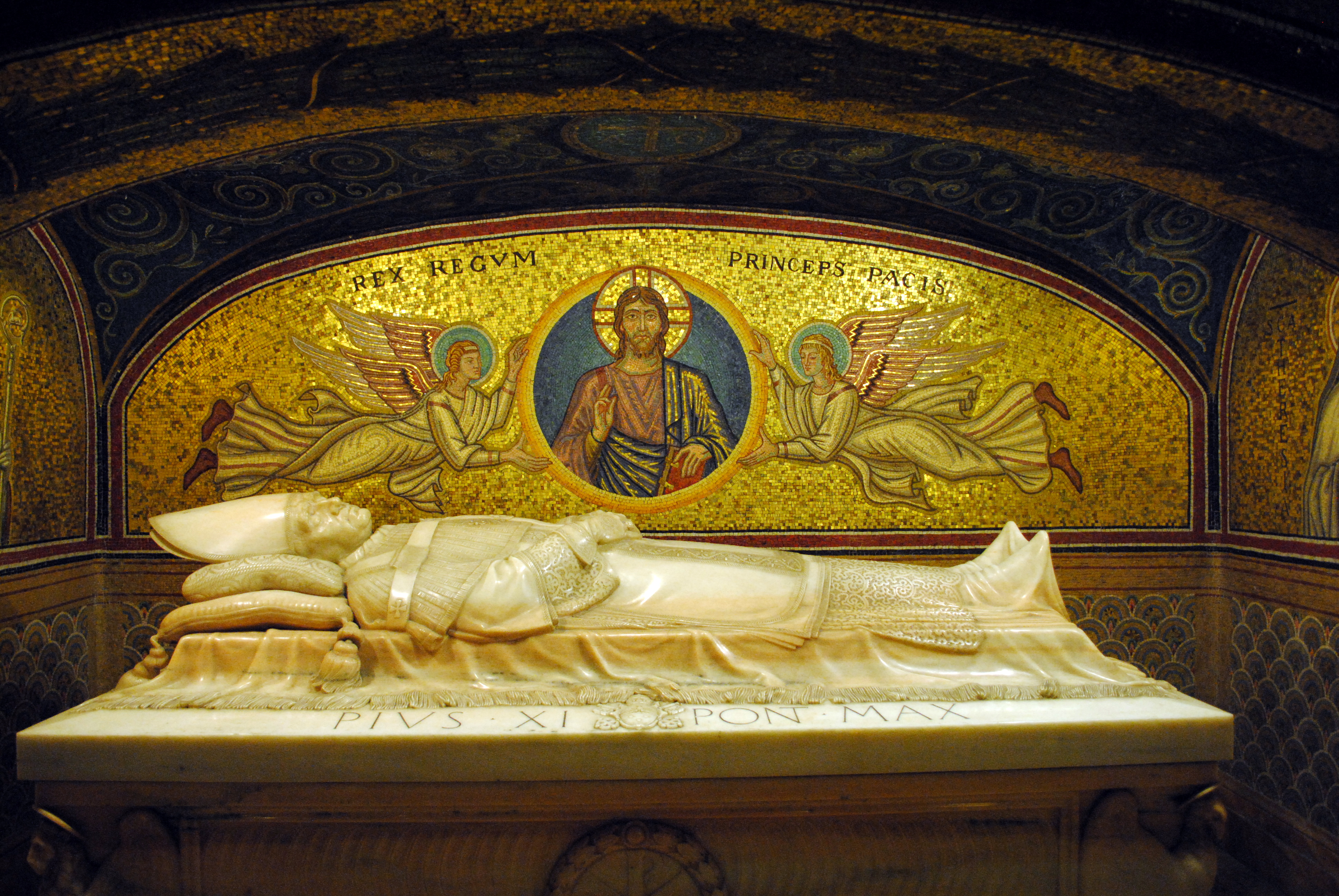
The tomb of Pius XI in the grottoes of Saint Peter's Basilica.

The Pope's last audible words were reported to have been "peace, peace". Those at his bedside at 4:00 am realized that his end was near, at which stage the sacrist was summoned to administer the final sacrament 11 minutes before the pope's death. The pontiff's confessor Cardinal Lorenzo Lauri arrived a few seconds too late. After his final words, the pope's lips moved slowly. Rocchi said it was possible to discern that the pope was making an effort to recite a Latin prayer. About half a minute before his death, Pius XI raised his right hand weakly and tried making the sign of the Cross to impart his last blessing to those gathered at his bedside. One of the last things he was reported to have said was "We still had so many things to do". He died among a low murmur of psalms recited by those present. Upon his death, his face was covered by a white veil. Pacelli, in accordance with his duties as Camerlengo, lifted the veil and gently struck the pope's forehead three times with a small, ceremonial silver hammer, reciting his Christian name (Achille) and pausing for an answer to confirm that the pope had died, before turning to those present and in Latin saying: "Truly the pope is dead."

Upon Pius XI's death, the Anglican Archbishop of Canterbury Cosmo Lang paid tribute to his efforts for world peace, calling him a man of "sincere piety" who bore his duties with exceptional "dignity and courage". Others who sent messages of condolences were Benito Mussolini and Adolf Hitler, the former visiting the Vatican to pay his respects. Flags were flown half-staff in Rome, Paris, and Berlin.

Pius XI's body was placed in a wooden coffin, placed in a bronze casket, which was then placed in a lead casket. The casket was designed by Antonio Berti. Pius XI was buried in the crypt of St. Peter's Basilica on 14 February 1939, in the Chapel of Saint Sebastian, close to Saint Peter's tomb. The day of the funeral was a day of mourning in Italy and Ireland. His tomb was modified in 1944 to be more ornate.

== Legacy ==
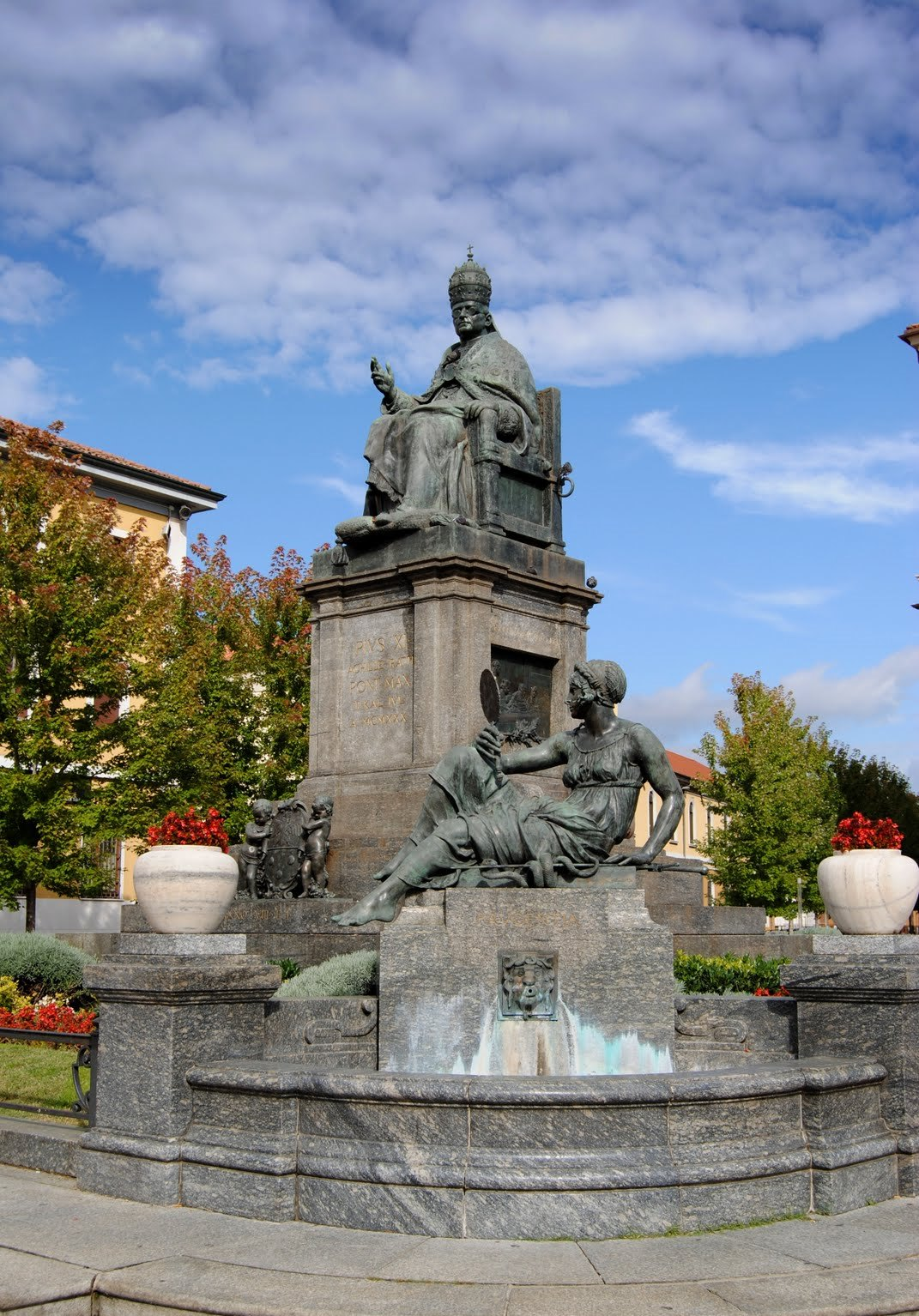
Statue in Desio

Pius XI is remembered as the pope who reigned between the two great wars of the 20th century. Although he served as the librarian who reorganized the Vatican archives, he was hardly a withdrawn and bookish figure. He also refounded the Pontifical Academy of Sciences in 1936, with the aim of turning it into the "scientific senate" of the Church. Hostile to any form of ethnic or religious discrimination, he appointed over 80 academicians from various countries, backgrounds, and areas of research. In his honor, John XXIII established the Pius XI Medal, which the Council of the Pontifical Academy of Sciences awards to a young scientist under 45 who has distinguished himself or herself at the international level.

The Syro-Malankara Catholic Church founded a school in his name in Kattanam, Alappuzha, Kerala, India (Pope Pius XI Higher Secondary School, Kattanam).

Pius XI High School in Milwaukee, Wisconsin, founded in 1929, is named in honor of the pontiff.

Pius was a well-known mountain climber. If a cardinal turned up his nose at the Pope's lofty goals, Pius XI would say: "We have no fear of heights." Alpine clubs and mountaineering associations all over the world have honored the mountaineering pope with numerous awards − and also nominations. The Weisskugelhütte (a mountain hut for overnight stays for mountaineers) in the South Tyrolean part of the Ötztal Alps is called "Rifugio Pio XI alla palla biancha" in Italian. A Chilean glacier, the Brüggen Glacier, the largest glacier in Patagonia, is also known as Pío XI Glacier. In 1942, Bishop T. B. Pearson founded the Achille Ratti Climbing Club, based in the United Kingdom and named for Pius XI. In 1923, Pius XI designated Saint Bernard of Menthon, founder of the Great St Bernard Hospice, one of the first institutions for rescue in mountaineering distress, as patron saint of mountaineers and Alpine dwellers. He entrusted the Augustinian Canons of the hospice, all of whom possessed high mountaineering skills, with an extremely difficult task—the Catholic mission on the "Roof of the World", Tibet.

== Episcopal genealogy ==
- Cardinal Scipione Rebiba
- Cardinal Giulio Antonio Santorio
- Cardinal Girolamo Bernerio
- Bishop Claudio Rangoni
- Archbishop Wawrzyniec Gembicki
- Archbishop Jan Wężyk
- Bishop Piotr Gembicki
- Bishop Jan Gembicki
- Bishop Bonawentura Madaliński
- Bishop Jan Małachowski
- Archbishop Stanisław Szembek
- Bishop Felicjan Konstanty Szaniawski
- Bishop Andrzej Stanisław Załuski
- Archbishop Adam Ignacy Komorowski
- Archbishop Władysław Aleksander Łubieński
- Bishop Andrzej Mikolaj Stanisław Kostka Mlodziejowski
- Archbishop Kasper Kazimierz Cieciszowski
- Bishop Franciszek Borgiasz Mackiewicz
- Bishop Michał Piwnicki
- Archbishop Ignacy Ludwik Pawłowski
- Archbishop Kazimierz Roch Dmochowski
- Archbishop Wacław Żyliński
- Bishop Aleksander Kazimierz Beresniewicz
- Bishop Szymon Marcin Kozlowski
- Bishop Mieczysław Leonard Pallulon
- Archbishop Bolesław Hieronim Klopotowski
- Archbishop Jerzy Józef Elizeusz Szembek
- Bishop Stanisław Kazimierz Zdzitowiecki
- Cardinal Aleksander Kakowski
- Pope Pius XI

== See also ==
- Cardinals created by Pius XI
- List of encyclicals of Pope Pius XI
- Pope Pius XI and Judaism

== Sources and further reading ==
- Browne-Olf, Lillian. Their Name Is Pius (1941) pp 305–59 online
- Confalonieri, Carlo (1975). Pius XI – A Close Up. Altadena, California: The Benzinger Sisters Press.
- Eisner, Peter, (2013), The Pope's Last Crusade: How an American Jesuit Helped Pope Pius XI's Campaign to Stop Hitler, New York, New York: HarperCollins |ISBN 978-0-06-204914-8
- Fattorini, Emma (2011), Hitler, Mussolini and the Vatican: Pope Pius XI and the Speech that was Never Made, Cambridge, UK; Malden, MA: Polity Press
- Job 6:15
- Kershaw, Ian (2008). Hitler: A Biography. New York City: W. W. Norton & Company. ISBN 978-0-393-06757-6. LCCN 2008037294. OCLC 1285564274. OL 22551194M. Wikidata Q138306767.
- Kertzer, David I. (2014). The Pope and Mussolini: The Secret History of Pius XI and the Rise of Fascism in Europe. Oxford University Press. ISBN 978-0-19-871616-7.
- Manners, John (2002). The Oxford History of Christianity. Oxford: Oxford University Press. ISBN 978-0-19-280336-8.
- Marchione, Margherita (1997). Yours Is a Precious Witness: Memoirs of Jews and Catholics in Wartime Italy. Mahwah, NJ: Paulist Press. ISBN 978-0-8091-0485-7.
- Morgan, Thomas B. (1937) A Reporter at the Papal Court – A Narrative of the Reign of Pope Pius XI, New York: Longmans, Green and Co.
- Shirer, William Lawrence (1960). The Rise and Fall of the Third Reich: A History of Nazi Germany. London: Secker & Warburg. Wikidata Q138049061.
- Wolf, Hubert (2010), Pope and Devil: The Vatican Archives and the Third Reich. Trans. Kenneth Kronenberg, Cambridge, MA and London, England: The Belknap Press of Harvard University Press.

=== Other languages ===
- Ceci, Lucia (2013), L'interesse superiore. Il Vaticano e l'Italia di Mussolini, Laterza, Roma-Bari
- Chiron, Yves (2004), Pie XI (1857–1939), Perrin, Paris, ISBN 2-262-01846-4.
- D'Orazi, Lucio (1989), Il Coraggio Della Verita Vita do Pio XI, Edizioni logos, Roma
- Ceci, Lucia (2010), "Il papa non-deve parlare. Chiesa, fascismo e guerra di Etiopia", Laterza, Roma-Bari
- Fontenelle, Mrg R (1939). Seine Heiligkeit Pius XI. Alsactia, France.
- Riasanovsky, Nicholas V. (1963). A History of Russia. New York: Oxford University Press.
- Schmidlin, Josef (1922–1939), Papstgeschichte, Vol I-IV, Köstel-Pusztet München
- Peter Rohrbacher (2012), "Völkerkunde und Afrikanistik für den Papst". Missionsexperten und der Vatikan 1922–1939 in: Römische Historische Mitteilungen 54: 583–610

Diplomatic posts
Preceded by Giovanni Francesco Compagnoni Marefoschi	Apostolic Nuncio to Poland; 3 July 1919 – 13 June 1921	Succeeded by Lorenzo Lauri
Catholic Church titles
Preceded by Biagio Pisani	— TITULAR — Titular Archbishop of Naupactus; 3 July 1919 – 19 April 1921	Succeeded by Federico Tedeschini
Preceded by Corradino Maria Cavriani	— TITULAR — Titular Archbishop of Adana; 19 April 1921 – 13 June 1921	Succeeded by Ermenegildo Pellegrinetti
Preceded by Andrea Ferrari	Archbishop of Milan; 13 June 1921 – 6 February 1922	Succeeded by Eugenio Tosi
Preceded by Giulio Tonti	Cardinal-Priest of Santi Silvestro e Martino ai Monti; 16 June 1921 – 6 February 1922	Succeeded by Eugenio Tosi
Preceded by Benedict XV	Pope; 6 February 1922 – 10 February 1939	Succeeded by Pius XII
Awards and achievements
Preceded by Carter Glass	Cover of Time Magazine; 16 June 1924	Succeeded by Hiram W. Evans
