= San Jacinto hot springs =

San Jacinto hot springs may refer to one of three sites in California, United States:

- Eden Hot Springs
- Gilman Hot Springs
- Soboba Hot Springs
