= Massacre Canyon (disambiguation) =

Massacre Canyon may refer to:

- Battle of Massacre Canyon, Nebraska, U.S. (1873)
- Massacre Canyon, 1954 film
- Massacre Canyon - Black Range, New Mexico, U.S.
- Cooke's Pass, a.k.a. Massacre Canyon - Cookes Range, New Mexico, U.S.
- Potrero Creek canyon, a.k.a. Massacre Canyon - Riverside County, California, U.S.
