= Massacre Canyon Inn =

Massacre Canyon Inn may refer to:

- Gilman Hot Springs (1963–1978)
- Gold Base (1978–present)
