= Gilman Hot Springs, California =

Unincorporated community in California, United States

Gilman Hot Springs
- Unincorporated community
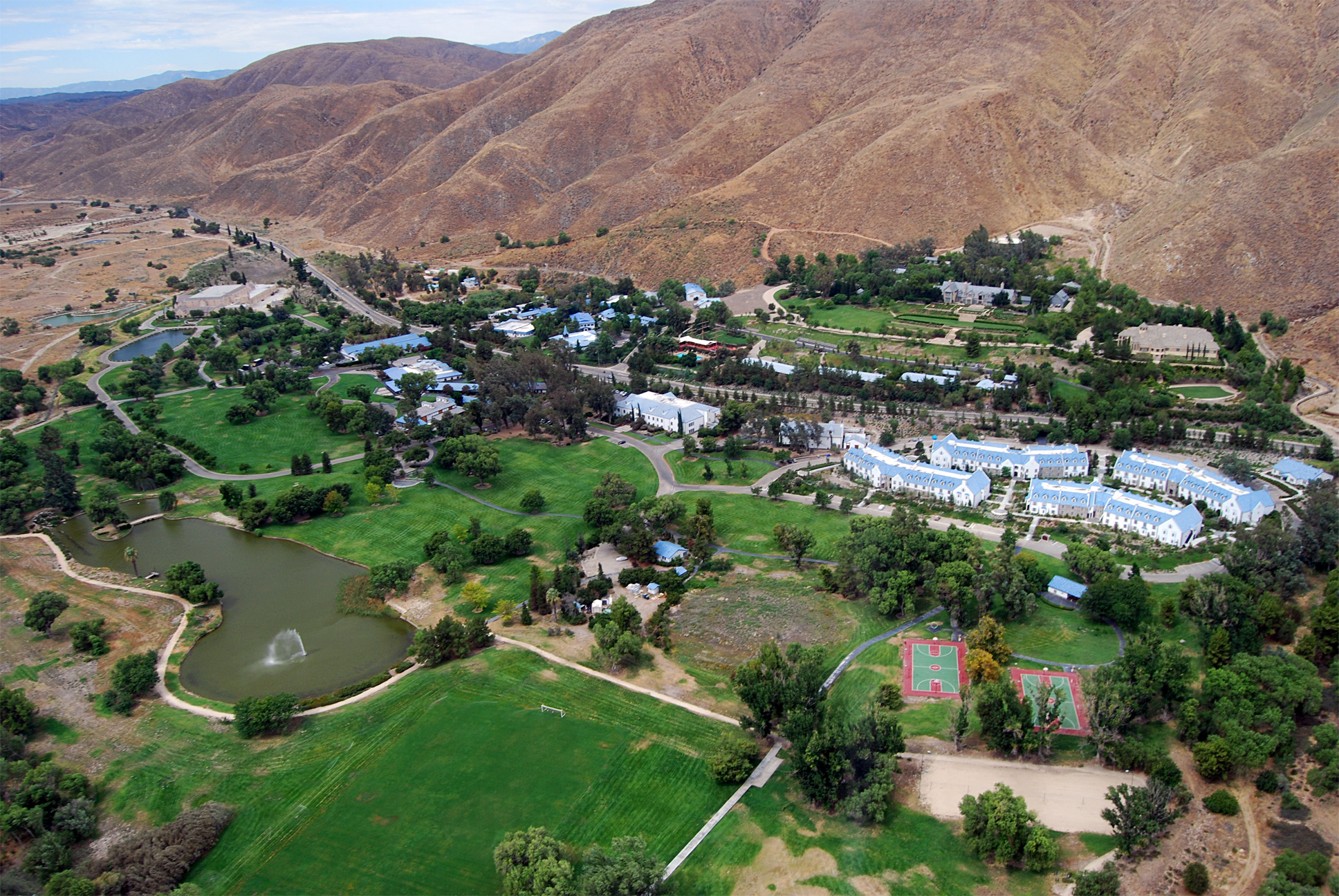
- Gold Base is located on the former site of the Gilman Hot Springs resort

- Location in California Gilman Hot Springs (the United States)
- Coordinates: 33.8335°N 116.9869°W
- County: Riverside County
- State: California
- Country: United States

Gilman Hot Springs is an unincorporated community in Riverside County, California. It lies along California State Route 79, adjacent to the San Jacinto campus of Mt. San Jacinto College.

== Geography ==
Potrero Creek exits Massacre Canyon and joins the San Jacinto River at Gilman Hot Springs, just above California State Route 79, with Potero Creek delivering a large amount of sediment that creates an alluvial fan as well as periodically contributing to the flooding of the roadway.

== History ==
Pre-settlement, it was the site of a village called Ivah that was occupied by what are now called the Soboba Band of Luiseño Indians. This village was depopulated by a smallpox epidemic "early in the 19th century".

Gilman Hot Springs was a hot springs resort from the late 1880s until 1978. The settlement's elevation of 1,525 feet (465 m) above sea level was beneficial for the boxers who trained at the Massacre Canyon Inn in the 1970s. Circa 1973, the Gilman family owned 500 acres occupied by "a major hotel and golf club, called Massacre Canyon Inn, and a 27-hole golf course...several motel and apartment complexes and a number of homes that are leased, a large bathhouse, the Gilman family home and a U.S. post office building."

The Church of Scientology's Gold Base complex is located in Gilman Hot Springs, California 92583.

== See also ==
- San Jacinto Wildlife Area
