= Soboba Hot Springs =

Geothermal site in California

- San Jacinto Lithia-Phosphate Springs; Soboba Lithia Springs; Ritchey Hot Springs; Soboda Hot Springs
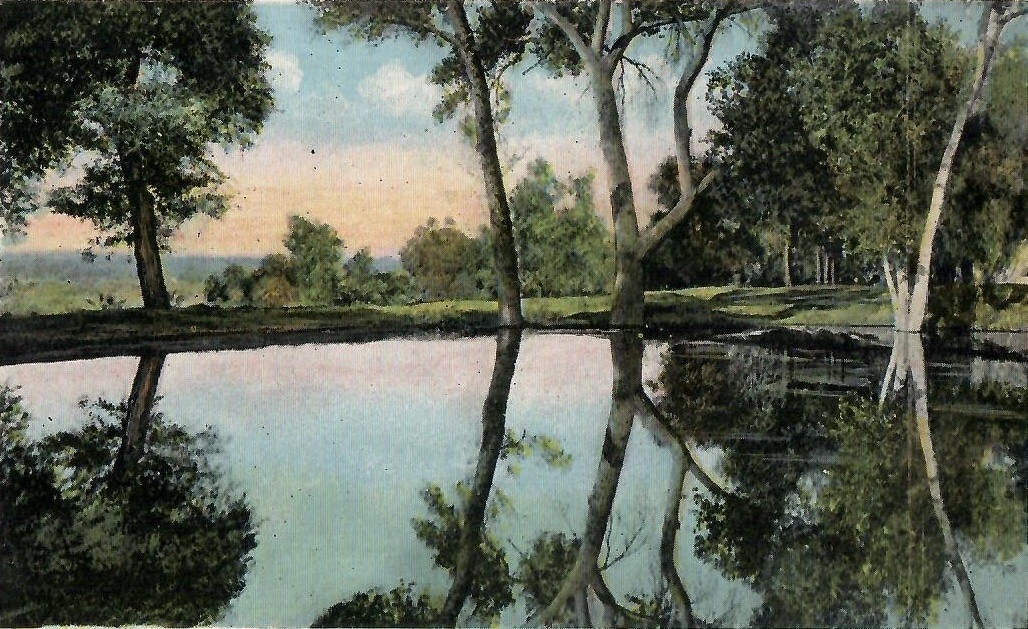
- Undated penny postcard depicting "Mirror Pool, Soboba Hot Springs, San Jacinto, Calif."
- Interactive map of Soboba Hot Springs
- Location: 2,200 feet (670 m)
- Coordinates: 33.800°N 116.927°W
- Type: geothermal
- Discharge: 95 liters/minute
- Temperature: 39 °C (102 °F)

Soboba Hot Springs are a historic hot springs and resort in Riverside County, California, United States. The springs issued from the side of a steep ravine "with narrow, precipitous sides, and the rock exposed is largely a crushed gneiss...the thermal character of the springs is due to crushing and slipping of the rocks". The Soboba Hot Springs resort was adjacent to the reservation of the Soboba Band of Luiseño Indians. Soboba means hot water in the Luiseño language.

Located along the San Jacinto Fault a little more than a mile from the city of San Jacinto and about five miles southeast of the Gilman Hot Springs, a resort based around the springs was first attempted in 1885. The resort closed in 1969, and the remaining buildings burned in a 1979 arson-ignited wildfire. Soboba Resort Casino, a Native American gaming hotel opened in 2019, is located close to where the springs resort once stood.

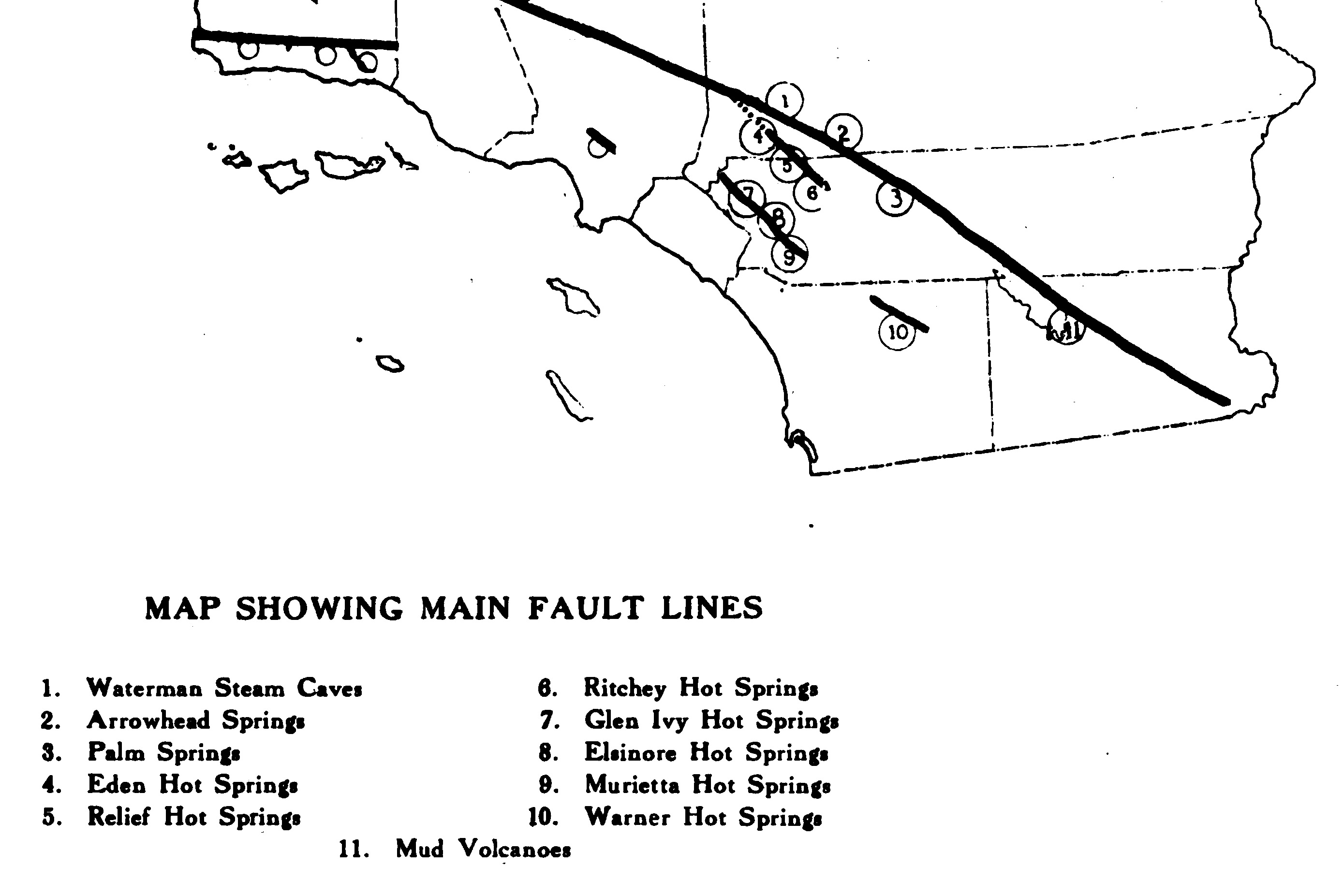
Geothermal features of San Bernardino, Riverside, Imperial, San Diego counties, with underlying fault lines, 1919

== History ==
=== Early history and Ritchey Hot Springs ===
There were apparently two sets of springs that were called Soboba: According to a 1912 history of Riverside, the local band of Luiseño people "owned not only the never-failing artesian spring that is still the property of the village, but also the sulphur springs on the north, now the health resort, Soboba Lithia Springs".

In 1887, boosters advertising real estate in San Jacinto promised that the area already had 82 artesian wells and two hot springs, likely a reference to some combination of Soboba, Relief Hot Springs, and Eden Hot Springs. In May 1888, the Los Angeles Times published an article on the commercial prospects of the San Jacinto basin and mentioned the hot springs: "Among the attractions may be mentioned three hot sulphur springs...I had the pleasure of inspecting the nearest one yesterday. The water is not at all disagreeable to the taste and its remedial qualities, especially for rheumatism, are said to be superior to those of Arrowhead. Comfortable rooms and good tubs are provided." In 1888, the hot springs were listed for sale: "THE FAMOUS HOT SPRINGS situated one mile north of the flourishing town of San Jacinto may be bought at a bargain. The history and reputation of these springs show that in curative properties and natural advantages they are unsurpassed by any in the State, and analysis by Prof. Doremus and other eastern chemists confirm popular belief. Elegant new bathhouse and cottage with large patronage; a splendid location for a hotel and sanitarium." A later feature on the springs stated, "...a company was formed about fifteen years ago to start a sanitarium...A small hotel was built, but was destroyed by fire soon afterward. Then came the collapse of the great Southern California real estate boom and the financial embarrassment of the principal stockholders in the sanitarium project". Col. John T. Ritchey, originally of Louisville, Kentucky, and later of Redlands, California, bought the 90 acres (36 ha) surrounding the springs, and a larger adjoining ranch, in about 1899.

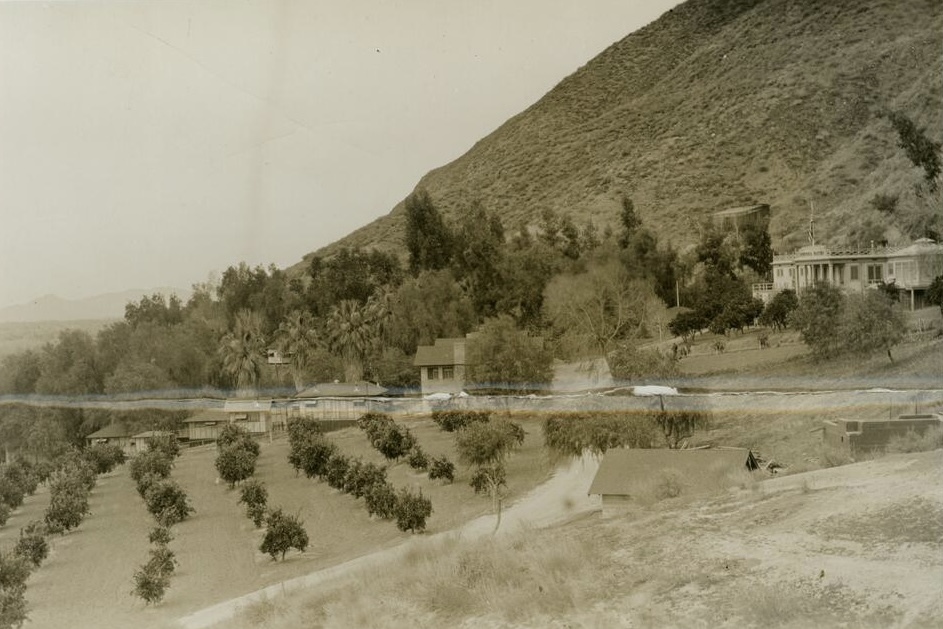
Mountainside orchard at Soboba Hot Springs c. 1900 (CHS/USC Libraries)

The Soboba springs water was being bottled for sale in 1904; ads promised "does not contain even a trace of lime. It cures kidney trouble. Costs 50¢ for five gallons". According to a U.S. government geologist in 1915, "Six springs, which range in temperature from 70 °F (21 °C) to 111 °F (44 °C), furnish water for domestic use and irrigation. Although in 1908 the place had not yet been opened as a public resort, a few guests were taken care of during the summer, and several tubs were provided for bathing. In a tunnel that has been driven into the hillside for a distance of 55 feet (17 m) a temperature of 82 °F (28 °C) was registered. This unusually high temperature has led to the use of the tunnel as a sweat chamber. Gypsum and efflorescent alum salts form on its walls and indicate that the tunnel water may be mineralized to a notable extent by acid constituents. There was formerly a sour spring in the ravine above the main group, but at the time the place was visited it either had been covered by a landslide or overgrown by vegetation. Water from one of the springs was formerly marketed as a table water, as Soboba Lithia Water. Its sale was discontinued when interrupted by the high-water stage of San Jacinto River in 1904, but it was placed on the local market again in 1909".

When Ritchey died in 1910, his obituary mentioned the Soboba Lithia Springs property, stating that "the rough, barren hillsides have been graded, terraced and set to oranges, grape fruit and other citrus fruits and the hot mineral springs furnish water for domestic purposes as well as for irrigation". A "syndicate" bought the springs and the surrounding 85 acres (34 ha) from the Ritchey estate in 1911. In 1912 a beverage-industry periodical reported that Soboba water, which was "under new management", was bottled for sale at a plant in Hemet. A "series of owners" ran the resort in the years between Ritchey's death and when John and Tillie Althouse took over in 1919.

=== Althouse era to 1979 ===
By 1922, the springs resort appeared in tourist brochures as Soboba Mineral Hot Springs, which were "in the foothills of the San Jacinto Mountains amidst orange groves. Bathhouse modern in all equipments. Accommodations include two-room cottages of hollow tile with private bathrooms. Rates, American plan, $4.00 and up per day; $22.50 and up per week. For diversion there is riding, swimming, croquet, hiking, hunting, motoring and dancing. Privileges of golf links and tennis court. For reservations and folder address John G. Althouse, Owner, San Jacinto, Cal." In the 1920s the resort added a miniature golf course, and what was called the "Indian village" and intended to turn the resort's proximity to the Soboba reservation into a marketing hook. Designed by Robert Stacy-Judd, the stylized cottages "combined his vast interest in Native American, Mexican, and Central American cultures with an Americanized version of different types of dwelling units. The cultural appropriation of native housing styles created a 'village' of native peoples who did not inhabit the same locations". The cottages had names like Pima, Yuma, and Siwash (a word from Chinook Jargon). According to one travel guide, "Even the hinges on the doors bear the stamp of the American Indian motif, and this is carried out in the furniture, draperies, rugs, lighting, fixtures, and all interior design. The suites in the Indian Village are comfortable and well-ventilated and have the advantage of being cool in summer and warm in winter".

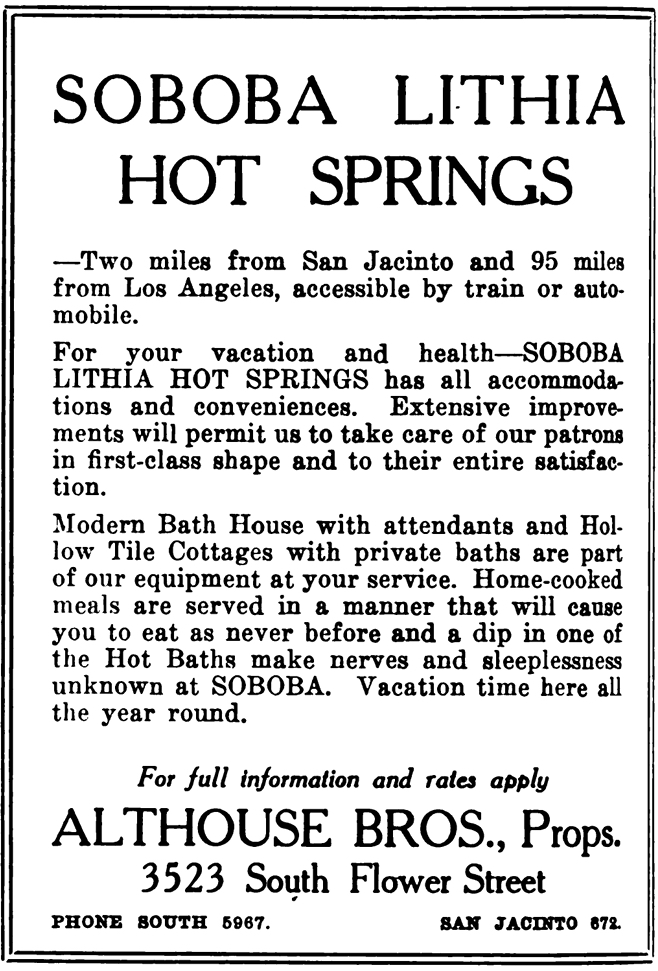
Soboba Lithia Hot Springs advertisement (1920)

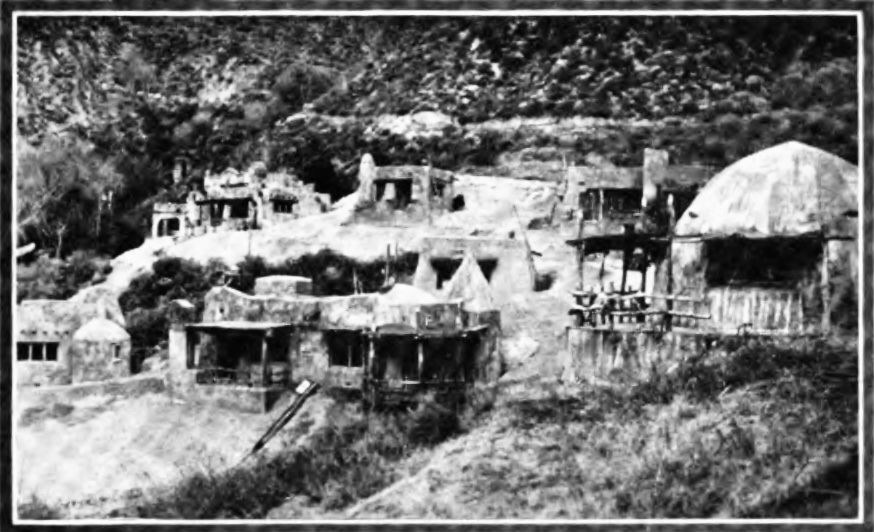
Soboba resort "Indian village" (1927)

As of 1931, Soboba Hot Mineral Springs were said to be "considerably more expensive" than nearby Gilman Hot Springs, albeit with no more than a fourth of the capacity.

It is a place where the music of tumbling streams always is in your ears, where wild grapevines form canopies over the trails, where every cabin has distinction and beauty and most of them are built of hollow tile so that they are always cool. We are writing this on the veranda of a cabin Lon Chaney used to love, one which was reserved for him many times. We are high up the hillside, so that the view is almost like the view from a mountaintop. Yet we are not up too high to hear the rushing stream below. We are looking out over a broad expanse which Nat Goodwin, who used to love these springs, bought and intended to make the site of a beautiful residence. There's no telling what these springs meant to Nat. Every time he spent a week or two here he went away feeling ready for another marriage.

Other celebrity visitors of the 1930s and 1940s reportedly included W. C. Fields and "young Charlton Heston". The Althouses sold out in 1946. By the 1950s the grounds had become notably lush: "The constant water supply has encouraged the growth of a luxurious foliage over the grounds. Desert plants, cactus, cottonwoods, eucalyptus, pepper trees, palms, and citrus trees flourish beautifully forming a shady oasis." The Riverside Community Book of 1954 said, "Guests are accommodated in picturesque lodges with tile roofs and interior decorations of pottery...It is possible to enjoy all of the historic past in single rooms or cottages supplied with running water, steam heat, electric lights, and a cuisine to satisfy the most particular appetite".

Golf course developers bought the resort in 1968 and closed it in 1969, with plans to continue the golf and to build housing nearby. Circa 1979, the resort was being used as a Hare Krishna retreat. The North Mountain fire of June 26, 1979, believed to have been ignited by an arsonist, destroyed seven buildings and essentially razed what remained of the resort. Damages were estimated at US$500,000 (equivalent to $2,218,019 in 2025).

== Water profile ==
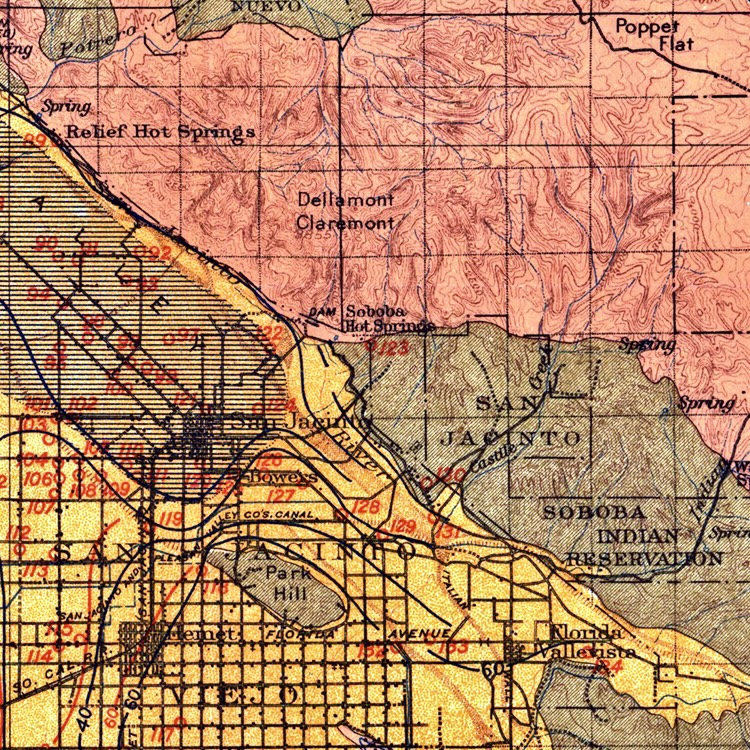
Map depicting Soboba Hot Springs, Relief Hot Springs, Soboba Reservation, San Jacinto, California (1917)

According to U.S. government geologist Gerald A. Waring in 1919, "Soboba Hot Springs, or Ritchey Hot Springs, about 5 miles (8.0 km) east of the San Jacinto springs, are also situated near the base of the mountains. Six springs furnish water that ranges in temperature from 70 °F (21 °C) to 111 °F (44 °C), and is used for domestic supply and to irrigate a small orchard and garden. The Soboba springs issue in a steep, narrow ravine whose precipitous walls consist largely of crushed gneiss. Recent landshde patches within the ravine also indicate that the rocks of the area are broken and disturbed and furnish local evidence that the high temperature of the spring waters is due to crushing and slipping of the rocks. Water from the spring highest on the hillside is shown by analysis...to be moderate in mineral content, but it is interesting because of its comparatively high content of silica—one-quarter of the total solids—and for nearly as great a proportion of normal carbonate. This high content of silica and carbonate, together with the large proportion of alkalies and very little calcium and magnesium, shows plainly that the water is derived from granitic rocks...analysis of water from another spring of the group shows it to be somewhat more concentrated. It is high in silica and bicarbonate, but carbonate is reported absent. Sodium is proportionately high, but calcium and magnesium are present in almost insignificant amounts".

In September 1979, a SDSU geological science master's student found only two springs at the location. She reported, "Heavy floods and mudslides of April, 1980, completely covered the lower spring (SOB-1). The first spring (SOB-1) is located in the ravine 75 meters northeast of the main building and has a very low flow rate. The surface water temperature was 36 °C (97 °F) and the spring contained H_{2}S gas. The second spring (SOB-2) is located approximately 25 meters further into the ravine, along a set of rough stairs. It had a surface water temperature of 38 °C (100 °F), no H_{2}S gas and a low flow rate. It was not possible to collect a nearby creek water sample for comparison since the San Jacinto river was dry."

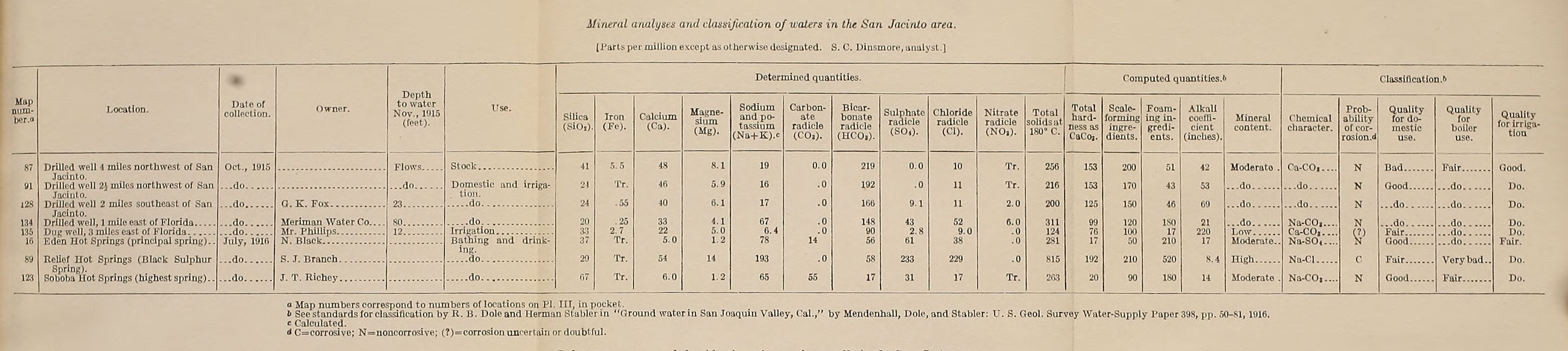
USGS mineral analysis and classification of waters in the San Jacinto Basin, 1917

== Additional images ==
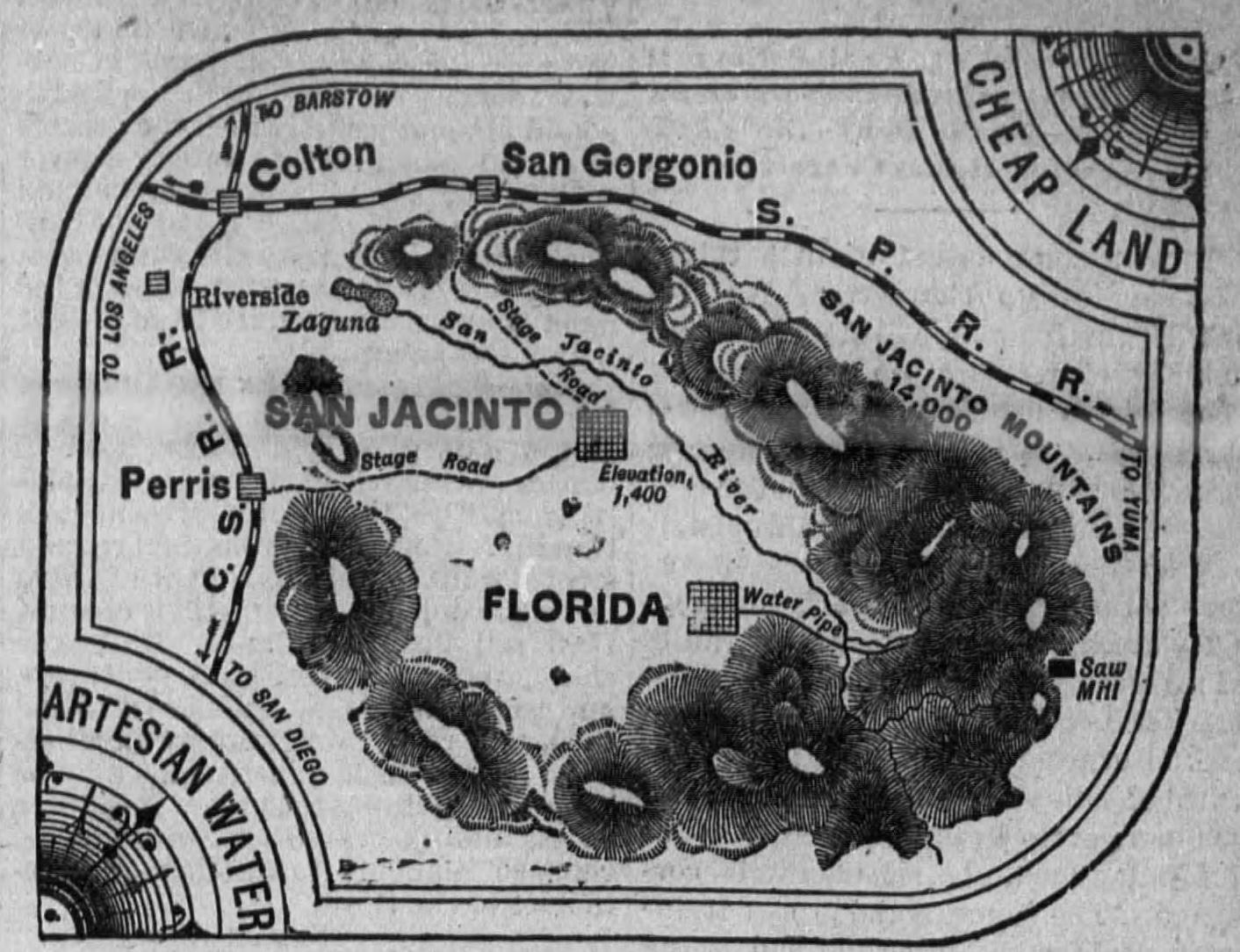
Artesian water and cheap land, San Jacinto Valley, 1887

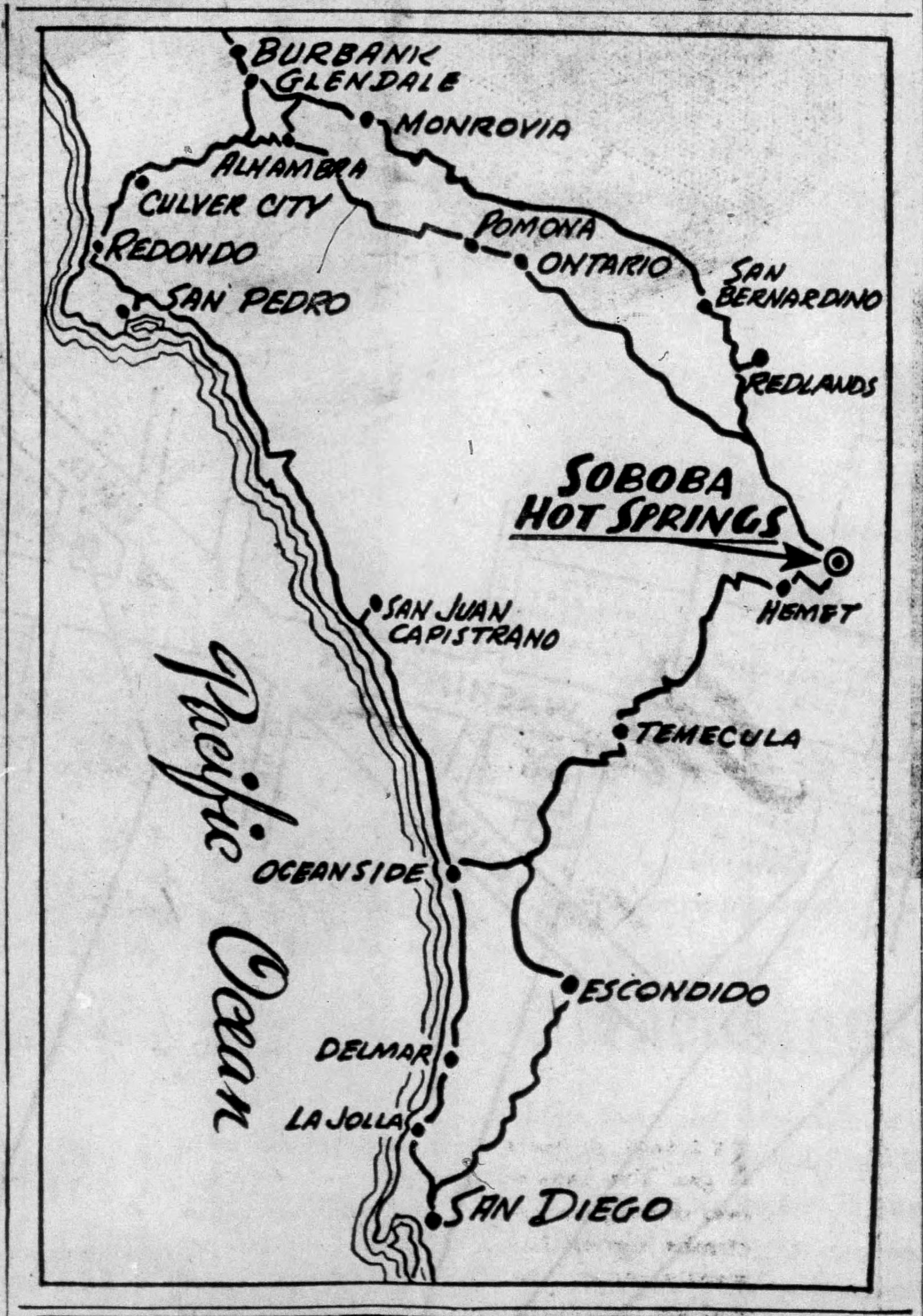
Automobile routes to Soboba Hot Springs, 1950

== See also ==
- List of hot springs in the United States § California
- List of casinos in California
- Santa Rosa and San Jacinto Mountains National Monument
- San Jacinto Wildlife Area
- Balneotherapy
