= Eden Hot Springs =

Geothermal site in California

- Canadian Springs; Rancho Grande
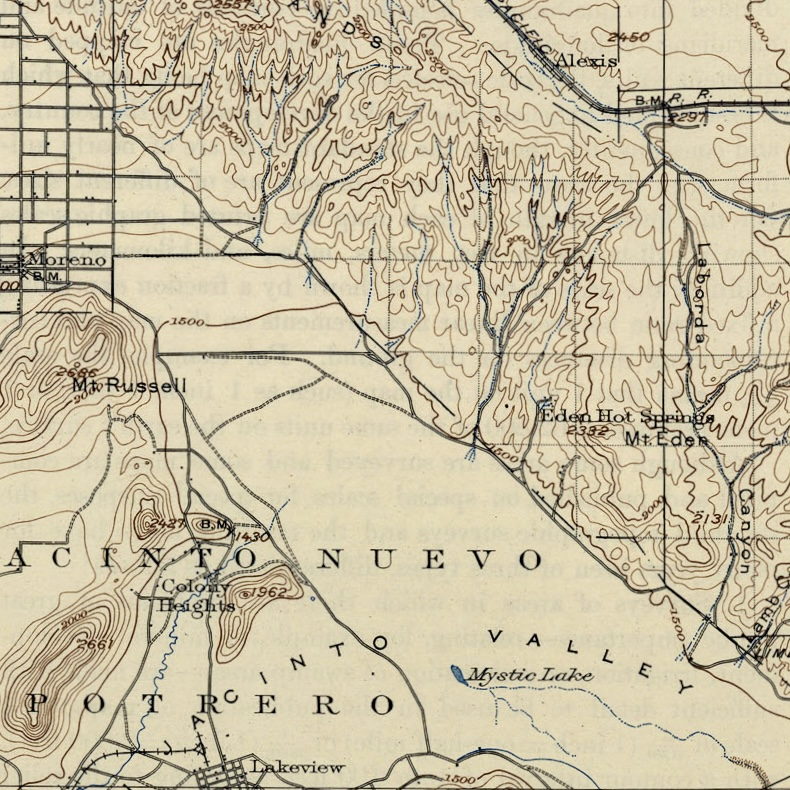
- Eden Hot Springs and San Jacinto mapped c. 1898
- Interactive map of Eden Hot Springs
- Coordinates: 33.896°N 117.057°W
- Elevation: 1,690 feet (520 m)
- Type: geothermal
- Discharge: 114 liters/minute
- Temperature: 43 °C (109 °F)

Eden Hot Springs was a historic hot springs and resort in Riverside County, California, United States.

== History ==
Before settlement, there was a village of Serrano people at what came to be called Eden Springs. One report states that "in little valley south of Eden Hot Springs and west of Mt. Eden [there were] three camps with midden deposits in addition to a mill. This location was probably used only during a limited portion of the year."

Eden, the northernmost of the three hot springs along the San Jacinto fault, had a resort as early as the 1890s. The entrance to the springs property was said to be located at the corner of the Joe Aigurrie ranch along San Jacinto highway and/or south of the so-called Jackrabbit Trail road. Eden Hot Springs was a historic hot springs and resort in Riverside County, California. In the early 1900s, it was owned by James B. Glover, a San Bernardino County supervisor known for developing roads and water resources. Glover's son-in-law, Frank A. Armstrong, managed the resort. . Circa 1904, "conveyances for Eden" left from the Star Grocery in Redlands every Wednesday and Saturday at 3 p.m. Picture postcards show that in the early 1900s there was a one-story hotel, cottages, changing rooms, and a bathhouse with an open outdoor "cistern".

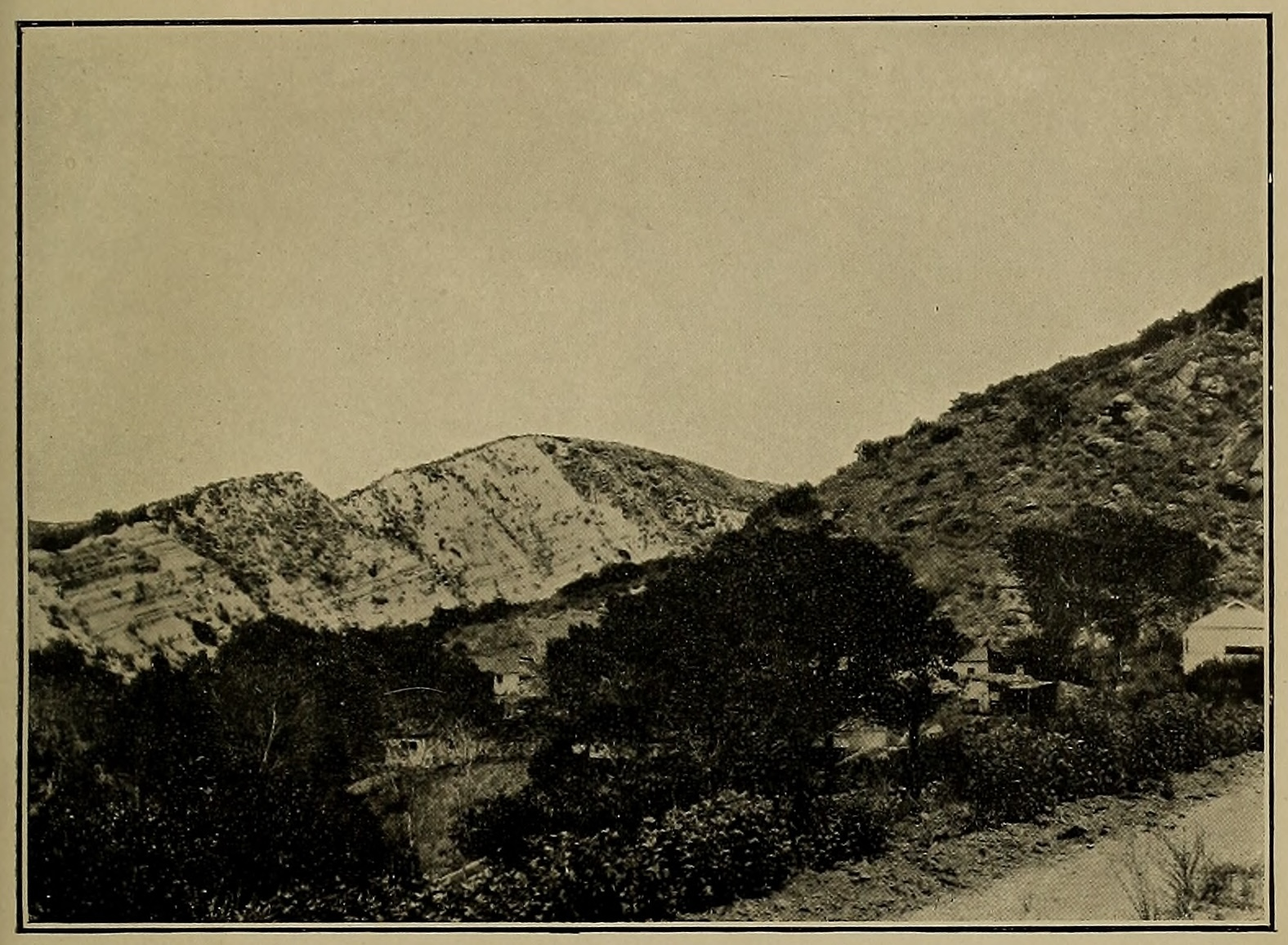
USGS photo of mountains near Eden Hot Springs

As of 1908, "cottages and tents provided accommodations for about 50 people, and a bathhouse and small swimming pool allowed use of the water for bathing". Bottled water from the springs was sold under the labels Iron Lithia and White Sulphur. In 1910, a newspaper reported "The property contains 640 acres of rolling foothill land, a large portion of which is tillable. The 30 or 40 mineral springs furnish a flow of 25 inches, which can be used for irrigation purposes. Already a small orchard of different varieties of deciduous fruits has been planted, as well as a vineyard. Among the improvements are a new pavilion, a large cement plunge, several bath houses, a number of new cottages, and a dining room". J. B. Glover died in 1921, and F. A. Armstrong took charge in 1922. In 1926, Frank and Virgie L. Armstrong sold the property to investors from Los Angeles.

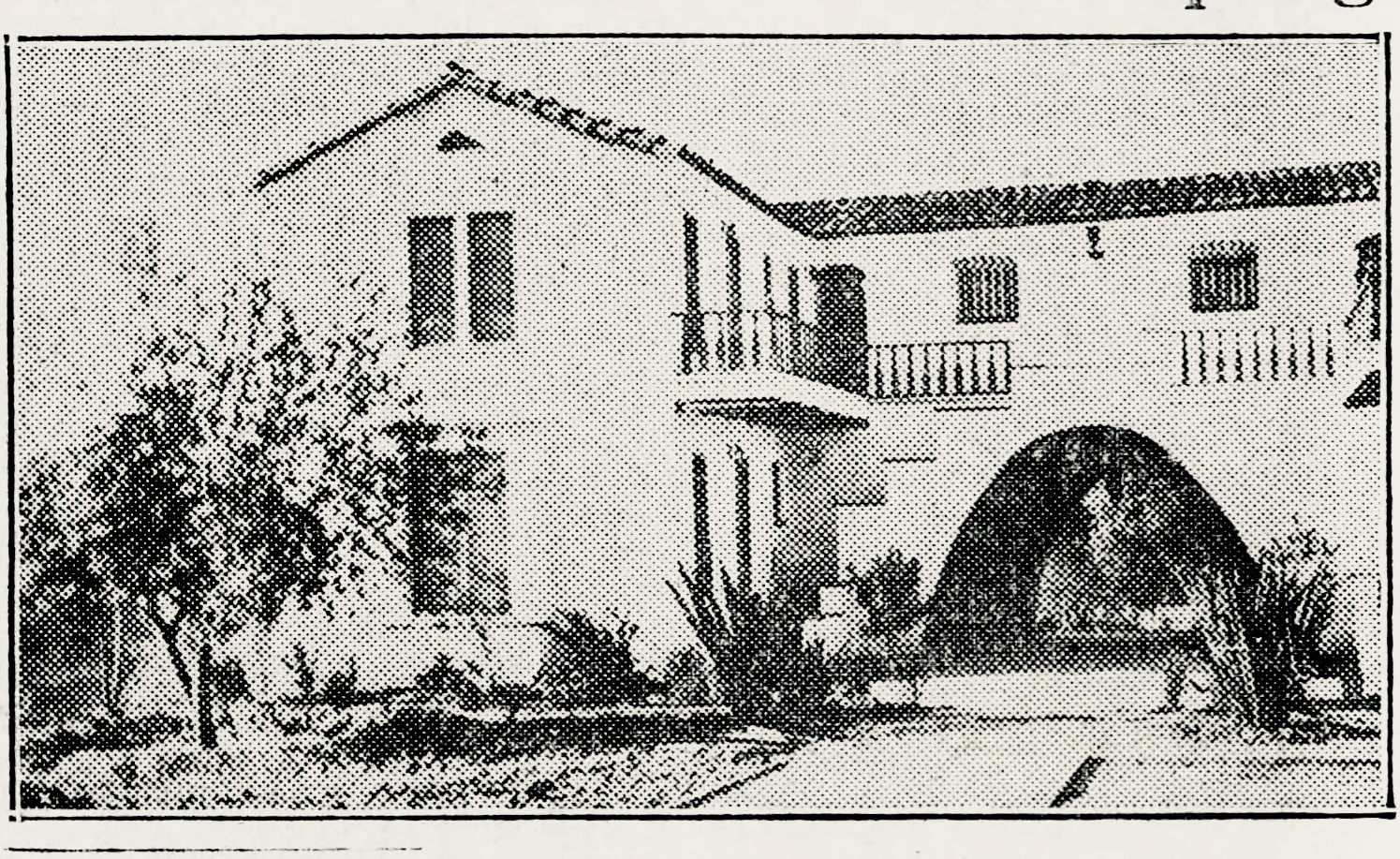
"New Guest House at Eden Hot Springs" designed by S. Charles Lee

In 1929, the investment group that had acquired the site commissioned California architect S. Charles Lee to design new resort facilities. Lee told an interviewer many years later, "We built a hotel and bungalows and all the appurtenances to a hot springs hotel". At that time, Lee used a private plane to travel to the dozen or so commissions he had in the Southland, including the fairly remote Eden Springs. The California Spanish Colonial Revival-style hotel was said to be set upon a "mesa" overlooking the canyon and the valley beyond. At that time, the site was said to have 23 "medicinal springs". However, the Great Depression was at hand, and according to one account, "during the 1930s all the hot springs in the San Jacinto valley dried up". The property changed hands several times, until eventually a man named Axel Springboard took it over and ran it somewhat successfully in the period immediately before and during World War II. The resort was rebranded Keith's Rancho and then Rancho Grande, and eventually closed in 1946.

When sold at auction in 1952, Eden Hot Springs was said to be 654 acres, with a "two-story main hotel with 14 suites, an adjoining building with 12 suites, a dining room and kitchen structure, a bathhouse, five cottages and a swimming pool". It was then renamed Canadian Springs and was used as a "weekend facility", eventually closing again in 1958.

Eden Springs was evacuated but saved from destruction during the 1975 Badlands fire, stood empty and was sold to new owners in 1977, and was destroyed in an arson fire in 1979.

=== Fossils ===
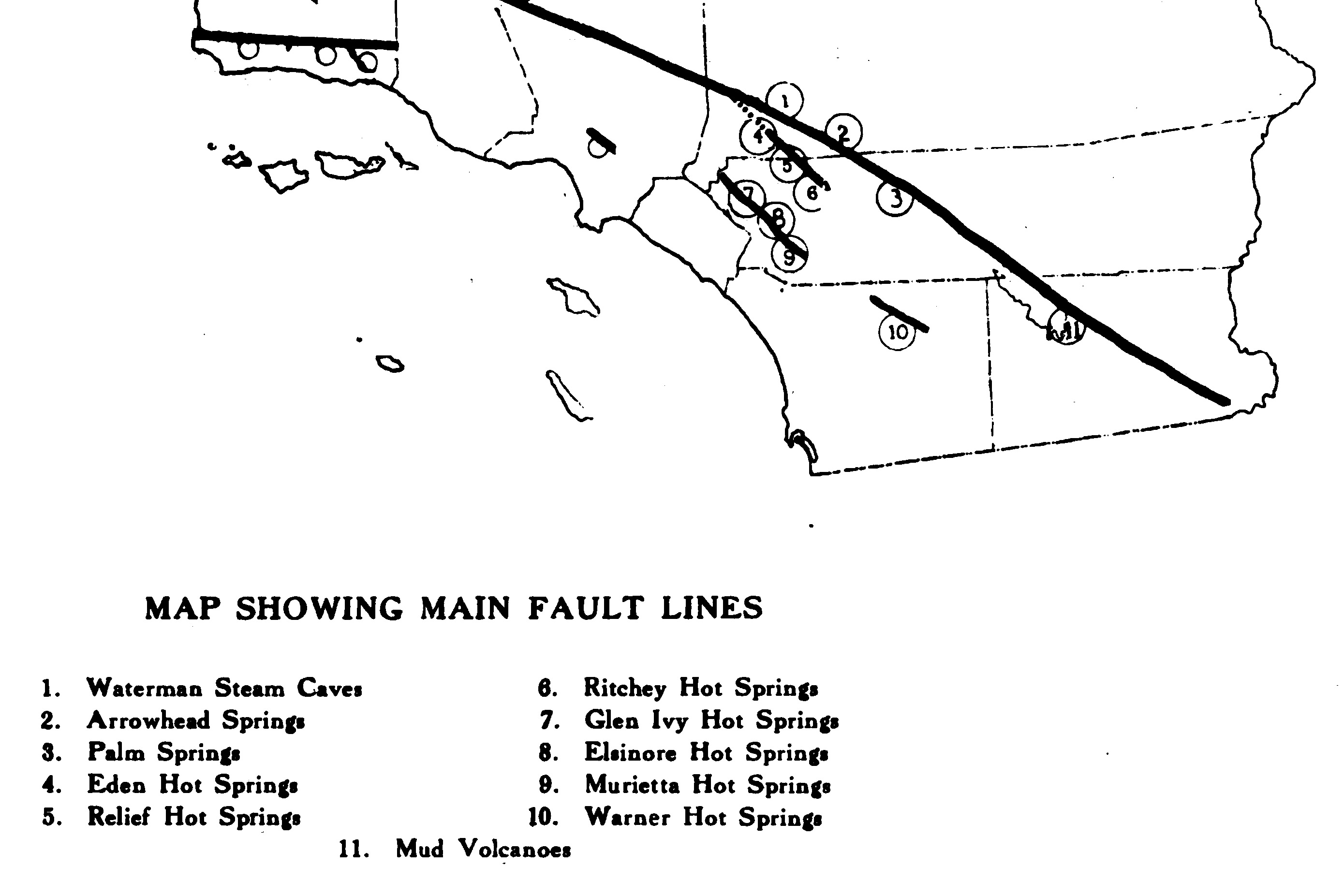
Springs of San Bernardino, Riverside, Imperial, San Diego counties, and underlying fault lines, mapped 1919

Eden Hot Springs resort was the only access route to a fossil find in San Timoteo Badlands, which was excavated under the sponsorship of Childs Frick from 1916 to 1921. Fossils found in the San Timoteo and Mt. Eden Formations included mastodons, ground sloths, a three-toed horse, a giraffe-camel, a very small camel, and a cave bear.

== Water profile ==
According to an U.S. government survey of California springs first published in 1915, "Eight small springs rise within a distance of 100 yards at the base of a steep granitic slope. The water issues less than 200 yards beyond the southeastern border of a series of shales and sandstones of Tertiary age, in which there are dislocations that were probably caused by the uplift of the San Jacinto Range; but the springs seem not to be related causally to the sediments. The maximum temperature of the water is about 110 °F (43 °C). It is moderately sulphureted but does not seem to be otherwise notably mineralized".

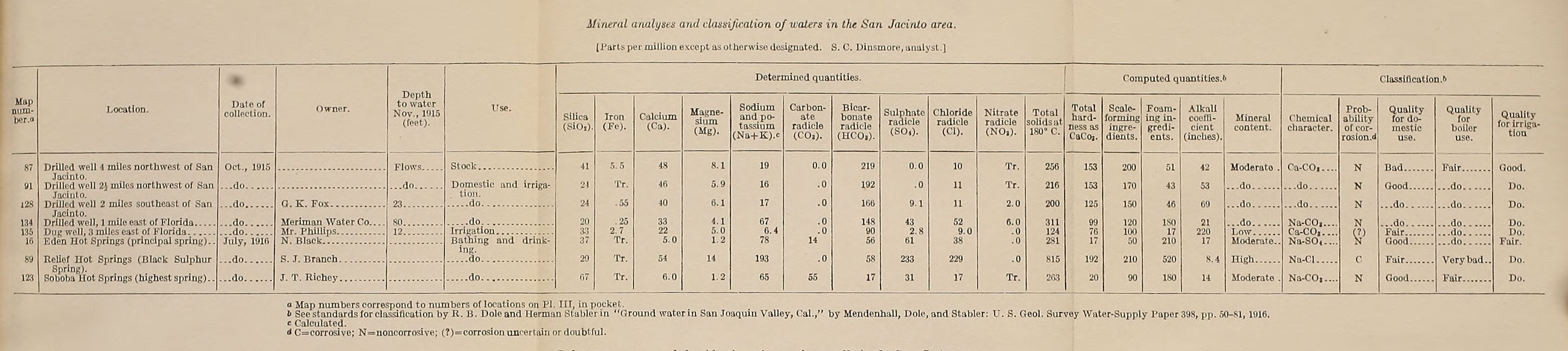
USGS mineral analysis and classification of waters in the San Jacinto Basin, 1917

== See also ==
- Gilman Hot Springs
- Soboba Hot Springs
- List of hot springs in the United States § California
- Santa Rosa and San Jacinto Mountains National Monument
- San Jacinto Wildlife Area
- Lake Perris State Recreation Area
