= Massacre Canyon (New Mexico) =

Massacre Canyon in the Black Range mountains of New Mexico was the location where on September 18, 1879, Navajo Scouts attached to Company B and Company E of the U.S. Ninth Cavalry, composed of African American troopers known as Buffalo soldiers were ambushed by Victorio, war chief of the Warm Springs Apaches, and about 60 of his warriors. The Navajo scouts and troopers were ambushed at the junction of the canyon through which Los Animas Creek flowed and a side canyon which subsequently came to be known as Massacre Canyon.

== See also ==
- Victorio's War
