= Gilman Hot Springs =

Thermal springs in California

- San Jacinto Hot Springs; Relief Springs; Relief Hot Mud Springs
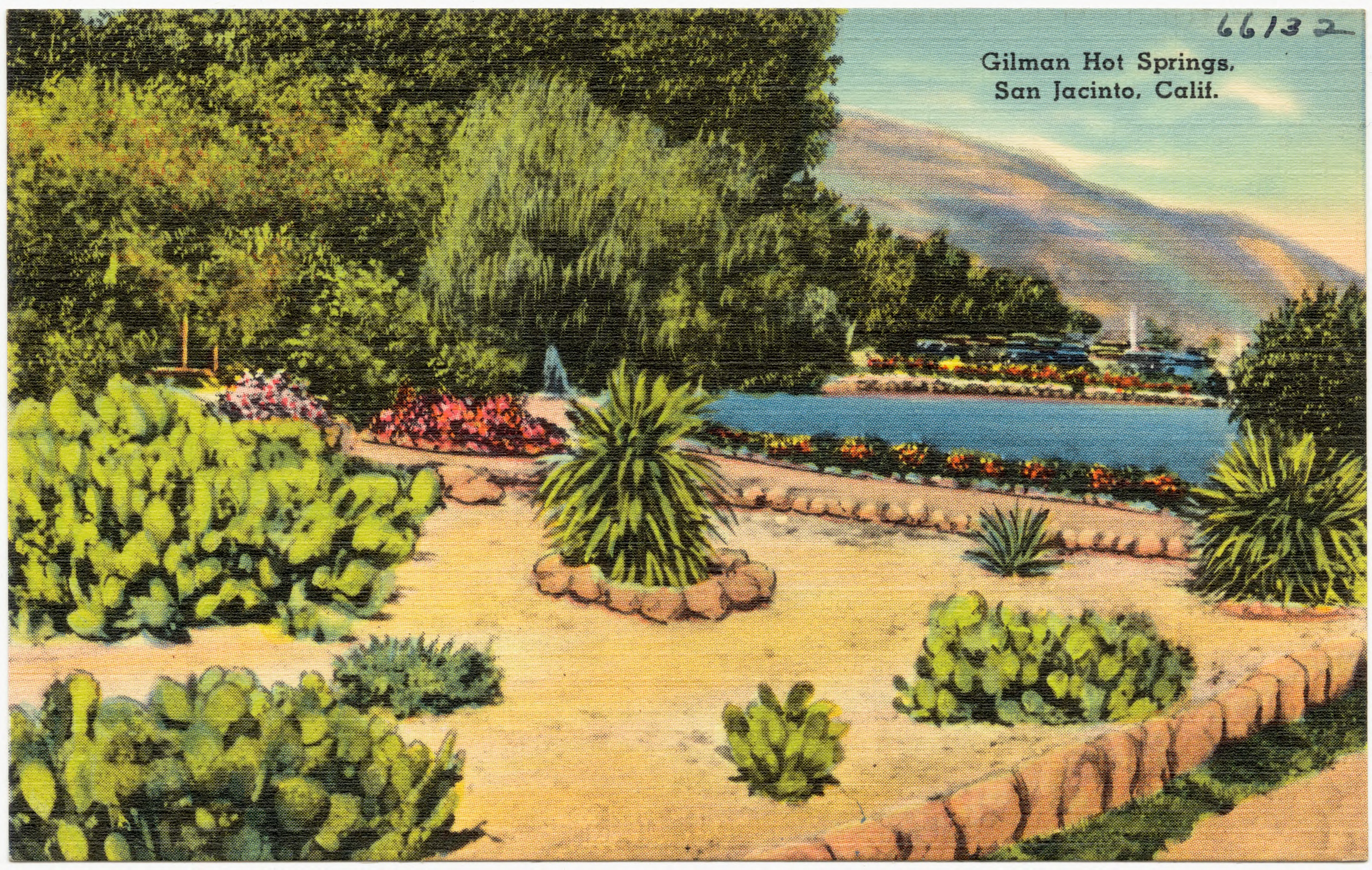
- Gilman's Hot Springs, San Jacinto, California
- Interactive map of Gilman Hot Springs
- Location: Gilman Hot Springs, California, near San Jacinto
- Coordinates: 33.8335°N 116.9869°W
- Elevation: 1,480 ft (450 m)
- Type: geothermal
- Discharge: 76 liters/minute
- Temperature: 47 °C (117 °F)

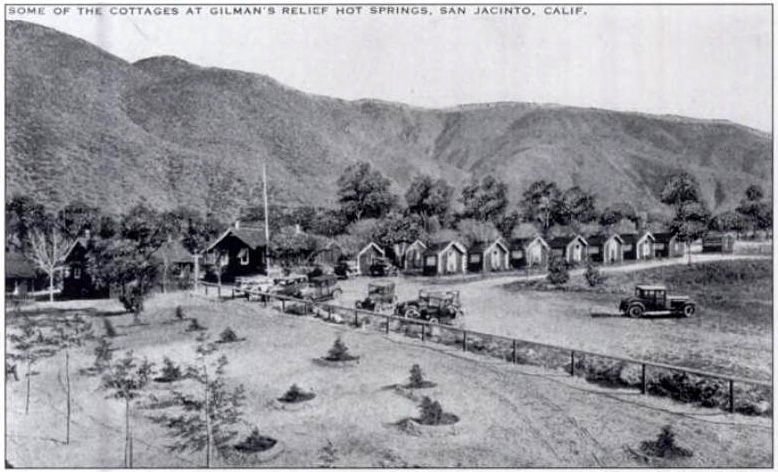
Cottages at Gilman's Relief Hot Springs in 1920

Gilman Hot Springs, also known as San Jacinto Hot Springs or the Relief Springs, is a hot spring system in the Inland Empire area of Southern California. Located near Potrero Creek, the San Jacinto River, and California State Route 79, the springs system consists of "about half a dozen" springs named for the Mexican land grant Rancho San Jacinto Viejo.

The springs emerge from a granitic alluvium formation that formed a marsh area. Gilman Hot Springs, along with Eden Hot Springs and Soboba Hot Springs, was one of a cluster of geothermally heated water sources along a fault line at the western base of the San Jacinto Mountains.

== History ==
According to one account, "Indians" used the springs to clean off sheep prior to shearing. According to another, the Cahuilla peoples slept in the springs in winter, up to their necks, to keep warm at night. The Branch family began homesteading the property, partially acquired from the Southern Pacific railroad, in 1880 or 1881. Beginning in 1888, Sidney Branch of Riverside developed the springs and built the Relief Springs Hotel there. In 1895 the Los Angeles Times described the retreat as having three springs: the main sulphur spring was 120 °F (49 °C), the mud spring was 114 °F (46 °C), and a secondary water spring was 112 °F (44 °C). The springs resort could be reached via the Beaumont station of the Southern Pacific line, and then via an omnibus the remaining 8 miles (13 km) to the springs. In the 1890s, it was sometimes advertised as Relief Hot Mud Springs.

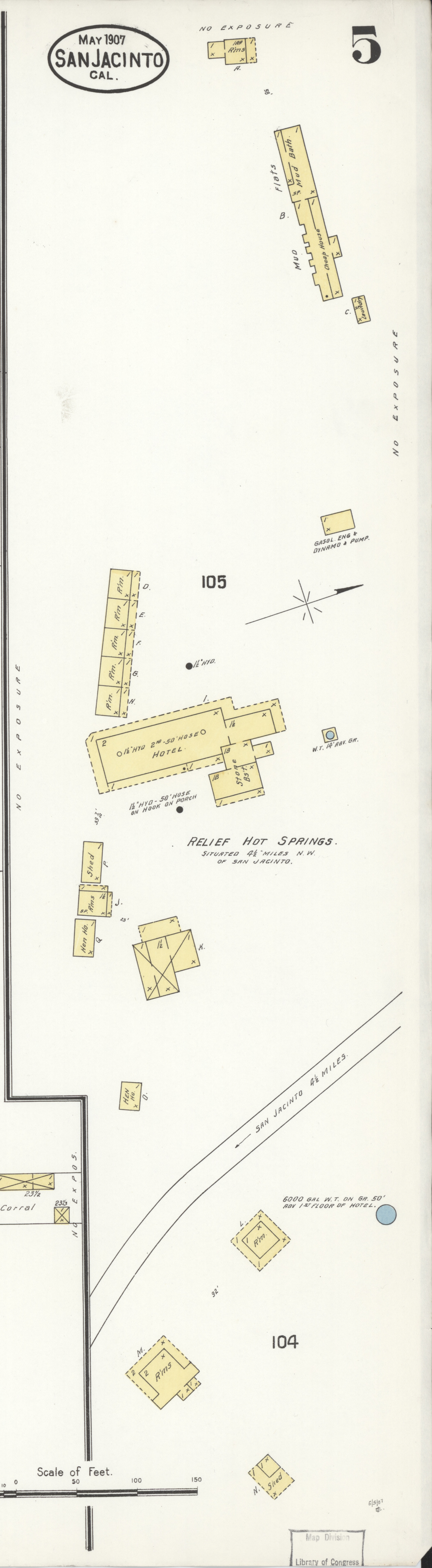
Sanborn map of Relief Hot Springs, 1907

In 1913, the property was sold for $53,000 ($1,231,135 today) to three brothers: William Earl Gilman (and his wife Josephine), Grant Gilman, and Forest Gilman. They were natives of Topeka, Kansas, and William E. Gilman had previously owned a hotel in Ocean Park that had burned in 1912. The Gilmans changed the name to Gilman Relief Hot Springs and later to Gilman Hot Springs. The original hotel reportedly had just five rooms. Gilman Hot Springs was one of three hot springs resorts near San Jacinto that offered visitors mineral water baths, mud baths and the opportunity to drink the hot mineral waters bubbling up from the San Jacinto Fault, an offshoot of the San Andreas Fault.

In 1913 the Gilman brothers built a bathhouse and a spring-fed swimming pool was built the following year. Later, the pool was expanded to an Olympic size. The resort was said to have a "frame hotel and cottages and tents forming a little settlement in a grove adjacent to the springs. Besides the usual tub baths there are mud baths that use material from the tule marsh". In 1917 a U.S. government geologist reported: "At the Relief group six thermal springs issue from a bank of disintegrated granite, and considerable water also rises in an adjacent marshy area several acres in extent. The place has been a resort for more than 20 years, a frame hotel and cottages and tents forming a little settlement in a grove adjacent to the springs." A fire in the winter 1917 "razed all the original buildings and demolished all the initial improvements the Gilmans had made". The replacement hotel was built with "bricks and timbers salvaged from an old San Jacinto school building".

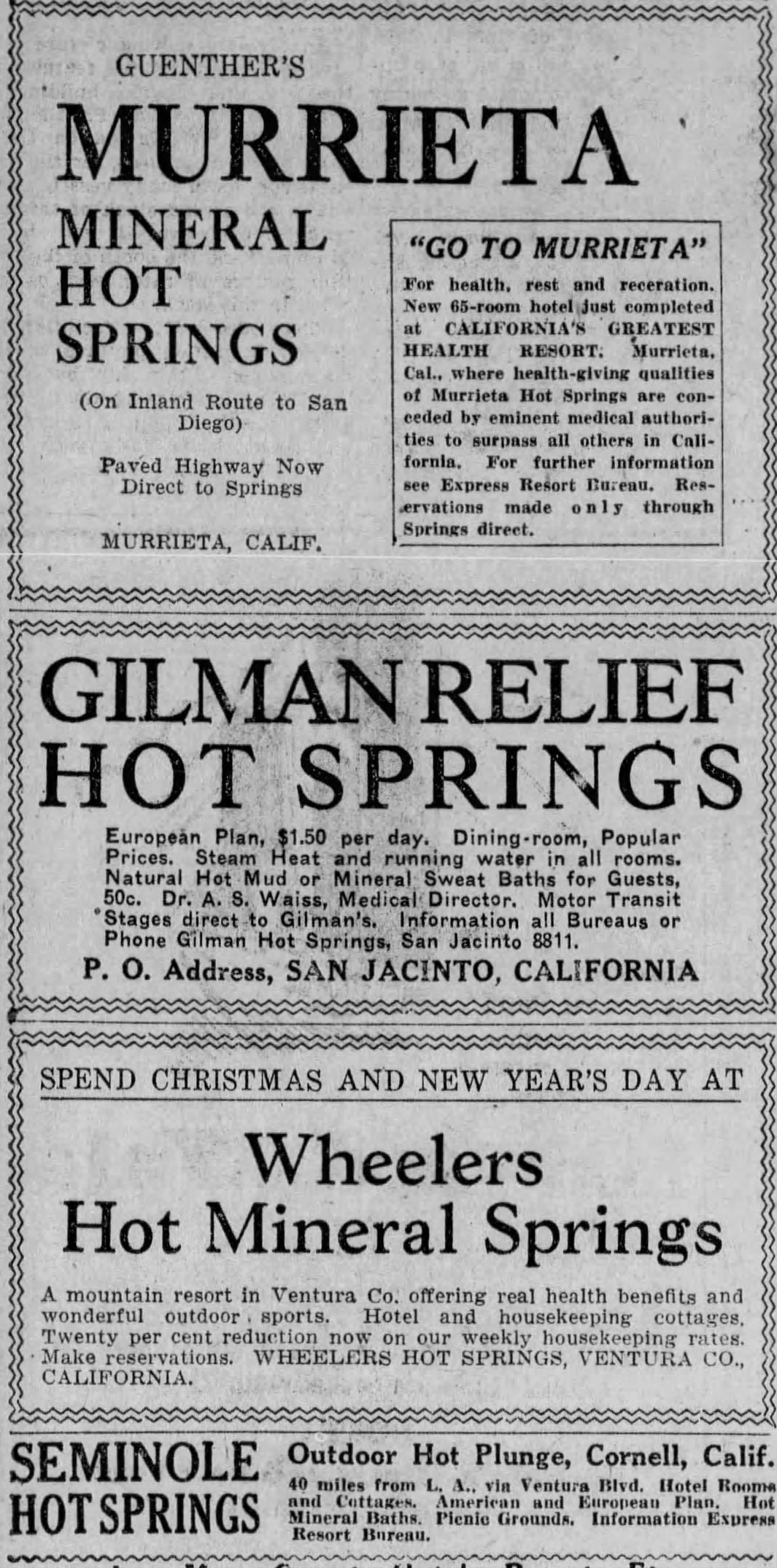
Stack of ads for SoCal spring resorts in the Los Angeles Evening Express, 1926: Guenther's Murrieta Mineral Hot Springs, Gilman Relief Hot Springs, Wheelers Hot Mineral Springs, and Seminole Hot Springs

Many visitors arrived by train via San Jacinto, where they were met by representatives of the hotel to be transported to the resort. In 1930, visitors could get to Gilman's Hot Springs by either taking the Pacific Electric to Riverside and there connecting with a Motor Transit stage, or by taking a Santa Fe Railway train to San Jacinto, where an auto stage would then ferry them to the springs resort. A San Bernardino newspaper columnist later recalled the early years of the resort: "As a youth I used to hunt quail and rabbits along the San Jacinto River and, of course, always retired to Gilman's, where even in those days, there was a lunch counter which did, as I remember, a thriving business. Then, sometime later, my father was a patient at the resort, taking the spring water and mud baths, for a rheumatic condition. I frequently visited him there. He occupied one of the one-room houses, a tiny place. In those days, nobody ever heard of golf, but the buggies and rigs of all types jammed the grounds of the springs."

The resort had its own golf course alongside the San Jacinto River. It was originally opened with nine holes in 1930; the course was later expanded to 27 holes before being destroyed in a flood. Other activities for visitors included hiking in the hills and walks within the resort. The resort had a dance hall, with weekly dances on Fridays accompanied by piano, violin and drums. A variety of events were held at the property such as beauty contests.

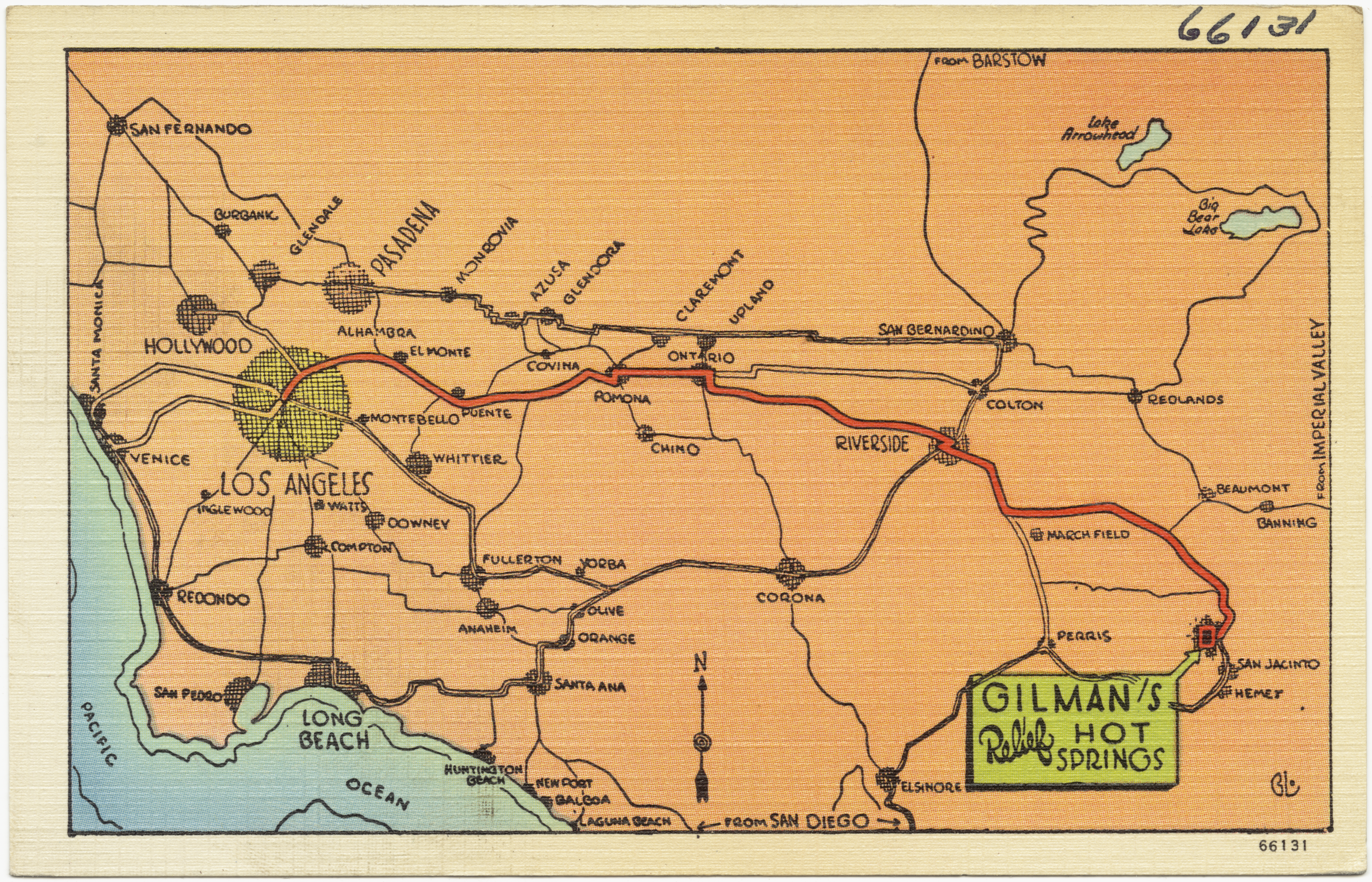
Route map to Gilman's Relief Hot Springs (Tichnor Bros. linen-era postcard, c. 1930–1945)

By 1940 there were 127 buildings on the property, accommodations for 400, horse stables, and tennis courts. The stable was later converted to a tavern. A service station and garage for use by visitors was added later that decade. In 1943, golf was 50¢ on weekdays, 75¢ on weekends and holidays, rooms cost $1.50 to $4 a night, and spa treatments including Roman mud baths and California tule mud baths. By the end of the 1950s, travel guides also promised "hiking, painting, badminton, horseshoes, ping pong, croquet, square dancing, modern dancing, motion pictures, and all sorts of planned activities and events for both youngsters and their parents". The Riverside Community Book of 1954 described it as a "moderately priced family resort". Guests during the resort's heyday reportedly included Joe DiMaggio and Marilyn Monroe, Sugar Ray Robinson, and an unidentified president of Ireland.

In 1963, William Earl Gilman II developed the nearby Massacre Canyon Inn, located on the south side of Gilman Springs Road, to accommodate dining and dancing. A training camp for boxers was also built in the grounds of the resort and was in use in the late 1960s. Among the boxers who used the facility were Muhammad Ali, Evander Holyfield, Sugar Ray Leonard, Ray Mancini, Armando Muniz, Rubén Navarro, Ken Norton and Jerry Quarry.

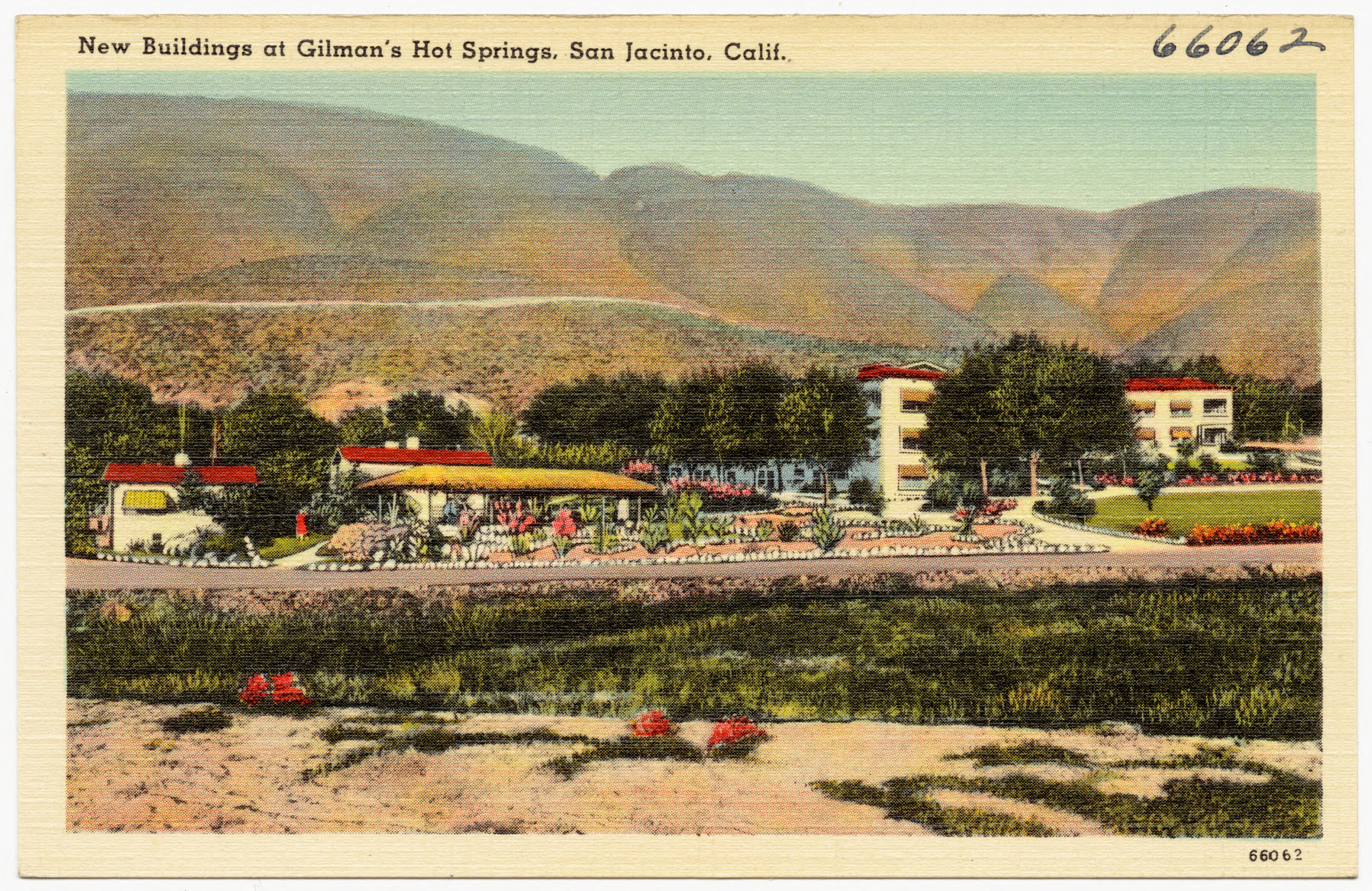
"New buildings at Gilman's Hot Springs, San Jacinto, Calif." (Tichnor Bros. c. 1930–1945)

The Gilmans attempted to sell out in 1971 for an estimated US$5,000,000 (equivalent to $39,749,384 in 2025). However, in 1973 the property was still in their hands. The resort had come to be known as the Massacre Canyon Inn, after the hotel built in 1963, in turn named for a nearby landmark canyon that connects to the Beaumont Badlands via Potrero Creek. After the resort went into bankruptcy in 1978 the property was acquired by the Church of Scientology for $2.78 million ($12,473,122 today). L. Ron Hubbard lived at the compound (called Gold Base) for a brief period prior to 1980. It is now a heavily guarded compound surrounded by high fences topped with razor wire and spikes, with a prison building nicknamed "The Hole", and is inaccessible to the public. The Church of Scientology demolished the Massacre Canyon Inn, the Gilman Garage, and the golf course to make way for new buildings. The nine-hole Golden Era golf course was located near the former Gilman Hot Springs circa 1997.

== Location ==
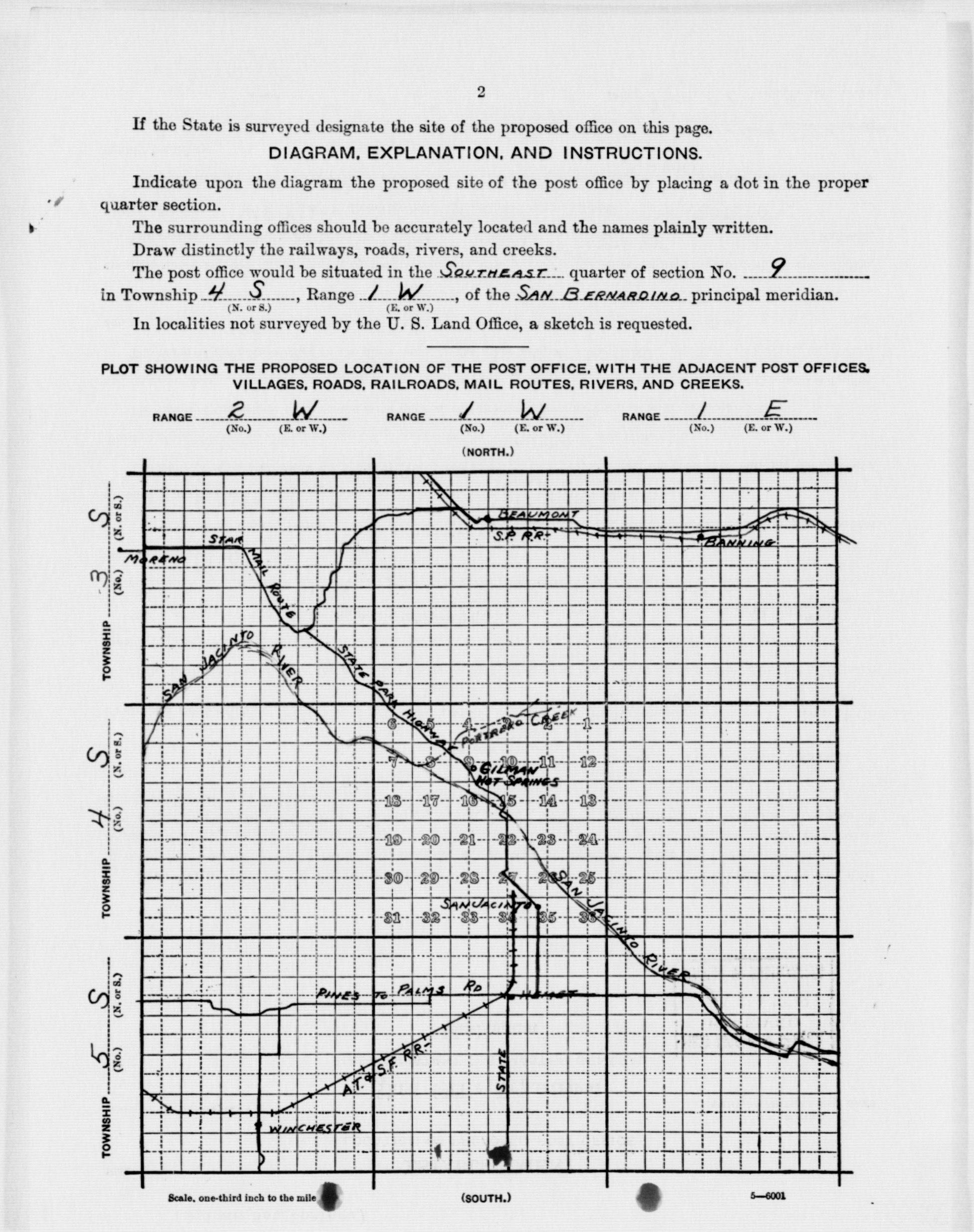
Gilman Hot Springs location map, submitted with post office application in 1937

The hot springs are located on California State Route 79, 4 miles (6.4 km) north-northwest of San Jacinto. In 1938, Gilman Hot Springs had a post office; currently its ZIP code is 92583, shared with San Jacinto. Josephine Gilman was postmaster from 1937 to 1942. Gilman Springs, Eden Springs, Soboda Springs, and Palm Springs all lay along the same seismic fault at the base of the San Jacinto Mountains in Riverside County, California. The Gilman Hot Springs were 6 miles (9.7 km) southeast of the Eden Springs.

== Water profile ==
The hot spring water emerges from the source at 117 °F (47 °C).

There were four main spring sources on the property: Black Sulphur, White Sulphur, Soda, and Lithia. It was claimed that drinking the water had health benefits. Advertisements in the 1920s called the hot springs "the ALL YEAR RESORT where the sick can be won back to health and where those in health can keep that way."

According to a U.S. government geologist the spring water is sulphureted with an alkaline taste. Efflorescent alkaline salts collect along the banks beside the springs, and the iron and sulphide contents in the water stained towels and enameled tubs. Per his detailed description of 1917, "An analysis of water from the spring that is used chiefly for bathing shows the general character of the waters from these springs, though they differ somewhat in taste and doubtless in the relative amounts of substances in solution. The water analyzed is rather highly mineralized and of the sodium-chloride type, though sulphate is an important constituent. Carbonate is absent and bicarbonate is remarkably low in amount."

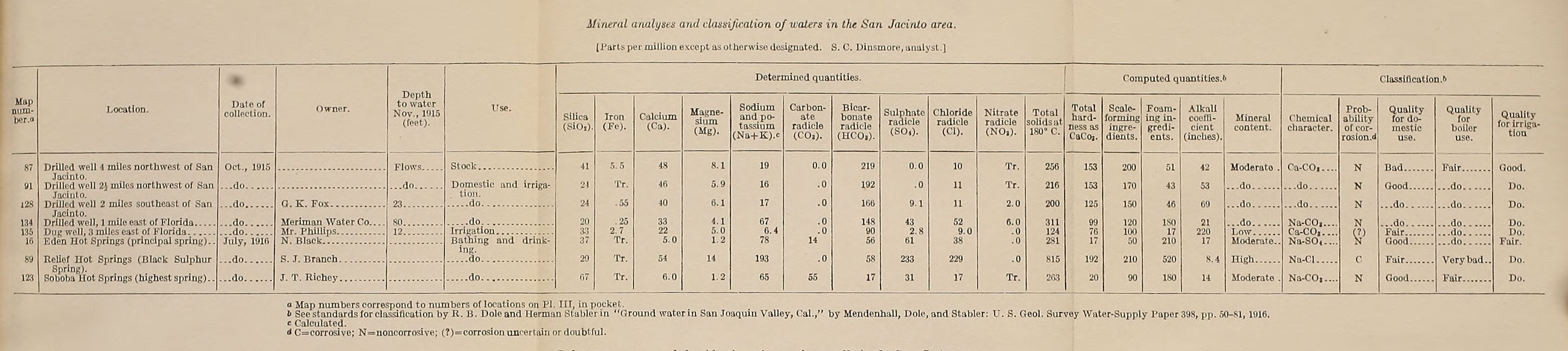
USGS mineral analysis and classification of waters in the San Jacinto Basin, 1917

== Gallery ==
Gilman Hot Springs resort
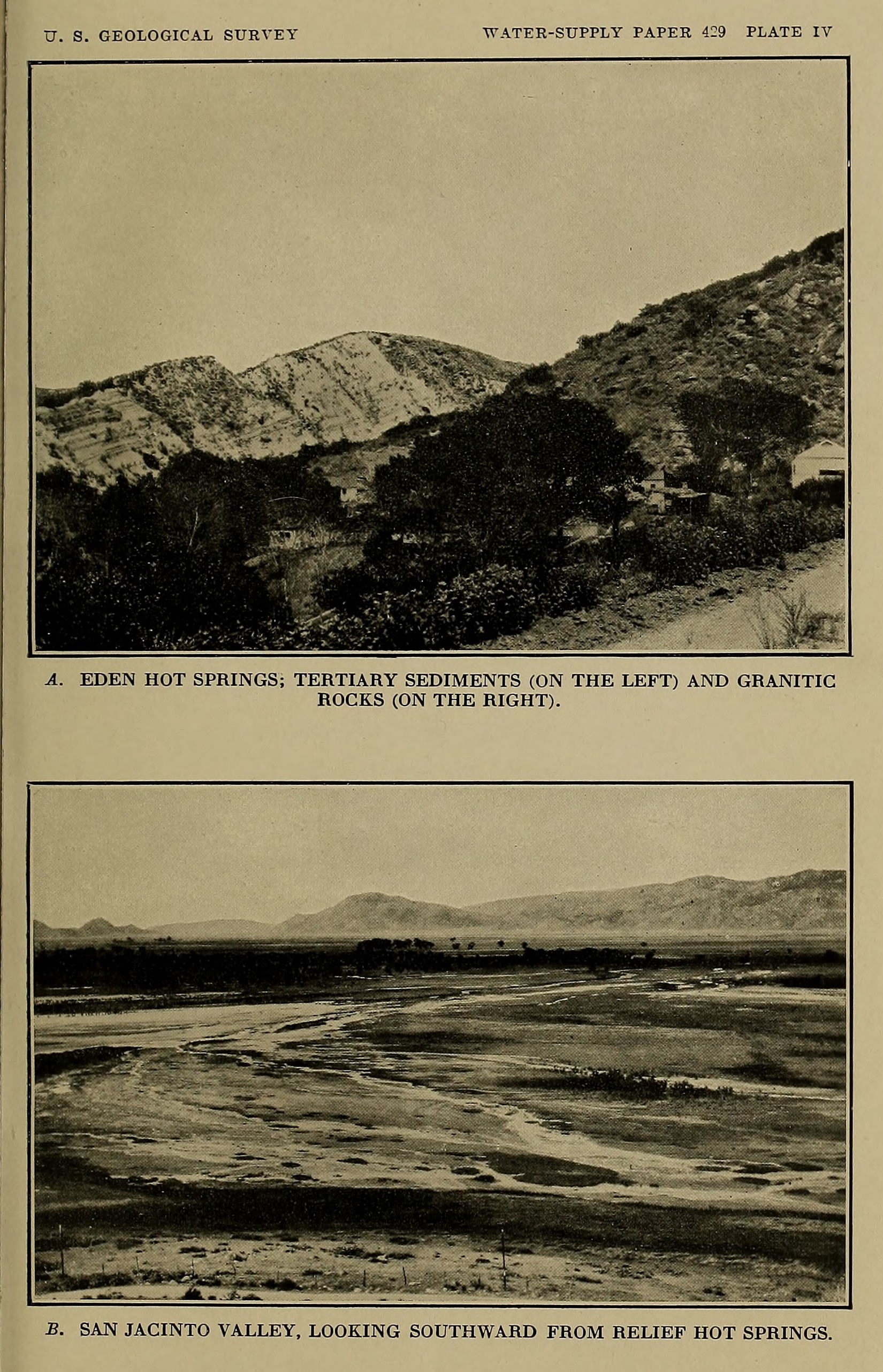
View toward Eden Springs and from San Jacinto Relief Springs, 1917

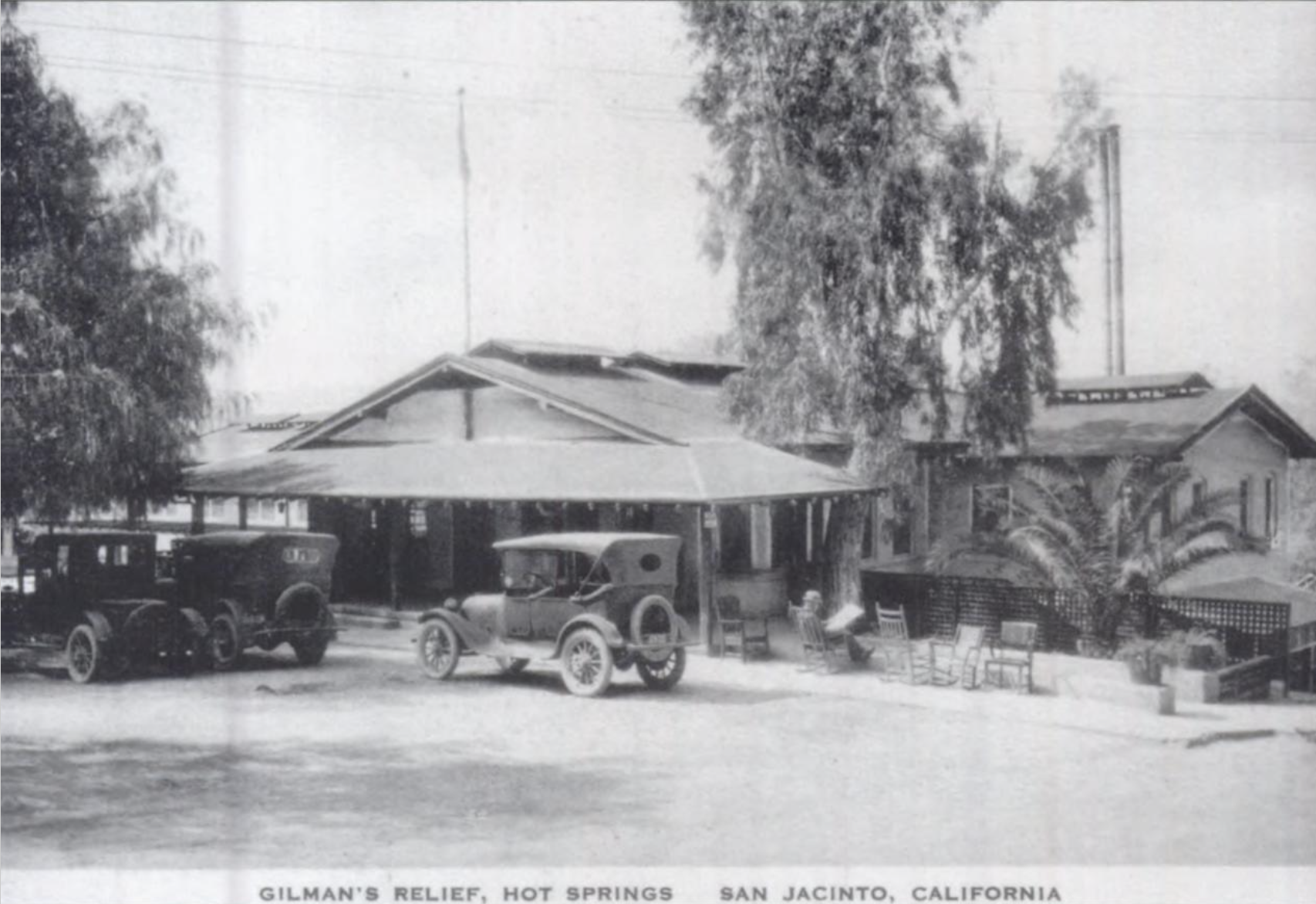
Gilman's Relief Hot Springs in the mid-1920s

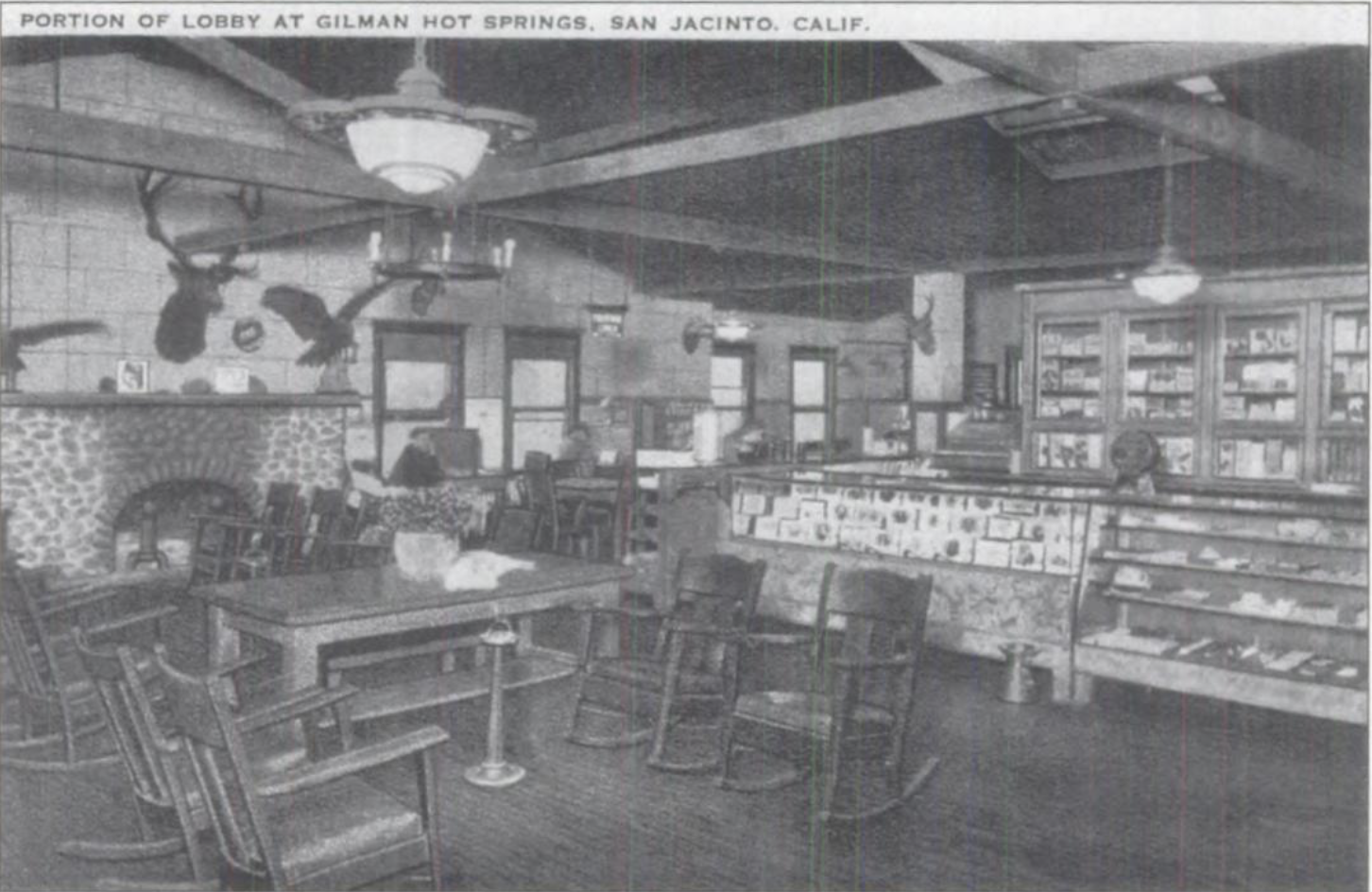
Lobby, Gilman Hot Springs Hotel in the mid-1920s

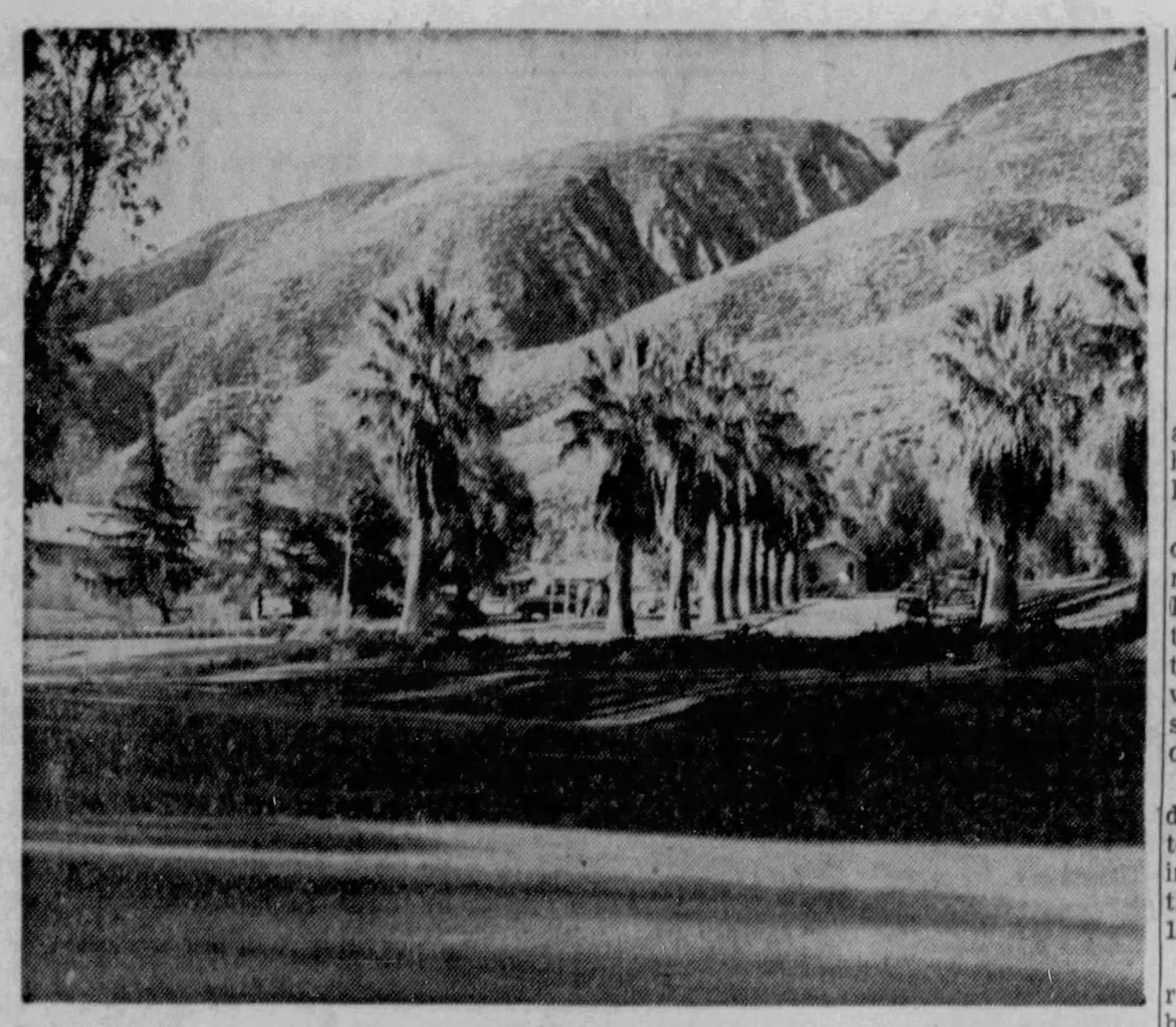
Exterior of Gilman Hot Springs resort in 1958

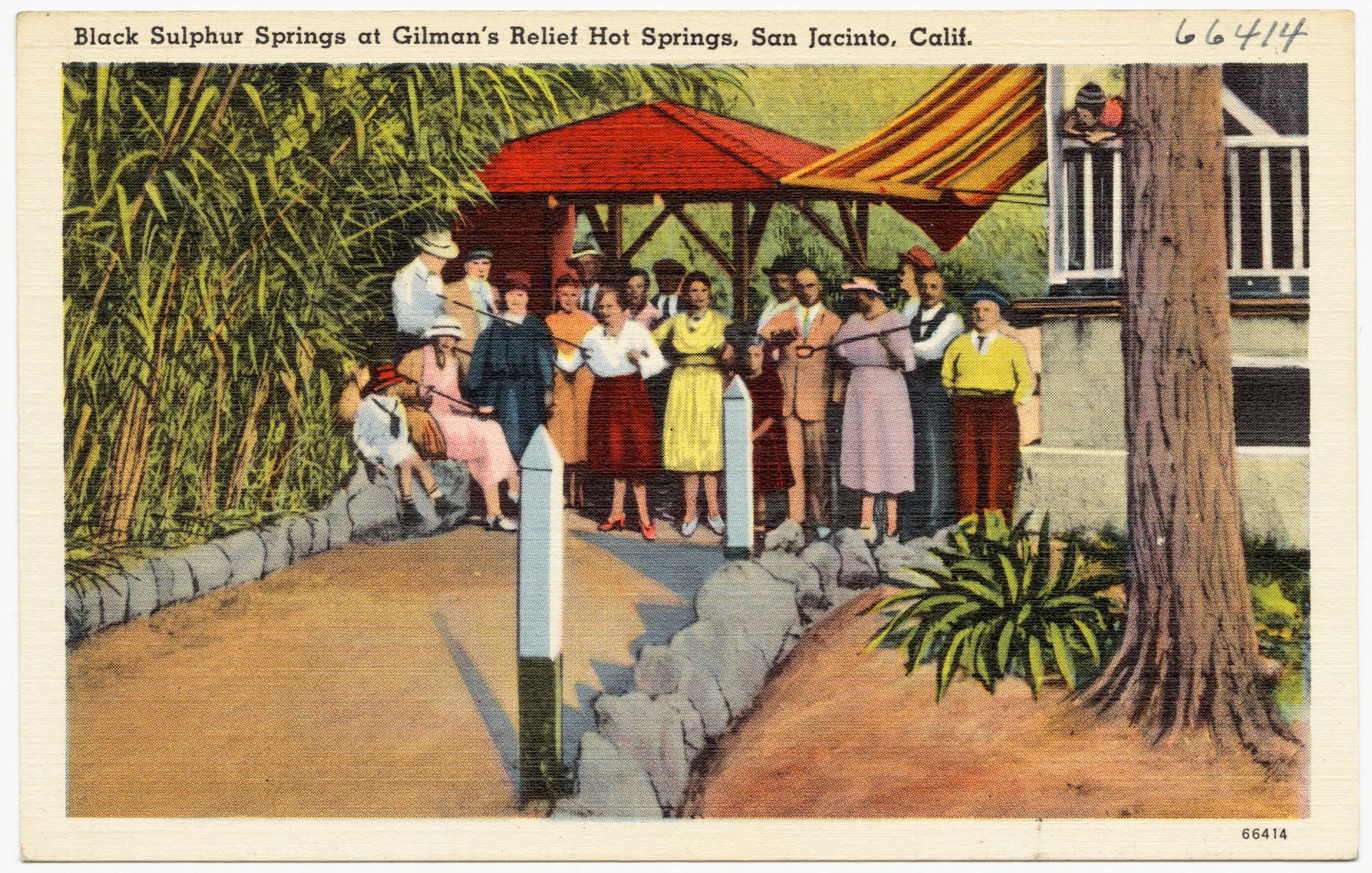
Black Sulphur Springs

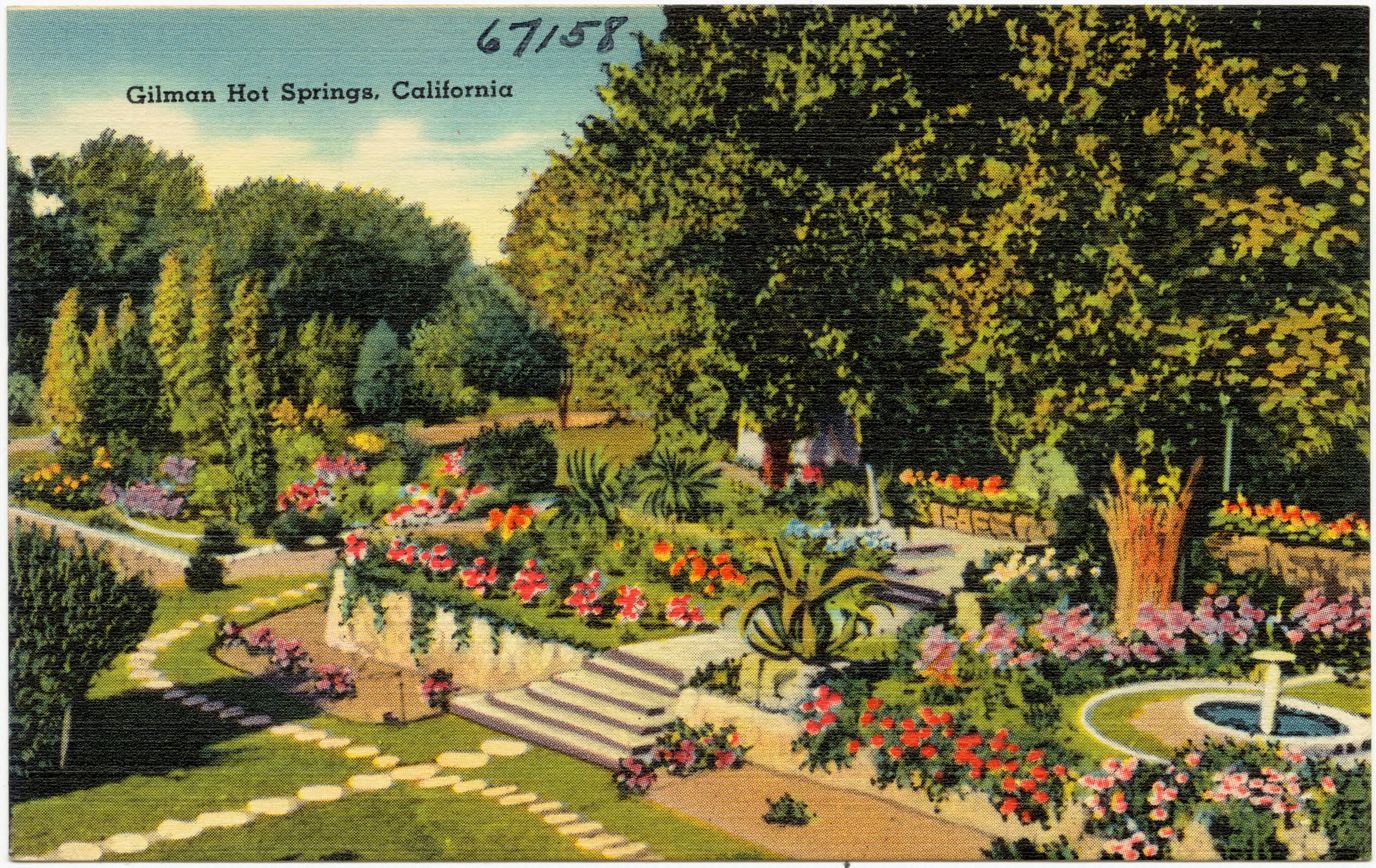
Gardens at Gilman Hot Springs

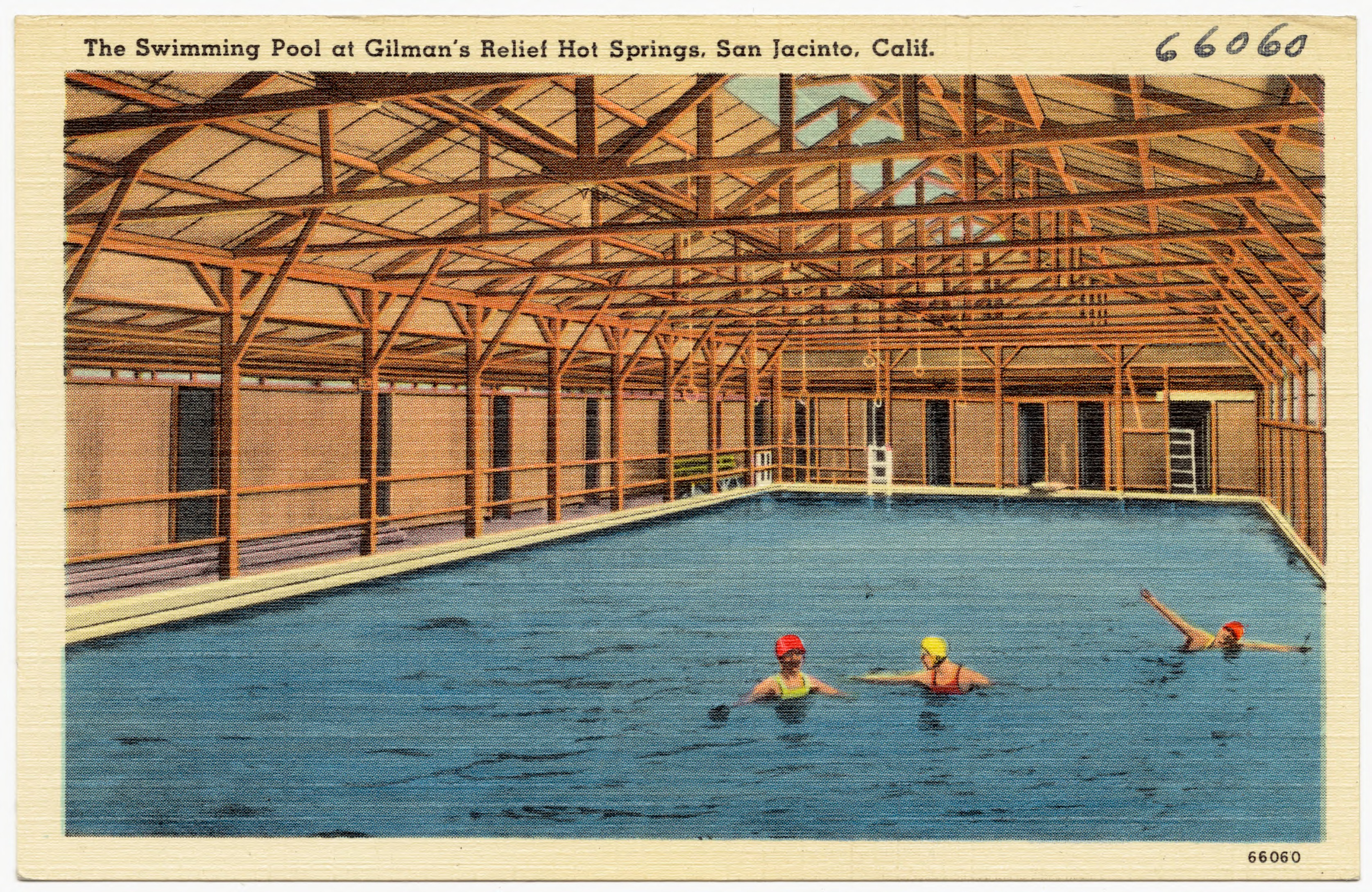
Swimming pool at Gilman's Relief Hot Springs

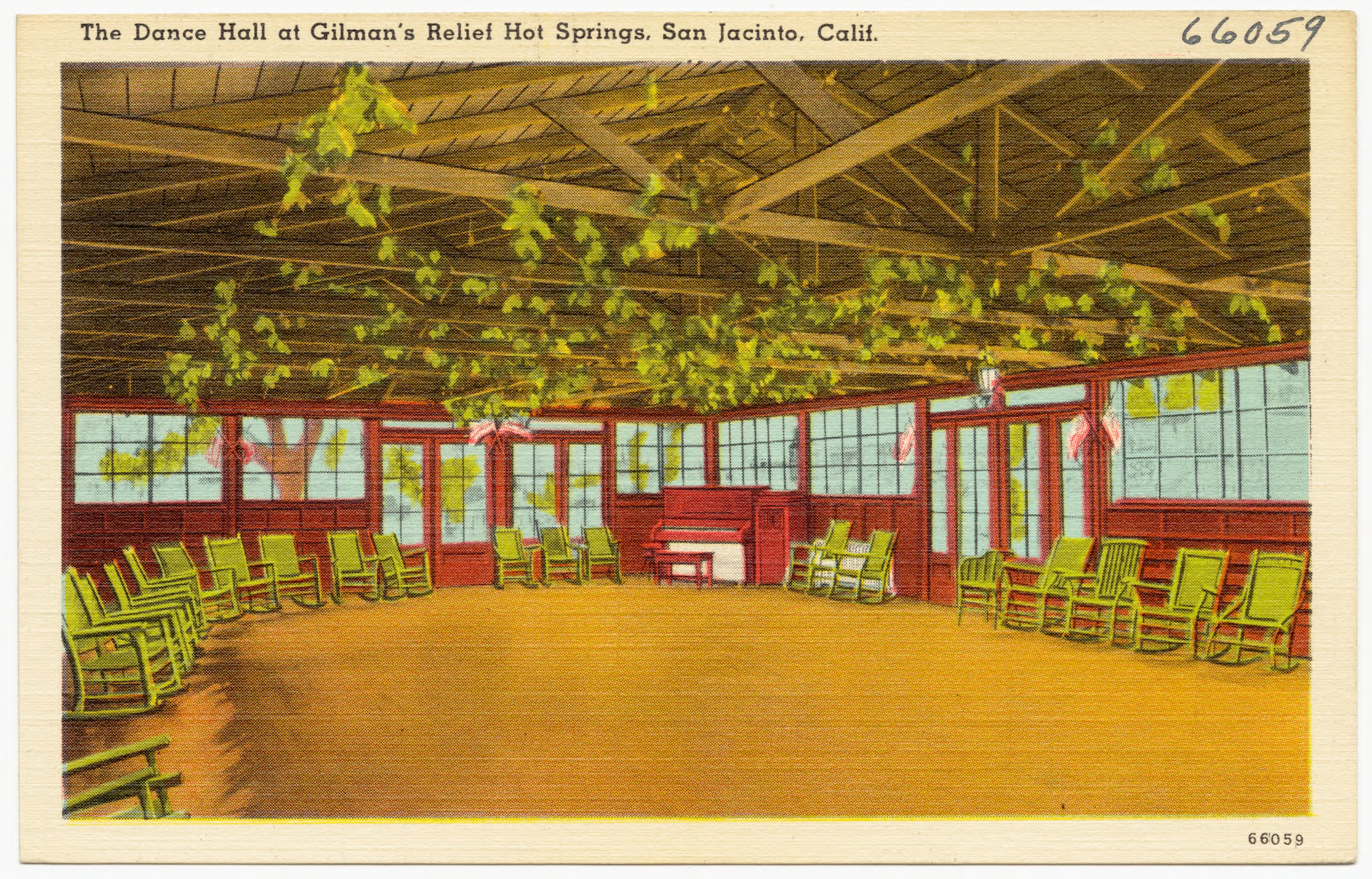
Dance hall at Gilman's Relief Hot Springs

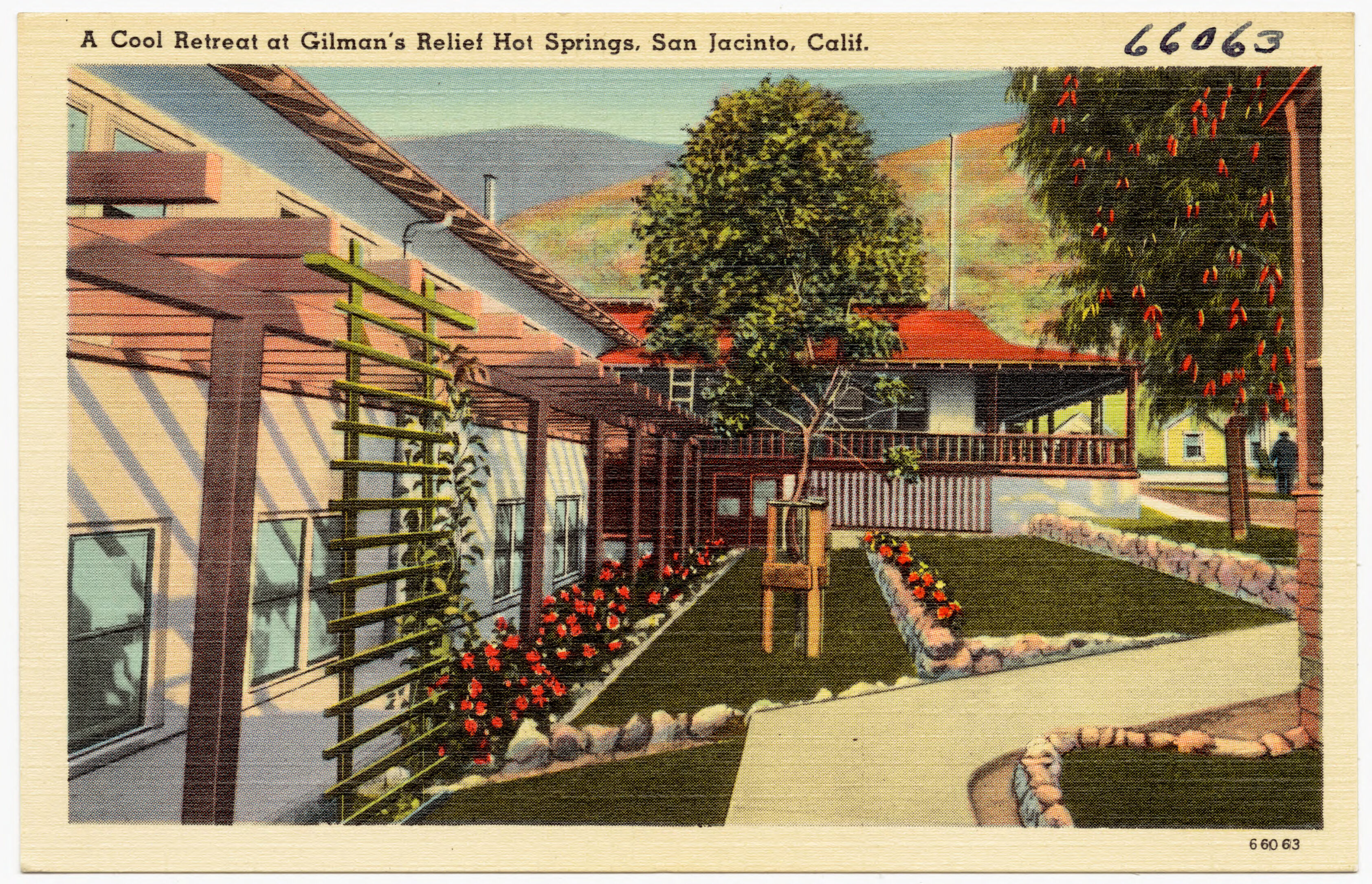
Walkways

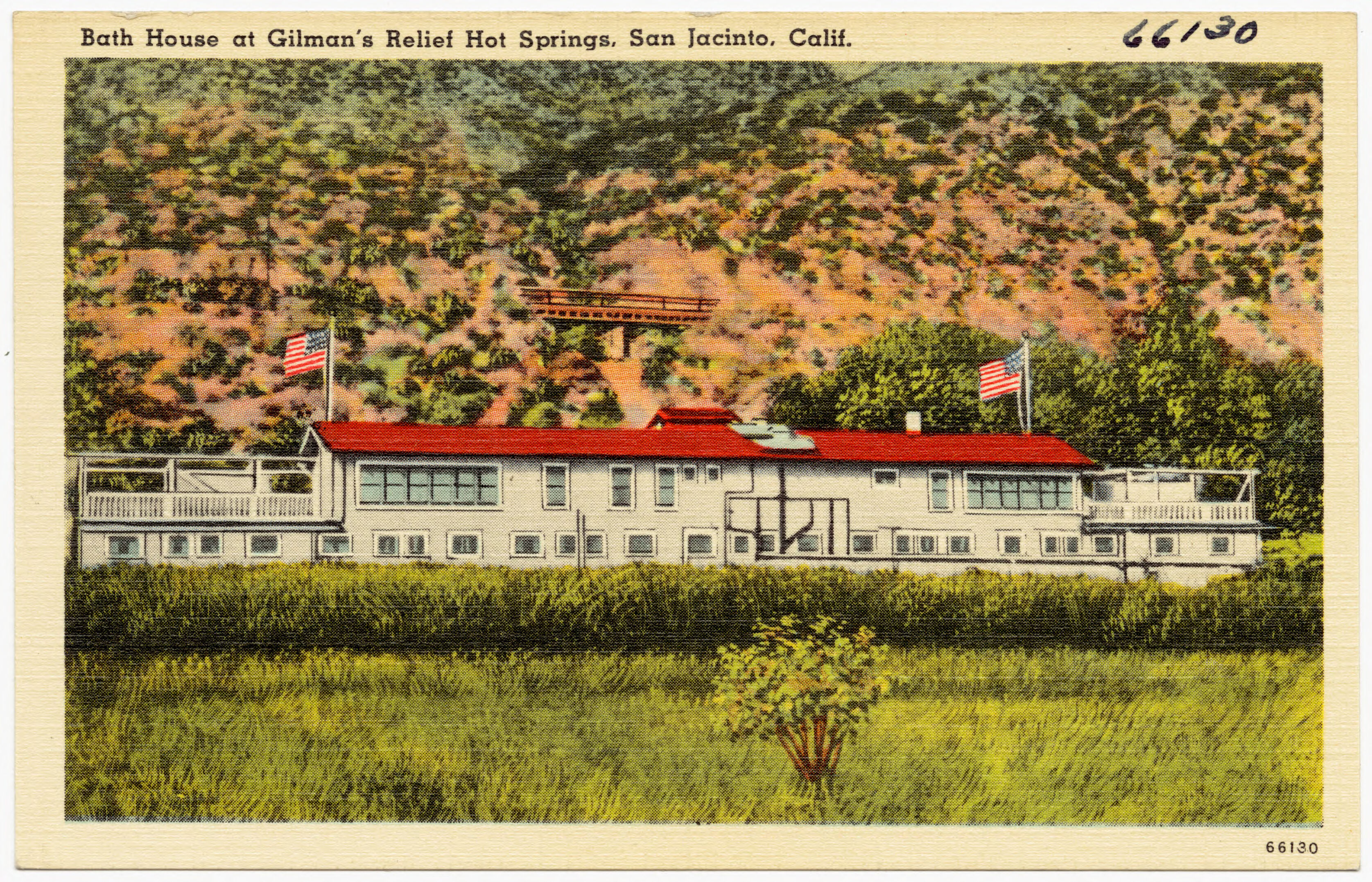
Bath house

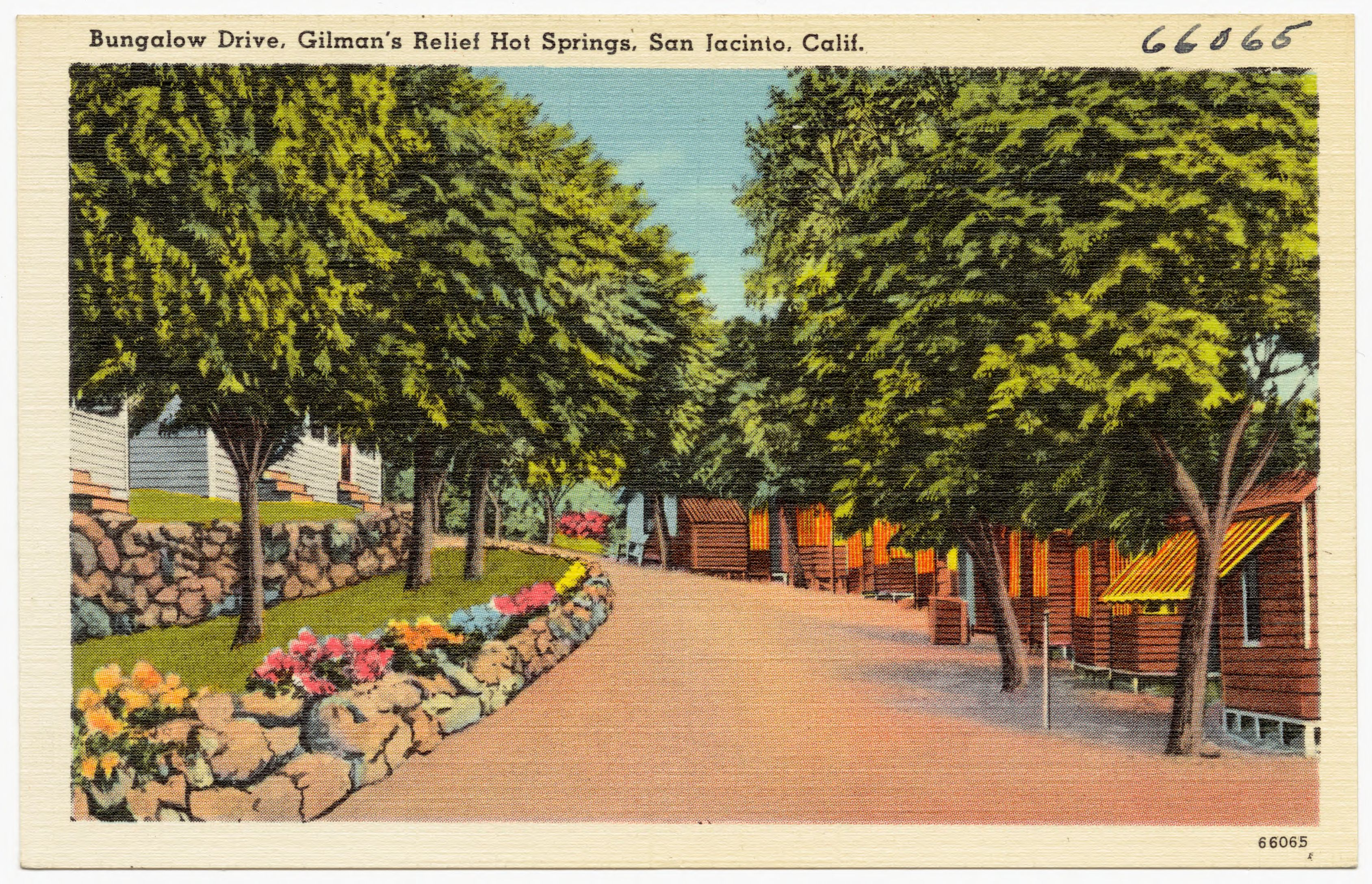
Bungalow drive

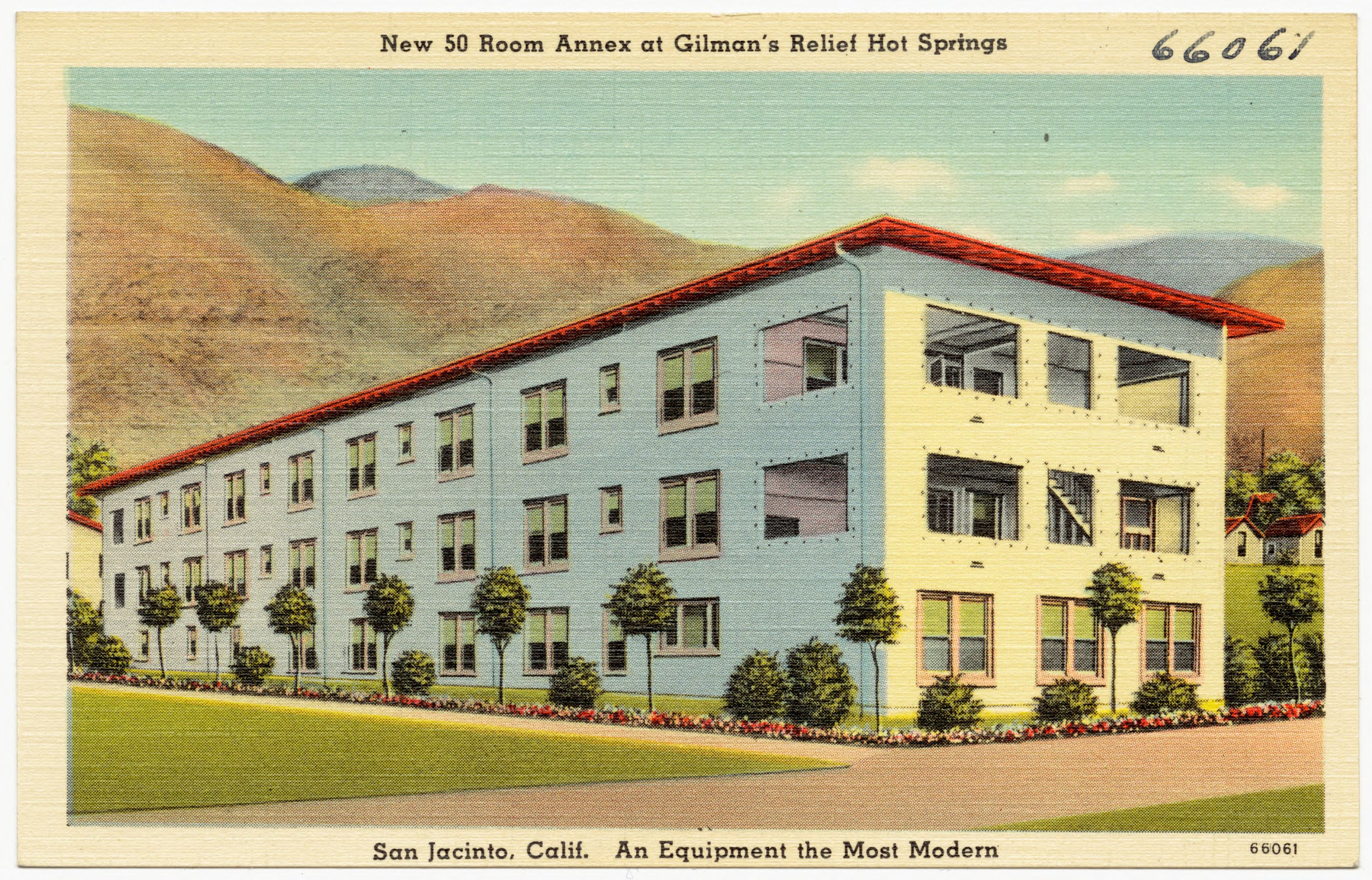
New 50-room annex

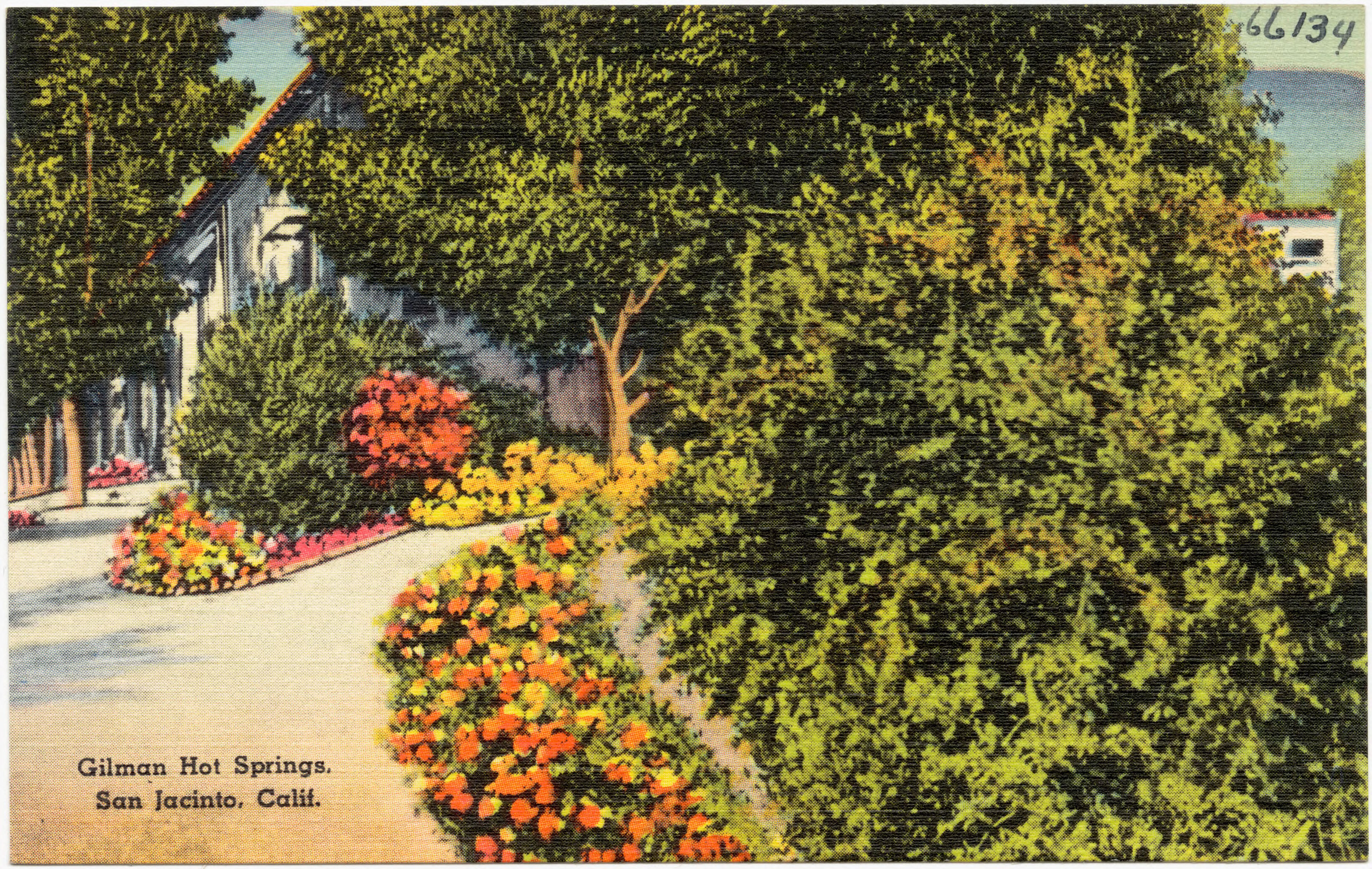
Gardens

== See also ==
- Ocean Park fire (1912)
- Ramona Bowl, Hemet
- Riverside–Rialto Line
- List of hot springs in the United States
