= Potrero Creek =

San Jacinto River tributary, California, U.S.

Coordinates: 33°50′01″N 117°00′09″W

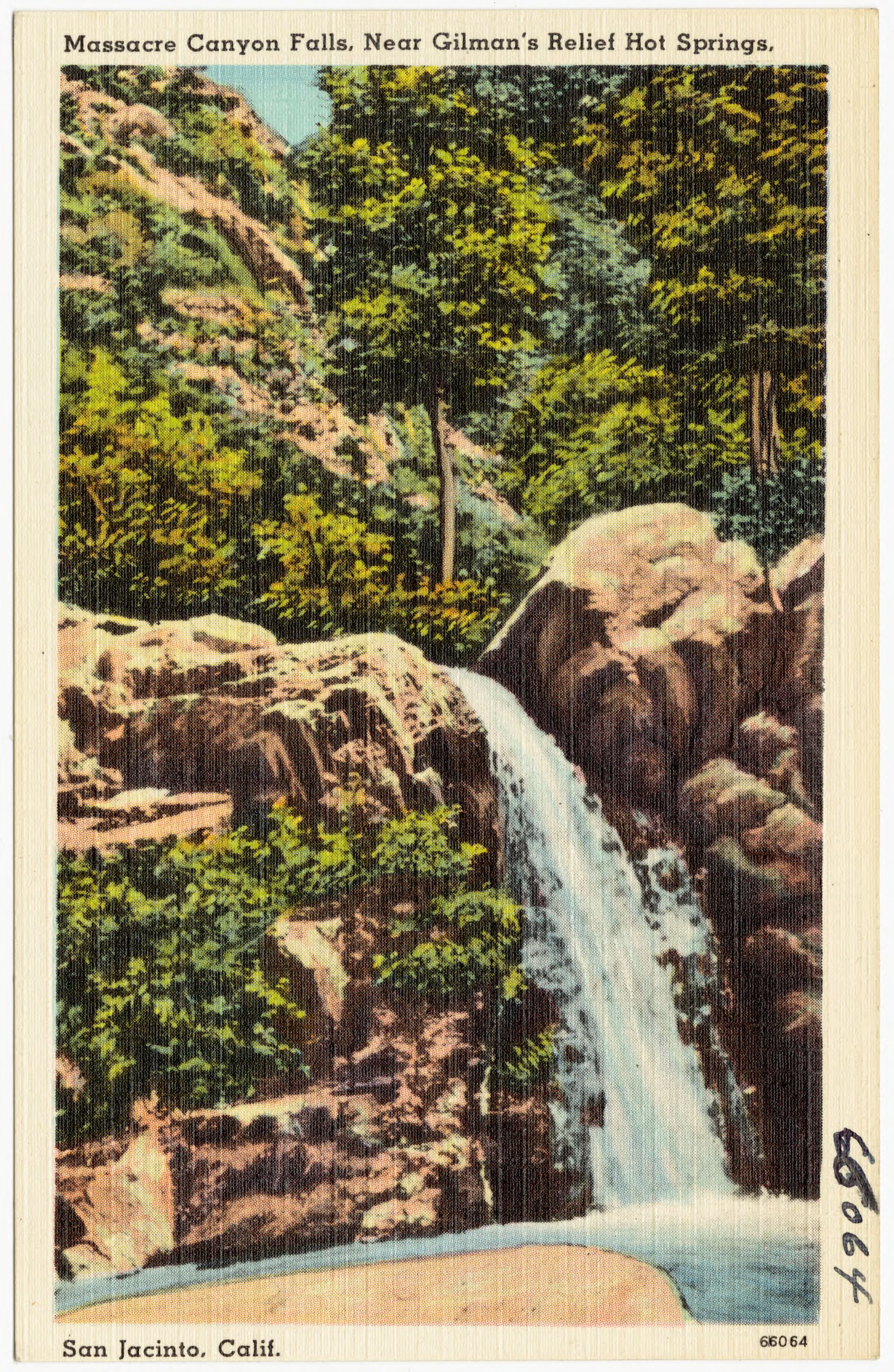
Potrero Creek waterfall in Massacre Canyon (Tichnor Bros. postcard c. 1930–1945)

Potrero Creek is a minor waterway of Riverside County, California in the United States. Potrero Creek has a 5-mile (8.0 km)-long course and flows south through the San Jacinto River basin. Potrero Creek drains about 35 square miles (91 km^{2}) of the San Jacinto Mountains. Potrero joins the San Jacinto River near California State Route 79, at Gilman Hot Springs, California. There are reportedly a small group of cave shelters along Potrero Creek in Massacre Canyon, south of Beaumont, on what was called the Stanton Ranch in 1962. Massacre Canyon supposedly gets its name from a battle that took place around 1540, when Temecula people massacred defenders of a village (with associated chia plantings) of the tribe now known as the Soboba Band of Luiseño Indians, which was called Ivah and was located at what is now Gilman Hot Springs, California.
