= Soboba Band of Luiseño Indians =

Native Luiseño Indians in Southern California

Coordinates: 33°46′39″N 116°52′52″W

Total population
- 1,200 enrolled tribal members, 522 on reservation

Regions with significant populations
- United States (California)

Languages
- Luiseño, English, and Spanish

Religion
- Traditional tribal religion, Christianity

Related ethnic groups
- other Luiseño tribes, Ajachmem (Juaneño), Cupeño, Cahuilla, Serrano, Gabrieliño-Tongva and Chemehuevi

The Soboba Band of Luiseño Indians is a federally recognized tribe of Luiseño people, headquartered in Riverside County, California. On June 18, 1883, the Soboba Reservation was established by the United States government in San Jacinto. There are five other federally recognized tribes of Luiseño people in southern California.

== History ==
=== Contact and change ===
The Luiseño Indians first encountered Europeans acting as missionaries, and the Luiseño allowed them to come through their community because they were literate. Writers passed through the San Jacinto valley where the Luiseño were settled and recorded much of their culture. Along with missionaries and soldiers were a part of the 1776 Juan Bautista de Anza expedition overland to and through Las Californias sponsored by the Spanish monarchy. took the Luiseño homeland and claimed it theirs for the San Antonio de Pala Asistencia cattle rancho. According to Father Jose Sanchez:

"Proceeding in the same direction, we stopped at Jaguara, so called by the natives, but by our people San Jacinto. This is the rancho for the cattle of Mission San Luis Rey de Francia, distant from Temecula about eleven or twelve leagues."

== Soboba reservation ==
The reservation was given back to the Luiseño after the United States Government took control of California. An Executive Order established the Soboba reservation June 18, 1883.

=== Community ===
The members of the Soboba Band of Luiseño Indians have built a self-sustaining community. Their work includes agriculture and entertainment. Because of the businesses that they created, the economy of Soboba is strong.

The tribe has built their own schools, including Noli Indian School, which serves grades one through twelve. They have also created non-profit organizations and a charity with the money they have made from all of their businesses.

== Accomplishments and economy ==
=== Agriculture ===
The Soboba began their economy with agriculture, starting with apricots. Over time, they developed the land surrounding the reservation. The members of the tribe worked their way outside of their own community and working in the citrus industry. This agricultural industry allowed them to build their economy and expand.

=== Soboba Casino ===
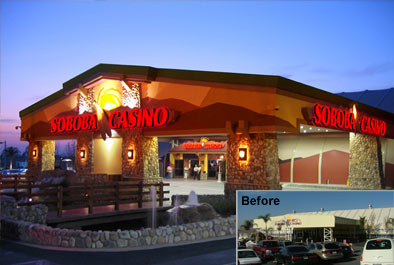
Soboba Casino, 2007, with earlier design inset.

In the late 20th century, the Soboba established a gaming casino to earn profits for economic development and for the support of their people. Under California and federal gambling laws, they could operate a gaming casino on their reservation, which is sovereign territory.

This casino is located about 100 miles (160 km) from Los Angeles. The casino is the biggest source of income for the tribe.

==== Entertainment attractions ====
Soboba has also developed a country club, which hosts golf tournaments and has a condominium resort. This resort opened May 2008. From 2009 to 2012, the resort held the Soboba Golf Classic.

== Tribal government ==
=== Enrollment ===
Membership of the tribe is determined by birth. Although a member is not required to live or be born on the reservation, each must be a documented descendant of another member. Being a member of the tribe entitles one to voting rights for the government of the tribe.

=== Offices ===
The government is administered by five tribal council members. The tribal chairman is the highest position of power and is elected by a popular vote of members of the tribe. The vice chairwoman, secretary, treasurer, and member at large are put into position by demand of the elected council.

The tribal government makes business decisions and laws for the Soboba reservation. Elections are held like general elections in the United States, and absentee ballots are available upon prior approval.

== See also ==
- Indigenous peoples of California
- California mission clash of cultures
- California Mission Indians
