= Doremus =

Doremus is a surname. Notable people with the surname include:

- Benoît Dorémus (born 1980), French singer-songwriter
- David Doremus (born 1957), American television actor
- Frank Ellsworth Doremus (1865–1947), politician
- Franklin Pierce Doremus (1852–1944), American vegetarianism activist
- Henry Meade Doremus, Mayor of Newark, New Jersey
- John Doremus (1931–1995), American radio personality
- Sarah Platt Doremus (1802–1877), New York City philanthropist
- Robert Ogden Doremus (1824–1906), United States chemist and physician, son of Sarah Platt Doremus
- Charles Avery Doremus (1851–1925), United States chemist, son of Robert Ogden Doremus
- Louis Doremus Huntoon (1869–1937), American mining engineer
- Drake Doremus (born 1983), American film director and screenwriter
- Estelle Skidmore Doremus (1830–1905), New York City philanthropist

== See also ==
- Doremus & Co., advertising agency
