= Underhill (surname) =

Underhill is a surname. Notable people with the surname include:

- Adelaide Underhill (1860–1936), American librarian
- Andrew Underhill (1749–1794), American silversmith
- Arthur Underhill (1850–1939), English barrister and scholar
- Barbara Underhill (born 1963), Canadian figure skater
- Beth Underhill (born 1962), Canadian equestrian
- Cave Underhill (1634 – c. 1710), English actor
- Charles Edward Underhill (1845–1908) British surgeon
- David Harris Underhill (1850–1936), American librarian and author
- Edward Bean Underhill (1813–1901), English Baptist historian and biographer
- Evelyn Underhill (1875–1941), British writer
- Felicity Underhill, New Zealand energy specialist
- Francis Underhill (1878–1943), English bishop, and cousin of Evelyn Underhill
- Frank Underhill (1889–1971), Canadian historian and social activist
- Fulke Underhill (1578–1599), the son of William Underhill II of Warwickshire, owner of New Place
- George Lees Underhill (1813–1881), iron merchant who became thirteenth Mayor of Wolverhampton, 1861/62
- Henry Underhill, (1855–1920), Oxford-based amateur scientist and photographer
- Sir Hercules Underhill (1581–1658), who confirmed the sale of New Place to William Shakespeare
- Hugh Underhill (1518–1593), English keeper of the wardrobe under Queen Elizabeth I
- John Underhill (1545–1592), Bishop of Oxford, 1589–1592
- Captain John Underhill (1597–1672), English colonist and soldier in the Massachusetts Bay Colony
- John Edward Underhill (1574–1608), English diplomat and exile
- Irving Underhill (1872–1960), American commercial photographer
- John Q. Underhill (1848–1907), American politician
- John R. Underhill (born 1961), British geologist and football referee
- Martyn Underhill (born 1958), Detective and Police and Crime Commissioner Dorset
- Sir Nicholas Underhill (born 1952), British lawyer and judge
- Paco Underhill, American environmental psychologist
- Reg Underhill (1914–1993), British Labour Party politician
- Robert L. M. Underhill (1889–1983), American mountaineer
- Roy Underhill (born 1950), American woodwright and host of the television series "The Woodwright's Shop"
- Sam Underhill (born 1996), England Rugby player
- Steven Underhill (born 1962), American photographer
- Thomas Edgar Underhill (1854–1917) British physician
- Wilbur Underhill, Jr. (1901–1934), American criminal, burglar, bank robber and Depression-era outlaw
- William Wilson Underhill (1839–1935), American businessman, President of the United States Fire Insurance Company of New York
- William Underhill (1933–2022), American sculptor

Fictional characters:

- Sophia Underhill (aka Kate Kingsley), romantic interest of Giordano Bruno in Heresy and Sacrilege by S. J. Parris (Stephanie Merritt)
- Susan Underhill (aka Betty Jo Bialosky), character from The Further Adventures of Nick Danger by Firesign Theater
- Ted Underhill, character in the films Fletch (film) and Fletch Lives
- Underhill (first name not mentioned), an FBI interrogator in John Grisham's novel The Partner
- Frodo Baggins (aka Mr. Underhill), character from J. R. R. Tolkien's novel The Lord of the Rings
