= John Underhill =

John Underhill may refer to:

- Sir John Underhill (died 1679), courtier to Elizabeth I of England
- John Underhill (bishop) (1545–1592), English academic and bishop of Oxford
- John Edward Underhill (1574–1608)
- John Underhill (captain) (1597–1672), English colonist and soldier
- John Q. Underhill (1848–1907), U.S. Representative from New York
- John R. Underhill (born 1961), British professor of stratigraphy and former Scottish Premier League football referee
- John Garrett Underhill (1876–1946), author and stage producer
- John Garrett Underhill Jr. (1915–1964), U.S. Army officer
