= Irving Underhill =

American commercial photographer

- Born: November 11, 1872; Jersey City, New Jersey, U.S.
- Died: 1960 (aged 87–88)
- Occupation: Commercial photographer
- Known for: Photography and postcards of iconic New York City scenes
- Board member of: Underhill Society of America
- Parent(s): William James Underhill (1836-1895) and Louise Prince

Irving Underhill (1872–1960) was one of the most notable commercial photographers in New York City during the first half of the 20th century. He produced work that was featured in postcards and numerous publications while he was still alive, and that continues to be exhibited and receive recognition long after his death. Beyond work, Underhill was a long-time member of the Rotary Club of New York, and President of the Underhill Society of America.

== Biography ==
Irving Underhill was born in Jersey City, New Jersey, on November 11, 1872. He was the son of William James Underhill (1836–1895), a produce commission merchant, who married Louise Prince of Flushing, New York. They had several children, of which Irving Underhill was the youngest.

Irving Underhill opened his photography business in 1896, and provided artistic portraits, city views and panoramas, group photographs, marine, legal, and machinery photography. He married Laura Davison on February 16, 1898. Irving was a photographer in New York City and served in the New Jersey Army National Guard. By 1922 his studio was in an impressive building on the corner of Broadway and Park Place. Incidentally, this building has since been lost and replaced by a skyscraper. In 1928 his residence was 277 Harrison Ave., Jersey City, New Jersey.

Underhill was a member of the Rotary Club of New York among several other organizations. He received special recognition for his 25 years as a Rotary Club member in 1938. Underhill was present at the funeral of Pirie MacDonald, another professional photographer and Rotarian in 1942.

== Highlights of artistic output and recognition ==
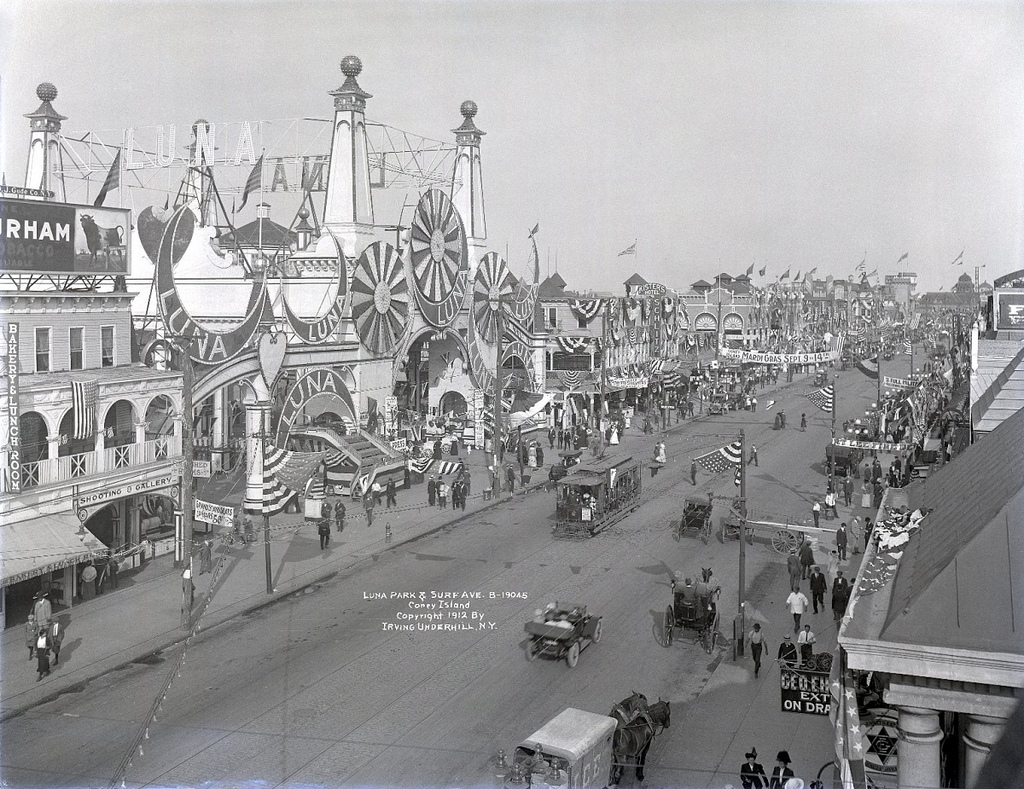
Irving Underhill, Luna Park and Surf Avenue, Coney Island, 1912. Gelatin dry glass plate negative. Brooklyn Museum

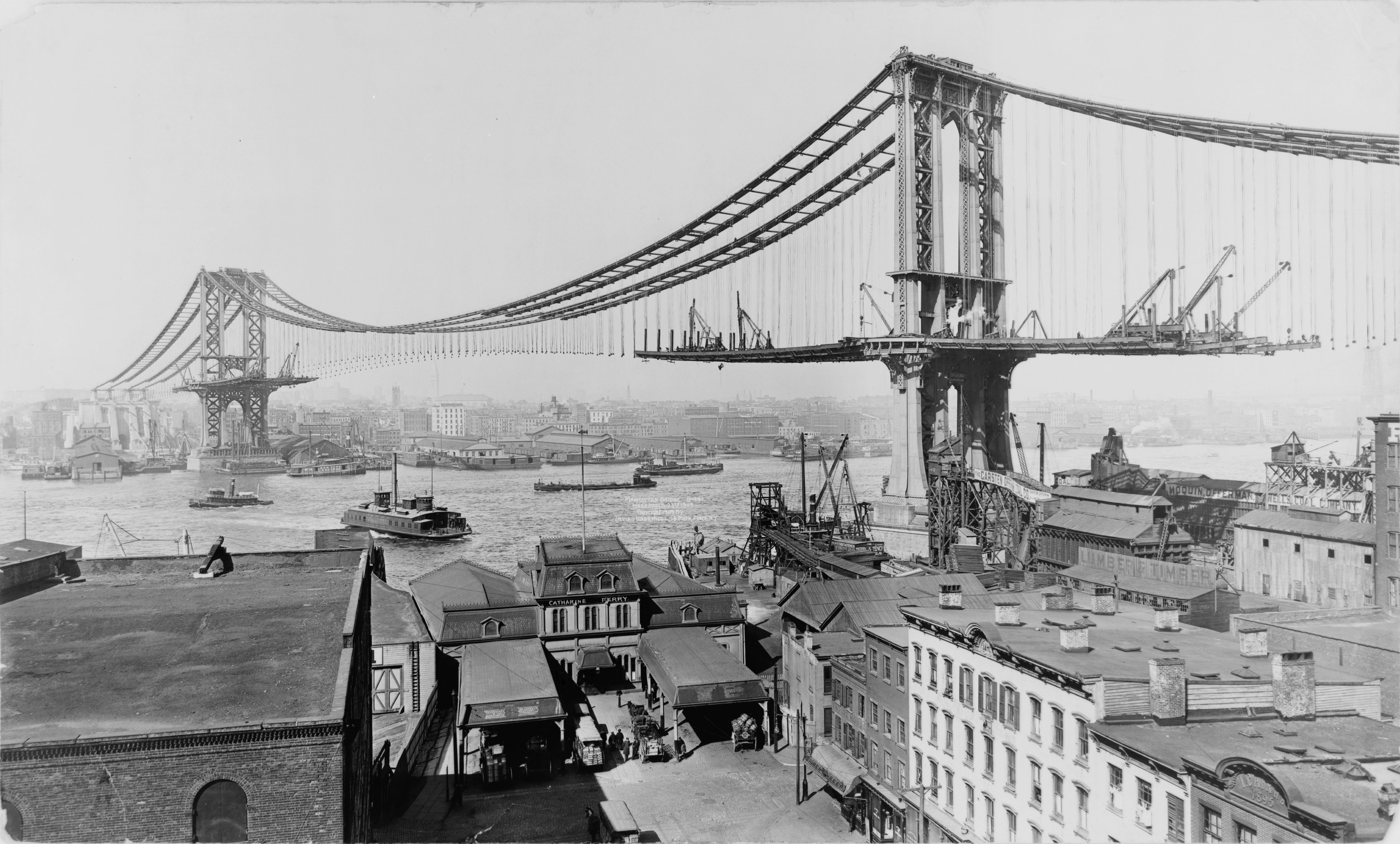
Irving Underhill, Manhattan Bridge Construction 1909

Underhill took a particular interest in capturing the cityscape, landmarks, tall buildings, and nautical scenes. In 1911 Woolworth hired Underhill - whose studio directly fronted the building site - to document the construction of the Woolworth Building at regularly timed intervals. The photographs were then mailed to store managers throughout the country and abroad, with the recommendation that they be distributed and published as "widely as possible." Another self-published work that was a promotional piece in collaboration with the Hudson River Day Line was entitled The Hudson River: photo-gravures.

He was enlisted in the Prohibition with photographs from a Federal Prohibition Laboratory that accompanied a 1926 New York Times article, showing shelves and shelves of liquor.

Irving Underhill was particularly adept at showing the juxtaposition of old pedestrian-scaled buildings and newer skyscrapers that seemed to dominate the older city. Such was the case with one photo of the Trinity Church Spire, shown against the new fifty-story 1 Wall Street at Broadway and Wall, which in 1931 was said to be the most costly plot of real estate in the entire world. Underhill also photographed the rise of the Empire State Building.

In an article celebrating the 50th anniversary of the Architectural League of New York, in 1931, an article in The New York Times entitled "From Roofs to Towers and Slats", prominently featured a photograph Irving Underhill. This photograph showed the skyline below City Hall Park at the beginning of the century, to symbolize the passing of an era before tall buildings began to dominate the cityscape.

In 1982, a book entitled New York, photographs, 1850-1950 featured some of Underhill's work, particular his photo of Columbus Circle between 58th and 60th Streets.

A photo of the Woolworth Building in 1913 made shortly after construction was completed was highlighted in a 1993 New York Times article. Charles Hagen compared this photo with an etching from John Marin about the same time, and wrote "Irving Underhill's photo, made the same year, offers a more sober depiction of the building's Gothic forms than Marin's giddy impression, but records it with a mixture of down-to-earth factuality and pride."

Irving Underhill's work was displayed along with Berenice Abbott's in 1993 exhibition by the Museum of the City of New York entitled "New York Saved: 30 Years of Landmarks Preservation." The exhibition displayed Underhill's photo of the exterior of Grand Central Terminal in 1919. Still later, a photograph showing the West Street Building and the Singer Tower from the Hudson River, taken by Underhill ca. 1908, was included in a book on Cass Gilbert.

The work of Irving Underhill continues to resonate today. A colored postcard of Columbus Circle from 1925, was used in a 2005 New York Times article. His picture of the Manhattan Bridge from a New York Times article in 1909, was highlighted in a 2009 article talking about the same bridge and how it has struggled to earn recognition and respect. Underhill's photo shows the beginning of decking being hung tenuously from the thick and heavy cables overhead.

Digitization efforts have brought Underhill's work into the public spotlight once again. The New York Public Library Digital Gallery, includes 249 Items under the name "Underhill, Irving" in their digital collection available via their website. Likewise, the Museum of the City of New York has 142 results of digitized images available to view in their online collection. The Brooklyn Museum now has 119 Underhill images in their online digital collection.

== Participation in Underhill Society and other family organizations ==
Irving Underhill's participation in the Underhill Society of America began innocuously enough, serving as a "family photographer". Over time he became Treasurer between 1906 and 1932 and later President of the Society between 1946 and 1950.

When Society President Francis Jay Underhill was travelling through Europe in 1928, Irving Underhill was the recipient of numerous postcards. Irving Underhill applied his photographic talents to Underhill subjects as well, such as in 1931 when he took a photograph of the Myron Charles Taylor residence in Locust Valley.

Following the death of Willard Underhill Taylor, his brother Myron Charles Taylor was proposed as a Director for the Underhill Society. Despite actively being involved in affairs of the Underhill Society, Taylor declined. Following the death of John Garrett Underhill, Sr., who served as President of the Underhill Society, Myron Charles Taylor speculated about the possibility of placing the Underhill Society and Underhill Burying Ground under the control of the Nassau County Historical Society. This proposal never transpired. Once again, Irving Underhill reached out to Myron Charles Taylor to become an officer of the Underhill Society, and speculating about the need for protection of the Underhill Westchester Burying Ground. Irving Underhill also served as Treasurer and President of the Westchester Burying Ground. Taylor declined an Officer position again though gave some input on the future of the Society in a letter dated March 23, 1948.
