= Underhill =

Underhill may refer to:

== Places ==
- Underhill, a community within the rural community of Miramichi River Valley, Canada
- Underhill (ward), Barnet, London
- Underhill, Dorset, England
- Underhill Stadium, Barnet, England, the former home ground of Barnet F.C.
- Underhill, Vermont, United States
- Underhill, Wisconsin, United States
- Underhill (community), Wisconsin. an unincorporated community, United States
- Underhill, Gateshead, Tyne and Wear, first house in the world to be lit by Electric light
- Underhill, Wolverhampton, a housing estate in North-east Wolverhampton also known as the Scotlands Estate.

== Fiction ==
- Underhill, the name of the first settlement on Mars in the novel Red Mars by Kim Stanley Robinson
- Underhill, fictional character in the short story The Rule of Names by Ursula K. Le Guin
- Underhill, an alternate reality inhabited by any multitude of fantasy creatures in Mercedes Lackey's urban fantasy novels
- Sherkaner Underhill, fictional non-human character in the novel A Deepness in the Sky by Vernor Vinge
- Underhill, Ted, fictional character in the movie Fletch
- Underhill, Mr., the name Gandalf gave Frodo Baggins to travel under when he left Hobbiton in The Fellowship of the Ring by J.R.R. Tolkien

== Other ==
- Underhill (surname), notable people named Underhill
- USS Underhill (DE-682), a ship of the U.S. Navy
