= Silas Albertson Underhill =

- Born: 1838
- Died: 24 December 1906 (aged 67–68); Brooklyn Union Gas Company, Brooklyn, New York
- Occupation: Assistant Clerk
- Employer: New York State Supreme Court
- Height: 6 ft 4 in (193 cm)

Silas Albertson Underhill was an orthodox Quaker, an attorney, and later an assistant clerk in the New York Supreme Court, Brooklyn. He also served in the Civil War, and later was a member of the Grant Post of the Grand Army of the Republic. As Secretary of the Underhill Society of America, he played an important role in the erection of a monument to honor his ancestor Captain John Underhill at the Underhill Burying Ground.

== Biography ==
Silas Albertson Underhill (1840-1906) was born the son of Alexander Underhill (1810–1891) and Phebe W. Albertson (1818–1847) in a frame house on the north-east corner of Park and Bedford Avenues in Brooklyn, New York, that is no longer extant. His father Alexander Underhill was born in house Major John Andre was captured on the highway from Peekskill to Somerstown. When Alexander was a young man he came to Brooklyn and engage in the mil business with Delmonico Farm—the largest dairy in and around Brooklyn.

He was one of twelve students to receive the degree of Bachelor of Arts from Haverford College during commencement exercises in 1860. Following that study, he went on to Harvard University where he studied law and graduated in 1862 with the degree of Bachelor of Laws.

As a member of the Society of Friends the Society was opposed to war, though Underhill himself believed in defensive war. Ultimately he decided to give his services and was enlisted in the Regiment of Colonel Stewart L. Woodford. The Regiment was stationed on Staten Island. Soon he was sent to the front in Virginia. Engaged as a private soldier, he never participated in a battle, though was part in three or four skirmishes. He was certain of the fact that he never killed a man because he could not shoot straight enough. By virtue of joining the war he resigned from the Society of Friends of which he was a member.

General Steward L. Woodford recognized he was a college man and selected him as one of his secretaries to write in his headquarters. Underhill maintained this position until the end of the war. He remained with General Woodford including when he became the Military Governor of Charleston, South Carolina.

The fact that Underhill survived the war is no small feat. One account of Underhill follows:

No less conspicuous was Silas A. Underhill... I mostly see him towering above all others in the fray of the shinny ground, or resting watchfully on his long shinny, awaiting the ball which was sure to go home with his well-directed blow. Enlisting as a private soldier, and continuing such from principle throughout the entire Rebellion, he survived its vicissitudes and dangers.

After the war Underhill returned to New York and found employment in a law office. Following the war he applied and was reinstated into the Society of Friends in May 1868. He also became a member of the Ulysses S. Grant Post #327 of the Grand Army of the Republic.

Underhill took an active interest in the Friends'; First Day School in 1866. He remained Superintendent for nearly twenty years. He also served as Clerk of Friends' Monthly Meeting.

Late in life Silas A. Underhill married Frances Gertrude Lowerre, the daughter of Benjamin and Anna Lowerre, who already had a son and daughter. She had three children by way of her first husband Samuel Willis Rushmore.

He lived at 119 Montague Street in Brooklyn, New York. Underhill studied law and practiced for several years before he became attached to the Supreme Court. Following the death of Silas Underhill, his wife Frances Gertrude Underhill appears to have moved to 335 Clinton Avenue in Brooklyn.

Underhill was actively involved in efforts to erect a memorial for his Colonial era ancestor Captain John Underhill at the Underhill Burying Ground in Lattingtown, New York, and is named on the dedicatory plaque on the monument. He also served as Recording Secretary of the Underhill Society of America between 1892 and 1896.

Silas Albertson Underhill died December 24, 1906, in the office of the Brooklyn Union Gas Company. His death was recounted as follows in one source: "Went into an office to pay a gas bill. Sat on a settee. His head partly fell. Asked if he was sick. Breathing heavy. In ten minutes he was dead."

A Memorial Address on Silas Albertson Underhill was made at a meeting of the Underhill Society of America on February 16, 1907.

The role of Silas Underhill in the dedication ceremony for the Captain John Underhill monument at the Underhill Burying Ground was recognized in a re-enactment that took place in 2008.
