= Elizabeth Johnson Ward Doremus =

American dramatist (1853–1934)

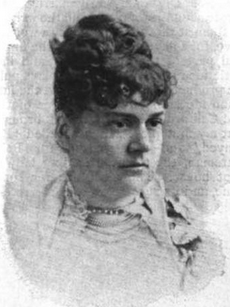
- Elizabeth Johnson Ward Doremus, from an 1895 publication.
- Born: Elizabeth Johnson Ward; May 24, 1853; Newport, Kentucky
- Died: April 15, 1934 (aged 80); New York City
- Other name: Mrs. C. A. Doremus
- Occupation: Playwright
- Spouse: Charles Avery Doremus
- Relatives: Robert Ogden Doremus (father-in-law); James Taylor V (great-grandfather)

Elizabeth Johnson Ward Doremus (May 22, 1853 – April 15, 1934), known professionally as Mrs. C. A. Doremus, was an American playwright.

== Early life ==
Elizabeth Johnson Ward was born in Newport, Kentucky, the daughter of George Washington Ward and Josephine Beauharnais Harris Ward. Her father and his brother owned plantations in Mississippi before the American Civil War. Her great-grandfather was James Taylor V (1769–1848), banker and founder of Newport, a cousin of President James Madison.

== Career ==
Doremus wrote plays, including Larks (1886), A Boy Hero (1887), The Charbonniere, A Chinese Puzzle, Compressed Gunpowder, Dorothy, Fernande, Fleurette, Pranks, Real Life or Andy, A Fair Bohemian (1888), The Circus Rider (1888, starring Rosina Vokes), Mrs. Pendleton's Four-in-Hand (1893, based on a story by Gertrude Atherton), The Fortunes of the King (1904), By Right of the Sword (1905), and The Duchess of Devonshire (1906, written for Canadian actress Roselle Knott).

She also co-wrote The Sleeping Beauty (1878) with Mrs. Burton Harrison, A Wild Idea (1888) with Elisabeth Marbury, A Full Hand (1894) with M. F. Stone, The Wheel of Time with T. R. Edwards, The Day Dream with E. R. Steiner, Mock Trial for Breach of Promise, with H. E. Manchester, Miss Devil-May-Care (1916), One of the Boys (1920) and A Castle in Spain (1935) with Leonidas Westervelt, and The Chain (1920) with Julia S. Trask.

Doremus managed society amateur theatrical performances in Elberon, New Jersey. She was a charter member of the Daughters of the American Revolution, and served on the executive committee of the Professional Women's League of New York.

== Personal life ==
Elizabeth Johnson Ward married chemist Charles Avery Doremus in 1880, in Washington, D.C. They had a daughter, Katherine (1889–1956), and two sons who died in infancy. Charles died in 1925; Elizabeth Doremus died after a stroke in 1934, aged 80 years, in New York City.
