= David Underhill =

David Underhill may refer to:

- David Harris Underhill, American librarian and author
- David Underhill, character in The Big Bang Theory (TV series)
