= Daniel Oscar Underhill =

- Born: c. 1845
- Died: December 29, 1929 (aged 83 or 84); South Orange, New Jersey, U.S.
- Occupation: Banker
- Employer: Brooklyn Bank

Daniel Oscar Underhill (c. 1845 – December 29, 1929) was an American banker who served as the President of the Brooklyn Bank. Prior to assuming that role for twelve years he was an assistant cashier of the Chase National Bank, and for thirty-nine years worked for the old Fourth National Bank. Among his other roles and titles including serving as a vice president of the Underhill Society of America.

== Biography ==
Underhill was Chief Clerk and later became the Assistant Cashier at the Fourth National Bank on February 19, 1895. As Assistant Cashier he was quoted on the practice of a stamp tax for a stamp to be affixed on checks for deposit. where he worked for thirty-nine years. Later he served as the Assistant Cashier of the Chase National Bank.

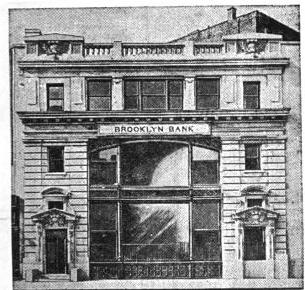
Brooklyn Bank at 585-587 Fulton St in Brooklyn around 1909. Building has been substantially altered though is still extant.

Daniel O. Underhill became President of the Brooklyn Bank and was onhand when it reopened on June 23, 1908. The bank was the oldest and one of the soundest and most conservative of the banking institutions in the borough. Nonetheless, it closed October 21, 1907. Very few of the former depositors closed their accounts and withdrew their funds. Several new deposits of considerable size were made giving the bank about $1,800,000 in cash available. Underhill continued to serve as President between 1908 and around 1911.

Underhill was present at dinner at the Union League Club to honor James Graham Cannon by financiers he helped to train.

Underhill was actively involved in efforts to erect a memorial for his Colonial era ancestor Captain John Underhill at the Underhill Burying Ground in Lattingtown, New York, and is named on the dedicatory plaque on the monument. He also served as Vice President of the Underhill Society of America.

The role of Daniel Oscar Underhill in the dedication ceremony for the Captain John Underhill monument at the Underhill Burying Ground was recognized in a re-enactment that took place in 2008.
