= List of Lope de Vega's plays in English translation =

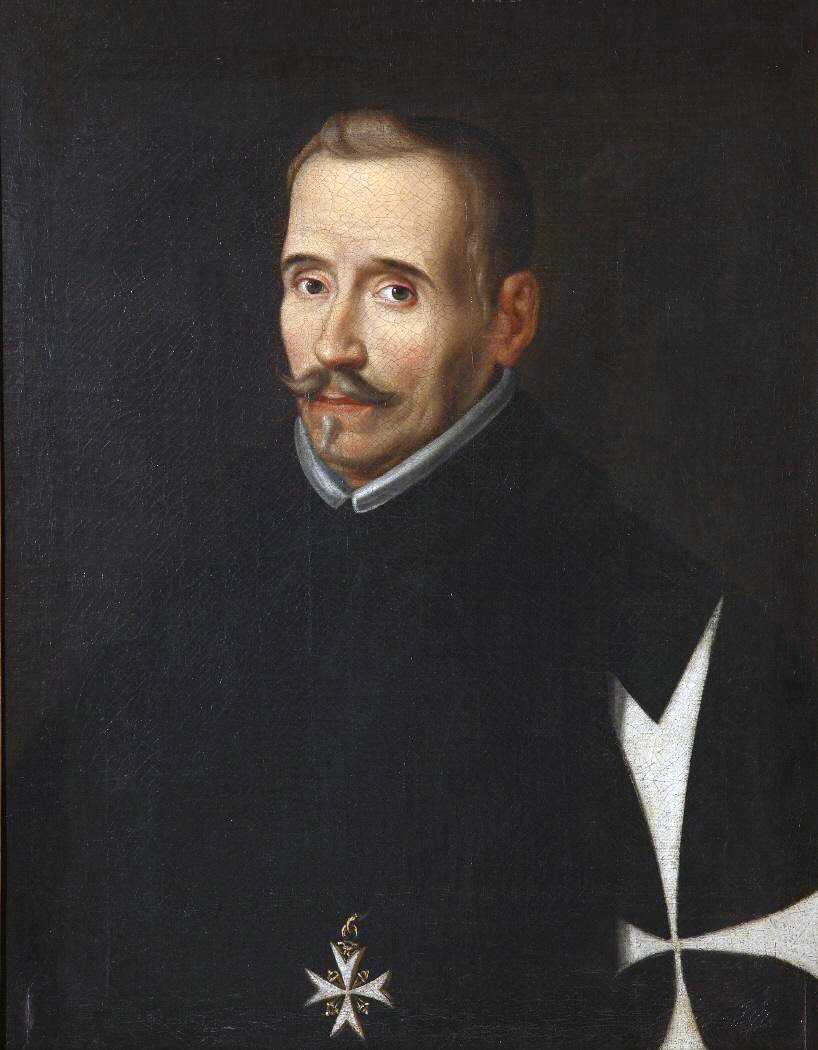
Lope de Vega

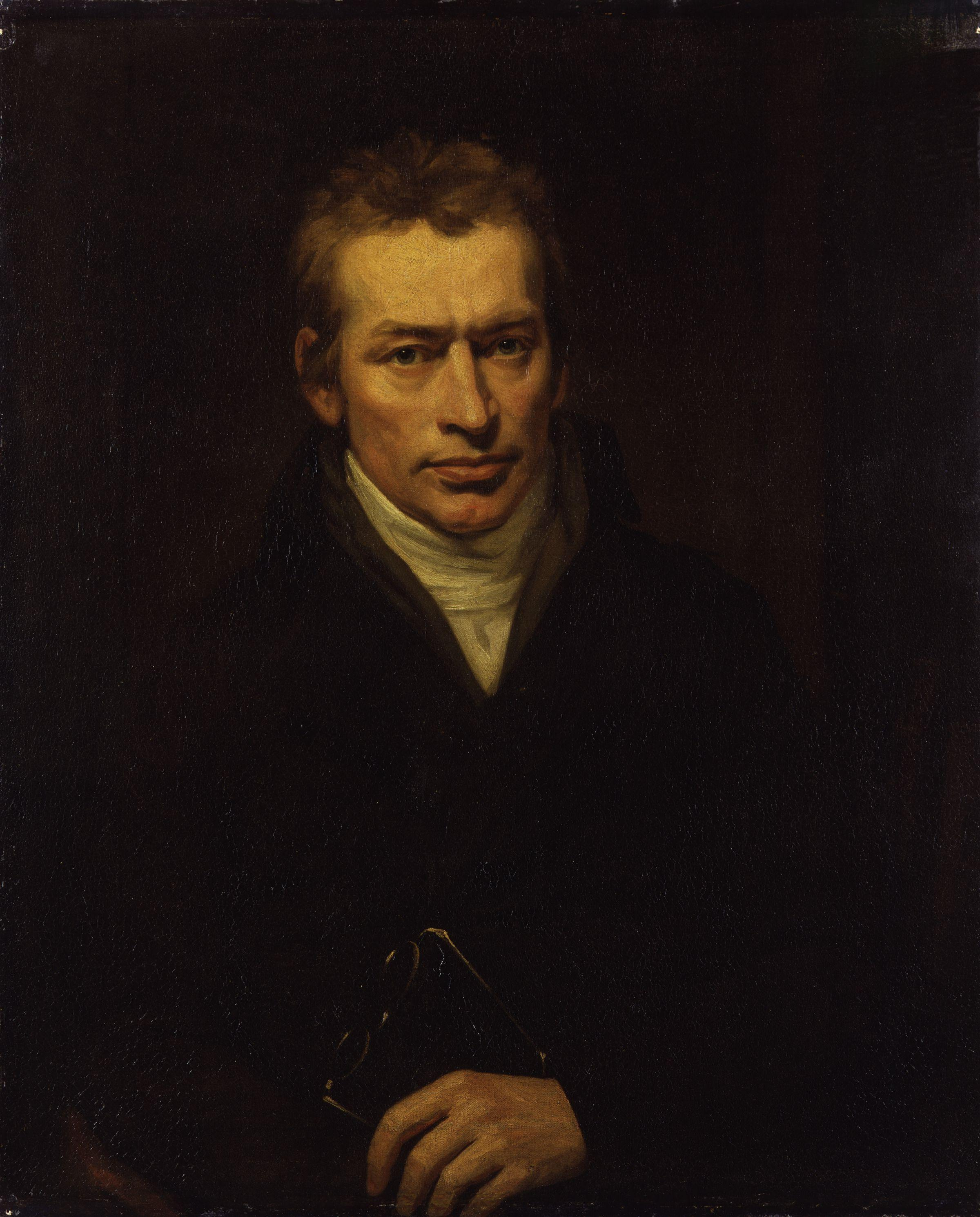
Thomas Holcroft

Lope, Spanish Golden Age playwright and "Monster of Nature"; and Holcroft, his earliest English translator.

Lope de Vega was a Spanish Golden Age poet and playwright. One of the most prolific writers in history, he was said to have written 2,200 plays (an average of nearly one per week for his entire adult life), though fewer than 400 survive today. In addition, he produced volumes of short and epic poems as well as prose works. For this fecundity, Cervantes nicknamed him the "Monster of Nature". His example crystallized the style of Spanish comedias for generations.

Over 50 English translations of Lope's plays have been published, all but three of them after 1900. As multiple translations of several plays have been made, this covers only about two dozen of Lope's Spanish originals. By far the most frequently translated play is Fuente Ovejuna (The Sheep Well), followed by The Dog in the Manger, The Knight of Olmedo, The Silly Lady, Peribáñez and the Comendador of Ocaña, and Capulets and Montagues.

== Translations ==
=== Key ===
- Spanish Title — The original comedia or auto that serves as the basis of the English text.
- English Title — The title of the English text, as it appears in the particular translation. Because one Spanish title may suggest alternate English titles (e.g. Fuente Ovejuna, The Sheep Well, All Citizens are Soldiers), sorting by this column is not a reliable way to group all translations of a particular original together; to do so, sort on Spanish Title.
- Year — The year of the translation's first publication. Some translations may have been written or produced earlier than this date, and some were republished subsequently, but this is not noted here.
- Publication — The publication in which the translation first appeared. When the publication consisted only of the single named play this information is not repeated, except in cases where the publication title is used as an external link to the work, or when it is matched with an ISBN.
- Notes — May indicate the style of translation or significant republications; all works are 3-act comedias unless noted.

=== Table ===
Spanish Title	English Title	Year	Translator	Publication	Notes
Castalvines y Monteses	Romeo and Juliet. A Comedy	1770	Anonymous	OCLC 836729121	"A perversion of Lope's play"
El padre engañado	The Father Outwitted	1805	Holcroft, Thomas?	The Theatrical Recorder, Vol. II, No. 7.	prose; 1-act interlude; reprinted in 1811 as The Father Outwitted at Google Books
Castalvines y Monteses	Castalvines y Monteses	1869	Cosens, F. W.	Castalvines y Monteses at the Internet Archive	blank verse
	The Punishment of the Flirtatious Wife	19??	Chambers, Jane	OCLC 20927441	prose
El Perro del hortelano	The Dog in the Manger	1903	Chambers, W. H. H.	In Alfred Bates: The Drama Volume VI: Spanish and Portuguese Drama at Google Books	prose
El mayor Alcalde el Rey	The King the Greatest Alcalde	1918	Underhill, John Garrett	Poet Lore (1918)	prose & verse; reprinted in World Drama, ed. Barrett H. Clark (1933) at the Internet Archive and Four Plays by Lope de Vega at the Internet Archive
Lo Cierto por lo dudoso	A Certainty for a Doubt	1936	Underhill, John Garrett	Four Plays by Lope de Vega at the Internet Archive	prose & verse
El Perro del hortelano	The Gardener's Dog	1936	Underhill, John Garrett	Four Plays by Lope de Vega at the Internet Archive	prose & verse
Fuente Ovejuna	Fuente Ovejuna (The Sheep Well)	1936	Underhill, John Garrett	Four Plays by Lope de Vega at the Internet Archive	prose & verse
Peribáñez y el Comendador de Ocaña	Peribanez	1937	Price, Eva Rebecca	OCLC 551323573	
El nuevo mundo descubierto por Cristóbal Colón	The discovery of the New World by Christopher Columbus	1950	Fligelman, Frieda	OCLC 1131227626	prose
Fuente Ovejuna	Fuente Ovejuna	1959	Campbell, Roy	Eric Bentley, ed (1959): The Classic Theatre III: Six Spanish Plays at the Internet Archive	blank verse; reprinted in Eric Bentley, ed (1985): Life Is A Dream and Other Spanish Classics at the Internet Archive
Peribáñez y el Comendador de Ocaña	Peribáñez	1961	Booty, Jill	Lope de Vega: Five Plays at the Internet Archive	prose
Fuente Ovejuna	Fuente Ovejuna	1961	Booty, Jill	Lope de Vega: Five Plays at the Internet Archive	prose
El Perro del hortelano	The Dog in the Manger	1961	Booty, Jill	Lope de Vega: Five Plays at the Internet Archive	prose
El caballero de Olmedo	The Knight from Olmedo	1961	Booty, Jill	Lope de Vega: Five Plays at the Internet Archive	prose
El castigo sin venganza	Justice Without Revenge	1961	Booty, Jill	Lope de Vega: Five Plays at the Internet Archive	prose
La dama boba	The Stupid Lady	1962	Jones, Willis Knapp	OCLC 6906774	
Fuente Ovejuna	Fuente Ovejuna	1962	Flores, Angel & Kittel, Muriel	Masterpieces of the Spanish Golden Age at the Internet Archive	prose & verse; reprinted in Great Spanish Plays in English Translation (1991) ISBN 0-486-26898-5
Peribáñez y el Comendador de Ocaña	Peribáñez and the Comendador of Ocaña	1964	Starkie, Walter	Eight Spanish Plays of the Golden Age at the Internet Archive	prose & verse
La Fianza Satisfecha	A Bond Honored	1966	Osborne, John	A Bond Honoured: A Play (from Lope De Vega)	reprinted in Lope de Vega: Plays Two ISBN 978-1840021806
Auto sacramental de la circuncisión y sangría de Cristo nuestro bien	For our sake	1969	Barnes, R[ichard] G.	In Three Spanish sacramental plays: For our sake OCLC 655189012	1-act religious play
Fuente Ovejuna	Fuente Ovejuna	1969	Colford, William E.	OCLC 640113345	
Fuente Ovejuna	All Citizens are Soldiers	1969	Fainlight, Ruth & Sillitoe, Alan	ISBN 9780802312303	
El caballero de Olmedo	The Knight of Olmedo	1972	King, Willard F.	ISBN 0803205007	
La dama boba	The Lady Simpleton	1976	Oppenheimer, Max	ISBN 0872910784	
El mayordomo de la duquesa de Amalfi	The Duchess of Amalfi's Steward	1985	Rodriguez-Badendyck, Cynthia	The Duchess of Amalfi's Steward at the Internet Archive ISBN 0919473539	
Lo fingido verdadero	Acting is Believing	1986	McGaha, Michael	Acting is Believing : A Tragicomedy in Three Acts at the Internet Archive ISBN 0939980142	
El anzuelo de Fenisa	Fenisa's Hook, or, Fenisa the Hooker	1988	Gitlitz, David M.	ISBN 0939980193	
Fuente Ovejuna	Fuente Ovejuna	1989	Mitchell, Adrian	In Two Plays ISBN 0948230231	
El castigo sin venganza	Lost in a Mirror (It Serves Them Right)	1989	Mitchell, Adrian	In Two Plays ISBN 0948230231	
Fuente Ovejuna	Fuente Ovejuna	1989	Dixon, Victor	Fuente Ovejuna at the Internet Archive ISBN 978-0856683282	
Peribáñez y el Comendador de Ocaña	Peribáñez and the Comendador of Ocaña	1990	Lloyd, James	ISBN 978-0856684395	
El Perro del hortelano	The Dog in the Manger	1990	Dixon, Victor	ISBN 0919473741	
Lo fingido verdadero	The Great Pretenders	1992	Johnston, David	Two Plays ISBN 0948230568	
El caballero de Olmedo	The Gentleman from Olmedo	1992	Johnston, David	Two Plays ISBN 0948230568	
Los locos de Valencia	Madness in Valencia	1998	Johnston, David	ISBN 0948230665	
La dama boba	Lady Nitwit	1998	Oliver, William I.	Lady Nitwit at the Internet Archive ISBN 0927534746	
Castalvines y Monteses	Castelvins and Monteses	1998	Rodriguez-Badendyck, Cynthia	ISBN 9781895537390	
Los trabajos de Jacob	The Trials of Jacob; or, Sometimes Dreams Come True	1998	McGaha, Michael	The Story of Joseph in Spanish Golden Age Drama at the Internet Archive ISBN 978-0838753804	prose & verse
Castelvins y Monteses	Castelvins and Monteses	1998	Rodriguez-Badendyck, Cynthia	Carleton Renaissance Plays in Translation, 30 ISBN 978-1895537390	
Fuente Ovejuna	Fuente Ovejuna	1999	Edwards, Gwynne	Lope de Vega: Three Major Plays ISBN 978-0-19-954017-4	blank octosyllables
El caballero de Olmedo	The Knight from Olmedo	1999	Edwards, Gwynne	Lope de Vega: Three Major Plays ISBN 978-0-19-954017-4	blank octosyllables
El castigo sin venganza	Punishment Without Revenge	1999	Edwards, Gwynne	Lope de Vega: Three Major Plays ISBN 978-0-19-954017-4	blank octosyllables
El mejor mozo de España	The Best Boy in Spain	1999	Gitlitz, David M.	The Best Boy in Spain at the Internet Archive ISBN 9780927534857	
La dama boba	Wit's End	2000	Friedman, Edward H.	Wit's End; an adaptation of Lope de Vega's La dama boba ISBN 0820445320	
El Niño Inocente de la Guardia	The Innocent Child	2001	Jacobs, Michael	Lope de Vega: Plays One ISBN 978-1840021448	
Las paces de los reyes y judía de Toledo(?)	The Jewess of Toledo	2001	Jacobs, Michael	Lope de Vega: Plays One ISBN 978-1840021448	
	The Labyrinth of Desire	2001	Jacobs, Michael	Lope de Vega: Plays Two ISBN 978-1840021806	
El nuevo mundo descubierto por Cristóbal Colón	The New World Discovered by Christopher Columbus	2001	Shannon, Robert M.	ISBN 978-0820448848	
Fuente Ovejuna	Fuenteovejuna	2002	Applebaum, Stanley	Fuenteovejuna at the Internet Archive ISBN 978-0486420929	linear prose translation, with Spanish text
El Perro del hortelano	The Dog in the Manger	2004	Johnston, David	ISBN 978-1-84002-435-7	
El mayordomo de la duquesa de Amalfi	The Duchess of Amalfi's Steward	2005	Edwards, Gwynne	Three Spanish Golden Age Plays ISBN 0-413-77475-9	blank octosyllables
Castalvines y Monteses	The Capulets and Montagues	2005	Edwards, Gwynne	Three Spanish Golden Age Plays ISBN 0-413-77475-9	blank octosyllables
Mujeres y criados	Women and Servants	2016	Barbara Fuchs	Juan de la Cuesta-Hispanic Monographs ISBN 978-1588712776	verse
Fuente Ovejuna	Fuenteovejuna	2018	Racz, Gregary J.	The Golden Age of Spanish Drama ISBN 978-0393923629	verse
El Perro del hortelano	The Dog in the Manger	2018	Racz, Gregary J.	The Golden Age of Spanish Drama ISBN 978-0393923629	verse
La viuda valenciana	The Widow of Valencia	2018	UCLA: The Comedia In Translation And Performance	UCLA: The Comedia In Translation And Performance ISBN 978-1588713292	verse
La noche toledana	A Wild Night in Toledo	2018	UCLA: The Comedia In Translation And Performance	UCLA: The Comedia In Translation And Performance ISBN 978-1588713223	verse
Lo fingido verdadero	The Actor and the Emperor or, Make-believe Come True	2020	Matthews, Dakin	UCLA: The Comedia In Translation And Performance ISBN 978-1588713438	verse
El animal de Hungría	The Beast of Hungary	2025	UCLA: The Comedia In Translation And Performance	UCLA: The Comedia In Translation And Performance ISBN 978-1588714121	verse

== Related translations ==
The Star of Seville, previously attributed to Lope but no longer judged to be by him, is not included in this list. English translations include those by Philip M. Hayden (1916) in The Chief European Dramatists at the Internet Archive, Sir Henry Thomas (1935) OCLC 776602053, Elizabeth C. Hullihen (1955) OCLC 1154527390, and Steven Strange (1998) ISBN 9780962877629. Fanny Kemble's five-act 1837 adaptation at the Internet Archive is based on an earlier précis by Lord Holland.

La Dorotea, a genre-bending closet drama or novel in prose dialogue with interspersed poems, is also not included. It was translated by Alan S. Trueblood and Edwin Honig (1985) ISBN 0-674-50590-5.
