= Estelle Skidmore Doremus =

American philanthropist (1830–1905)

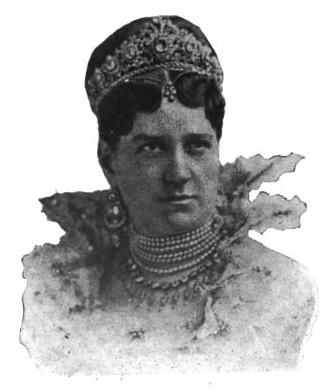
- Born: Estelle Emma Skidmore; May 6, 1830; New York City
- Died: May 21, 1905 (aged 75)
- Resting place: Green-Wood Cemetery, Brooklyn, New York
- Known for: Leader of the American colony in Paris during the reign of Napoleon III
- Title: Regent of the New York City Chapter of the Daughters of the American Revolution, 1892-1894
- Board member of: Daughters of the American Revolution, Underhill Society of America
- Spouse: Robert Ogden Doremus
- Children: Charles Avery Doremus, Thomas Cornelius Doremus, Estelle E. Doremus, Arthur Lispenard Doremus
- Parent(s): Hubbard Skidmore and Caroline Avery

Estelle Emma Doremus (née Skidmore; May 6, 1830 – May 21, 1905) was the daughter of Hubbard Skidmore, who served in the American Revolutionary War, and became a charter member and honorary vice president general of the National Society of the Daughters of the American Revolution (DAR). She was a charter officer and regent of the New York City chapter of the DAR between 1892 and 1894. The wife of U.S. chemist Robert Ogden Doremus, she was a leading member of the American community in Paris during the height of the Second French Empire.

Upon returning to New York City, she and her husband became important figures in society and well-known supporters of music and the arts, including the Philharmonic Society, of which her husband served as president for many years.

== Biography ==
Doremus was born in New York, the daughter of Hubbard Skidmore and Caroline Avery. Hubbard Skidmore was believed to have served at a young age in the American Revolution under guidance from his father, the soldier Zophar Skidmore. On her mother's side Doremus was a granddaughter of Thaddeus Avery, a Revolutionary War soldier.

On October 1, 1850 she married Dr. Robert Ogden Doremus, son of philanthropist Sarah Platt Doremus and Thomas C. Doremus, a merchant, and a Professor of Chemistry at New York City College. In the early 1860s her husband's work took them to Paris, where he advised the French government. Estelle was remembered as "the leader of the American colony in Paris during the most brilliant part of the reign of Napoleon III". Doremus returned to the United States from France following the end of the Civil War. Mrs. Doremus was a friend of many of the great singers and musicians at the time. The Doremuses formerly lived on Fourth Avenue, between 18th and 19th Streets, and later at a family home at 241 Madison Avenue that was frequented by leaders of the musical world.

An issue of the New York Tribune published following her death described the creative and stimulating environment Doremus cultivated:

She had brilliant conversational powers, and a charm of manner which created about her a wide circle of friends. She had a wide acquaintance throughout the country and hosts of distinguished friends abroad. There gathered at her entertainments statesmen, professional men, men of affairs, artists, musicians, actors and others of distinction. These, with their wives and daughters, formed a "salon," in which those who entertained the company with voice or instrumental music.

Following her death on May 21, 1905, at age 75, she was buried in the Green-Wood Cemetery in Brooklyn, New York. A "Memorial Sketch" to Doremus was prepared by David Harris Underhill and read at the Underhill Family Reunion on October 7, 1905.

== Role in lineage societies ==
Doremus went on to participate in a number of organizations including the Daughters of the American Revolution, the Colonial Dames of America, and the Underhill Society of America. She was a member of the Colonial Dames of America and the Daughters of the American Revolution. Estelle was said to be the only member of the New York Chapter of the Daughters of the American Revolution whose father actually served in the Revolution. She was a Regent of the New York Chapter of the Daughters of the American Revolution and honorary Vice President of the National Society.

Doremus was influential in honoring Captain Thaddeus Avery, her maternal grandfather, by placing a plaque at the Avery Homestead in Mount Pleasant, New York. Over 100 people attended the dedication ceremony on 9 June 1900. The plaque read:

Captain Thaddeus Avery was branded with hot irons in this room, and his wife threatened with death by the Hessians, when they refused to divulge the hiding place of the money of the Continental Army. Mrs. Avery baked bread in this oven for the Revolutionary soldiers. This hero and heroine were the grandparents of Mrs. R. Ogden Doremus, Second Regent of the New York City Chapter of Daughters of the American Revolution, which organization affixed this tablet June 9th, 1900.

CAPTAIN THADDEUS AVERY
Born October 30, 1749. Died November 16, 1836.
ELIZABETH UNDERHILL AVERY
Born August 8, 1762. Died May 22, 1841.
"Vicit ites durum pietas"

From 1898 until her death in 1905, Mrs. Doremus served as the second president of the Underhill Society of America, which had been founded in 1892 with the purpose of helping to establish a suitable monument to the memory of Captain John Underhill. Having made insufficient headway with raising the $6,000 in needed funds, her predecessor, William Wilson Underhill, resigned as President of the Underhill Society and as Chairman of the Monument Committee. Doremus took his place as the second president. Doremus made it her objective to find a Chairman for the Monument Committee, and wisely selected Colonel John Torboss Underhill to fill that role.

Following Doremus's death in 1905, John Torboss Underhill succeeded her as the third president. Now as President of the Society and Chairman of the Monument Committee, he felt renewed pressure to raise the additional money needed and proceed with work on the monument. While neither Doremus nor her husband lived to see the results of their labors, a plaque at the base of the Underhill monument recognizes Mrs. Robert Ogden Doremus as one of two "patrons" who supported erection of the monument.

== Family ==
Estelle and Robert Doremus had the following children:

- Charles Avery Doremus (September 6, 1851 – December 2, 1925), chemist. For 22 years he served as a faculty member of the College of the City of New York. He died December 2, 1925 of heart disease.
- Thomas Cornelius Doremus, died of pneumonia on March 25, 1928 (aged 74).
- Estelle E. Doremus (died August 1937), an accomplished musician and member of the Daughters of the American Revolution.
- Arthur Lispenard Doremus, died April 24, 1953 (aged 84).
