= John Garrett Underhill Jr. =

American journalist (1915–1964)

- Born: August 7, 1915; New York City, U.S.
- Died: May 8, 1964 (aged 48); Washington, D.C., U.S.
- Education: Harvard College
- Known for: Captain General Staff World War II, Life magazine correspondent

John Garrett Underhill Jr. (August 7, 1915 – May 8, 1964), also known as Garrett Underhill and Gary Underhill, was a US Army Captain in the General Staff G2 during World War II and received the Army Commendation Medal for meritorious service. He was a Harvard graduate, linguist, and self-taught military affairs expert. For five years, he was a military correspondent for Life magazine and helped to make their Foreign News Department one of the most knowledgeable centers of military intelligence in the world.

== Biography ==
John Garrett Underhill Jr. was born in Brooklyn, the son of John Garrett Underhill Sr. and Louisa Man Wingate, on August 7, 1915. His mother Louisa Man Wingate was the daughter of General George Wood Wingate, who played a role in forming the National Rifle Association. His mother died in 1927, when Underhill was only 12 years old. Underhill went on to study and graduate from Harvard College in 1937. In 1940, it was announced that Underhill was to wed Miss Patricia Semple Dunkerson, a graduate of Vassar College. They were married on June 12 that year at St. Bartholomew's Protestant Episcopal Church.

Underhill served as a Technical Editor and later Chief Editor of the War Department's Military Intelligence Division between July 6, 1943 and May 1946. He was an expert in photography, enemy weapons, and related technical specialities. His role was recognized in a publication of the Memorial Church of All Angels in Twilight Park, Haines Falls, New York. "Report on the Red Army" was a lengthy report written by John Garrett Underhill Jr., under the pseudonym Garrett Underhill. The report was published on October 16, 1949. In the report, it was noted how Garrett Underhill was a writer and editor, and served for 3 1/2 years on the War Department General Staff. It noted how he "is owner of a large private collection of Soviet small arms, acquired during a fifteen-year interest in foreign armaments."

From late 1949 to the mid-1950s, Underhill was an infrequent contact with the office of the Domestic Contact Service of the CIA. In 1951, he wrote a 6500 word essay with Ronald Schiller entitled The Tragedy of the US Army for Look magazine that was published February 13, 1951. After writing the article the Harvard Alumni Bulletin printed Underhill's own words of how he "Got recalled to brown suit service just after finishing a 6500 word article".

Following World War II, Underhill volunteered and served as Deputy Director for the Civil Defense of Washington, D.C. An exercise meant to simulate an evacuation in the event of a hydrogen bomb attack called "Operation Alert" was carried out in 1955. Underhill was outspoken in his criticism of the exercise, stating in the press it was not a "drill but a show". During the exercise he declined heading to the command post for the exercise claiming, it was "so inadequate it couldn't cope with a brushfire threatening a doghouse in a backyard." Samuel Spencer, one of the commissioners who govern the District of Columbia, upon hearing Underhill's criticism ordered his dismissal just as "Operation Alert" began.

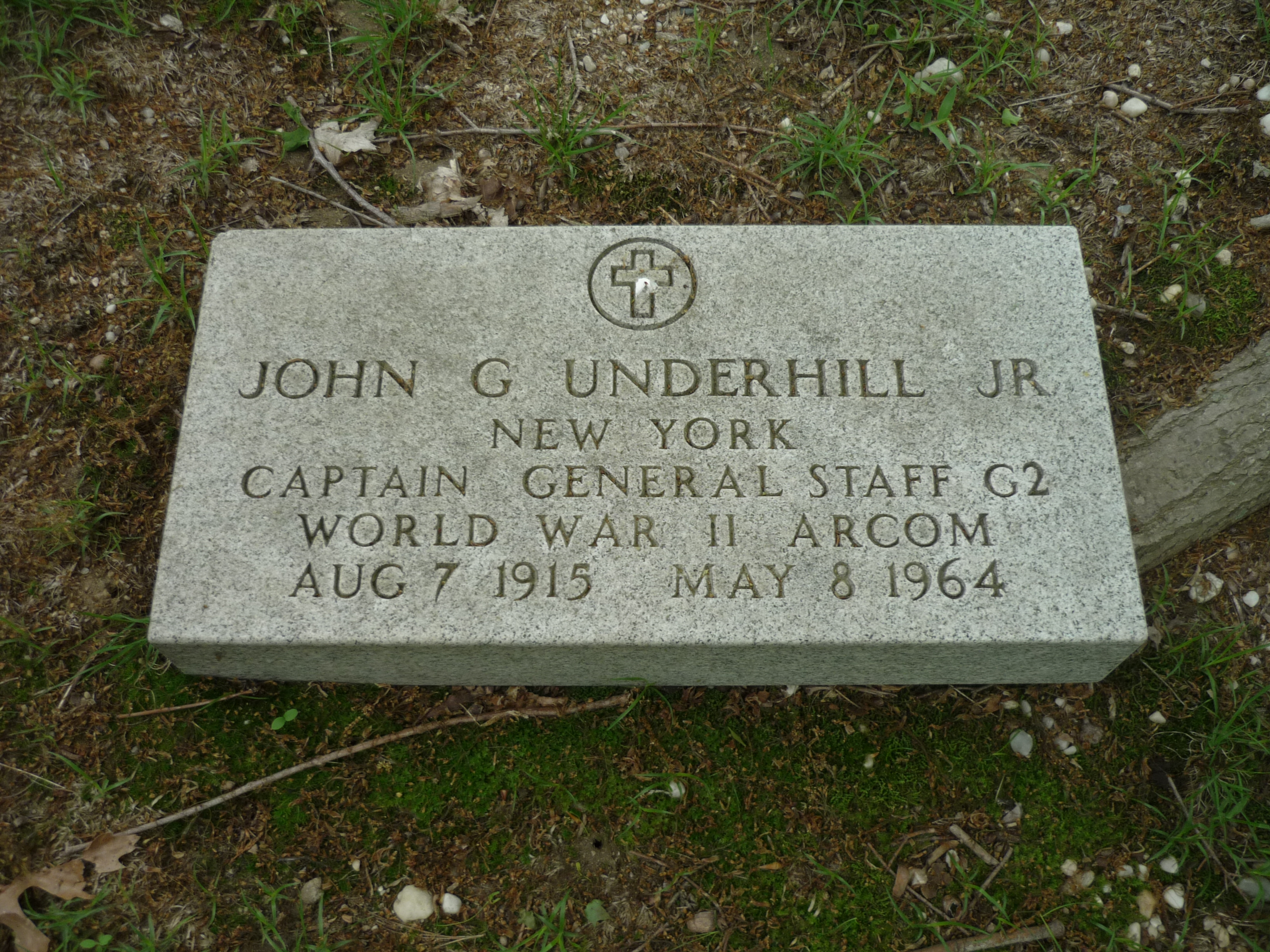
John Garrett Underhill Jr. headstone in the Underhill Burying Ground

Underhill took an active interest in family organizations. One letter from November 1950 expressed his interest in "the revival of the three Underhill organizations." He would have ample opportunity to play a hand in that revival between 1954 and 1956 when he served as president of the Underhill Society of America. Underhill served as a CIA informant and military affairs editor at Life magazine for five years associated with the death of JFK.

== Death ==
CIA document discussing Underhill's death

Jim Garrison, District Attorney from Louisiana conducted an investigation into the assassination of Kennedy. In an interview that Garrison gave for Playboy magazine, he referred to a CIA agent with valuable information pertaining to his investigation. The name of Gary Underhill was used interchangeably in sources with John Garrett Underhill. A Memorandum from the CIA to the Justice Department in 1967 referred to the interview and John Garrett Underhill Jr. in some detail:

15. Who is the J. Garrett UNDERHILL referred to in Garrison's Playboy interview as a former CIA agent?
UNDERHILL was born 7 August 1915 in Brooklyn, was graduated from Harvard in 1937, and shot to death on 8 May 1964. He served with the Military Intelligence Service from 6 July 1943 to May 1946 as an expert in photography, enemy weapons, and related technical specialities. He was in infrequent contact with the New York office of the Domestic Contact Service, of CIA from late 1949 to the mid-'50s. The contact was routine. Mr. UNDERHILL was not an employee of CIA.

CIA agent Gary Underhill, again, a name used interchangeably with John Garrett Underhill Jr., was said to have a connection with Harold Isaacs who in turn knew Oswald's cousin Marilyn Murret. Reportedly after Kennedy's assassination Underhill feared for his life and confided to friends that a clique within the CIA was responsible. Prior to Garrison being able to meet and interview Underhill, he was found in bed with a bullet wound behind his left ear on May 8, 1964. Sources differ on whether the cause of his death was suicide or if people or groups had motivations to see him removed because he had secret information that he threatened to divulge. His death certificate from the District of Columbia Department of Public Health listed the cause of death as "shot self in head with automatic pistol." He died on May 8, 1964, at his home on 3035 M St, NW in Washington, D.C. After his death, he was buried in the Underhill Burying Ground in Lattingtown, New York. His body was found by writing-collaborator Asher Byrnes of The New Republic who found his death suspicious as, according to Byrnes, Underhill was right-handed but he was shot in the left side of his head.

His wife, Patricia D. Underhill, died on December 15, 1973. A memorial service was held in her memory at Christ Church, Washington, D.C. John Garrett Underhill III lived at 10220 Memorial Dr. in Houston, Texas. An obituary for him ran in the March 22, 1987, issue of the Houston Chronicle, Section 2, Page 15.
