= United States Fire Insurance Company of New York =

Defunct insurer

- Type: Fire Insurance
- Industry: Finance and Insurance
- Founded: April 9, 1824
- Headquarters: 46 Pine Street, New York City, U.S.
- Key people: William Wilson Underhill Abraham S. Underhill Joshua S. Underhill
- Products: Fire Insurance
- Services: Insurance

The United States Fire Insurance Company of New York was an insurance company formed on April 9, 1824, with a capital stock of $250,000. The company grew to become an important provider of insurance nationwide, before ceasing operations some time after the 1970s.

== History ==
The United States Fire Insurance Company of New York commenced business on April 9, 1824, with a capital stock of $250,000. The Principal Office for the company was located at 46 Pine Street in New York City.

Joshua Sutton Underhill served as President of the company from 1849 until his death in 1858 at the age of 55. Elected to replace him was his younger brother, Abraham Sutton Underhill, who served as President for a further 25 years. At the time of Joshua's death and Abraham's election, their nephew, W. Wilson Underhill began working as a clerk in insurance commissions. In 1862 he was appointed to the position of Assistant Secretary at the company, becoming Secretary in 1865. He was elected President of the company in 1882 following Abraham's death the previous December, a position he held for 26 years until his retirement in 1908.

A war among insurance companies around 1898 caused a committee of 15 New York-based insurance companies to be formed, and to organize a tariff association. E.C. Irvin of the Fire Association of Philadelphia said at the time, "Rates at first were made so high as to invite and foster unfair and illegitimate competition, loose practices, private deals, broken agreements, and at last utter demoralization." A meeting in September 1898 called for an association to rate and govern the fire insurance businesses in New York City. William Wilson Underhill was involved in discussions leading to formation of the tariff association, given his role as President of the United States Fire Insurance Company. Underhill was subsequently elected as Secretary for the Fire Insurance Tariff Committee. The work of the committee would be favorably received, resulting in the withdrawal of other smaller fire insurance companies and a large loss ratio of the company during the last two months of 1898.

The company had net assets of $626,049.95 on December 31, 1901, with total income of $657,078.71 and total disbursements of $542,952.28.

The new century brought with it expansion into new areas across the country. Southwestern General Managers were appointed representatives for the United States Fire Insurance Company of New York for a new venture in Houston, Texas. At times other companies reinsured the outstanding insurance of the United States Fire Insurance Company of New York. Such was the case in 1903, when the National Fire Insurance Company of Hartford reinsured all the risks of the United States Fire Insurance Company of New York in Iowa.

In 1904, H.G. Fairfield & Co. were appointed Boston agents of the United States Fire Insurance Company of New York, to succeed Prescott Chamberlain.

A troubling sign emerged around 1906, when the United States Fire Insurance Company of New York decided to stop underwriting. An article in The New York Times stated, "This stoppage is understood to be only temporary, and until the capital of the company has been reinforced." Their assets at the time had risen to $814,180 and its net surplus was $60,330.

The United States Fire Insurance Company of New York stayed in operation as late as 1977 before eventually ceasing operations.
