= Willard Underhill Taylor =

American lawyer

- Born: 1868
- Died: April 18, 1940 (aged 71–72)
- Resting place: Locust Valley Cemetery, Locust Valley, New York, U.S.
- Occupations: Lawyer, real estate investor
- Known for: Brother of noted industrialist Myron Charles Taylor
- Board member of: Underhill Society of America

Willard Underhill Taylor (1868–1940) was a lawyer, New York City real estate investor, and brother of Myron Charles Taylor. Willard was also a member of the Saint Nicholas Society of the City of New York and the President of the Underhill Society of America between 1932 and 1940.

== Biography ==
Willard Underhill Taylor participated in the twenty-third Annual Commencement of Cornell University on June 18, 1891. Taylor, then of Lyons, New York, gave a commencement speech on "Progressive Americanism." That day he received a Bachelor of Philosophy as well as a "Certificate for proficiency in military science." The New York Times incorrectly referred to him as Willard N. Underhill. He was one of 250 degree earners to receive degrees that day from University President Adams.

The Taylors had homes in both New York City and on Long Island. A "Supper Dance" at their home in Garden City for their daughter Mary M. Taylor, received coverage in The New York Times, owing to the impressive list of guests who attended.

Taylor became an active player in the New York City real estate market starting in the late 1920s. One of his first important purchases was the Holland-Plaza Building, erected on a site owned by Trinity Church Corporation near the entrance to the Holland Tunnel. He acquired a twenty-story building in New York City, at 423-27 Fourth Avenue, on the northeast corner of 29th Street in 1934 for over $1,000,000. The property was bought by Mr. Taylor through one of his holding companies, the Lortay Corporation. Building records show how 423-27 4th Ave was originally built in 1927 for $900,000 and was a 20 story terra cotta clad building with stores and offices.

Taylor through his Lortay Corporation leased two more buildings, 100 Sixth Avenue and 345 Hudson Street, both in the Holland Tunnel plaza area, from Trinity Church Corporation in 1934.

In 1936, the Taylor's acquired the Reginald Barclay seashore estate at North Haven called Ettington, where they made their summer home. Taylor was a lawyer and had offices at 74 Trinity Place in Manhattan.

Willard Underhill Taylor, Sr., died in 1940. Among the associations he was involved in was the Saint Nicholas Society of the City of New York. His passing was recognized in a death notice in the New York Times. The death of Willard Underhill Taylor was noted in a 1940 issue of Time magazine. Myron Charles Taylor erected a substantial headquarters for the Boy and Girl Scouts of the Lyons area in memory of his two brothers Willard Underhill Taylor and Morgan Delling Taylor. Willard is buried in Locust Valley Cemetery, Locust Valley, New York.

== Family ==
Willard Underhill Taylor married Evelyn W. Keeler of Auburn, New York, on May 20, 1923. He and his wife had several children including Willard Underhill Taylor, Jr., Mary M. Taylor, and Annette Taylor. Following the death of Willard Underhill Taylor, his wife remarried F. Kenneth Stephenson on April 27, 1941. Following the death of her second husband, Evelyn Keeler relocated to San Antonio, Texas. She died on December 24, 1966, in Mexico City. Her funeral service was held in the Chapel of the Resurrection in the Cathedral of the Incarnation, in Garden City, on January 2, 1967.

Annette Taylor died at the age of 13, when the sedan her governess Etta Dale Milliken was driving turned over veered off the road and turned over three miles north of East Hampton. Her brother Willard Underhill Taylor, Jr., was riding in the back seat at the time and escaped uninjured.

Willard Underhill Taylor, Jr., served for four years in the Navy on underwater demolition during World War II. Because his father, Willard Underhill, Jr., was brother of Myron Charles Taylor, this made Willard Underhill Taylor a nephew. Willard Underhill Taylor, Jr. married Katherine Dickey Stevens on April 30, 1948. That marriage ended in divorce some time prior to 1956 when Stevens remarried. Stevens died at the age of 42 after a long illness. At the time of death she was living at 215 East 68th Street and getting treatment in the Harkness Pavilion, Columbia-Presbyterian Medical Center.

== Participation in Underhill Society ==
Following the death of Willard Underhill Taylor, Sr., his brother Myron Charles Taylor was proposed as a Director for the Underhill Society. Despite actively being involved in affairs of the Underhill Society, Taylor declined. Following the death of John Garrett Underhill, Sr., who served as President of the Underhill Society, Myron Charles Taylor speculated about the possibility of placing the Underhill Society and Underhill Burying Ground under the control of the Nassau County Historical Society.
