= Underhill Burying Ground =

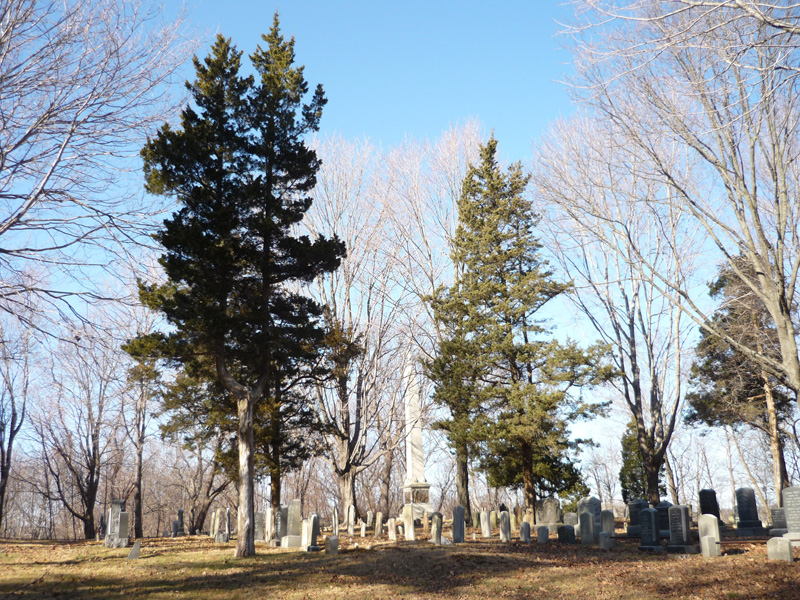
- Underhill Burying Ground with obelisk monument honoring Captain John Underhill near the center.
- Interactive map of Underhill Burying Ground

Details
- Established: 1672
- Location: Lattingtown, New York
- Country: United States
- Coordinates: 40°53′25″N 73°34′24″W
- Type: Historical
- Owned by: Underhill Burying Ground, Inc.
- No. of graves: Approx. 300

The Underhill Burying Ground is a cemetery located within the Village of Lattingtown, in the Town of Oyster Bay in Nassau County, New York. The cemetery has been in continuous operation since the burial of Captain John Underhill in 1672. The Underhill Burying Ground is governed by the Underhill Burying Ground, Inc., a non-profit organization, incorporated under the laws of the State of New York.

== Origins and history ==
The Underhill Burying Ground is located upon a portion of approximately 150 acres (0.61 km^{2}) that was granted by Lenape Native Americans to English colonist Captain John Underhill in 1667. This area was originally called Matinecock, after the village of one of the Lenape bands. Today it is within the Village of Lattingtown. Captain John Underhill was buried here on his own land in 1672. Family descendants in 1843 created an organization to manage and protect the family burying ground for their continued use.

The Underhill Society of America commissioned an imposing obelisk and monument, which was erected on the burial site of Captain John Underhill on May 18, 1907. The Society paid $6,000 for the monument. They arranged to reinter the "fighting captain" in its foundation. Made of white polished granite, the obelisk is topped by a bronze eagle with extended wings and perched on a bronze ball. On each side of the six-foot (1.8 m) square base are four bronze tablets depicting the life of Underhill.

Colonel John T. Underhill, then president of the Underhill Society of America, invited President Theodore Roosevelt to attend a formal ceremony to dedicate the monument. A letter from Roosevelt on April 3, 1908, accepted the invitation and agreed to "say a few words." At the dedication ceremony on July 11, 1908, Roosevelt gave an address on "A Good Soldier and a Good Citizen". The President talked about the duties of citizenship as exemplified by the Underhill family. He denounced socialism and expressed his views on the proper regulation of private business fortunes.

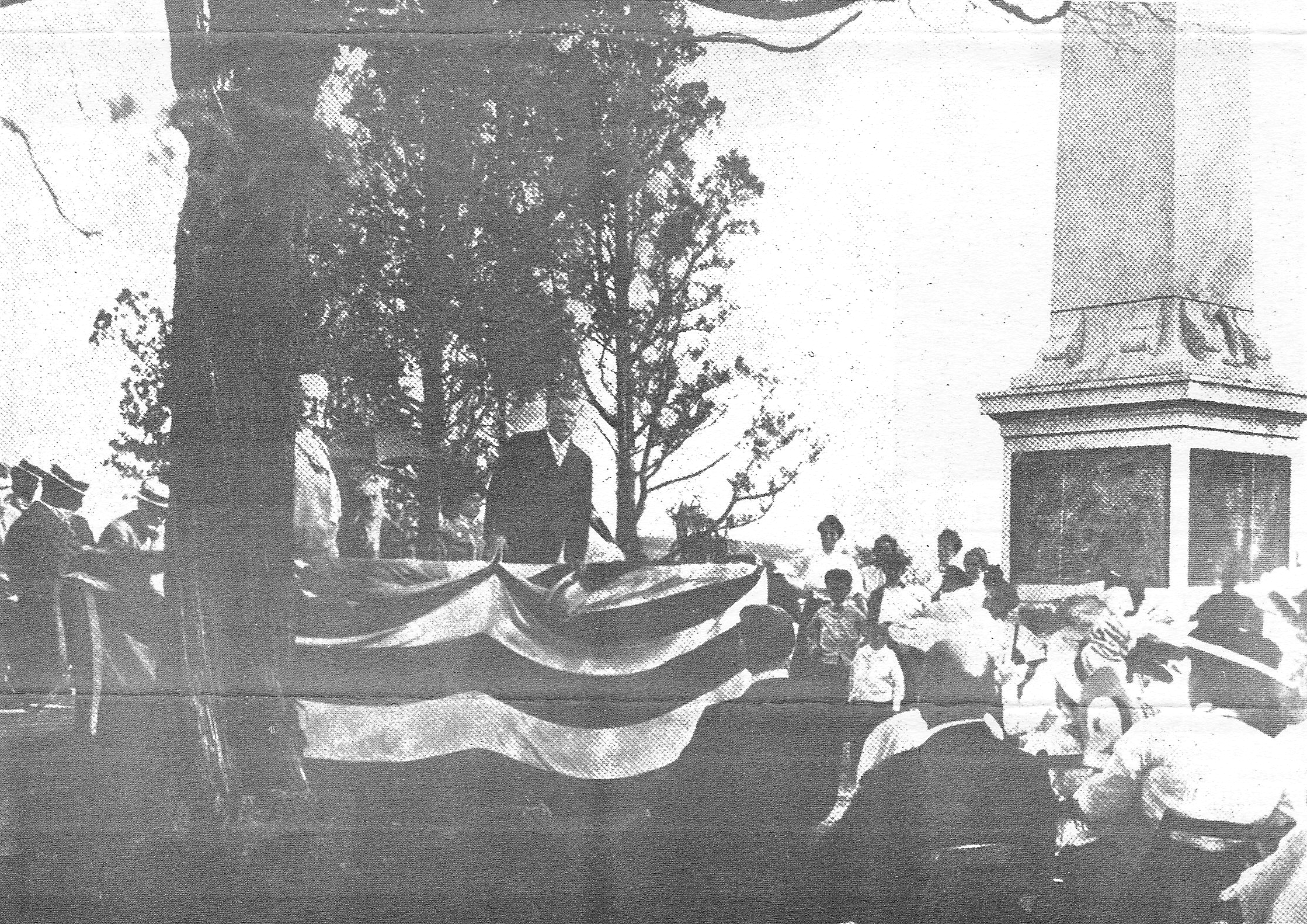
President Theodore Roosevelt at the dedication of the Captain John Underhill monument, July 11, 1908.

The main bronze informational plaque on the monument has the following inscription:

Captain John Underhill
Statesman Soldier
Born Baginton, Warwickshire, England, Oct. 7, 1597
Died Matinecock, Long Island, July 21, 1672

Coming to America in 1630, Underhill became prominent in the government of the colonies and achieved a high reputation as a soldier in the war with the Indians. To his memory this monument is erected by the Underhill Society of America as a tribute of respect and esteem to the founder of the family in America, May 18, 1907.

Also included on the plaque were names of the Underhill Society of America members at the time of the monument dedication. These included Col. John Torboss Underhill, President; Walter Lispenard Suydam, First Vice President; Edward King, Second Vice President; Daniel Oscar Underhill, Third Vice President; David Harris Underhill, Cor. Sec. & Family Historian; Mrs. Marianna Underhill Cocks, Asst. Cor. Secretary; Silas Albertson Underhill, Recording Secretary; Edward DeLacey Underhill, Asst. Rec. Secretary; George William Cocks, Honorary Secretary; Irving Underhill, Treasurer; Reuben Howes Underhill, Counsel.

Names of members of the Monument Committee were also included on the plaque. These included: Colonel John T. Underhill, Chairman; Hon. John Quincy Adams Underhill; Francis Jay Underhill; Charles Munson Underhill; Irving Underhill; Caleb Fowler Underhill; William Anderson Underhill. Patrons who supported the erection of the monument were also listed on the plaque and included Mrs. Robert Ogden Doremus and Mrs. Lydia Greene Lawrence.

The Underhill Burying Ground, Inc. was incorporated under the laws of the State of New York in 1909.

Myron C. Taylor, a descendant of Captain John Underhill, was instrumental in assuring perpetual maintenance of the Underhill Burying Ground by establishing a fund whose interest is used to maintain the cemetery. Descendants of Captain John Underhill may purchase burial rights by submitting an application to the Secretary of the Underhill Burying Ground, Inc.

== Records of burials ==
The research document Historic Cemeteries of Oyster Bay lists 124 known interments at the Underhill Burying Ground. Surnames with multiple burials follow by order of prevalence: Underhill (42), Feeks (17), Cocks (15), Golden (9), Cox (8), Parish (4), Udall (4), Feekes (3), Latting (3), Fekes (2), Heley (2), Fisher (2), and Secker (2). The following surnames have only one known burial: Cashow, Cock, Cozzens, Dickson, Hicks, Miller, Sweet, Thorne, Weeks, Wilbur, and Wilbus.

The Underhill Burying Ground, Inc. has kept extensive records of all burials. Detailed surveys have also been completed, including one by Mary Jane Layton Lippert in March 1998. The Lippert report documented 310 burials, several of which were listed simply as "Unknown".
