= Roselle Knott =

Canadian actress

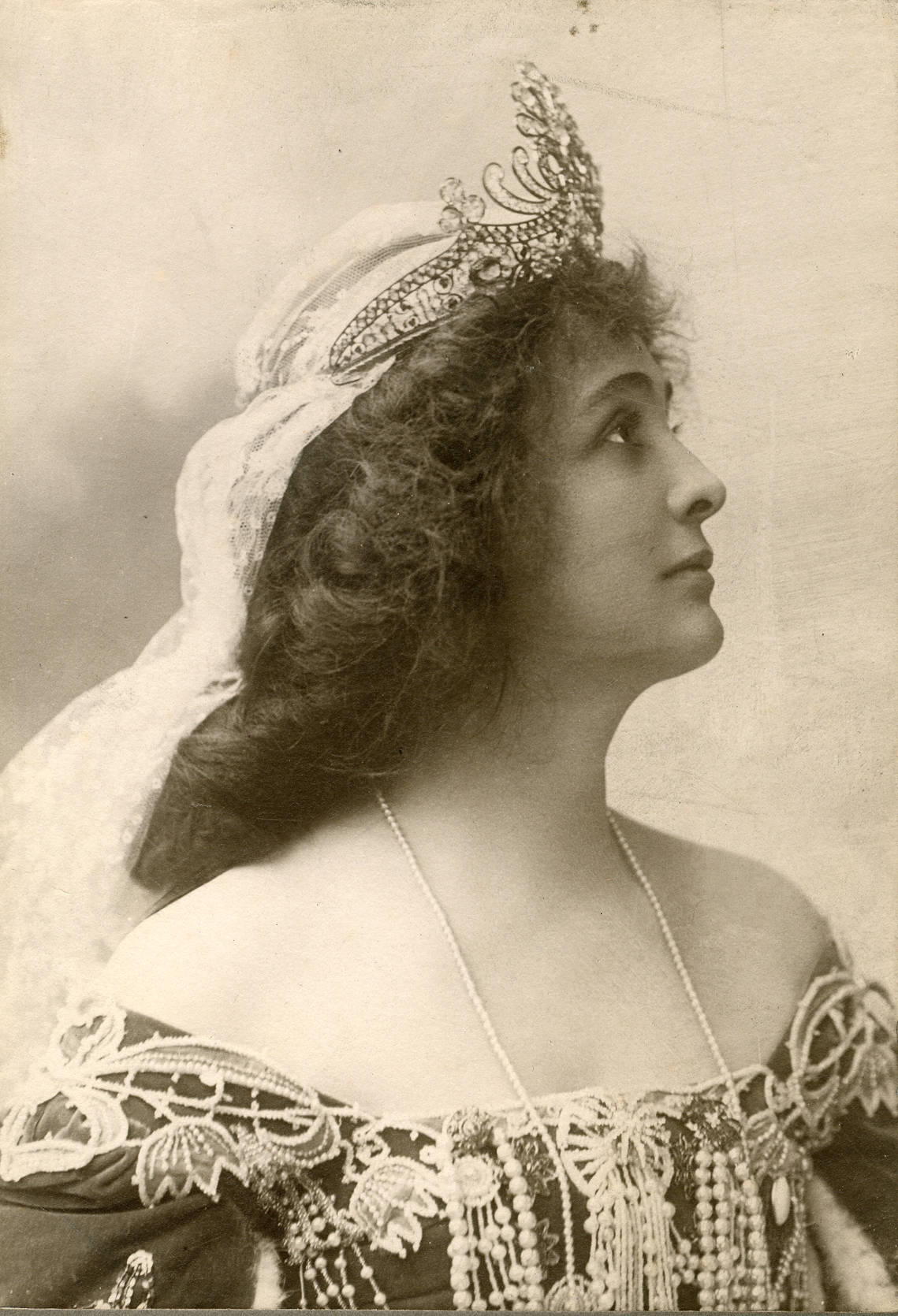
- Roselle Knott, photographed in 1905 by the Otto Sarony Company.
- Born: Agnes Jane Roselle; March 19, 1865; Hamilton, Canada West
- Died: January 28, 1948 (aged 82); Hamilton, Ontario
- Other name: Agnes Jane Shipman
- Occupation: Actress

Roselle Knott (born Agnes Roselle; March 19, 1865 – January 28, 1948), was a Canadian actress.

== Early life ==
Agnes Roselle was born in Ancaster, Hamilton, Canada West, the daughter of Abraham Rossell and Agnes Jane McDavid Rossell. (Birth years vary across sources, from 1863 to 1870.)

== Career ==
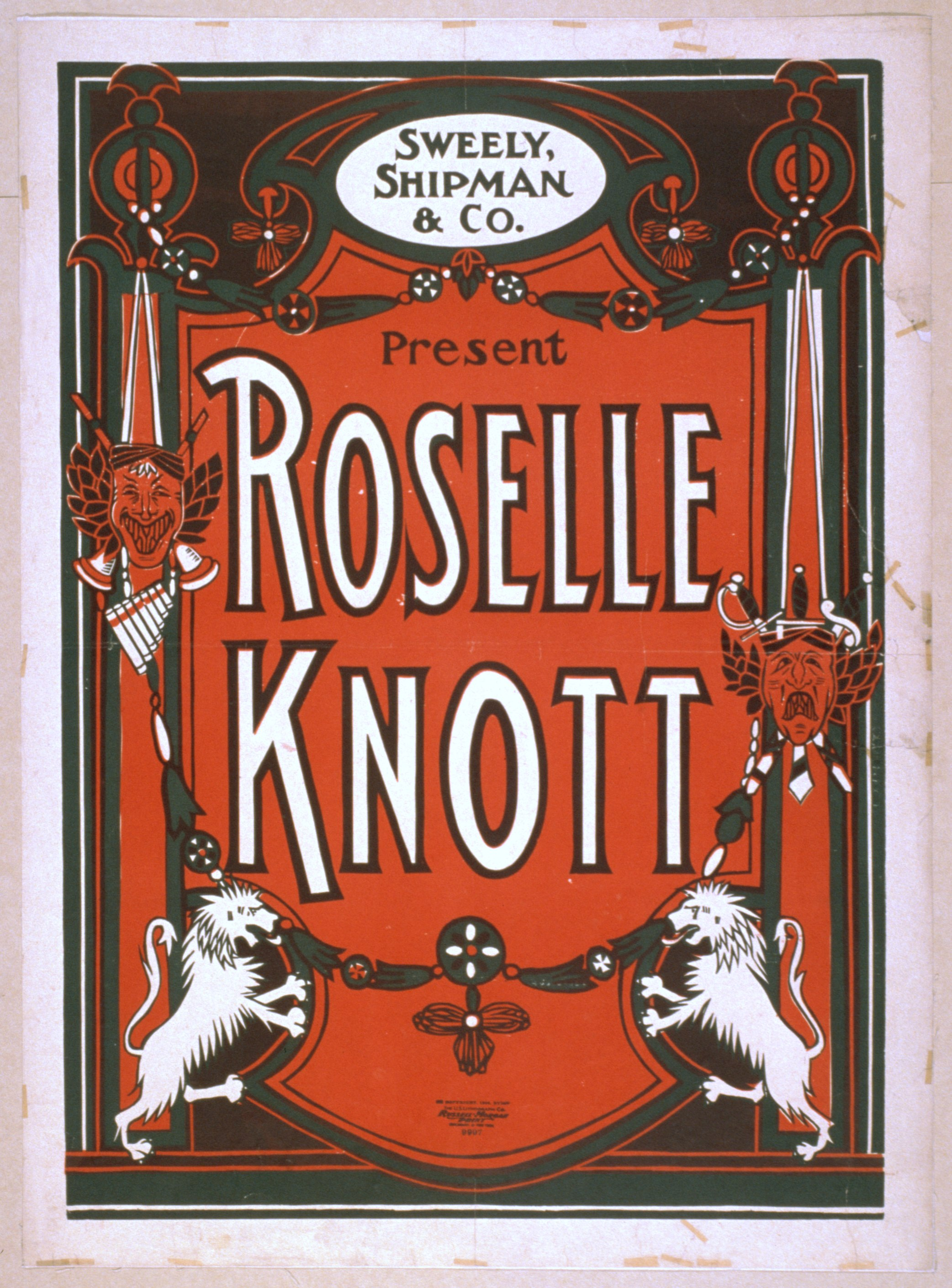
1906 poster announcing an appearance by Roselle Knott.

Roselle Knott began her stage career in Canada, at the Hamilton Academy of Music. In 1893 she debuted in New York, in a production of Shakespeare's As You Like It. She also appeared that year in an all-women cast of As You Like It, as a member of the Women's Professional League. In 1900, she starred in Quo Vadis at the Empire Theatre, and on tour in Chicago and Boston. Knott toured with Richard Mansfield's company in A Parisian Romance and Beau Brummel. She succeeded Julia Marlowe in the role of Mary Tudor in When Knighthood was in Flower by Charles Major, from 1902 to 1903. In 1906, she played the title role in The Duchess of Devonshire, written for her by Elizabeth Johnson Ward Doremus.

Knott was on stage in Logansport, Indiana in 1906, appearing in Alice Sit-by-the-Fire by James Barrie, when a fire began in the backstage. She was credited with calmly continuing her performance to prevent a panic, and no audience members died.

Knott retired from the stage in 1907, after a tour of Australia with her second husband's company. However, she was back to acting by 1911, playing older Shakespearean roles, including Lady Macbeth. In 1912 she toured North America in The Awakening of Helena Richie, and reportedly set off "a sort of Roselle Knott epidemic", as the name Roselle was given to new babies in the cities she visited: "I like the name myself, and do not wonder that mothers give it to their girl babies," she told 1912 newspaper.

She directed plays in Hamilton, and moved to New York City to start her own company in 1916. Knott retired again from acting in 1936, but after that taught acting in New York City. Among her students were Robert Montgomery and Miriam Hopkins.

== Personal life ==
Agnes Roselle married actor Thomas Knott in 1884. They had three children: Ivey, Viola, and Thomas Jr. Ivey died in infancy in 1885. Thomas Knott Sr. died in a sports accident in 1896. She married again in 1907, to theatrical producer Ernest George Montague Shipman. They divorced in 1912; he married young actress Nell Shipman soon after. Roselle Knott died in 1948, aged 82 years, in Hamilton. One of the many babies named for Roselle was her granddaughter, Roselle Heaps DeCarli (1930–2002).
