= Francis Jay Underhill =

- Born: 30 April 1863
- Died: 21 May 1938 (aged 75)
- Occupation: Bond broker
- Employer(s): Fisk & Robinson, J. & W. Seligman & Co.

Francis Jay Underhill (1863-1938) was a writer, amateur musician, and American bond broker with two firms, Fisk & Robinson and later with J. & W. Seligman & Co., that played a leading role in the financing and construction of the Panama Canal. Owing to his commercial success, Underhill was a collector of art and musical instruments, including many engravings, etchings, and lithographs of noted European and American artists. Underhill was an amateur musician and acquired an Antonio Stradivari violin of 1732 called the "Red Diamond." Underhill was also 4th President of the Underhill Society of America.

== Biography ==
Francis Jay Underhill was born April 30, 1863, in Chelsea, Massachusetts. In 1880 he worked as a clerk in the Blackstone National Bank in Boston, Massachusetts, and later in Chelsea. In 1881 he moved to Buffalo, New York, and worked for the Standard Oil Company. While in Buffalo, Underhill married Eliza Corning Otto.

After working for Standard Oil for several years, he struck out on his own in business as a manufacturer and wholesale dealer of pine and hardwood lumber between 1885 and 1900, under the name F.J. Underhill & Co. He continued in this role until around February 2, 1898. Facing financial difficulties, he relocated to New York City and became engaged in banking with Fisk & Robinson and later with J. & W. Seligman & Co. He was a delegate to the American Convention of Bankers held in New Orleans, Louisiana, in 1902, reflecting his status.

Francis Jay Underhill and his wife had one child, Helen Underhill, who was born on March 9, 1890, in Buffalo, New York, and died as a toddler on June 18, 1892.

Following the death of his first wife in 1919, Underhill married his Hendrika Charlotte de Gee (18 Dec 1887-17 Apr 1985) of The Hague ('s-Gravenhage), The Netherlands, on October 17, 1928. Hendrika was the daughter of Charles Isaac de Gee and Sara Anthonetta (de Pril) de Gee of The Hague, The Netherlands. Underhill and Hendrika married in London at St. Mary Abbots, Kensington on High Street.

Letters that Francis Jay Underhill wrote to Irving Underhill are held by the Underhill Society of America. They present a travelogue of places he visited in Europe leading to his wedding in London. A May 25, 1928 postcard was sent from London, a July 10 letter from The Hague, and an October 12, 1928 letter from London. These letters also recounted Taylor Underhill's search in England and Holland for material pertaining to the Underhill family.

Underhill was a member of Grace Church, Broadway and Tenth Street in Manhattan, the Holland Society, Union League Club, Saint Nicholas Society in the City of New York, New England Historical and Genealogical Society, Garden City Golf Club, and Saint Andrews Golf Club.

== Participation in Underhill Society of America ==
In 1900 he was on the committee that helped to plan the 8th reunion of the Underhill Society of America that met in Locust Valley, New York.

In his capacity as Vice-President of the Underhill Society of America, he was actively involved in efforts to erect a memorial in honor of Captain John Underhill at the Underhill Burying Ground, succeeding in 1907. When the monument was formally dedicated on July 11, 1908, Francis Jay Underhill was responsible for giving the speech of acceptance. This was just prior to the formal comments delivered by President Theodore Roosevelt.

Underhill served as 4th President of the Underhill Society of America between 1924 and 1932. He also worked with David Harris Underhill to compile materials for The Underhill Burying Ground. These two men compiled and edited materials for The Underhill Burying Ground: An account of a Parcel of Land situate at Locust Valley, Long Island, New York, deeded by the Matinecock Indians, February twentieth, sixteen hundred and sixty-seven, to Captain John Underhill, for Meritorious Service and known as the Underhill Burying Ground. This book was published in 1926.

Between 1927 and 1930, Underhill worked with other descendants, s among those people, including William Wilson Underhill, E. Steward Underhill, Willard Underhill Taylor, and Myron Charles Taylor, to commission Henry C. Shelley in writing a book, John Underhill: Captain of New England New Netherland. This book was eventually published in 1932. A separate work was commissioned and written by John H. Morrison and entitled The Underhills of Warwickshire. This book by Morrison was published contemporaneously with Shelley's work.

== Death and bequests ==
Underhill died May 21, 1938, at his residence at 129 Columbia Heights. Brooklyn, New York. Upon his death instructions were provided to give his widow, Henriette Charlotte of Scheveningen, Holland, $20,000 in trust for life. For his housekeeper, Mary Ewel, who resided at 129 Columbia Heights, he left a trust fund of $10,000. Janette Corning Otto of Buffalo, sister of his first deceased wife, received a $4,000 trust fund. He left $2,000 to the Children's Hospital of Buffalo and $1,000 in trust to provide a perpetual fund for toys for the Christmas Manger Service of Grace Church, Manhattan. Trust funds of $3,000 each were bequeathed to nieces, Helen Sampson Fish of Germantown, Pennsylvania, and Elizabeth F. Cook of Haddonfield, New Jersey, and to Mrs. Johanna Sandstand of Bornholm, Denmark.

The Library of the Late Francis Jay Underhill was published in catalog format following his death and numbered over 52 pages. From his library, 217 volumes, including a 48-volume set of the works of Sir Walter Scott, found their way to the Boston Public Library.

Owing to his commercial success, Underhill was also a collector of antiques and art objects. Following his death, his estate gave many items to the Boston Museum of Fine Arts.

Two violins, one by Antonio Stradivari (1732), known as the "Red Diamond," were also donated to the Boston Museum of Fine Arts.

Underhill also left an estate of more than $10,000 in personal property, which was given to the president and fellows of Harvard College.
