= Charles Avery Doremus =

American chemist

- Born: 6 September 1851; New York City
- Died: December 2, 1925 (aged 74)
- Education: College of the City of New York (1870); University of Heidelberg (Ph.D., 1872)
- Occupation: chemist

Charles Avery Doremus (6 September 1851 in New York City – 2 December 1925 in New York City) was an American chemist.

== Early life and education ==
Charles Avery Doremus was the son of chemist and physician Robert Ogden Doremus. He graduated from the College of the City of New York in 1870, and subsequently studied in the universities of Leipzig and Heidelberg, receiving the degree of Ph.D. from Heidelberg in 1872.

== Career ==
In 1877 Doremus became professor of chemistry and toxicology in the medical department of the University at Buffalo, which office he held until 1882, when he became assistant to the chair of chemistry and physics in the College of the City of New York. Meanwhile, he had received the appointments in New York City of lecturer on practical chemistry and toxicology in Bellevue Hospital Medical College, and professor of chemistry in the American Veterinary College. The chemical laboratories in these institutions, excepting Bellevue, were organized under his direction.

Doremus made a specialty of medical chemistry and toxicology, and was frequently called into courts as an expert in such matters. He was chemist to the Medico-Legal Society, and a member of the chemical societies of Berlin, Paris, and New York City, and for some time edited the journal of the latter society. He wrote frequent papers on sanitary chemistry and methods of analysis, which appeared in the proceedings of the societies to which he belonged, and he is the author of a “Report on Photography,” contributed to the U. S. government reports on the Exhibition held in Vienna in 1873.

He was a holder of patents for a process for softening water, for a gas furnace, for producing hydrofluoric acid, for extracting alumina from clay and for the extraction of potash from feldspar.

== Personal life ==
Doremus married playwright Elizabeth Johnson Ward in 1880, in Washington, D.C. They had two sons who died in infancy, and a daughter, Katherine. Doremus died in 1925, aged 74 years, in New York.
