= Louis Doremus Huntoon =

American mining engineer

Louis Doremus Huntoon, E.M., M.A. (1869–1937) was an American mining engineer, born at Paterson, New Jersey, and educated at the New York College of Pharmacy and the School of Mines of Columbia University (1895). He was employed as a chemist and assayer in Colorado in 1895-96 and mining and metallurgical engineer in New York in 1896-1903, and he remained in New York afterwards. He became consulting engineer in New York City after 1911.
