= Underhill Society of America =

- Formation: June 16, 1892
- Headquarters: 30 West Main St, Oyster Bay, New York, U.S.
- Region served: United States
- President: Jay Tucker
- Staff: 1 archivist
- Website: www.underhillsociety.org

The Underhill Society of America is a non-profit family genealogical society that was organized in Brooklyn, New York City, on June 16, 1892. The society was incorporated in 1903. The purpose of the Underhill Society of America is to perpetuate the memory of Captain John Underhill and his descendants. Captain John Underhill was an important figure in Colonial America, having arrived from England in 1630 to form the colonial militia of the Massachusetts Bay Colony. He and his descendants served in important roles in American life from the military, to politics, business, finance, and industry.

Myron Charles Taylor, an Underhill descendant and one time Chairman and CEO of U.S. Steel, made a major bequest to support the work of the Underhill Society of America and related organizations, including the Underhill Burying Ground and the New York Genealogical and Biographical Society. The Underhill Society of America collected and makes available information on genealogy, biography, and history, particularly as it relates to Captain John Underhill and his descendants. Their extensive archive is available to view by appointment at 30 West Main Street in Oyster Bay, New York. The society also publishes periodicals and books, holds an annual meeting at different locations throughout the United States, and maintains an archive for the benefit of those seeking to conduct research and learn more about the Underhill family.

== History ==
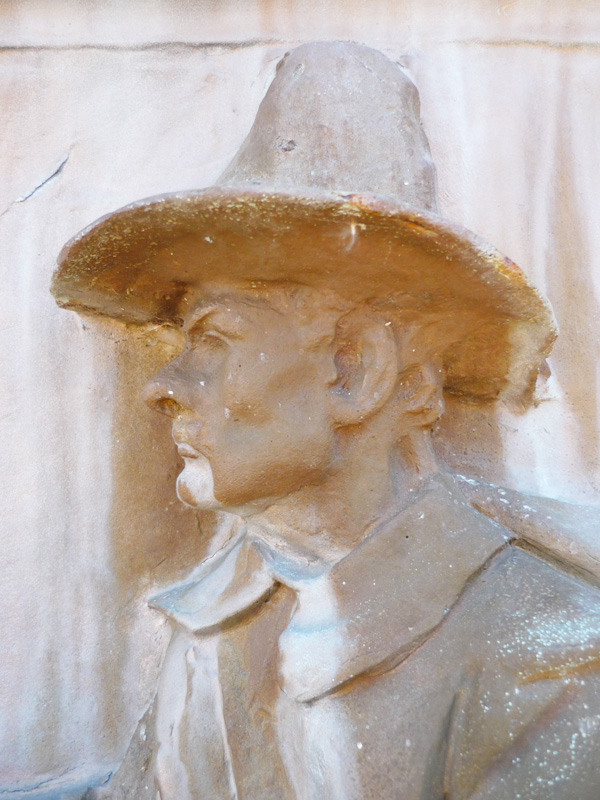
Artist depiction of Captain John Underhill.

=== Founding ===
John Underhill (1597 – 1672) was an early English settler and soldier in the Massachusetts Bay Colony, the Province of New Hampshire, the New Haven Colony, New Netherland, and later the Province of New York. From Baginton, Captain John Underhill died on 21 July 1672 and was buried on his own land on what is now the Underhill Burying Ground in Locust Valley, New York. Thomas Stewardson, Jr., made a pilgrimage on October 22, 1868 to discover the burial site of Captain John Underhill. During this visit he made a sketch of the site, a copy of which he later conveyed to William Underhill, Esq. of Wimbledon, England. In it Stewardson referred to "This pretty, but neglected graveyard" and how he "heard whilst there, of an intention to erect a Monument over the remains of 'Fighting John.'" Twenty four years later, the Underhill Society of America was founded in Brooklyn, New York, in 1892 by David Harris Underhill and other descendants of Captain John Underhill. The purpose of the Underhill Society of America initially was to establish a monument at the gravesite of the immigrant ancestor.

=== Erecting monument at Underhill Burying Ground ===
William Wilson Underhill was selected as the first president of the Underhill Society of America and also chairman of the Monument Committee. By the time of their third meeting in 1893, discussion centered on "erecting a monument to the memory of the Captain at his resting place near Glen Cove." Having failed to raise sufficient funds toward the $6,000 needed for the monument, William Wilson Underhill resigned as president of the Underhill Society and as chairman of the Monument Committee. Estelle Skidmore Doremus took his place as the second president, serving from 1898 to 1905.

Doremus also recruited a new chairman for the Monument Committee. She selected Colonel John Torboss Underhill to take on that role. Following Mrs. Doremus' death in 1905, Underhill succeeded her as president of the family society. He carried out fundraising to proceed with work on the monument. Names on a plaque at the base of the monument recognize the role of Mrs. Robert Ogden Doremus as one of two "Patrons" who supported erection of the monument.

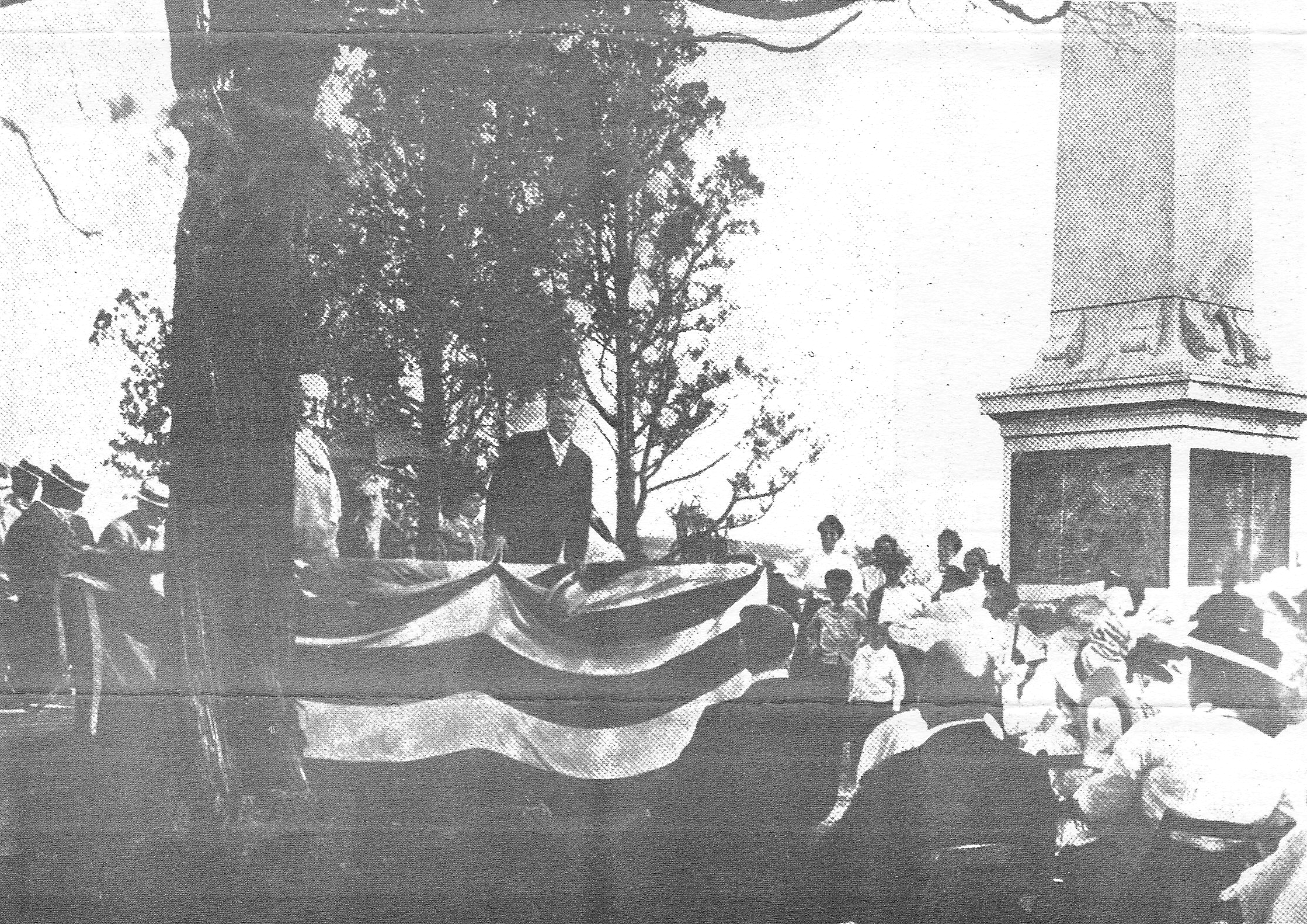
Theodore Roosevelt at the dedication of the Captain John Underhill monument, July 11, 1908.

The monument was subsequently built in 1907 at the Underhill Burying Ground and dedicated by President Theodore Roosevelt on July 11, 1908. Over 500 people attended the dedication ceremonies. At the ceremony, President Roosevelt said:

The founder of the family here was a good soldier and a good citizen, and the Underhills have to-day furnished their full quota of good soldiers and good citizens in their time. If they had not, I would not have been here.

Roosevelt noted that family members served in important roles in American life, including as capitalists and wage workers, farmers, mechanics, professional men, and others. Roosevelt said that "each one is entitled to the fullest and heartiest respect if he does his duty well in the position in life in which he happens to find himself."

He also said:

I have known any number of Underhills in every walk of life, men who made their living in many different ways - men belonging to the professions, men who followed the sea, men who tilled the soil, men of means, men who made each day's living by that days work with their hands - and all of them decent citizens. I won't say that there are not some Underhills who are not decent, but fortunately I have not met them.

=== Descendants of Captain John Underhill ===
Descendants of Captain John Underhill occupied various important stations in American life. Notable descendants included John Torboss Underhill, who distinguished himself in service during the Civil War and was elected Colonel of the 27th New York Volunteer Infantry Regiment in 1873. Estelle Skidmore Doremus was a Charter member of the Daughters of the American Revolution and a leading figure in the American colony in Paris during the reign of Napoleon III. Myron Charles Taylor was a leading American industrialist and a key diplomatic figure at the hub of many of the most important geopolitical events before, during, and after World War II.

In its early years, the Underhill Society held numerous events, ranging from family reunions, to the annual meeting, and a February meeting usually at the Friends' Seminary or Friends' Meeting House in New York City. These meetings attracted significant figures in society at the time. One of these was Alexander van Alstyne and his wife Fanny Crosby. At the third annual reunion of the Underhill Society in 1902, Alexander van Alstyne played piano and Fanny Crosby read an ode to Captain John Underhill. They later lived with David Harris Underhill, who organized the Underhill Society of America. His connection with Van Alstyne shows that he was part of a network.

The society continued to hold regular meetings and family reunions. After 1907 an Underhill Society Library, with offices and meeting space, was maintained at 198 Rutledge Street in Brooklyn, New York. An Annual Report was published annually from 1893 to 1937. Subsequently a Bulletin was published annually since 1954. A semi-annual newsletter called "News and Views" also has been published semi-annually since 1970.

The Underhill Burying Ground was the destination of the Colonial Daughters of the Seventeenth Century on November 4, 1929. About forty members, their guests, and members of other patriotic sites were present. David Harris Underhill welcomed the group and talked about Captain John Underhill's life. Among those present were President General, Mrs. J. Morton Halstead; First vice-President General, Mrs. Wilson W. Thompson; Second Vice-President General, Mrs. I. Sherwood Coffin; Registrar General, Mrs. James M. Edsall; and Genealogist Mrs. Samuel K. Frost.

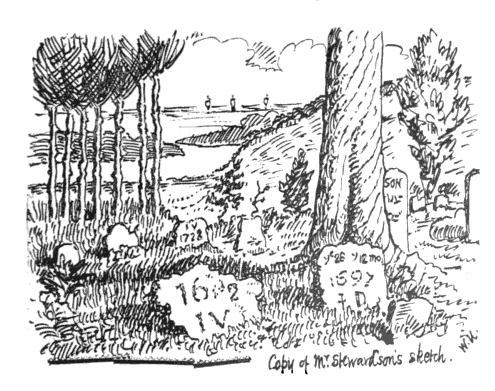
Copy of drawing by Stewardson from 1868.

David Harris Underhill amassed a sizable collection of material on Underhill history and genealogy, maintaining it in his home until his death in 1936. The collection was stored elsewhere for 45 years. In 1981 the Underhill Society of America and the Townsend Society of America leased space for this material on East Main Street in Oyster Bay. They continued to operate from this location through the 1990s, when the Underhill Society and Townsend Society sought separate offices for their collections. The Underhill Society of America presently has offices at 30 West Main Street in Oyster Bay, New York.

== Publishing ==
The Underhill Society of America has published or supported several works of history. Newes from America, an account of the Pequot War in 1641, was re-printed by the Society in 1902, 1951, and 1972. David Harris Underhill and Francis Jay Underhill published an extensive work titled Underhill Burying Ground that recounted the history of the family and notable people buried in the family cemetery in Lattingtown. Two general interest books on the Underhill family, Underhills of Warwickshire by John H. Morrison, and John Underhill Captain of New England and New Netherland, by Henry C. Shelley, were published in 1932.

The Underhill Society of America has worked to publish and refine an Underhill Genealogy. This is a comprehensive and authoritative resource identifying thousands of Underhill descendants. Volumes I-IV, edited by Josephine C. Frost, were originally published in 1932. These were followed by Vols. V-VI by Edwin R. Deats and Harry Macy, Jr., which were published in 1980. Finally, Vols. VII-VIII by Carl J. Underhill were published in 2002.

=== Publications ===
The Underhill Society of America has published the following:

- Annual Report, published annually from 1893 through 1937
- Bulletin, published annually since 1954
- "News and Views", semi-annual newsletter since 1970

The following books have been published by or for the society, either as original documents or reprints:

- Newes from America by Capt. John Underhill (reprint) 1902, 1951, 1972
- Underhill Burying Ground by David Harris Underhill and Francis Jay Underhill, 1926
- Underhills of Warwickshire by John H. Morrison, 1932
- John Underhill Captain of New England and New Netherland by Henry C. Shelley, 1932
- Underhill Genealogy, Vols. I-IV edited by Josephine C. Frost, 1932,
- Underhill Genealogy, Vols. V-VI by Edwin R. Deats and Harry Macy, Jr., 1980
- Underhill Genealogy, Vols. VII-VIII compiled by Carl J. Underhill, 2002

== Past presidents ==
Past presidents of the Underhill Society of America include:

- William Wilson Underhill (1892–1898)
- Estelle Skidmore Doremus (1898–1905)
- Col. John Torboss Underhill (1905–1924)
- Francis Jay Underhill (1924–1932)
- Willard Underhill Taylor (1932–1940)
- John Garrett Underhill, Sr. (1940–1946)
- Irving Underhill (1946–1950)
- Robert Feeks Underhill (1950–1954)
- John Garrett Underhill, Jr. (1954–1956)
- Charles Alonzo Underhill (1956–1968)
- George Townsend Underhill, Sr. (1968–1973)
- Le Grand Underhill (1974–1975)
- Thelma Weeks Powell (1975–1979)
- Hary Macy, Jr. (1979–1985)
- Andrew Mitchell Underhill, Jr. (1985–1987)
- Robert G. Pope (1987–1995)
- Richard W. Decker (1995–1996)
- N. Robert Underhill (1996–1998)
- George Townsend Underhill, Jr. (1998–2003)
- Carl J. Underhill (2003–2010)
- Robert L. Underhill (2010–2011)
- Jay B. Tucker (2011–present)

== Membership ==
Membership consists of descendants of Captain John Underhill. Members receive invitations to the annual meeting and to other events. Membership runs from January 1 through December 31 each year. Once members exceed the age of 80, they were named honorary members. This title was also reserved for those who have performed special services to the society. Names of honorary members were recorded in the annual report of the secretary for many years.

- Theodore Roosevelt, President of the United States who was on hand to dedicate the Underhill monument at the Underhill Burying Ground in 1908.
- Robert Ogden Doremus, for his services to the society
- Thomas P. Peters, former editor of the Brooklyn Daily Tribune.
- Gilbert Pell Underhill
- Aaron T. Underhill, died September 18, 1908.
- Mrs. Edward Trimble, daughter of Walter Underhill and granddaughter of Joshua Underhill.
- Anna C. Underhill, Locust Valley, New York
- Eliza J. Underhill, New York City
- Eliza S. Underhill, Ossining, New York
- George W.L. Underhill, New Rochelle, New York
- Hannah Emery, Washington, Vermont, died July 1905
- Adeline deForest Underhill, Poughkeepsie, New York
- Lucinda C. Underhill, mother of David Harris Underhill, died February 24, 1913.
