= Andrew Underhill =

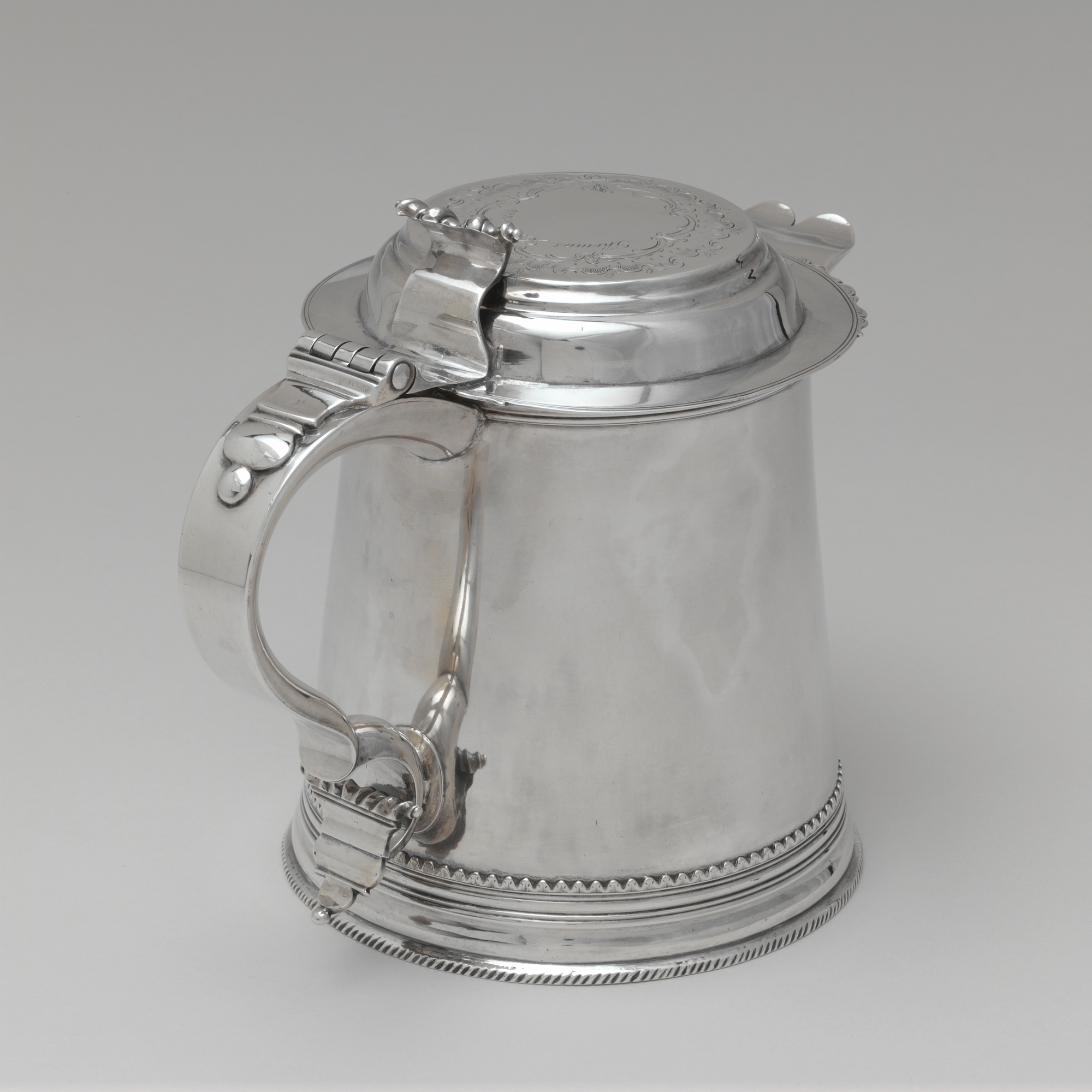
Tankard by Andrew Underhill, circa 1780–90

Andrew Underhill (April 17, 1749 - before June 14, 1794) was an American silversmith, active in New York City.

Underhill was born in Cedar Swamp, New York, or Westbury, Long Island, a brother of silversmith Thomas Underhill. He married Deborah Willett on November 3, 1774, in Matinecock, New York, and worked from 1775-1788 as a silversmith in New York City. On his death, his will records property in Vendewater Street and farms and mills at New Rochelle. His works are collected in the Art Institute of Chicago, Metropolitan Museum of Art, Museum of the City of New York, and Winterthur Museum.
