= William Wilson Underhill =

American businessman

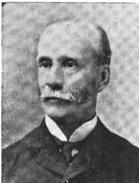
- Photo from the Annual report of the secretary, Volumes 12-25, Underhill Society of America, in 1904.
- Born: September 13, 1839; New York City, United States
- Died: June 11, 1935 (aged 95); Montclair, New Jersey, United States
- Education: University of Pennsylvania
- Occupation: Businessman
- Known for: President of the United States Insurance Company and first President of the Underhill Society of America.
- Spouse: Emily Haydock Griffin (1848–1923)
- Children: Louise Griffin Underhill (1869–1963) John Griffin Underhill (1870–1941) Wilson Underhill (1870–1914) Mabel King Underhill (1874–1929) Arthur Underhill (1874–1934) Clarence King Underhill (1877–1922) Ernest Underhill (1881–1938)
- Parent: Ira B. Underhill (1800-1957) Abigail King (1800-1880)

William Wilson Underhill (13 September 1839 – 11 June 1935) was an American businessman who was president of the United States Fire Insurance Company of New York. He was educated at Burlington College and the University of Pennsylvania. In addition to his professional roles, he was a descendant of Captain John Underhill and served as the first president of the Underhill Society of America, a lineage society that was formed to perpetuate John Underhill's memory.

== Biography ==
Underhill was born in New York City on September 13, 1839, the son of Ira B. Underhill (1800-1857), grandson of Joshua Underhill (1765-1839), and great-grandson of Isaac Underhill (1726-1814). Underhill was raised in Burlington, New Jersey and was graduated from the University of Pennsylvania. From 1859-1862 he served as a clerk in the insurance business. Underhill married Emily H. Griffin, the daughter of John L. Griffin who was a prominent member of the Society of Friends. He also served as a member of the Township Committee of Montclair, New Jersey in the 1890s. In business he was a clerk in the commission business from 1858 to 1862. He entered the service of United States Fire Insurance Company in 1862 as assistant secretary. In 1865 he became secretary and in 1882 he was elected President, replacing his uncle Abraham Sutton Underhill who served as President before him.

A war among insurance companies around 1898, caused a committee of 15 New York based insurance companies to be formed, and to organize a tariff association. E.C. Irvin of the Fire Association of Philadelphia said at the time, "Rates at first were made so high as to invite and foster unfair and illegitimate competition, loose practices, private deals, broken agreements, and at last utter demoralization. A meeting in September 1898 called for an association to rate and govern the fire insurance businesses in New York City. He was involved in discussions leading to formation of the tariff association, given his role as President of the United States Fire Insurance Company. Underhill was subsequently elected as Secretary for the Fire Insurance Tariff Committee. Citing the withdrawal of small companies and a large loss ration for the last two months in 1898, that the work of the committee would be favorably received.

Underhill was selected as the first President of the Underhill Society of America and also Chairman of the Monument Committee. The Underhill Society of America was founded in 1892 with the purpose of helping to establish this monument. Having made insufficient headway with raising the $6,000 in needed funds, He resigned as President of the Underhill Society and as Chairman of the Monument Committee. Estelle Skidmore Doremus took his place as the second President.

Underhill died in the home of his daughter Mrs. Henry C. Meyer, Jr., at 25 Highland Avenue in Montclair, New Jersey, on June 11, 1935. Underhill had been living there the past 15 years prior to his death at the age of 96. Surviving beside his daughter were two sons: Ernest Underhill of Verona, New Jersey and John Griffin Underhill of St. Petersburg, Florida.
