= Sarah Platt Doremus =

American philanthropist (1802–1877)

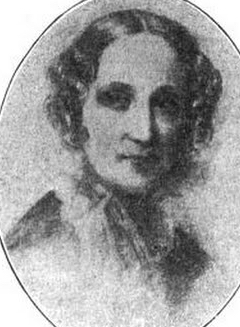
- Born: 3 August 1802; New York City
- Died: 29 January 1877; New York City
- Occupations: Philanthropist, missionary

Sarah Platt Doremus (née , Haines; also known as, Mrs. T. C. Doremus; 3 August 1802 – 29 January 1877) was a 19th-century American philanthropist.

== Biography ==
Sarah Platt Haines was born 3 August 1802, in New York City. She was the daughter of Elias Haines, a merchant of New York, and her mother was the daughter of Robert Ogden, a distinguished lawyer of New Jersey. In 1812, she united with her mother in praying for the conversion of the world, and from that time dates her interest in foreign missions. She married, in 1821, Thomas C. Doremus, a merchant, whose wealth thenceforth was freely expended in her benevolent enterprises.

In 1828, with eight women, she organized the Greek relief mission, and sent Jonas King to Greece to distribute supplies. Seven years later she became interested in the mission at Grand Ligne, Canada, conducted by Henriette Feller of Switzerland, and in 1860, was made president of the organization. In 1840, she began visiting the New York City prisons, and after establishing Sabbath services, used her influence in 1842 toward founding the Home for Women Discharged from Prison, which later became the Isaac T. Hopper Home, of which she became president on the death of her friend and co-founder, Catharine Sedgwick.

Doremus aided in founding, in 1850, the House and School of Industry for Poor Women, becoming its president in 1867, and in 1854, became vice-president of the Nursery and Child's Hospital. In 1855, she assisted J. Marion Sims in his project of establishing the New York Woman's Hospital, of which she was ultimately president. During the American Civil War, she cooperated with the work carried on in the hospitals, ministering alike to the wounded from north and south. She founded, in 1860, the Woman's Union Missionary Society, designed to elevate and Christianize the women of heathen lands, and she took an active part as manager in the Presbyterian home for aged women, organized in 1866. She aided in collecting supplies to relieve the sufferers from famine in Ireland in 1869, and was for many years manager of the female branch of the City Mission and Tract Society and of the Female Bible Society. The last society in which she labored was known as the "Gould Memorial," and had for its objects the establishment of Italian-American schools. All foreign missions, without regard to creed, shared her sympathies.

She had a family of nine children of her own, and others that she adopted. Her son Robert Ogden Doremus was a noted chemist.

Doremus died in New York City on 29 January 1877.

== Publications ==
- Historical sketch of the Woman's Union Missionary Society (1884)
