= John Garrett Underhill =

American author and stage producer

- Born: January 10, 1876; Brooklyn, New York, U.S.
- Died: May 15, 1946 (aged 69–70); 120 Joralemon Street, Brooklyn, New York, U.S.
- Education: Polytechnic Institute
- Occupations: Translator, professor, producer
- Known for: Authority on Jacinto Benavente and other Spanish authors

John Garrett Underhill (January 10, 1876 – May 15, 1946) was an American author and stage producer who translated the works of Jacinto Benavente, a Spanish dramatist and winner of the Nobel Prize for Literature, and a number of other Spanish authors.

== Biography ==
Underhill was born in Brooklyn in 1876, the son of Francis French Underhill and Mrs. Frances Bergen Underhill. He graduated from the Polytechnic Institute in 1894, received an A.M. at Columbia University two years later and a Ph.D. there in 1899.

For the next two years he served at Columbia University as an assistant in comparative literature. In 1901 he went to the stage, gaining first-hand experience of drama by appearing in several plays.

In 1911 Underhill became general representative for the United States and Canada of the Society of Spanish Authors. He began the work of translating Benavente's plays in 1917, completing four series of translations by 1924.

In 1922/23 E. P. Dutton published translations of plays attributed to Gregorio Martínez Sierra in a two-volume set (the plays are now thought to have been substantially the work of María Martínez Sierra). Underhill translated the four plays in Volume I (The Cradle Song and other plays). The plays in the second volume were translated by Helen and Harley Granville-Barker.

When a fire occurred at the Twilight Inn in Haines Falls, New York, resulting in death of at least 19 people, Underhill was on hand and served in the inquest that followed.

Four plays by Lope de Vega were translated by Underhill in 1936, including "The Sheep Well" (Fuenteovejuna) which had its first performance in English in the Experimental Theatre at Vassar College, May 1, 1936.

A member of The Players, he was author of the book "Spanish Literature in the England of the Tudors, published in 1899.

Around 1937, Underhill was living at 2 Grace Court in Brooklyn.

Between 1940 and 1946, Dr. John Garrett Underhill, Sr., served as 6th President of the Underhill Society of America. Years later his son John Garrett Underhill Jr. would take on the same role.

== Production history ==
Mr. Underhill started his career as a producer of Benavente in 1919 with Bonds of Interest for the Theatre Guild. The next year La Malquerida was produced at the Greenwich Village Theatre starring Nance O'Neil, under the title of Passion Flower. The production was well reviewed and critic Alexander Woollcott of The New York Times was favorably impressed by Mr. Underhill's part in the work. When the play was made into the film The Passion Flower (1921) without his permission, Underhill successfully sued for damages.

The Field of Ermine, belonging to the latest period of Benavente's works was produced with Miss O'Neil in 1922. Eva Le Gallienne starred in Saturday Night in 1926 which the translator described as "the first of Benavente's cerebral dramas." Mr. Underhill again produced Bonds of Interest, with Walter Hampden, in 1929. In 1926, he had produced the Martínez Sierra play The Cradle Song in London, bringing it to New York the next year.

He received the Spanish Order of Isabel the Catholic for his work.

== Family ==
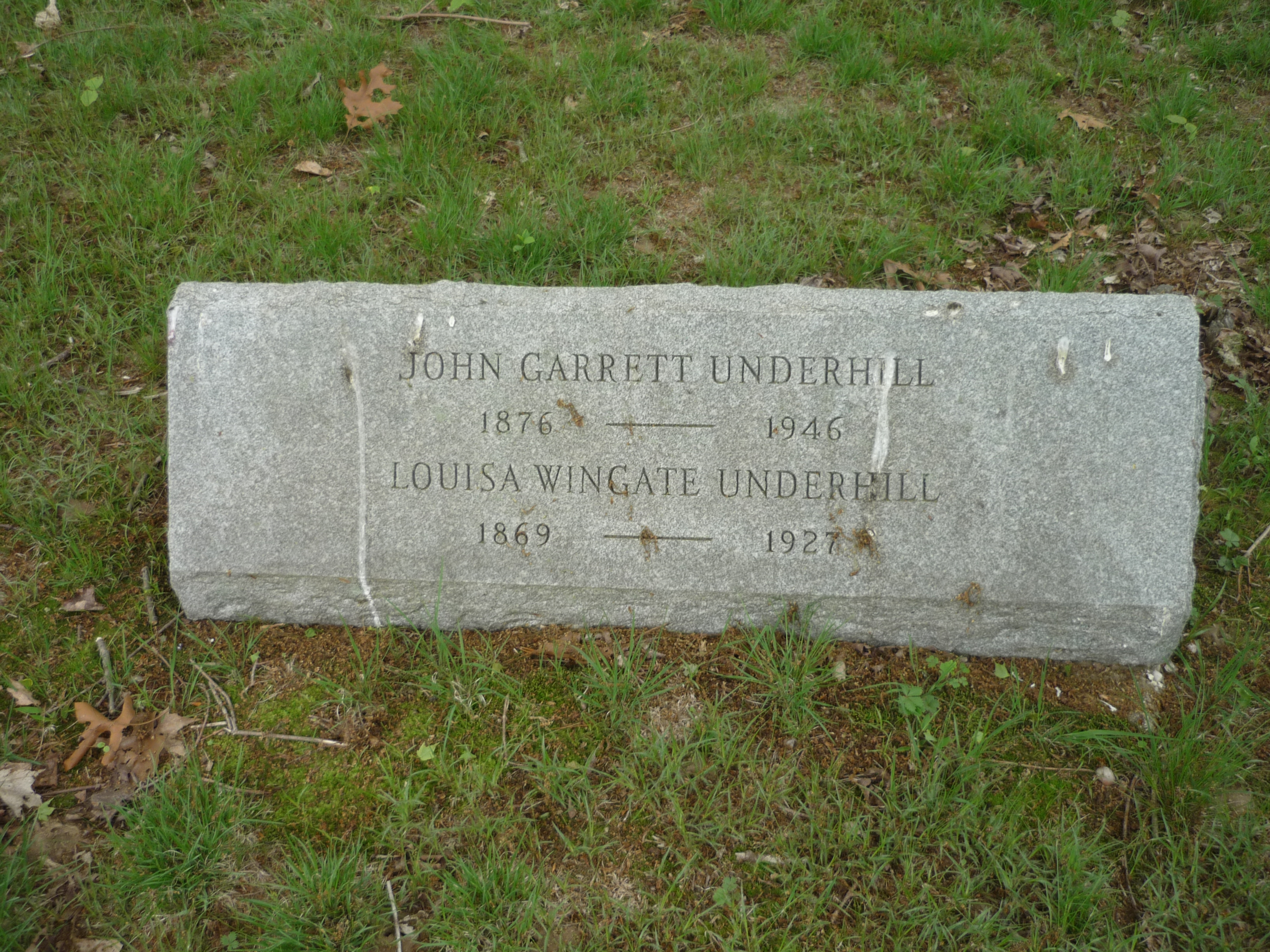
John Garrett Underhill and Louisa Man Wingate headstone at the Underhill Burying Ground in Lattingtown, New York

John Garrett Underhill married Louisa Man Wingate (1869–1927). She was the daughter of General George Wood Wingate and a sister of Surrogate George A. Wingate. Educated at Miss Round's School, she was President of the Rounds Alumnae Association. Mrs. Underhill was Active in civic and social work in Brooklyn. She organized the Linger-Not Society, which was popular in the Catskill Mountains in pre-war days. She was also founder of the Brooklyn Junior League, Treasurer for seventeen years of the Girls' Branch of the Public Schools Athletic League, and a former president of the Brooklyn Branch of the Army Relief Society, the Mothers' Club of Friends' School, and the Civitas Club. The Little Italy Neighborhood Settlement was another of her interests. She was president of it from 1908 to 1911. Mrs. Underhill was also a member of the National Arts Club, the Twelfth Night Club, the Garden Club of America, the Women's City Club, the National Civic Federation, the Brooklyn Chamber of Commerce and the Tuberculosis Committee of the Brooklyn Bureau of Charities.

They had two children, including Susan Prudence Underhill and John Garrett Underhill Jr. Louisa Man Wingate Underhill died on May 15, 1927, at 1100 Dean Street in Brooklyn after a long illness.
