= Robert Ogden Doremus =

American chemist (1824–1906)

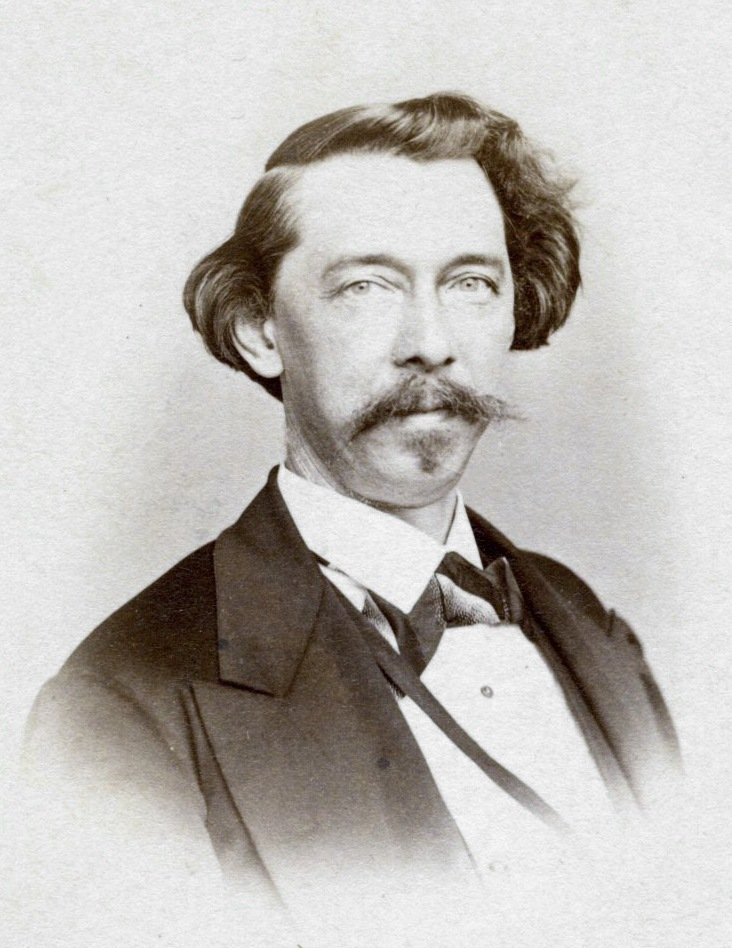
- Born: 11 January 1824; New York City, US
- Died: 22 March 1906 (aged 82); New York City, US
- Education: New York University (B.S., 1842; M.D., 1850)
- Spouse: Estelle Skidmore Doremus
- Scientific career
- Fields: Chemistry

Signature
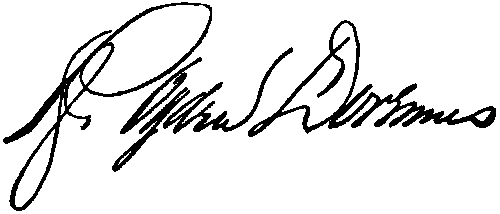

Robert Ogden Doremus (11 January 1824 – 22 March 1906) was an American chemist and physician.

== Biography ==
Doremus was the son of philanthropist Sarah Platt Doremus and her merchant husband Thomas. He studied at Columbia, and graduated from New York University in 1842. Here he came under the influence of John W. Draper, and in 1843 became his assistant in the medical department of the University. This office he held for seven years, and aided Draper in many of his famous researches on light and heat. In 1847 Doremus went to Europe, continuing his chemical studies in Paris with special reference to electrometallurgy, also visiting the establishments where chemical products were manufactured.

On his return to New York, in 1848, he established with Charles T. Harris a laboratory on Broadway for the purpose of giving instruction in analytical chemistry, and for making commercial analyses. He was elected professor of chemistry in the New York College of Pharmacy in 1849, and delivered the first lectures in his own laboratory. Meanwhile, he studied medicine with Abraham S. Cox, and received his degree from the medical department of the University in 1850.

He was one of the founders of the New York Medical College in 1850, and at his own expense arranged and equipped the first laboratory in the United States for instructing medical students in analytical chemistry, requiring all the candidates for graduation to pass this examination.

In 1851 he was elected professor of natural history in the Free Academy of the City of New York (later renamed the City College of New York) where he remained as a professor until 1902.

In 1859 he was associated with others in establishing the Long Island College Hospital, where he lectured for several years. He was appointed professor of chemistry and toxicology in Bellevue Hospital Medical College, New York, in 1861.

A year later he went to Paris, where he spent two years in developing the use of compressed granulated gunpowder in firearms. The cartridges patented by him require no serge envelopes as are ordinarily used in muzzle loading cannon, and hence no sponging of the gun after firing is necessary. Doremus was authorized by the French minister of war to modify the machinery in the Bouchet pouderie so that gunpowder of the American character could be produced. Subsequently, an exhibition of the firing of compressed granulated powder in cannon and small arms was made in Vincennes, before Napoleon III and many of his generals. This system was adopted by the French government, and a large portion of the Mont Cenis Tunnel was blasted with "la poudre comprimée."

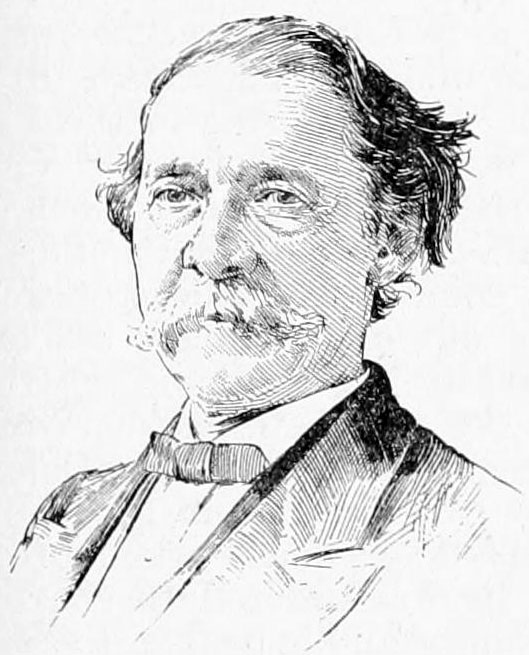
Robert Ogden Doremus

While in Paris, he was invited to fill the chair of chemistry and physics in the College of the City of New York. His lectures on toxicology at Bellevue Hospital Medical College resulted in his being called upon by coroners and district attorneys to examine poison cases, and he introduced radical changes in the system of medical jurisprudence. He established a special toxicological laboratory, with a dissecting room attached, kept under lock and key, using only reagents of known purity, and purchasing new glass and porcelain vessels for each case. Doremus further insisted that the expert should have ample time for his researches, and that he should be properly remunerated for his services.

His course led to more thorough scientific investigation than was formerly common in poison examinations. In the case of James Stephens, convicted of poisoning his wife, Doremus analyzed not only the entire body of Mrs. Stephens, but another human body, to test the question of "normal arsenic." He was the expert in the celebrated Burdell murder case (1857), and examined the blood-stains found in Dr. Burdell's room. In another case he proved the presence of strychnine in a body that had been buried for four months.

In 1865 the "Atlanta" arrived at quarantine, and during her voyage from Liverpool sixty of her passengers had died from cholera. A quick method of disinfection was necessary, and Doremus recommended that chlorine in enormous quantities be used. Under his direction, specially prepared vessels for the generation of this powerful gas were introduced between decks, the hatches battened down, and the vapor allowed to accomplish its work of destroying germs. This treatment proved thoroughly successful, and in 1875 the process was again used, with equal success, in the disinfection of hospital wards.

In 1871 he was appointed president of a board for examining the druggists and their clerks in New York city, which in six months examined over 900 persons. He obtained aid from the Board of Health in suppressing the gases emanating from the gas houses, and opposed its action in adopting the "lactometer with the senses" as the sole means of testing the purity of milk.

Doremus was known as a brilliant lecturer on scientific topics, and frequently appeared before New York audiences in that capacity. He has patented methods for extinguishing fires, and also other chemical processes, also introducing into the United States several chemical industries. The New York university has conferred on him the degree of LL.D.

Doremus held for several years the presidency of the New York Philharmonic Society, and has also been president of the New York Medico-Legal Society, of which organization he was chemist for several years. His published writings include only a few addresses, notably that at the unveiling of the Humboldt statue in Central Park, and papers delivered before scientific societies.

== Family ==
Robert Ogden Doremus married Estelle Skidmore Doremus on October 1, 1850. When Robert's work took the family to Paris, his wife Estelle was remembered as "the leader of the American colony in Paris during the most brilliant part of the reign of Napoleon III" in the early 1860s. Estelle and Robert Doremus had four children.

- Dr. Charles Avery Doremus, was engaged in the general practice of chemistry. For twenty-two years he served as a faculty member of the College of the City of New York. He died December 2, 1925, of heart disease.
- Thomas Cornelius Doremus died of pneumonia on March 25, 1928, at 74 years of age.
- Estelle E. Doremus died in August 1937. She was an accomplished musician and member of the Daughters of the American Revolution.
- Arthur Lispenard Doremus died on April 24, 1953, at 84 years of age.
