= David Harris Underhill =

American historian

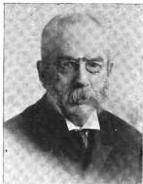
- Portrait of David Harris Underhill.
- Born: 5 June 1850
- Died: 29 June 1936 (aged 86); Bristol, Connecticut, US
- Resting place: Underhill Burying Ground, Lattingtown, New York
- Occupations: Librarian, editor
- Employer: New York Public Library
- Parent(s): Aaron Townsend Underhill (1823–1908) and Lucinda Cobb Harris (1830–1913)

David Harris Underhill was an American librarian and author. He was a librarian for the St. John's Methodist Episcopal Church in Williamsburgh and the Astor Library. He was librarian in charge of the newspaper room at the New York Public Library. Underhill helped to organize the Underhill Society of America in 1892, and served as Secretary and Family Historian until his death in 1936. He was also an active author, editor, and compiler with several published works to his credit.

== Biography ==
Underhill was born June 5, 1850, in New York City, the son of Aaron Townsend Underhill (1823–1908) and Lucinda Cobb Harris (1830–1913).

His professional career was spent as librarian, supervising collections in St. John's Methodist Episcopal Church in Williamsburgh, the Astor Library, and the New York Public Library's Newspaper Room. He retired from the New York Public Library in 1928 after more than 25 years of service. He was editor of the Standard Dictionary.

Underhill was a lineal descendant of Captain John Underhill who arrived in the Massachusetts Bay Colony in 1630 and was a leading figure in Colonial America. His interest in the family history is what likely led him to organize the Underhill Society of America in 1892. In early meetings of the Society, David Harris Underhill often presided and shared his research with other family members. At one such meeting on February 22, 1892, Underhill read "an outline history of the Underhill family, tracing the line back to the year 804.". At the 14th Annual Meeting of the Society in 1906, David Underhill read a paper on Edward Underhill, an ancestor from England whose religious activities had him confined in the Tower of London.

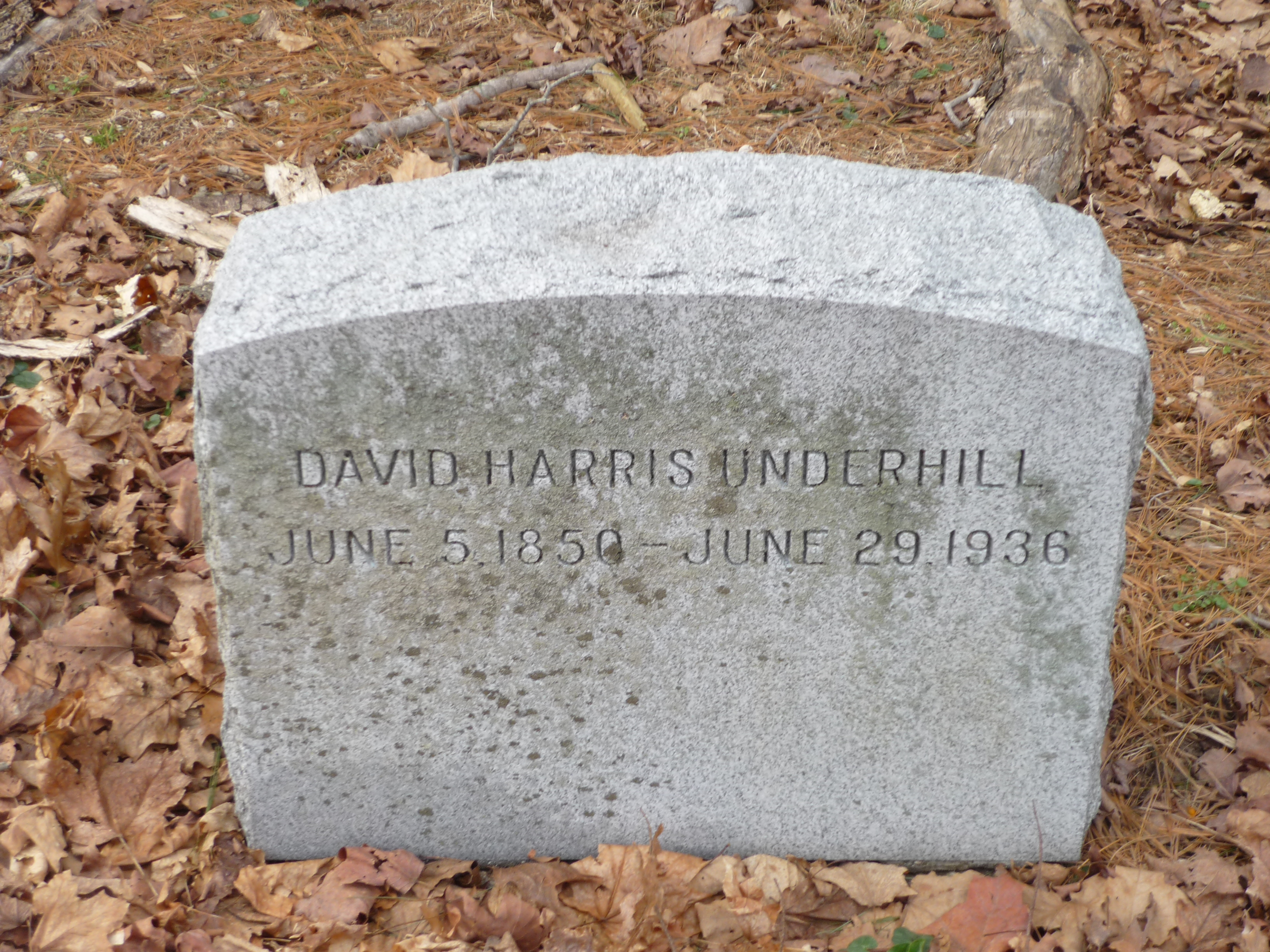
David Harris Underhill headstone at the Underhill Burying Ground.

He married Caroline Fidelia Green of South Starksboro, Vermont, on July 29, 1873, in Chappaqua, New York. They had two children: Stephen Greene and Lucinda Harris. He lived at 247 Winthrop Street in Brooklyn. After his wife's death in 1934, he moved to live with his daughter permanently in Vermont. Following his death on June 29, 1936, he was buried at the Underhill Burying Ground in Lattingtown, New York.

A sizable collection of material on Underhill history and genealogy was accumulated and maintained in his home until his death in 1936. The collection subsequently spent 45 years in storage. In 1981 space was leased by the Underhill Society of America along with the Townsend Society of America on East Main Street in Oyster Bay. They continued to operate from this location through the 1990s, when the Underhill Society and Townsend Society sought separate offices for their collections. The Underhill Society of America presently has offices and their archives in the basement of the Matinecock Masonic Lodge on West Main Street in Oyster Bay, New York, where many materials from the original David Harris Underhill collection are available to review.

The David Harris Underhill Papers measuring two linear feet are in the collection of the Underhill Society of America. They contain important material pertaining to his role organizing the Underhill Society of America, and his activities on behalf of the organization for several decades to follow.

== Publications ==
David Harris Underhill has the following publications to his credit. These include:

- The Underhill Burying Ground : an account of a parcel of land situate at Locust Valley, Long Island, New York, deeded by the Matinecock Indians, February twentieth, sixteen hundred and sixty seven, to Captain John Underhill for meritorious service and known as the Underhill Burying Ground. New York: Printed by the Hine Pub. Co., 1926.
- Newes from America, originally published in 1638, and re-published by efforts of David Harris Underhill and the Underhill Society of America.
- Standard Dictionary, editor.
