= John Underhill (captain) =

English colonist (1608/1609–1672)

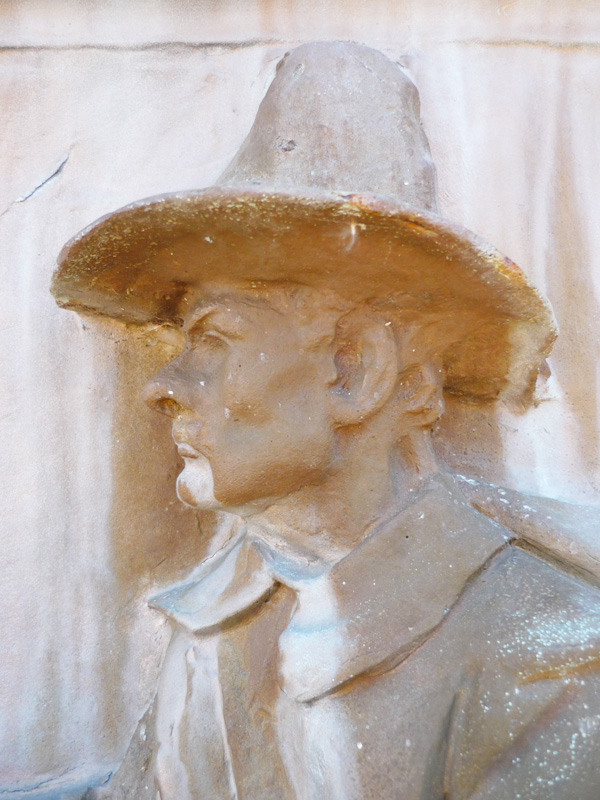
- Raised relief sculptural bust of Captain John Underhill from the Underhill Burying Ground near Oyster Bay, New York.
- Born: ca 1608/1609; Netherlands
- Died: 21 September 1672 (aged 74); Matinecock, Province of New York, British America
- Occupation: Military Officer
- Known for: Early settler of American colonies, Captain of the Massachusetts Bay Colony Militia
- Spouse: Helena de Hooch (died) Elizabeth Feake
- Parent(s): John Underhill (1574–1608), Leonora Honor Pawley
- Military career
- Allegiance: Massachusetts Bay Colony; New Netherlands; Colony of Rhode Island
- Branch: Massachusetts Bay Militia; New Netherlands Militia; Rhode Island Militia
- Service years: 1630-1637 (Massachusetts Bay Militia); 1644–1653 (New Netherlands Militia); 1654 (Rhode Island Militia)
- Conflicts: Pequot War; Kieft's War

John Underhill (c. 1608/09 – 21 July 1672) was an early English settler and soldier in the Massachusetts Bay Colony, the Province of New Hampshire, where he also served as governor; the New Haven Colony, New Netherland, and later the Province of New York, settling on Long Island. Hired to train militia in New England, he is most noted for leading colonial militia in the Pequot War (1636–1637) and Kieft's War which the colonists mounted against two different groups of Native Americans. He also published an account of the Pequot War.

== Biography ==
=== Early life, military, and marriage ===
John Underhill was one of three children of John Underhill (1574–1608) and Leonora Honor Pawley. His great-grandfather Sir Hugh Underhill was Keeper of the Wardrobe for Queen Elizabeth at Greenwich, and his grandfather Thomas Underhill held the same position at Kenilworth Castle for Elizabeth's favorite, Robert Dudley, 1st Earl of Leicester.

John Underhill was born in ca 1608/09 in the Netherlands. His family had escaped to the Netherlands after a failed plot by the Earl of Essex to overthrow the Queen. There they stayed in Bergen op Zoom, a heavily fortified city. John Underhill was sergeant in the company of Captain Roger Orme. He died there in October 1608 and is buried in the Church of St. Gertrude.

Following his father's death, John Underhill and his siblings lived with their mother and a group of Puritan exiles in the Netherlands. While there he received military training as a cadet in the service of Philip William, the Prince of Orange. He also married a Dutch girl, Helena (Heylken) de Hooch on 12 December 1628 in the Kloosterkerk, The Hague, Holland. They had one child born in the Netherlands before emigrating, Deborah Underhill, and two other children after emigrating: Elizabeth (born 1635) and John Underhill (1642–1692).

=== Massachusetts Bay Colony ===
In 1630, Underhill was hired by the Massachusetts Bay Colony with the rank of captain and asked to help train the colony's militia. He and his Dutch wife emigrated to the Massachusetts Bay Colony on the Arbella that year. In May 1634 he was appointed to the General Court, and in July was elected a selectman for Boston. He started the first construction of the fortification on Castle Island at Boston.

Early in 1636 he was sent to Salem to arrest Roger Williams, considered a heretic by the Puritans. But, Williams had already fled to Rhode Island. In August 1636 Underhill led an expedition to Block Island.

=== Pequot War ===
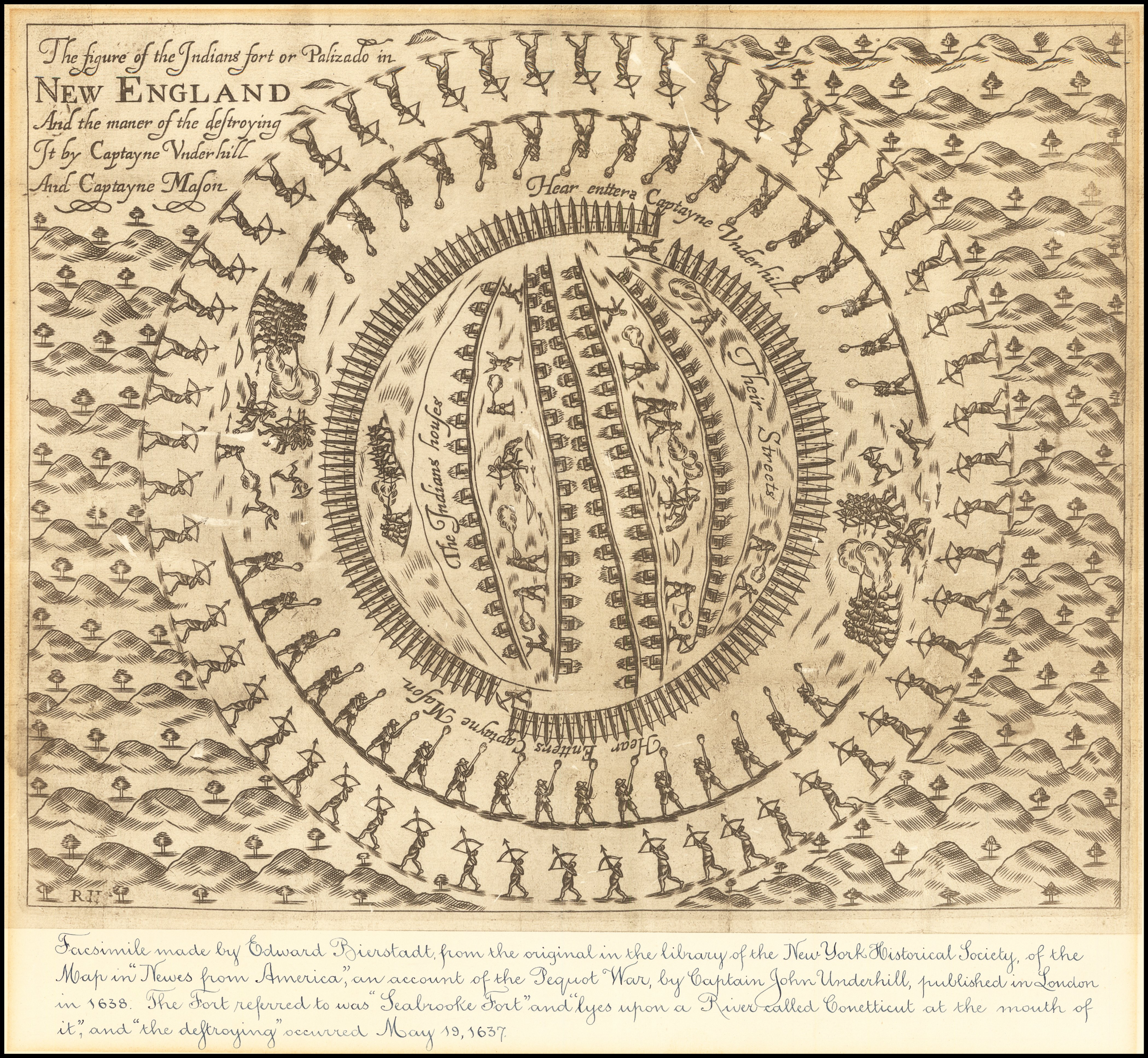
Engraving published with Underhill's account of the Pequot War, 1638

Using the Narragansett killing of a Plymouth Colony-exile and the mistaken killing of an English pirate by the Pequot people as a pretext, the English colonists decided to go to war against the Pequots who controlled the regional wampum trade and coastal lands desired by the Puritans. In September 1637 Underhill headed the militia as it undertook the Pequot War. They first went to the fort at Saybrook, in present-day Connecticut. Joining with Mohegan allies and Connecticut militia under Captain John Mason, they attacked the fortified Pequot village near modern Mystic. They set fire to the village, killing any who attempted to flee. About 400 Pequot died in what came to be called the Mystic massacre.

Underhill led other expeditions that joined in hunting down the surviving Pequot. He published an account of his service as Newes from America; Or, A New and Experimentall Discoverie of New England; Containing, A True Relation of Their War-like Proceedings These Two Yeares Last Past, with a Figure of the Indian Fort, or Palizado (London, 1638).

=== Wandering years ===
Within a year of these exploits, Underhill suffered from the Puritan drive for conformity. He had signed the Boston petition supporting minister John Wheelwright, who had been censured for a sermon. Underhill was removed from office and disfranchised in 1637, banished along with Anne Hutchinson in 1638, and excommunicated in 1640. After a fruitless trip to England in search of employment, Underhill returned to Boston. He sold his house and land and joined Wheelwright, who had settled in Dover, New Hampshire. Underhill's mother and her second husband Morris also left Boston, moving to nearby Exeter. In Dover, Underhill soon rose to the position of Governor, although Governor John Winthrop had written letters to citizens of that community denouncing him.

In June 1641 Underhill's banishment was repealed. In September of that year he was acquitted of a charge of adultery. Still finding no gainful employment in Boston, following the baptism of his son John III in April 1642, he leased a tobacco plantation in Flatlands, Long Island, in New Netherland. He never occupied that land.

Underhill moved to Stamford, Connecticut, where he was named a Freeman in 1642, a Deputy to the General Court of the New Haven Colony in 1643, and Justice of the Stamford Court. Following Indian raids in 1643, he was hired by the New Netherland Board of Eight Selectmen to attack Lenape settlements.

In February 1644, working for the Dutch, Underhill slaughtered an estimated 500 to 700 Lenape, thought to be of the Siwanoy and Wechquaesgeek bands of the Wappinger Confederacy. The killings occurred at a winter village of the natives, the site of which has not been identified with certainty. Some researchers believe it may have been located at what are now the sites of Pound Ridge or Bedford, New York.

=== Service in New Netherland ===
In May 1644, Underhill took up residence in New Amsterdam. His plot of land at the southern end of the island was later developed as the site of Trinity Church in Manhattan. Later that year he led New Amsterdam's forces in a reprise of his attack during the Pequot War. The Indians on Long Island built a fort called Fort Neck in what is now Massapequa. Underhill attacked and burned the Massapequan fort, killing about 120 Indians. The war started because the leader of the Indians, Tackapausha, claimed he sold the Dutch use to the land, but not the land itself. This was related to differing cultural ideas about land and its use and ownership.

Upon returning to Manhattan, in 1645, Underhill was elected a Selectman to the Council of New Amsterdam. That same year he was named one of Eight Men to adopt measures against the Indians. While preparing to occupy Bergen Island, he was assigned to Flushing by Governor Peter Stuyvesant. He was appointed sheriff of Flushing in 1648 and magistrate from 1651 to 1653.

In 1653, Underill turned against Stuyvesant, accusing him of being a tyrant. As Flushing's leader, Underhill issued a proclamation calling for the overthrow of the government: "We declare that it is right and proper to defend ourselves and our rights, which belong to a free people, against the abuses of the above named government." Just as many of his descendants would enumerate George III's wrongdoings, so he described Stuyvesant's; he had, for example, imposed magistrates on the people of Flushing "without election or voting." In conclusion, Underhill declared, "This great autocracy and tyranny is too grievous for any brave Englishman and good Christian any longer to tolerate Accept and submit ye, then, to the Parliament of England." This was a precursor to the Flushing Remonstrance of 1657, that questioned and challenged Dutch authority.

=== Return to English service ===
After being imprisoned by the Dutch for a brief time, Underhill was released. Upon hearing of Dutch plans to ally with some tribes to attack the English settlements, Underhill brought word of this to the colonies in Connecticut. The General Assembly of Rhode Island named him Commander-in-Chief and authorized him to seize a Dutch settlement named the House of Hope at Hartford, Connecticut. Fearing an attack by troops led by Underhill, Stuyvesant ordered that a high stockade and a small breastwork be constructed across the northern border of New Amsterdam. Thus Wall Street was built. When the First Anglo-Dutch War was finally resolved in 1654, Underhill returned to Long Island.

He lived in Southold, Setauket, and finally settled in the Town of Oyster Bay, where he lived out the remainder of his years. This place was on the eastern edge of New Netherland and far enough out of reach of Massachusetts Bay and other colonies to give Underhill a respite from war, conflict, and religious intolerance.

=== Retirement to Oyster Bay ===
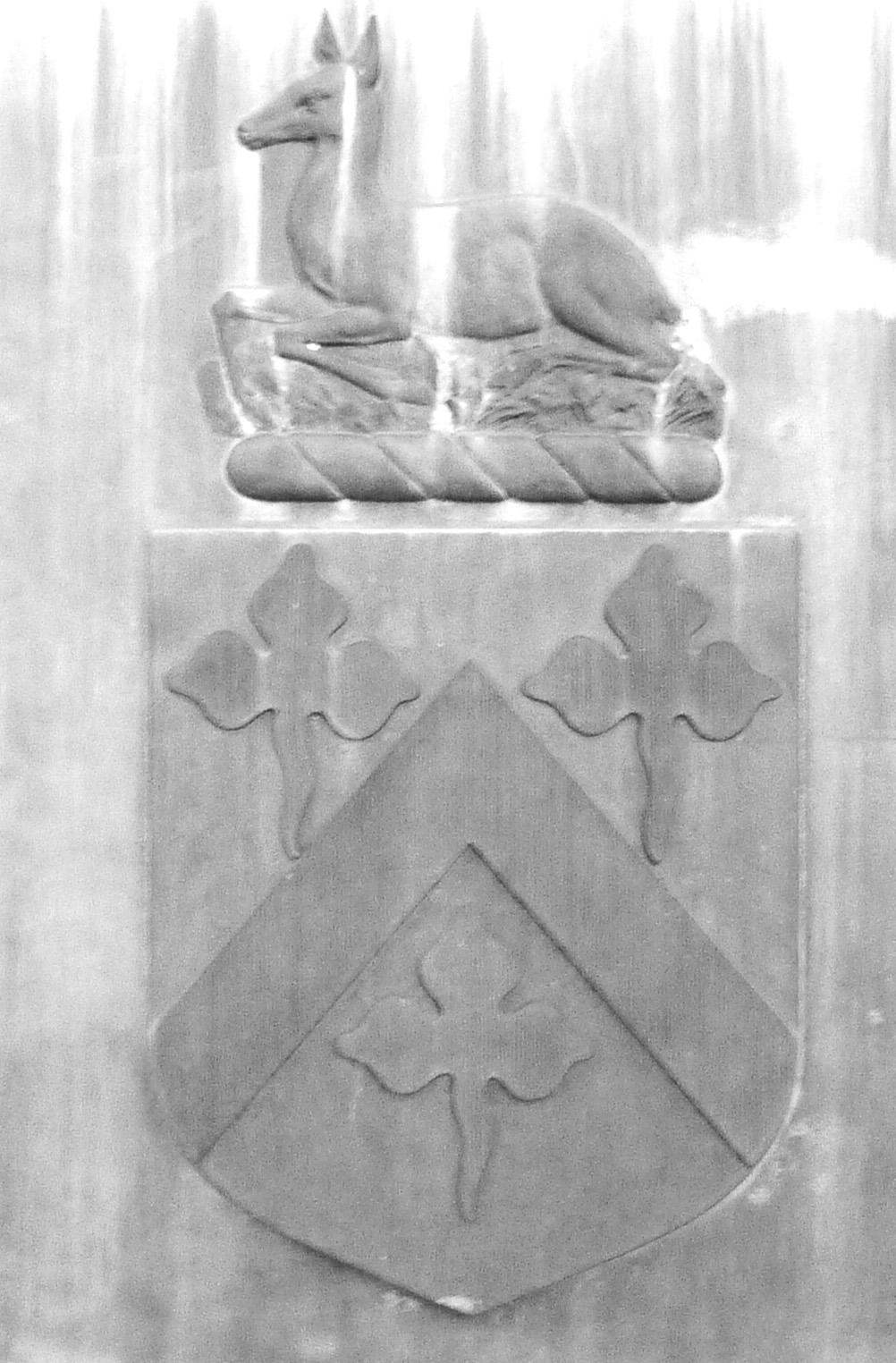
Coat of arms from Captain John Underhill monument in the Underhill Burying Ground near Oyster Bay, New York

Underhill eventually retired to a large estate (Kenilworth or Killingworth) at Oyster Bay on Long Island. He served as the Delegate of Oyster Bay to the Hempstead Convention in 1665. Delegates from all the towns on Long Island were asked to send two representatives. There they sought to establish laws. Underhill agreed on passage of a law that settlers could make no land purchases from the Lenape in the future without the government's consent. At the close of the convention, Underhill was named High Constable and Surveyor-General. The following year as Chief Advisor to the Matinecock Indians (a Lenape band named by the English for their location), Underhill presented a petition to the Council of Assizes in 1666. The Matinecock conveyed 150 acres (61 ha) of land in Oyster Bay to Underhill.

Following the death of his first wife and his mother in 1658, Underhill married his second wife Elizabeth Feake on 2 December 1658, in Oyster Bay. Feake was a Quaker and converted John to Quakerism before he died.

Elizabeth Feake and her family, much like Underhill, had an important role in the shaping of colonial America. She was the daughter of Elizabeth Fones and her second husband Robert Feake. Her mother was known to have married her third husband William Hallet while her second husband Robert Feake was still alive. Robert Feake had abandoned Elizabeth, and was considered mentally ill, but the couple had not obtained a divorce.

Hannah Feake, the second daughter of Robert Feake and Elizabeth Fones and sister of Elizabeth Feake, became an important figure in the fight for religious freedom in colonial America. Governor Peter Stuyvesant banned the rights of Quakers to assemble and worship. On 27 December 1657, thirty townspeople of Flushing signed the Flushing Remonstrance protesting this ban. The ban was later tested when Hannah, a Quaker minister herself, held services in her own home. Her husband John Bowne was arrested and returned to England, only to be released and allowed to return. The events contributed to the principles codified a century later in the First Amendment in the Bill of Rights, granting religious and political freedom to all citizens.

Captain John Underhill and Elizabeth Feake had five children: Deborah (1659–1697), Nathaniel (1663–1710), Hannah (1666–1757), Elizabeth (1669–1704), and David (1672–1708). Son Nathaniel Underhill settled in Westchester County, New York, where he became a prominent citizen and the progenitor of a large number of descendants. Several streets in Nassau County (Locust Valley and Syosset), and Westchester County are named for Underhill and his descendants.

Captain John Underhill died on 21 July 1672 and is buried in the Underhill Burying Ground in Locust Valley, New York.

Some of John Underhill's many descendants formed the Underhill Society of America.

== Arms ==
Coat of Arms of John Underhill

Matthews' American Armoury and Blue Book, published in 1907, describes the arms of Captain John Underhill as follows:

Captain John Underhill, 1597–1672, of Boston, 1630, Governor of Piscataqua Plantation. He had previously served in the British Army in the Netherlands, in Ireland, and at Cadiz. Arms - Argent, on a chevron Sable, between three trefoils slipped Vert, as many bezants. Crest - On a mount vert a hind lodged Or.

== Writings ==
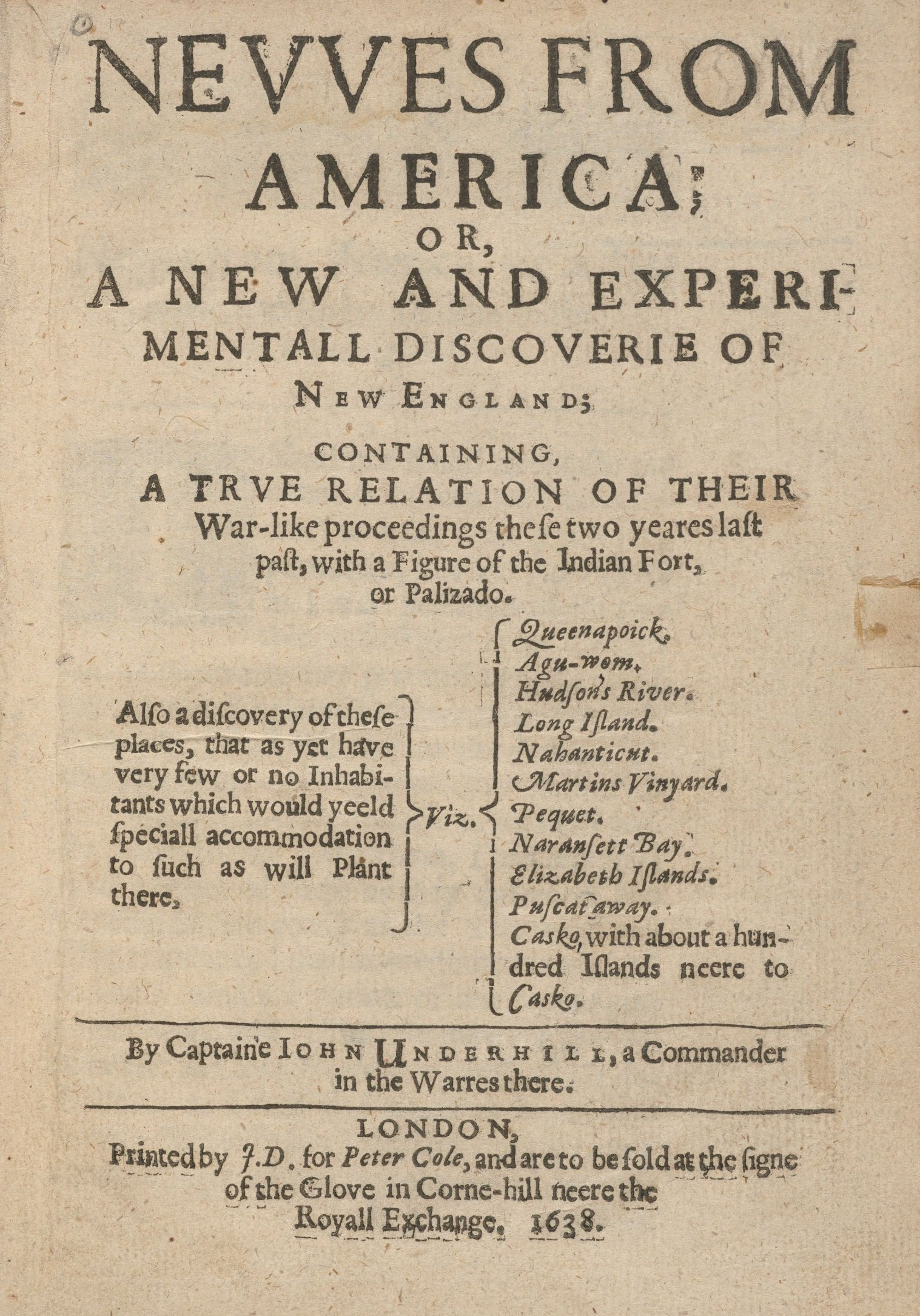
Newes from America; Or, A New and Experimentall Discoverie of New England, 1638

Underhill wrote numerous accounts; his most notable was Newes from America; Or, A New and Experimentall Discoverie of New England; Containing, A True Relation of Their War-like Proceedings These Two Yeares Last Past, with a Figure of the Indian Fort, or Palizado, considered the most complete contemporary account of the Pequot War of 1636–1637.

An excerpt of a letter from Captain Underhill to Hanserd Knollys appears in The Algerine Captive by Royall Tyler published in 1970 by Rowman & Littlefield.

== Tributes and memorials ==
- The Underhill Burying Ground is located on land granted by the Lenape to Captain John Underhill in 1667. The cemetery has been in continuous use since Underhill's burial in 1672.
- "John Underhill" is the title of a poem by John Greenleaf Whittier, published in Hazel Blossoms in 1875.
- An obelisk memorial honoring Underhill was dedicated at the Captain John Underhill gravesite in 1908 by President Theodore Roosevelt.
- A New York State marker notes the site of Council Rock - "Here George Fox, 1672, met with Wrights, Underhill and Feeke (sp.) at Quaker gathering."
- Underhill Blvd in Syosset was named after Captain John Underhill.

== Modern interpretations ==
John Underhill has been the subject of a recent trend toward historically revised accounts of the Pequot War. (See: Pequot War#Historical accounts and controversies). He has been described as a mercenary in service to the English and the Dutch. He was a professional soldier who was paid for his service. He served in the army of the Prince of Orange before coming to New England and was married to a Dutch woman. Ultimately he rejected these affiliations with the Netherlands and strongly asserted his patriotic commitment to England and English claims to North America.

== Notable descendants ==
- Myron Charles Taylor, a leading American industrialist and a key diplomatic figure before, during, and after World War II. He is an eighth-generation descendant of Captain John Underhill.
- Amelia Earhart, American aviation pioneer, pilot, and author, who disappeared on a flight planned across the Pacific.
- Tom Selleck, American actor
- John Kerry, US Secretary of State and American politician
- several members of the Kean American political family through Hamilton Fish Kean
- Winthrop Jordan, American professor of history
- Robert L. M. Underhill, American mountaineer
- Ruth Murray Underhill, Pioneering anthropologist
- Charles Lee Underhill, United States representative, Massachusetts
