= John Edward Underhill =

John Underhill (1574–1608) was the son of Thomas Underhill and grandson of Sir Hugh Underhill, two figures favored under the rule of Queen Elizabeth I. He would later have to emigrate to the Dutch Republic to escape persecution.

John Underhill was born in 1574 at Kenilworth, Warwickshire, England, the son of Thomas Underhill and Magdalen Amyas. He first married Mary Moseley (born 1561), who lived at Wolverhampton, Staffordshire, England, and in London, England. She was the daughter of Humphrey Moseley MP Treasurer of the Middle Temple 1551-6, and Lady Margaret Heigham. Mary was the granddaughter of Sir Clement Heigham and Lady Anne Munnings.

Of their three children, two daughters - Petronella and Lettice, are both recorded to have been born in 1593. Their son, the future Captain John Underhill, was born 7 October 1597 in Baginton, Warwickshire, England. Mary died after John Underhill's birth in 1597.

Following her death, he married his second wife Leonora Honor Pawley in Circa 1599 at the age of 25. Pawley had been born in 1575 at Uny Lelant, Cornwall, England.

Of their three children, two daughters - Petronella and Lettice, are both recorded to have been born in 1593. Their son, the future Captain John Underhill, was born 7 October 1597 in Baginton, Warwickshire, England. Mary died after John Underhill's birth in 1597.

John Underhill was a friend and companion to the Earls of Leicester and Essex, and while a youth held a commission in the Earl of Leicester's own Troop of Guards, that was sent to the assistance of the Dutch by Queen Elizabeth I. When the Netherlands offered their sovereignty to the Earl of Leicester, John Underhill was the bearer of confidential dispatches to Lord Burleigh, the Queen's Minister.

The Queen sent for Underhill and had a private interview. There, she instructed him to deliver a confidential letter to Leicester. Soon afterward, the Earl resigned and returned to England. Underhill, after the fall and death of Leicester, attached himself to the Earl of Essex. He accompanied Essex on a successful attack on Cadiz, Spain, and shared his ill fortune on a campaign against Tyronne and the revolted class in Ireland. For his gallant conduct, he was knighted by Elizabeth.

Meanwhile, the Earl of Essex rose in insurrection against the Queen. Essex was subsequently executed and Underhill left for the safety of Holland until the accession of King James in 1603, when he applied for pardon and leave to return to his native country. His request being denied, he remained in The Netherlands a number of years thereafter, in the company of a group of pious Puritans under the Rev. Mr. Robinson who had fled persecution in England. They lived in Bergen op Zoom, a heavily fortified city in The Netherlands. There John Underhill was Sergeant in the Company of Captain Roget Orme. He died there in October 1608 and is buried in the Gertrudiskerk.

Of his remaining family members, two are known to have emigrated to America. His wife Lenora Honor Pawley died on 18 December 1658 in Portsmouth, Newport, Rhode Island. And his son Captain John Underhill emigrated with the Puritans to the Massachusetts Bay Colony in 1630 and died in Oyster Bay, New York in 1672.

== Famous descendants ==
Captain John Underhill, great-grandson of Hugh Underhill, would emigrate from England to The Netherlands with his family, and then from The Netherlands to the Massachusetts Bay Colony where he became a leading figure in Colonial America.

Myron Charles Taylor, America's leading industrialist and a key diplomatic figure at the hub of many of the most important geopolitical events before, during, and after World War II. Also eighth generation descended from Captain John Underhill.

Amelia Earhart, American aviation pioneer and author, was famous for her mysterious disappearance.

== Notes ==
References- Humphrey Moseley Probated Will - England & Wales, Prerogative Court of Canterbury Wills 4 Aug 1592 daughter, Mary listed. London, England, Church of England Baptisms, Marriages and Burials Humphrey Moseley father Mary Moseley Baptism, Mary Mosley Gender Female Record Type Baptism Baptism Date 2 Jul 1561 Baptism Place St Nicholas, Cole Abbey, City of London, London, England Father Humphrey Mosley Mary Moseley Uphill Colonial Families of the USA, daughter of References Source citation for England, Oxford Men and Their Colleges
