= William Zouche =

Archbishop of York (1342–1352) and Treasurer of England (1337–1340)

- Archbishop of York
- Elected: 2 May 1340
- Installed: 1342
- Term ended: 19 July 1352
- Predecessor: William Melton
- Successor: John Thoresby
- Other post: Dean of York

Orders
- Ordination: c. 1317
- Consecration: 7 July 1342 by Pope Clement VI

Personal details
- Born: 1299 Lubbesthorpe, Leicestershire
- Died: 19 July 1352 (aged 52–53) Cawood Palace, Yorkshire
- Buried: York Minster
- Denomination: Roman Catholic

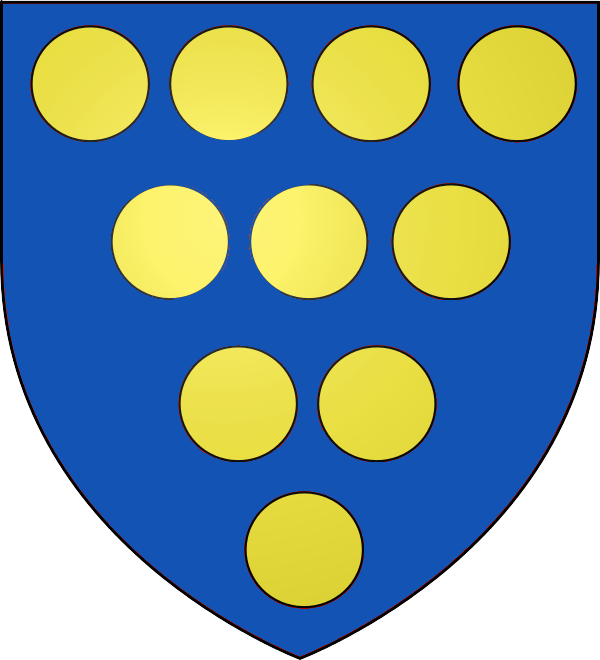
Arms of Zouche of Lubbesthorpe: Azure, ten bezants 4, 3, 2, 1, being a difference of the arms of the senior line of Zouche which has a field gules

William de la Zouche (1299–1352) was Lord Treasurer of England and served as Archbishop of York from 1342 until his death.

== Origins ==
He was the youngest son of Sir Roger de la Zouche (died 1302) of Lubbesthorpe in Leicestershire (younger brother of William la Zouche, 1st Baron Zouche (1276–1351) of Harringworth, Northamptonshire) by his wife Juliana de Brascy.

== Career ==
He was educated at Oxford University where he graduated as a Master of Arts and a Bachelor of Canon Law, before taking holy orders. He served as a royal chaplain before entering the Treasury and was appointed Keeper of the Wardrobe from 1329 to 1334, Controller of the Wardrobe from 1334 to 1335 and Lord Privy Seal from 1335 to 1337.

In 1337 he was promoted to Lord Treasurer, a post which he held until March 1338, and again from December 1338 to May 1340. In this role, he was responsible for receiving monies from tax collectors and holding it for the King.

After preferment to various benefices, in 1329 he was appointed Archdeacon of Barnstaple in Devon, was collated Archdeacon of Exeter on 12 July 1330 and was made Dean of York in 1336.

Following the death of William Melton, Archbishop of York, King Edward III wanted his secretary, William de Kildesby (of Kilsby) elected to the post. However, the Canons of York Minster elected Zouche, then Dean of York, on 2 May 1340. The king endeavoured to set aside the election, but without effect, and after a delay of two years, Zouche was consecrated at Avignon on 7 July 1342 by Pope Clement VI.

Zouche had been in the employ of Edward III before his elevation to the see, but had fallen out of favour. He was not forgiven until 1346, when he was appointed a Warden of the Marches. In this capacity he led one of the bodies of English troops which defeated the Scots at the Battle of Neville's Cross, near Durham, on 18 October 1346. The king was extremely thankful and Archbishop Zouche was asked to continue his careful watch over the Scottish Marches.

Whilst Zouche was serving as archbishop, the Black Death spread throughout England and his province, thus in 1349 he sought papal approval to consecrate extra burial grounds and to ordain replacement clergy.

== Death and burial ==
Zouche died on 19 July 1352 at Cawood Palace and was buried before the altar of St Edward in the nave of York Minster. He founded and began the building of a chantry chapel adjoining the south wall of the choir. This appears to have been demolished when Thoresby's wider choir was built and no trace of it remains.

== See also ==
- Baron Zouche

Political offices
Preceded by Robert Tawton	Lord Privy Seal; 1335–1337	Succeeded by Richard Bintworth
Preceded by Henry Burghersh	Lord High Treasurer; 1337–1338	Succeeded by Robert Wodehouse
Preceded by Robert Wodehouse	Lord High Treasurer; 1338–1340	Succeeded by Robert Sadington
Catholic Church titles
Preceded by William Melton	Archbishop of York; 1342–1352	Succeeded by John of Thoresby
