= Thomas Underhill =

English Keeper of the Wardrobe (1545–1591)

Thomas Underhill (1545–1591) served as Keeper of the Wardrobe of Kenilworth Castle and had charge of its contents after the castle was given by Queen Elizabeth I to her favourite Robert Dudley, 1st Earl of Leicester in 1563.

Thomas Underhill was born the son of Sir Hugh Underhill and one of Thomas Maynman's daughters in 1545 at Greenwich, then in the County of Kent. Maynman served as Keeper of the Wardrobe at East Greenwich, the location of the Palace of Placentia. Underhill would not only marry his daughter and have Thomas Underhill as a son, but he would go on to replace Maynman as Keeper of the Wardrobe in 1563.

Appointed by Robert Dudley Earl of Leicester, Thomas Underhill assumed responsibility as Keeper of the Wardrobe at Kenilworth Castle. Kenilworth was given by Queen Elizabeth to her favourite Robert Dudley, 1st Earl of Leicester. The fact that Thomas Underhill, son of a well-regarded member of her household was sent, shows the affection Queen Elizabeth I had both for Dudley and Underhill.

During his time at Kenilworth, Thomas Underhill would witness transformation of the castle by making the north entrance the main entrance to suit the tastes of Elizabeth, and adding the Leicester building, a large apartment, and a residential block overlooking the lake.

Elizabeth visited Dudley at Kenilworth Castle several times in 1566, 1568, and 1575. The last visit is especially remembered for Elizabeth brought an entourage of several hundred people who were entertained for 19 days at a reputed cost to Dudley of £1000 per day, an amount that almost bankrupted him.

Thomas Underhill and Magdalen Amyas married in 1570 and had one son, John Edward Underhill, who was born 1574 at Kenilworth.

== Famous Descendants ==
John Edward Underhill (1574–1608), grandson of Hugh Underhill and son of Thomas Underhill, despite being born in England would be among Puritan exiles who left for Bergen op Zoom, The Netherlands, where he died and was buried.

Captain John Underhill, great-grandson of Hugh Underhill, would emigrate from England to The Netherlands with his family, and then from The Netherlands to the Massachusetts Bay Colony where he became a leading figure in Colonial America.

Myron Charles Taylor, America's leading industrialist, and a key diplomatic figure at the hub of many of the most important geopolitical events before, during, and after World War II. Also eighth generation descended from Captain John Underhill.

Amelia Earhart, American aviation pioneer and author famous for her mysterious disappearance.

== Sources ==
- Bulletin of the Underhill Society of America Education and Publishing Fund, 1967
- Boyer, Carl, Ancestral Lines: 144 Families in England, Germany, New England, New York, New Jersey and Pennsylvania, 1975
