= Nicholas Huggate =

Nicholas Huggate (or Hugate, Huegate, Hungate) (died 1338) was a King's Clerk and medieval Provost of Beverley Minster.

== Origins ==
He came from the village of Huggate near Pocklington (Yorks, East Riding). Huggate was one of the thrave (tithe) sources for the prebend of St Peter and St Paul's altar in Beverley Minster. He probably owed his introduction to royal service to William Melton, later Archbishop of York, under whom he served in the king's wardrobe, and for whom he served as proctor during Melton's absence at the papal curia.

== Royal service ==
Clerk of the wardrobe of Edward of Caernavon (the future Edward II) by 1306. Cofferer of the king's wardrobe 1314–1315.

Receiver for Aquitaine and Gascony from March 1324, during the War of Saint-Sardos in 1324. There are many references to his work in the Gascon Rolls, such as...

Order to Nicholas de Huggate, the king’s clerk, receiver of the king's money and victuals in the duchy, that once the town of La Réole has returned to the king's possession and lordship, he should satisfy the men of the town for the victuals and goods which Edmund, earl of Kent, the king's brother, took when he was there for the king's service, in accordance with information provided by the earl or his men by indenture made between Huggate and them. Huggate is to receive letters of acquittance from them attesting that they have received satisfaction, and he will have due allowance in his account.

Controller of the king's wardrobe 1326–1328.

== Ecclesiastical offices ==
=== Provost of Beverley ===
Admitted by royal grant 13 Jan 1318, succeeding William Melton. For the first 12 years he was absent from Beverley on the king's business, and he carried out his duties remotely, from London when he was in England. From 1330 onwards however he took up residence. He died at Beverley on 24 June 1338

=== Other appointments ===
- Canon of Salisbury and prebend of Yatesbury 1315–1318 (by royal grant).
- Canon of Beverley and prebend of St James Altar (by royal grant)
- Canon of Hereford and prebend of Piona Parva 1318 – ? (by exchange with Roger Northburgh).
- Archdeacon of Gloucester 1317–1318 (by royal grant).
- Canon of York and prebend of Barnby 1327–1338.
- Canon of Lincoln and prebend of Asgarby 1328–1338.
- Canon of Howden and prebend of Howden 1337, of Saltmarshe 1337–1338.
- Warden of St Nicholas Hospital York 1308–1318.

== Burial ==
His tomb is almost certainly on the east side of the North transept of the minster. His effigy has 19 heraldic shields on his robes, some of the royal family, some of local aristocracy.

== Will ==
His will was proved on 13 July 1338. He requested to be buried in the minster (see above). Almost all the bequests were religious in character. He left money to Beverley Minster, York Minster, Lincoln Cathedral and the College of St Martin-le-Grand. All the friaries in Yorkshire received a mark (160d) and the church of his native Huggate 5 marks. The largest bequests were £100 to be spent on his funeral (including gifts to the poor) and £200 given to hire 60 chaplains to sing daily for a year offices for the dead for his soul. He also made arrangements for chantries in Beverley and York Minsters.
