= Joan of Leeds =

14th-century fugitive nun

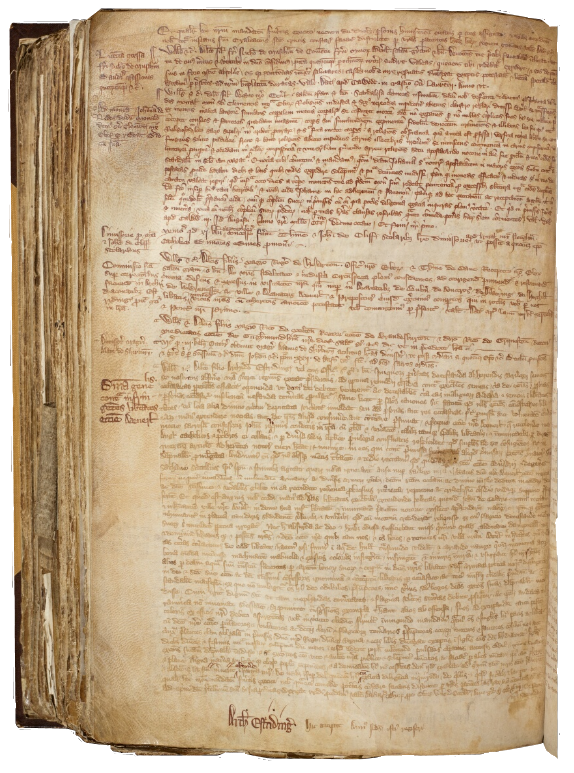
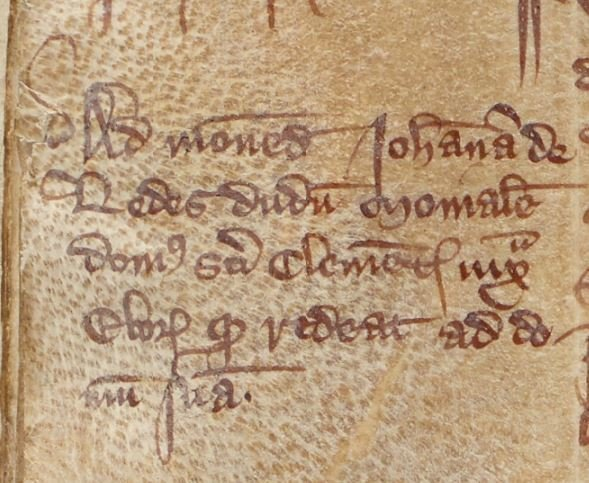

Joan of Leeds or Johannas de Ledes (fl. early 14th century) was an English nun, who, unhappy with her monastic and enclosed life, at some point in 1318 escaped from St Clement's by York priory to journey to Beverley, where she was accused of living with a man. To escape, she feigned mortal illness and constructed a dummy of herself, which her colleagues buried in holy ground. When the Archbishop of York, William Melton, heard of this, he wrote to the religious authorities in Beverley expounding upon Joan's faults and instructing that she be returned forthwith to St Clement's. It is not recorded whether she ever did return, and all that is known of her life and career come from three letters found in Melton's archepiscopal cartulary.

== Escape from the nunnery ==
Joan of Leeds was resident in St Clement's by York (also known as Clementhorpe), a Benedictine nunnery in the early years of the 14th century. All that is known of her life comes from three letters copied into a "registrum" of the Archbishop of York, which scholars believe to be copies of Melton's original letters. One of these letters made the news in 2019. Two more previously unknown letters about Joan were discovered in 2020.

In 1318, tired of her enclosed life, Joan faked a mortal illness and then her own death. She created a dummy "in the likeness of her body", to be buried instead of her corpse. A number of Joan's fellow nuns appear to have aided and abetted her plan, although it is less certain whether they did so willingly or were tricked into helping her. Believing—or pretending to believe—her to be dead, and perhaps being deceived by the dummy, they buried it as her "in a sacred space amongst the religious of that place", wrote Archbishop Melton. Joan's motives for escaping the nunnery are unknown, but the Archbishop put it down to a desire to follow "the way of carnal lust", which she was unable to do in orders having taken vows of poverty and chastity.

Tired of life within the walls of her convent, one nun did what anyone disillusioned with her job would do: she faked her death, make a life-like effigy to be buried in her place, and fled to live a life of carnal lust.

— Kaya Burgess, The Times

Joan was eventually discovered in Beverley, around 30 miles (48 km) from Clementhorpe, living "indecently" with a man. When this became known, it caused a scandal locally. Melton instructed her to return to her priory. In a letter to the Dean of Beverley, Melton wrote:

Out of a malicious mind simulating a bodily illness, she pretended to be dead, not dreading for the health of her soul, and with the help of numerous of her accomplices, evildoers, with malice aforethought, crafted a dummy in the likeness of her body ... [she had] no shame in procuring its burial in a sacred space ... She perverted her path of life arrogantly to the way of carnal lust and away from poverty and obedience. Having broken her vows and discarded the religious habit, she now wanders at large to the notorious peril to her soul and to the scandal of all of her order".

Whether she ever did return remains unknown, and it is possible that the Archbishop considered that he had fulfilled his duty in demanding she return without actually taking steps to ensure that his edict was enforced. However, a letter to Melton from a local priest, dated 26 August 1318, informed the Archbishop that she had approached the priest with her record of events, specifically confirming that she had faked her death in order to abscond. (Note: The letter is contained within Borthwick Institute, Register 9B, fo. 960v.)

=== Overview ===
Joan was not the first fugitive nun that St Clements by York had had to deal with. In 1301, another nun known only as Cecily had met a group of mounted men by the priory gate; throwing off her habit, she put on an ordinary gown and escaped to Darlington where she lived with one Gregory de Thornton for the next three years. In 1310 one of the nuns, Joan de Saxton, had been punished by Archbishop William Greenfield for unknown offences, but which, according to the historian Eileen Power, had probably involved immorality. Although the punishment was subsequently reduced, Greenfield wrote to the Prioress, Agnes de Methelay, laying out certain conditions for Joan de Saxton's future conduct. Among other restrictions, she could not leave the cloister except when accompanied by other nuns. She was forbidden from receiving visitors, and from having anything to do with one Lady de Walleys: if de Walleys visited Clementhorpe, de Saxton "was to be sent away before Pentecost". For her part, the prioress was forbidden to employ girls over the age of 12 in the priory except when absolutely unavoidable. Only the year before Joan of Leeds' escape Melton had instructed the priory that "the frequent access of men and women to the house was not to be allowed, lest evil or scandal should arise". (Note: Eileen Power has speculated that religious houses in the north of England generally were more prone to disorder on account of tending to be small, poor and close to the border with Scotland and the concomitant dangers associated with intermittent border warfare: "life was not easy for nuns who might at any moment have to flee before a raid and whose lands were constantly being ravaged; they grew more and more miserably poor and as usual poverty seemed to go hand in hand with laxity. Moreover, the conditions of life set their stamp upon the character of the ladies".) Problems continued at Clementhorpe, however; in 1318, Melton rebuked the priory for failing to enforce appropriate silence in the cloister, and, following further issues with troublesome nuns, de Methelay resigned as Prioress in 1324.

== Historical significance ==
Often it is to do with not wanting to be celibate and leaving the religious house—this applies to men as well as women—in order to have a relationship and get married ... many of the people would have been committed to a religious house when they were in their teens, and then they didn't all take to the religious life.

— Alison Flood, The Guardian

The story of Joan of Leeds came to light in 2019 when a research project at the University of York 's Borthwick Institute for Archives—headed by Professor Sarah Rees Jones—examining the "Registra" of the Archbishops of York for 1305–1405 uncovered the scribe's notes on the Archbishop's monition. (Note: " The Guardian" reported in 2019: "Although parts of some of the archbishops' registers have been published in the past, they were generally untranslated from Latin. Funding of almost £1m from the Arts and Humanities Research Council means the Borthwick Institute for Archives at the University of York, in partnership with the National Archives, is now working to translate the 16 books and make their contents available online.") The scribal notation is likely to be a copy of the Archbishop's letter to the Dean of Beverley. The books would accompany each Archbishop on his peripatetic travels through the Archiepiscopate, and contained everything from accounts of pensions and grants to the ordinations he carried out.

Rees Jones described Joan's tale as "extraordinary—like a Monty Python sketch", noting, however, that we do not know what came of her or her case with Melton. This was not, Jones said, unusual: "There are several cases of 'runaway' monks and nuns from various religious houses in the registers. But we don't always get as much detail as this, and we don't always have the full story. Women often entered convents in adolescence, and such changes of heart about their vocation were not uncommon". Modern commentators have described Joan of Leeds as "rebellious" and "racy".

=== Fictional portrayals ===
In July 2019 The Stage announced that the story of Joan of Leeds would be performed at the New Diorama Theatre, London, in December that year, describing it as an "alternative Christmas show". The theatre advertised the production as "alt-festive Christmas show Joan of Leeds—a thoroughly immoral medieval mystery play with live music, based on the farcical true story of a nun on the run". The historical novelist Candace Robb centered her 1995 book A Nun's Tale around the story of Joan of Leeds, although she moved the chronology to a period later in the 14th century.

Joan of Leeds was set as the subject of episode 79 of The Amelia Project, season 5, released in September 2024.
