= John Booth (bishop) =

15th-century Bishop of Exeter

- Bishop of Exeter
- Arms of John Booth, Bishop of Exeter: Argent, three boar's heads erect erased sable a label of three points azure
- Province: Canterbury
- Appointed: 15 March 1465
- Term ended: 5 April 1478
- Predecessor: George Neville
- Successor: Peter Courtenay
- Previous posts: Provost of Beverley Minster, Archdeacon of Richmond, Chancellor of Cambridge University

Orders
- Consecration: 7 July 1465

Personal details
- Died: 5 April 1478 Horsley, Surrey
- Denomination: Catholic

John Booth (died 5 April 1478, Surrey) was a 15th-century English prelate who held numerous appointments in the church and royal service.

== Life ==
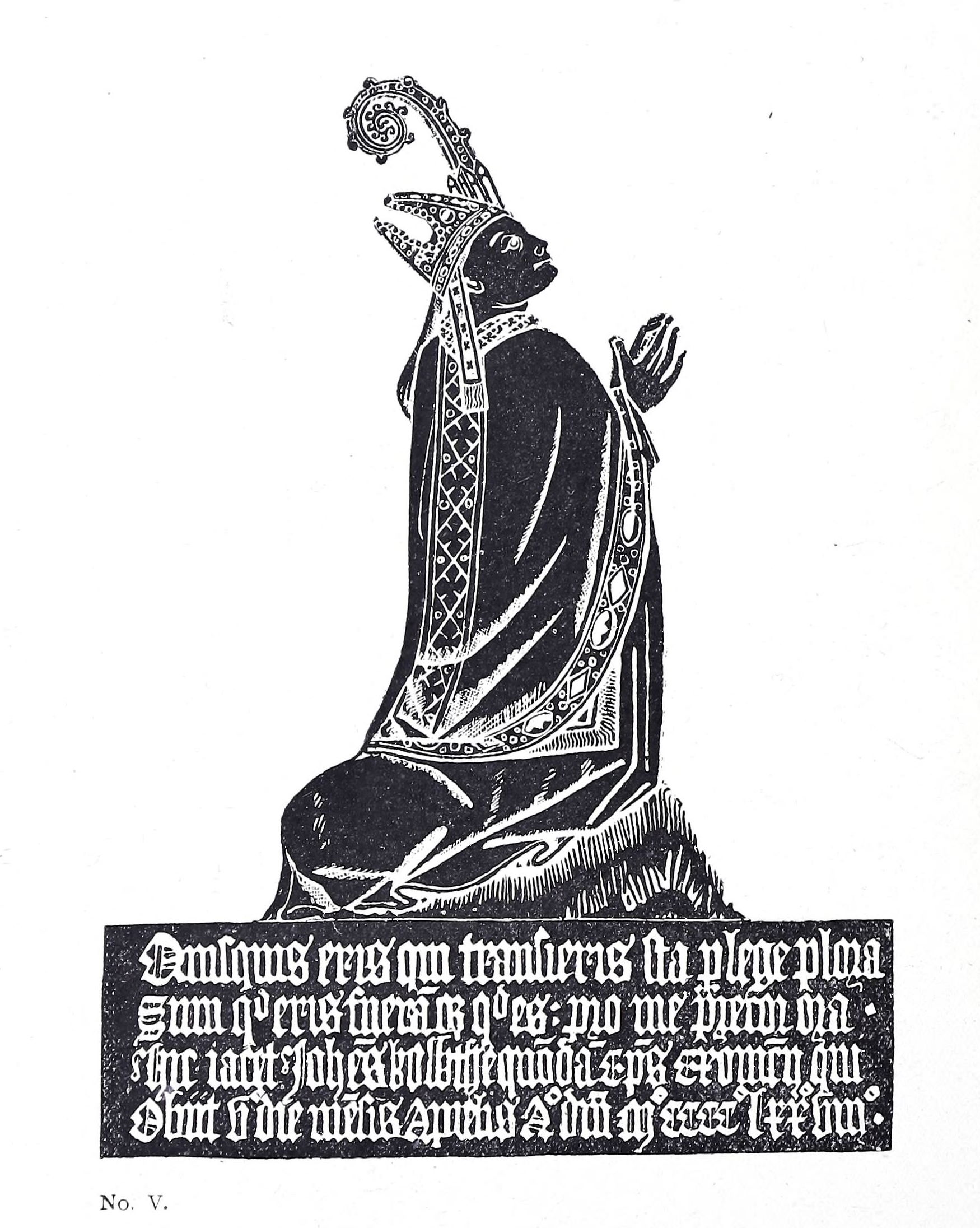
Brass monument to Bishop Booth in East Horsley Church

Booth was a scion of the ancient Cheshire family of Booth who were seated at Dunham Massey. He was a nephew of William Booth and Lawrence Booth, who both served as Archbishop of York.

In 1457 Booth was appointed the Provost of Beverley Minster and then in 1459 Archdeacon of Richmond, as well as Treasurer of Lichfield Cathedral, Canon of Sawley and Prebendary of Strensall. From 1461 until 1465, he was secretary to Edward IV, and for two of those years, 1463 and 1464, he served as the Chancellor of Cambridge University, receiving the degree of Doctor of Divinity. In 1464, he acquired the Prebendary of Bole and became Principal Secretary to Edward IV.

Booth was appointed Bishop of Exeter on 15 March 1465 and was consecrated bishop on 7 July 1465.

From 1471 to 1478, Booth served as a member of King Edward's Privy Council.

Following a visit to Croydon Palace, Booth died on 5 April 1478 at Horsley, where he was ex-officio lord of the manor.

== Citations ==
Catholic Church titles
Preceded by Lawrence Booth	Provost of Beverley Minster; 1457–1465	Succeeded by Henry Webber
Preceded by John Arundel	Archdeacon of Richmond; 1459–1465	Succeeded by John Sherwood
Preceded by George Neville	Bishop of Exeter; 1465–1478	Succeeded by Peter Courtenay
Academic offices
Preceded by Robert Woodlark	Chancellor of the University of Cambridge; 1463–1464	Succeeded by William Wilflete
