= Provost of Beverley Minster =

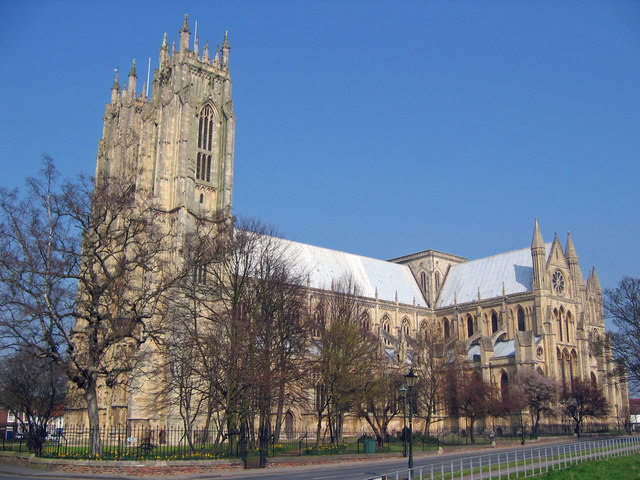
Beverley Minster

The Provost of St John's, Beverley (Beverley Minster) is a position said to have been created by Archbishop Thomas of Bayeux (1070–1100). The provost had responsibility for the administration of the lands owned by the minster and for the general revenues of the chapter. He was an external officer with authority in the government of the church, but with no stall in the choir and no vote in chapter.

Most of the provosts of Beverley were appointed as a reward for their work as civil servants. The post was finally terminated during the Reformation.

== List of Provosts ==
Source: Durham University e-theses except when otherwise stated.

- 1092–1109: Thomas (afterwards Archbishop of York, 1109–1114)
- 1109-: Robert
- c.1132: Thomas (Normannus)
- c.1135: Robert
- c.1141–1152: Thurstan
- c.1153–1154: Roger de Pont L'Évêque
- 1154–1162: Thomas Becket (afterwards Archbishop of Canterbury, 1162–1170)
- by 1169–1177: Geoffrey
- 1181–1201: Robert
- by 1202–1204: Simon of Wells (afterwards Bishop of Chichester, 1204–1207)
- 1205: Alan
- by 1212–1217: Morgan {Bishop-elect of Durham, 1215)
- 1217–1218: William
- 1218–1222: Peter de Sherburn
- 1222–c.1239: Fulk Basset (afterwards Dean of York, 1238 and Bishop of London, 1244–1259)
- 1239–1246: William de York (afterwards Bishop of Salisbury, 1246–1256)
- 1247–1264: John Maunsell
- 1265–1274: John Chishull (afterwards Bishop of London, 1274–1280}
- c.1274–1278 Geoffrey de Sancto Marco
- 1278–1294: Peter de Cestria (Peter of Chester)
- 1294–1304: Aymo de Carto {afterwards Bishop of Geneva, 1304)
- 1304–1306: Robert de Abberwick
- 1306–1308: Walter Reynolds (afterwards Bishop of Worcester, 1308)
- 1308–1317: William Melton (afterwards Archbishop of York, 1317–1340)
- 1317–1338: Nicholas de Huggate
- 1338–1360: William de la Mare
- 1360-c.1368: Richard de Ravenser
- c.1368–c.1373: Adam de Lymbergh
- 1373–1379: John de Thoresby
- 1381–1419: Robert Manfield
- 1419–1422: William Kinwolmarsh
- 1422–1427: Robert Neville (Bishop of Salisbury, 1427–1438) and Bishop of Durham, 1437–1457)
- 1427–1450: Robert Rolleston
- 1450–1457: John de Barningham
- 1457–1457: Lawrence Booth (afterwards Bishop of Durham, 1457–1476}
- 1457–1465: John Booth (afterwards Bishop of Exeter, 1465}
- 1465–1465: Henry Webber
- 1465–1467: Peter de Tastar
- 1467–1493: William Poteman
- 1493–1503: Hugh Trotter
- 1503–1525: Thomas Dalby
- 1525–1543: Thomas Wynter (also Dean of Wells, 1525-1529 and Archdeacon of Cornwall, 1537)
- 1543–c.1548: Reginald Lee
