= Hempstead Convention =

The Hempstead Convention was a ten-day assembly where 34 delegates met starting on February 28, 1665, "to settle good and known laws" according to a letter by newly appointed Governor Richard Nicolls, the first English colonial governor of the Province of New York.

Towns were invited to send two delegates who were "the most sober, able and discrete persons" chosen by taxpayers at their respective Town meetings.

== History ==
Nicolls opened the Convention by reading the Duke's Patent and his own commission. He then announced laws similar to those in New England, with one critical difference. They were less severe "in matters of conscience and of Religion." Blasphemy and witchcraft, for instance, were not included among the eleven capital crimes. Other provisions included equal taxation, trial by jury, establishment of land tenure with land being held from the Duke, and old patents were recalled and new ones required. Significant for future settlement, was that no land purchases from the Indians were to be made without consent. Every parish was required to build and maintain a church, and no minister was to officiate, who "had not received ordination from some Bishop or Minister" of the Anglican Church. Prayers for the English royal family were required and services were to be held on the historic days of Nov. 5th, January 30, and May 29. Other laws were enacted to guide the manners of the time and actions of daily life.

These laws were met by some resistance for the conferees, who had hoped for freedom equal or greater than in the new England colonies. They desired all civil officers be chosen by the freemen, all military officers by the soldiers, and that no magistrate "should have any yearly maintenance." One request that would gain strength nearly a century later was that no tax should be imposed only with the consent of deputies to the General Court. This might be considered an early expression of the concept, no taxation without representation.

Some compromises were made, though for others, Nicolls recommended if delegates wanted a greater share in government than his instructions allowed, they "must go to the King for it."

The Judiciary was also formed at this meeting. The High Sheriff of Yorkshire was to yearly appoint a Deputy for each Riding. Two Justices holding office at the Governor's pleasure, were given to each town. The towns were allowed yearly, on the first day of April, to elect a constable and eight overseers (later reduced to four). Two of the overseers were chosen to "make a rate" for maintenance of the church and clergyman, and support of the poor. From the overseers the Constable selected jurors to attend the Courts of Sessions and Assize. The Court of Assize was the highest tribunal, subordinate only to the Governor and Duke. The Governor, his Council, and the Magistrates of several towns met yearly in New York. The court held jurisdiction in suits of over twenty pounds, and appellate to lesser amounts.

At the close of the Convention, Governor Nicolls appointed William Wells of Southold as High Sheriff, Captain John Underhill as High Constable and Surveyor-General, and the following as Justices: Daniel Denton of Jamaica, John Hicks of Hempstead, Jonas Wood of Huntington, and James Hubbard of Gravesend.

High Sheriffs of Yorkshire would continue to be appointed, until counties were organized in 1683. High Sheriffs that followed included William Wells (1665–69), Robert Coe (1669–72), John Manning (1672–75), Sylvester Salisbury (1675–76), Thomas Willet (1676-79), Richard Betts, (1679–81), and John Youngs (1681-1683).

== Delegates to the Hempstead Convention ==
- Nieuw Utrecht - Jacques Cortelyou, (unnamed) Fosse
- Nieuw Amersfoordt - Elbert Elbertsen, Roeleff Martense
- Gravesend - James Hubbard, John Bowne
- Flatbasch - Jan Stryker, Hendrick Jorassen
- Boswyck - John Stealman, Guisbert Teunis
- Jamaica - Daniel Denton, Thomas Benedict
- Hempstead - John Hicks, Robert Jackson
- Oyster Bay - Captain John Underhill, Matthias Harvey
- Huntington - Jonas Wood, John Ketchum
- Brookhaven - Daniel Lane, Roger Barton
- Southold - William Wells, John Youngs
- Southampton - Thomas Topping, John Howell
- East Hampton - Thos. Baker, John Stratton
- Westchester - John Quinby, Edward Jessup
