= Sarah Rees Jones =

British historian

Sarah Rees Jones FSA
- Occupation: Historian

Academic background
- Education: University of Oxford (BA), University of York (PhD)
- Thesis: Property, Tenure and Rents: Some Aspects of Topogaphy and Economy of Medieval York (1987)

Academic work
- Discipline: History
- Sub-discipline: Medieval history
- Institutions: University of York

Sarah Ruth Rees Jones FSA (born 1957) is a British historian. She is Professor Emeritus of Medieval History and a former director of the Centre for Medieval Studies at the University of York.

== Career ==
Rees Jones received her PhD in 1987 from the University of York with a thesis titled 'Property, Tenure and Rents: Some Aspects of Topogaphy and Economy of Medieval York'.

Rees Jones is a Trustee of the Historic Towns Trust. She was elected as a Fellow of the Society of Antiquaries of London on 5 February 2009. She is also a Fellow of the Royal Historical Society.

She was the principal investigator on the team that discovered the story of Joan of Leeds; a 14th-century nun who faked her own death to leave St. Clement's Nunnery in York to live with a man in Beverley.

Rees Jones appeared on an episode of Time Team in 2005.

== Select publications ==
- Rees Jones, S. 1997. The government of medieval York: essays in commemoration of the 1396 royal charter. Borthwick Institute of Historical Research.
- Rees Jones, S., Marks, R., and Minnis, A. J., 2000. Courts and regions in medieval Europe. York Medieval Press.
- Rees Jones, S. 2003. Learning and literacy in medieval England and abroad. Brepols.
- Rees Jones, S. 2014. York: the making of a city 1068-1350. Oxford University Press.
- Rees Jones, S. and Watson, S. C. 2016. Christians and Jews in Angevin England: the York Massacre of 1190, narratives and contexts/ York Medieval Press
- Brown, S., Rees Jones, S., and Ayers, T, (eds). 2022. York: Art, Architecture, and Archaeology (The British Archaeological Association Conference Transactions XLII). Routledge.
- Dryburgh, P., and Rees Jones, S., (eds). 2024. Church and Northern English Society in the Fourteenth Century: the Archbishops of York and their Records’, York Medieval Press
