= William Melton =

English archbishop of York and royal official (died 1340)

- Archbishop of York
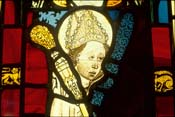
- William Melton
- Elected: December 1315
- Installed: unknown
- Term ended: 5 April 1340
- Predecessor: William Greenfield
- Successor: William Zouche
- Other post: Provost of Beverley

Orders
- Consecration: September 1317

Personal details
- Died: 5 April 1340 Cawood Palace
- Buried: York Minster
- Denomination: Roman Catholic

William Melton (died 5 April 1340) was the 43rd Archbishop of York (1317–1340) and the first Lord Privy Seal.

== Life ==
Melton was the son of Nicholas of Melton, and the brother of Henry de Melton, and John Melton. He was born in Melton in the parish of Welton, about nine miles from Kingston upon Hull. He was a contemporary of John Hotham, Chancellor of England and Bishop of Ely. The two prelates were often associated in public matters and were the most powerful churchmen of their period in England.

Melton was Controller of the Wardrobe at the accession of Edward II in 1307 and was a pluralist through and through at the time of his elevation to the see of York. Among other things, he was also Archdeacon of Barnstaple and Provost of Beverley. He was Lord Privy Seal from 1307 to about 1312, having been Dean of St. Martin's-le-Grand at that time also. He was promoted to Keeper of the Household Wardrobe from 1314 to 1316. He was elected by the chapter of York within a month of Archbishop Greenfield's death, in December 1315, but difficulties arose and he was not consecrated until September 1317, at Avignon by Pope John XXII. While serving as archbishop, Melton had to deal with numerous cases of fugitive or rebellious nuns at the Benedictine nunnery St Clement's by York, most notably Joan of Leeds.

Throughout Melton's archiepiscopate, he was actively concerned with the affairs of Scotland. Between 1318 and 1322, the Scots, under James Douglas, Lord of Douglas, made raids into Yorkshire, devastating great parts of the country, destroying churches and sacking the richest monasteries. These continued raids led to a dispute between the City of York and Melton regarding the responsibility for the upkeep of part of the city's motte and bailey defences known as the Old Baile. During the raid of 1319, the King was at the siege of Berwick and much of the trained soldiery was there with him. Archbishop Melton collected what men he could and led them against the Scots. Clergy, friars and citizens of York were accordingly gathered and the result was the Battle of Myton (12 October 1319) on the Swale, in which the English were entirely routed. Queen Isabella, who was in York at the time, managed to escape to safety at Nottingham. So many clergy died, mainly trying to swim the River Swale to escape, that Scots referred to it as the Chapter of Myton.

Connected with the Scottish raids of 1322 was the battle of Boroughbridge, in which the Earl of Lancaster was taken prisoner, led from Boroughbridge to his own castle of Pontefract and there beheaded. Archbishop Melton had aided Lancaster at one point, and seems, in consequence, to have fallen into some disfavour with Edward II. By 1325 however, the King's good opinion had been recovered, since Melton then became Lord Treasurer of England until 1326.

Melton did not desert Edward II in his latter days, regarding his imprisonment with great displeasure. Nor was he present at the coronation of Edward III, and is said afterwards to have been engaged in a dangerous intrigue to upset the new government, for which he was arrested, though acquitted. In January 1328, Melton married the young king to Philippa of Hainault. In 1330 he was reappointed Treasurer, but left the office in 1331.

=== Work and legacy ===
Melton completed the building of the nave of York Minster and his figure still remains above the great western portal. He is said to have assisted largely in building St. Patrick's Church, Patrington, in Holderness, and certainly gave much toward the fabric of Beverley Minster. He died on 5 April 1340 at Cawood Palace, and was buried in the north aisle of the nave at York Minster, a memorial window installed shortly after his death being transferred to St James' Church, High Melton in the 1790s by the Dean of York, John Fountayne.

Melton died very wealthy, having custody of many manors and estates. His heir was his nephew, William Melton of Aston, near Sheffield, who was the progenitor of one of the most powerful knightly families in the south of Yorkshire.

Melton kept a detailed log of his activities while he was Archbishop of York, published as The Register of William Melton in five volumes.

== See also ==
- Secretary of State (England)

== Citations ==
Political offices
Preceded by —	Lord Privy Seal; 1307–1312	Succeeded by Roger Northburgh
Preceded by Walter de Stapledon	Lord High Treasurer; 1325–1326	Succeeded by John de Stratford
Preceded by Robert Wodehouse	Lord High Treasurer; 1330–1331	Succeeded by William Ayermin
Catholic Church titles
Preceded by William Greenfield	Archbishop of York; 1317–1340	Succeeded by William Zouche
