= Richard of Pudlicott =

English criminal (died 1305)

Richard of Pudlicott (died 1305), also known as Richard de Podelicote (or Pudlicote, or Dick Puddlecote), was an English wool merchant who, down on his luck, became an infamous burglar of King Edward I's Wardrobe treasury at Westminster Abbey in April of 1303. Richard, along with high-ranked accomplices primarily consisting of the monks of Westminster Abbey, stole a large portion of the king's treasury of gems, antique gold and coins, estimated at over 100,000 pounds, or about equal to a year's tax revenue for the Kingdom of England. When priceless objects began flooding pawn shops, houses of prostitution and even fishing nets in the River Thames, the king and his ministers, away at war in Scotland, were alerted. King Edward began his investigation into the incident in June of 1303, which revealed the possible involvement of over 40 monks. Many dozens of people were rounded up and jailed in a wide and indiscriminate net and eventually brought to one of the biggest trials of the High Middle Ages in England. Ultimately most of the loot was recovered and a dozen or so were hanged, including Richard, but most escaped the executioner. Richard gave a false confession that he was the only one involved, saving the clergy—his inside accomplices—from being condemned. After his hanging, his body was flayed, and legend said his skin was nailed to the door of Westminster Abbey as a warning to other would-be criminals. A 2005 study of the door, dating back to the reign of King Edward I (making it the oldest door in England) revealed the legend to be false. The fragments of hide found under the door's lone surviving iron strap turned out to be from an animal hide which once covered the door.

== Richard's Confession ==
In late 1303, Richard of Pudlicott confessed to his robbery of the treasury. However, the legitimacy of this confession is disputed due to his claim that he committed the crime on his own. According to the confession, Richard, a traveling merchant of various goods, was arrested in Flanders due to an outstanding debt in Brussels, and removed of his wool by the British. Soon after, Richard sought financial compensation for this wool and took it to court in Westminster. During his time in Westminster, Richard would watch Serjeants move valuables in and out of Westminster Abbey. Poor from his prior arrest, Richard planned to steal these valuables. Beginning in August 1302, he studied the abbey, and once King Edward had left for Scotland, Richard planned to sneak into the building. Having found a ladder positioned against a nearby building, he placed it alongside a chapter house to a window, which he pried open with a knife. He then entered the building and found various silver treasures, which he stole and sold. Having studied the premises of Westminster Abbey, Richard started his plan to rob the treasury. Richard began tunneling into the Abbey on December 17th of 1302 and dug until late April of 1303. He waited until it became dark on April 24th and he entered the treasury for the first time. He remained inside the treasury, rearranging the goods he wished to steal throughout the entire next day, and left late that next night. A day later, he left with all the treasures he wished to keep and buried them beneath a cemetery gate behind the Church of St Margaret.

== Motivations and the Wool Crisis ==
Richard of Pudlicott was a wool merchant during a very difficult time for the profession. Throughout the late 13th century, England faced a severe wool crisis. A possible cause of this crisis was the taxation of King Edward I. During the 1290s, King Edward faced many battles with the Scottish and the French and went on various conquests and expeditions that proved to be expensive. Edward's taxation on wool exports, also known as the "Maltolt" began in 1275 at 6 shillings and 8 pence, or a third of a pound, but by the 1290s, King Edward raised this tax to two pounds leading to massive pushback from the public. Due to the public's response, the tax was abolished in 1297 and remained so until King Edward III's rule. Partially as a result, King Edward I was driven to reconfirm Magna Carta in the Confirmation of the Charters, stating that the king shall not tax his people without their consent. Five years later, King Edward created the Carta Mercatoria which directly violated the terms of the Confirmation of the Charters but was not revoked until 1311. Conflicts with King Edward alongside oppressive guilds who restricted entry and attempted to control local markets drove many wool merchants to relocate to the countryside. King Edward's taxation on wool exports may offer a more personal motive for why Richard had robbed him.

A slightly less vindictive motive for Richard's actions may be that England's wool supply was dwindling and Richard was left with little to no funds to fall back on. More modern research into the wool crisis shows that sheep mortality rates saw a steep increase starting in 1275. This is due to a scab and disease outbreak in sheep throughout England. Rapid population growth in Europe at this time expanded the market for England's wool, but they would be unable to meet these demands because of this increased death rate. As word of this outbreak spread throughout England in the late 1270s, many sheepherders, in an attempt to prevent the spread of disease and scabs, quickly either executed their infected stock or sold them at a low price. The mortality rates reflect that these preventative efforts did not have much of an impact. Statistics show that in 1279–1280, England's wool output fell 58% below average due to the declining sheep population, over a decade before King Edward increased the wool tax. Although the peak of this crisis occurred a few decades before the robbery, England's sheep population did not fully recover until the 14th century.

== Possible motivation of accomplices ==
Although Richard claimed to have worked alone in his confession, his trial proved multiple monks to have been accomplices, who were then executed. After many of the King's treasures began popping up throughout London, King Edward ordered an investigation into the monks of Westminster Abbey. Throughout the 1290s, King Edward relentlessly imposed taxes on the clergy to fund his wars in France and in Scotland. Edward began to seize wool and other goods from the clergy and, in 1294, demanded half of their yearly income. Edward's demands continued to drive a wedge between England and the church and, in 1297, Pope Boniface VIII issued the papal bull Clericos Laicos. Edward's persistent claims that the taxation was necessary for his army and Philip IV's embargo on precious metals and stones leaving France, crippling papal income at a moment of unrest in Rome, eventually drove Pope Boniface VIII to effectively annul the previous bull with the Etsi de Statu, allowing the clergy to be taxed in cases of necessity as determined by their kings. King Edward's high taxes on the clergy of England may have angered the monks and made them more than willing to assist or turn a blind eye to Richard and his robbery of the treasury.

== Legacy ==
In medieval England, robbery of the king was a crime certainly punishable by death. Very few British citizens had the audacity to commit such an act. Richard may have been an example of politically motivated radical action against the king and the impact of unpopular taxation on the socio-economic relations between the King and his people. If Richard held any speculated political motive for his crime against the king, it can be said that his actions anticipated the Peasants Revolt of 1381 and the many more British revolts that followed. King Edward's imposition of high taxes, especially his maltolt on wool, to finance his war on France and later against Scotland proved to be widely unpopular with the British people. This led many to protest against it, but nothing as serious as the later Peasant Revolt. The public's response may have been a sign to King Edward that taxation without consent would be met with pushback, but King Richard II's Poll Tax of 1380 would show that by the end of the 14th century, the public's opinion held little weight on the actions of the king.

=== Media ===
Pudlicott is featured in a BBC TV movie titled Heist (2008) made about the events of 1303. His character was played by Kris Marshall.
