= Council of Assizes =

The Council of Assizes, also referred to as the Court of Assize, was given power of making, altering and abolishing any laws of New York. The Court had yearly meetings. The Governor and Council attended and had complete power of the proceedings. They were joined by the High Sheriff and the Justices of the lower courts who were subservient to the Governor.

The Council of Assizes in New York was unique. New York had no charter at the time nor was it a royal province. This was due to the fact it was located on conquered territory, taken from the Dutch.

== Actions of the Council of Assizes ==
- 1665, at the first Court of Assize, held in New York, in October, 1665, the chief sachems of Long Island came and submitted to Governor Nicoll.
- 1666, Captain John Underhill serving as Chief Advisor to the Matinecock Indians presented a petition on their behalf.
