= John Mansel (administrator) =

13th-century administrator

John Mansel (died 1265), Provost of Beverley Minster, was a king's clerk and a judge. He was the leading administrator and councillor to King Henry III.

== Life ==
According to Matthew Paris, Mansel's father was a country priest. As the son of a deacon under orders, his birth status periodically came into question eventually resulting in a letter from Pope Innocent IV ratified by Pope Alexander IV in 1259 stating "Approbation, addressed to John Mansel, Chancellor of London, the King's Clerk, of the dispensation given to him, at the King's request, by Pope Innocent, to be ordained and promoted, notwithstanding that his mother married his father, a man of noble birth, not knowing that he was a deacon, and was accounted for the time being his lawful wife; his father, after some time, repenting, resumed his orders, a divorce having been declared by their diocesan. The dispensation is approved, even if his mother's plea of ignorance and the reputation of a lawful marriage cannot be sustained."

Mansel became a favorite of the young King Henry III and was appointed to the vacant prebend of Thame by Henry, but Robert Grosseteste, a reforming bishop with strong feelings about ecclesiastical rights and privileges, refused to admit him. Reportedly, Mansel took the Thame church by force before giving up his claim to the prebend (a specific type of benefice). Grosseteste, having thus vindicated his right, bestowed upon Mansel the more lucrative benefice of Maidstone. Despite the loss of the Thame benefice, Mansel probably obtained more benefices than any other contemporary clergyman as he amassed his plurality. Mansel's benefices included the livings of Haughley, Howden, and Bawburgh and prebends of Tottenhall, South Malling and Chichester. He was also Provost of Beverley (1247), Chancellor of St. Paul's, London, Dean of Wimborn, Rector of Wigan, Papal chaplain, and King's chaplain.

Mansel fought with a contingent of English under Henry de Turbeville in the aid of Frederick II, King of Germany in the north of Italy in 1238. Frederick II was married to Henry's sister Isabella in 1235. He fought alongside Henry III in the Battle of Taillebourg during the Saintonge War (20–24 July 1242) and took Peter Orige, seneschal of the Count of Boulogne, prisoner. He was reckoned not least among brave men in this unsuccessful venture against Louis IX of France. He was seriously wounded while leading an assault in the siege of the Verines monastery.

During 1246 and 1247, Mansel served as Lord Chancellor of England.

Mansel established the Augustinian priory at Bilsington, near Romney in 1253 prudently reflecting that "the king's favour is not hereditary or worldly prosperity of lasting duration." He is, however, spoken of disparagingly by the chronicling monk Matthew Paris, of St Albans Abbey, for unfairly denying legal judgment in the Abbey's favour after a monk had been attacked and robbed by his protégé, Geoffrey of Childwick.

Mansel enjoyed great secular power; the 1258 Provisions of Oxford gave four men the power to elect a council of fifteen to govern the treasury and the chancery. These four men were the Earl Marshal (the Earl of Norfolk), Hugh Bigod, John Mansel, and the Earl of Warwick (John du Plessis). Not only did he arrange the marriage of Henry III daughter, Margaret of England, to Alexander III of Scotland in 1249, but he also entertained the courts of England and Scotland on King Alexander's visit to London in 1256. Such a feat would not have been possible but for the income from his pluralities. He was named Seneschal of Gascony in 1243, a post later held by Simon de Montfort, 6th Earl of Leicester and subsequently by Prince Edward. Alfonso of Castile had his eyes on Gascony, and John Mansel helped to defuse the situation by arranging the marriage of Edward to Alfonso's half-sister, Eleanor in 1254. Sedgwick Castle came into his hands in 1249. In 1261, he was named Constable of the Tower of London. He was a mediator along with Simon de Montfort in arranging the marriage of Henry's daughter Beatrice with John of Brittany in 1259. John Mansel was in France with Queen Eleanor and Edmund when Simon de Montfort vanquished Henry III at the Battle of Lewes, 14 May 1264. Shortly thereafter, Simon de Montfort took possession of Mansel's estates in August 1264.

In his biography of Henry, the historian David Carpenter commented on Eleanor's return to England in October 1265: "There was one person who did not return with the queen: John Mansel. With Eleanor throughout her exile, he had died in January 1265. Courageous, wise, and moderate, he was the best minister the king ever had. Henry could have done with him now." Mansel's will does not appear to have been carried out, apart from a bequest of Bilsington Priory to King Henry. The rest of his estate was treated as crown escheat.
