= Heist (2008 film) =

- Written by: Peter Harness
- Directed by: Justin Hardy
- Starring: Kris Marshall
- Country of origin: United Kingdom
- Original language: English
- No. of episodes: 1

Production
- Producer: Susan Horth
- Cinematography: Douglas Hartington
- Editor: Michael Harrowes
- Running time: 70 mins

Original release
- Network: BBC Four
- Release: 23 April 2008

Heist is a one-off 2008 television comedy-drama, written by Peter Harness and directed by Justin Hardy. It was completed at the end of 2006 and first broadcast on 23 April 2008 on BBC Four as part of its Medieval season. Loosely based on real events surrounding Richard of Pudlicott, it is a parody of and/or homage to heist films, set in medieval England, using several of that genre's conventions (such as the raid being "one last job", and the use of an unintelligent but physically strong figure), and trailed under the same tagline as the 2003 remake of The Italian Job ("Get in, get out, get even"). As per the medieval setting, the film dialogue contains several Middle English and pseudo-Middle English expressions and insults (some of which are translations of modern-English insults or rhyming slang - "mother-swyver" instead of "motherfucker", or "it's all gone a bit church gong" instead of "it's all gone a bit Pete Tong", for example). Marshall as lead character narrates several parts of the backstory to the audience during the film.

== Plot ==
In 1303, the innkeeper and would-be wool-merchant Dick Puddlecote is arrested and imprisoned in Flanders after traveling there from England to trade wool. Before he could receive the money, he was imprisoned, as punishment for the English monarch Edward I having defaulted on a loan from Flanders.

On his release, Dick returns to England, where he finds Edward has taken over his inn and forced his girlfriend Joanna the Concubine into prostitution. Dick vows revenge on the King for all this and begins to gather his friends to attempt an audacious robbery on the king's treasury beneath Westminster Abbey.

== Reception ==
- The Guardian - One critic called it unsubtle, and "Carry On in Ye Olde Worlde England...[or] Blackadder meets Bill and Ted meets Lock, Stock and Two Smoking Barrels", adding that "It is very, very silly. It's also way too long. But I laughed out loud on several occasions" Another stated it was a "romp [that] seems to have stumbled in from BBC Three. In fact, were it not for the nudity and the swearing, it could easily sit on CBBC"
- The Telegraph - Its critic called it "an embarrassingly desperate attempt to demonstrate that Hey, Studying the Middle Ages Can Be Fun" and as having "not so much a naturally playful imagination as a teeth-gritted determination to appear wacky at all costs"
- The Independent - Despite "tiny traces of real history [remaining]" and "the odd good joke", its critic also criticised "its wearying dependency on the verb "swiving" " and argued that "even historical impurists may have hankered for a little more hard fact in among the "cack" jokes and the cinematic pranks"
- The Times - Its critic initially found "the mix of period and contemporary-speak .. irritating [and] the jerky camera and laddish bravura ... derivative", but did state that it had "some groovy conceits" and praised the cartoons and James's and Sumpter's performances.

== Cast ==
- Kris Marshall as Dick Puddlecote
- Geraldine James as Joanna
- Donald Sumpter as Edward I
- Michael Dunning as Ramage
- Bennet Warden as Irish Pete
- Paul Hilton as Warefield
- Linal Haft as Newmarket
- Tim Plester as Will
