= John de Newbery =

English Canon of Windsor (fl. 1350s-1360s)

John de Newbery (fl. 1350s - 1360s) was a Canon of Windsor from 1353 to 1355.

== Career ==
He was appointed:

- Treasurer of Queen Isabella's Household
- keeper of the king's household wardrobe 1359 - 1361

He was appointed to the tenth stall in St George's Chapel, Windsor Castle in 1353 and held the canonry until 1355.
