= Wardrobe (government) =

Department of the king's household in medieval and early modern England

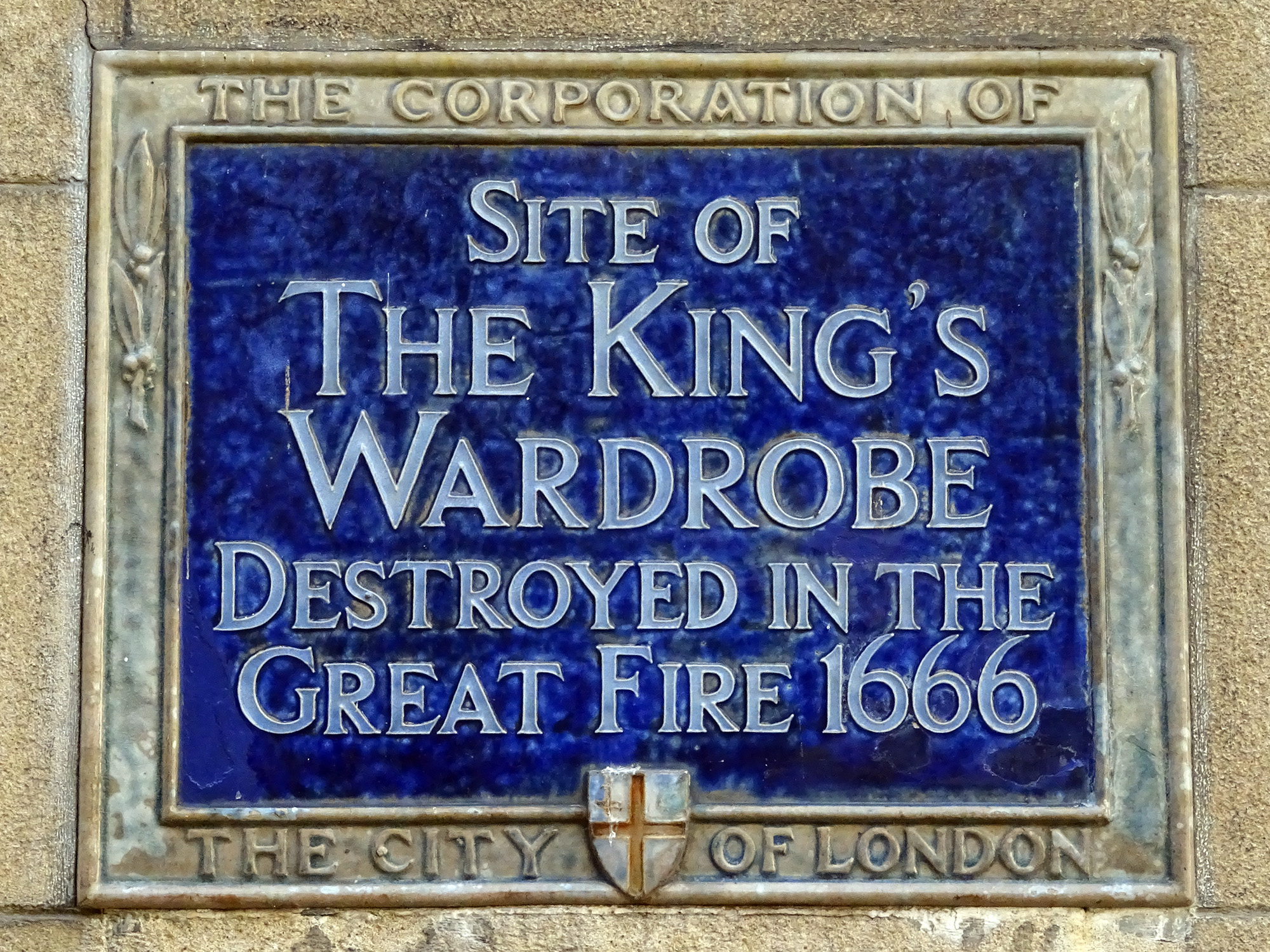
Blue plaque showing the former site of the King's Wardrobe

The King's Wardrobe, together with the Chamber, made up the personal part of medieval English government known as the King's household. Originally the room where the king's clothes, armour, and treasure were stored, the term was expanded to describe both its contents and the department of clerks who ran it. Early in the reign of Henry III the Wardrobe emerged out of the fragmentation of the Curia Regis to become the chief administrative and accounting department of the Household. The Wardrobe received regular block grants from the Exchequer for much of its history; in addition, however, the wardrobe treasure of gold and jewels enabled the king to make secret and rapid payments to fund his diplomatic and military operations, and for a time, in the 13th-14th centuries, it eclipsed the Exchequer as the chief spending department of central government.

There were in fact two main Wardrobes for much of this period: around 1300 the Great Wardrobe, responsible only for expenditure on such things as clothing, textiles, furs and spices, split away from the more senior Wardrobe, which remained responsible for financing the king's personal expenditure and his military operations. In addition there were smaller Privy Wardrobes at various royal palaces; most of these provided items for the personal use of the king when in residence, but the Privy Wardrobe in the Tower of London came to specialize in the storage and manufacture of armour and armaments, and as such it too developed into an autonomous department of the State.

By the 15th century the Wardrobe had lost much of its earlier influence, and it eventually merged entirely into the Household and lost its separate identity. At the same time, the Great Wardrobe began to be referred to, more simply, as "the Wardrobe", to some extent taking on the identity of its forebear; but in the sixteenth century the Great Wardrobe lost its independence (it continued in existence as a subsidiary department within the Royal Household until it was abolished by the Civil List and Secret Service Money Act 1782).

== The King's (or Household) Wardrobe ==
=== Origins and early development ===
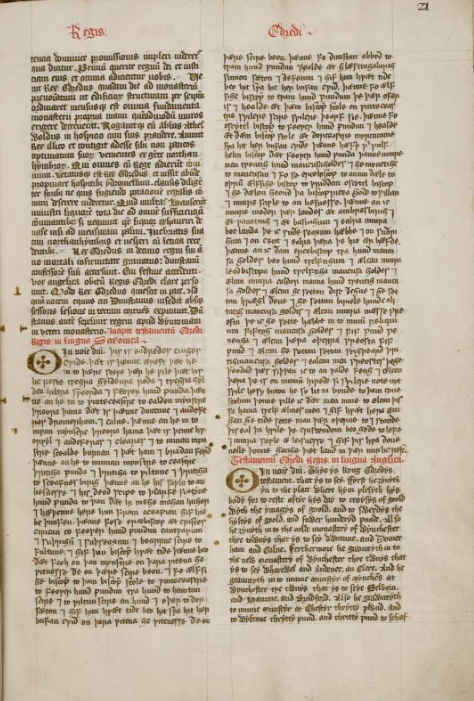
The Will of King Eadred, AD 951–955, with bequests to hræglðene (robe-keepers) (15th-century copy, British Library Add MS 82931, ff. 22r–23r)

In the Middle Ages persons of wealth and power often slept in a chamber (Latin camera), alongside which a secure room or wardrobe (garderoba) would be provided for storage of clothes and other valuables. In the royal household, the Chamber came to represent the king's nearest advisers. Before long the Wardrobe emerged, under the auspices of the Chamber, to become an administrative body in its own right, providing secure storage for the robes, treasures, archives and armaments of the king. Like other offices of the household it was an itinerant operation: carts and cases containing valuables travelled with the king and his court as they moved from place to place around the realm.

Prior to the 13th century references to the Wardrobe and its keepers are few. The 10th-century King Eadred bequeathed substantial sums of money in his will to his hrœgelthegns (robe-keepers), which may suggest that these were persons of some importance. By the reign of Henry II the king's Wardrobe is identified as a 'place of safe deposit' with its own staff, and its own premises within various royal palaces or strongholds; there remained, however, a good deal of functional overlap between the Chamber and the Wardrobe.

=== The rise of the Wardrobe ===
After 1200, however, the Wardrobe grew in activity and in prestige, partly as a result of King John's constant travelling of the realm, which required a more immediate source of funds than the fixed Exchequer. The Wardrobe first rivalled, and then eclipsed the Chamber in terms of power within the Court and in relation to the governance of the realm. Thus we see, early in the reign of Henry III, the office of Treasurer of the Chamber annexed to (and taken over by) that of Keeper of the Wardrobe. At around the same time the Keeper's deputy (the Controller of the Wardrobe) was given oversight of the Privy Seal (which had first come into use within the Chamber). This meant that the Wardrobe, which already served as a repository of important documents and Charters, began producing them as well; and thenceforward its Controller tended to be an important and trusted adviser to the king. With these developments, a third official, the Cofferer of the Wardrobe, began to take increasing responsibility for the day-to-day business of the Wardrobe.

The administrative historian T. F. Tout has speculated that a reason for the Wardrobe's increasing influence was its "new and elastic" nature: it was not hidebound by restrictive traditions or customary ways of working. Moreover, it was able to respond quickly in times when speedy expenditure was required – most especially in time of war – and with a flexibility which suited both the monarch and the nascent powers of English government. It did so largely by securing loans, on the basis of its valuable assets and treasures, from Italian bankers (the Riccardi and the Frescobaldi). In this way the Wardrobe became an independently powerful financial office.

There was however also a political dimension to the Wardrobe's rise. As G. M. Trevelyan put it, "If one office…was secured by the baronial opposition, the King could dive underground and still govern the country through the Wardrobe": hence the baronial demand in 1258 that all money should in future go through the Exchequer.

During the reign of Edward I, the Wardrobe was at the height of its power as a financial, administrative and military department of the Household and State. It was "the brain and hand of the Court". Its seal, the Privy Seal, no longer functioned solely as the personal seal of the King, but began to serve as a second, and somewhat less formal, State seal alongside the Great Seal of the Realm. (The fact that the Privy Seal invariably travelled with the King and his Court often made it quicker and easier to use than the Great Seal, which remained in the custody of the Chancellor). It was by letters authenticated by this seal that officials across the Kingdom received their instructions, as did both the Exchequer and the Chancery (the two main offices of State outside the Household); those serving in the armed forces were paid through the Wardrobe accounts. The Keeper or Treasurer of the Wardrobe was considered (alongside the Steward) to be one of the two chief officers of the Household at this time.

The Wardrobe was still at this point an itinerant operation, but it did maintain two permanent 'Treasuries': one in the Tower of London (forerunner of the Great Wardrobe – see below), and one in the crypt of the Chapter House of Westminster Abbey. It was the latter that served as the main repository for the royal jewels, plate, coin and bullion through the 13th century; but, following the burglary of the contents of this Treasury in 1303 by a certain Richard Pudlicott (who was assisted by some of the abbey's monks), the bulk of the remaining treasure was removed to the Tower (including items of coronation regalia, such as are still stored at the Tower to this day).

=== Its influence fades ===
Toward the end of Edward's reign, a series of costly wars took their toll on the Wardrobe's hitherto independent means. Then, during the reign of Edward II, concerted efforts were made to reassert traditional rights of the Chancery and the Exchequer, and to limit the authority of the Wardrobe. For example, 1307 saw a separate Keeper of the Privy Seal appointed; over the next few decades the Privy Seal developed into a minor office of state, operating alongside the Office of Chancery, outside both Wardrobe and Household. Then in 1311 a series of Ordinances were issued by barons opposed to the King, a number of which reasserted the status quo ante over recent Wardrobe innovations; for example, ordinance 8 insisted that the Exchequer alone was to receive taxes and other state revenue. Later, under Edward III, any ongoing conflicts over the confusion of authority between the wardrobe and the exchequer were finally resolved when William Edington, Treasurer in the mid-fourteenth century, effected a number of reforms which brought the Wardrobe firmly under the financial oversight of the Exchequer.

It was around this time that the Wardrobe began to be known as the Household Wardrobe: this was in part to differentiate it from the increasingly autonomous 'Great Wardrobe' (see below), but it also reflects the fact that the wardrobe was by now losing its wider influence. In England, its business was restricted now to Household administration; and although it retained greater influence when accompanying the King and Court overseas, it did so only as a subsidiary arm of the Exchequer. (Likewise at times of war it remained an important source of funds but operated under the authority of the Exchequer, in contrast to earlier times when it had functioned as a largely independent 'war treasury'; the Battle of Crécy and its aftermath was the last period of military campaigning for which the Wardrobe itself provided significant funds.)

With the Wardrobe under increasing scrutiny, the King began to look to the erstwhile-dormant Chamber as providing a more effective structure for overseeing his personal administration and finances. It is there that the beginnings of a privy purse are seen under Edward II, alongside a 'secret seal' which the King now used for personal correspondence in place of the Privy Seal; and under Edward II and Edward III the chief Chamberlain began to re-emerge as a key person of influence within the Household.

By the reign of Richard II, the Chamber had re-established its seniority within the Household, and the Wardrobe then 'ceased to be the directive force of the household, remaining simply as the office of household accounts'. Rather than being a separate department, the Wardrobe and its officers now came under the authority of the Steward, and before long, even within the Household, the Wardrobe began to lose its separate identity: by the late 14th century, its senior officers were more often than not referred to as the Treasurer of the Household, Controller of the Household and Cofferer of the Household (rather than as "Treasurer/Controller/Cofferer of the Household Wardrobe"). Despite this gradual demise of the Wardrobe, these three officers remained (and two of them still remain) as senior officers of the Household who are also members of the Government. A vestige of the Wardrobe's former significance is seen in the 15th century, when in time of conflict the Treasurer of the Household was also frequently appointed 'Treasurer of Wars'.

== Emergence of the Great Wardrobe ==
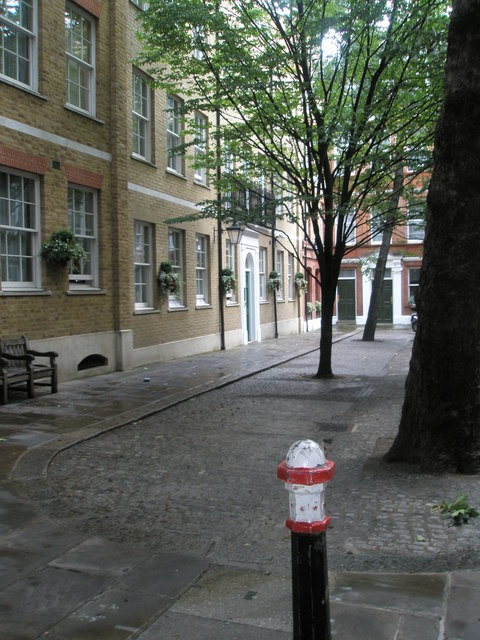
Wardrobe Place in the City of London, built on the site of the Great Wardrobe

In the course of the 13th century a distinct organisation began to be identified within the Wardrobe: it came to be known (rather confusingly) as the Great Wardrobe (the word 'Great' referring perhaps to the size of items being stored, not to the importance of the office).

=== Origin and purpose ===
The Great Wardrobe dealt with a variety of commodities ranging from cloth, tapestries, clothing, and furniture to sugar, spices, dried fruit, and pepper; and it later became a repository (and indeed manufactory) of jewellery and other treasures, tents, saddles, bridles, armour, and other military items. What all these items had in common was that they were more or less non-perishable and could be stored long-term if not required for immediate use; the Great Wardrobe originated as the department of the King's Wardrobe which was primarily concerned with the storage of such items when not required by the itinerant Court. Part of its distinctiveness, from an early date, was its employment of city merchants and specialist craftsmen, who better knew the particulars of these commodities than did the Wardrobe clerks.

=== Establishment in the 13th century ===
The term Great Wardrobe (magna garderoba) first appears in 1253. The older Wardrobe had, by this time, developed into a sophisticated bureaucratic and financial office, and its staff had less time (or inclination) to be occupied with the day-to-day matters of storekeeping. Nevertheless, storekeeping remained a practical necessity as the Wardrobe, along with the rest of the royal household, continued to travel with the King as part of his Court, accompanied by the goods and chattels for which it was responsible. It clearly made sense for at least some of these items to be kept in a more settled location.

The 'Great Wardrobe' was the name given to this more centralised system of storage; initially, however, there was no single Great Wardrobe location. A majority of items were stored in the Tower of London (London having proved to be the most convenient point of distribution), but others were stored elsewhere according to where they might be needed: indeed, several palaces and castles had their own Great Wardrobe storerooms (some of these were designed for storage of specific items, being located close to a place of specialized manufacture or trade; for example, the Prior of St Ives was required to maintain a storehouse for items purchased by the Wardrobe from the famous cloth market at nearby St Ives, Cambridgeshire.)

Throughout the 13th century the Great Wardrobe remained a subsidiary operation within the more senior Wardrobe; and despite the above-mentioned moves toward greater centralisation, the officers of the Great Wardrobe continued to travel with the Court at this time. If the King was due to stay in a place for any length of time (or, indeed, if he was engaged on a military campaign at home or abroad) it remained necessary for many of the Great Wardrobe's items to be transported with him in long convoys of wagons (described in the wardrobe accounts as "caravans").

=== Diversification in the 14th century ===
By the fourteenth century the Great Wardrobe had branched into manufacturing (in addition to its duties of purchase, storage and distribution of non-perishable goods) and numbered the King's Tailor, Armourer, Pavilioner and Confectioner among its officials. Nevertheless, it still remained in essence a sub-department of the Household Wardrobe up until 1324, whereupon it gained significant autonomy by being made accountable to the Exchequer rather than to the Wardrobe of the Household. It also began to travel less with the King's Court, and, significantly, began to put down roots outside the Tower in the City of London (its staff necessarily had regular dealings with the City's merchants). This was in part due to lack of space: the Tower was becoming a specialist store and manufacturing base for arms and armour (responsibility for which soon devolved upon a new branch, the Privy Wardrobe – see below).

Arms and armour remained at the Tower, as did the royal jewels and other valuable items, but much else was moved out. From around 1300 the Great Wardrobe had begun to rent properties in the City to provide extra storage and office space. It made use of a series of properties, including in Bassishaw and in Lombard Street, all the while retaining foothold in the Tower. Then, in 1362 it obtained a more suitable property (which itself became known as The Wardrobe) to the north of Baynard's Castle; and there it was to remain for the next three centuries. The property, a mansion set in its own grounds, which had formerly belonged to Sir John de Beauchamp, provided not only storage, office and meeting rooms, but lodgings for staff, a residence for the Keeper and space for several small manufactories. The nearby parish church is known to this day as St Andrew-by-the-Wardrobe. With its permanent establishment in these headquarters, the Great Wardrobe may be considered to have become less a part of the King's Household and more "a small, self-contained government office".

== Emergence of the Privy Wardrobe ==
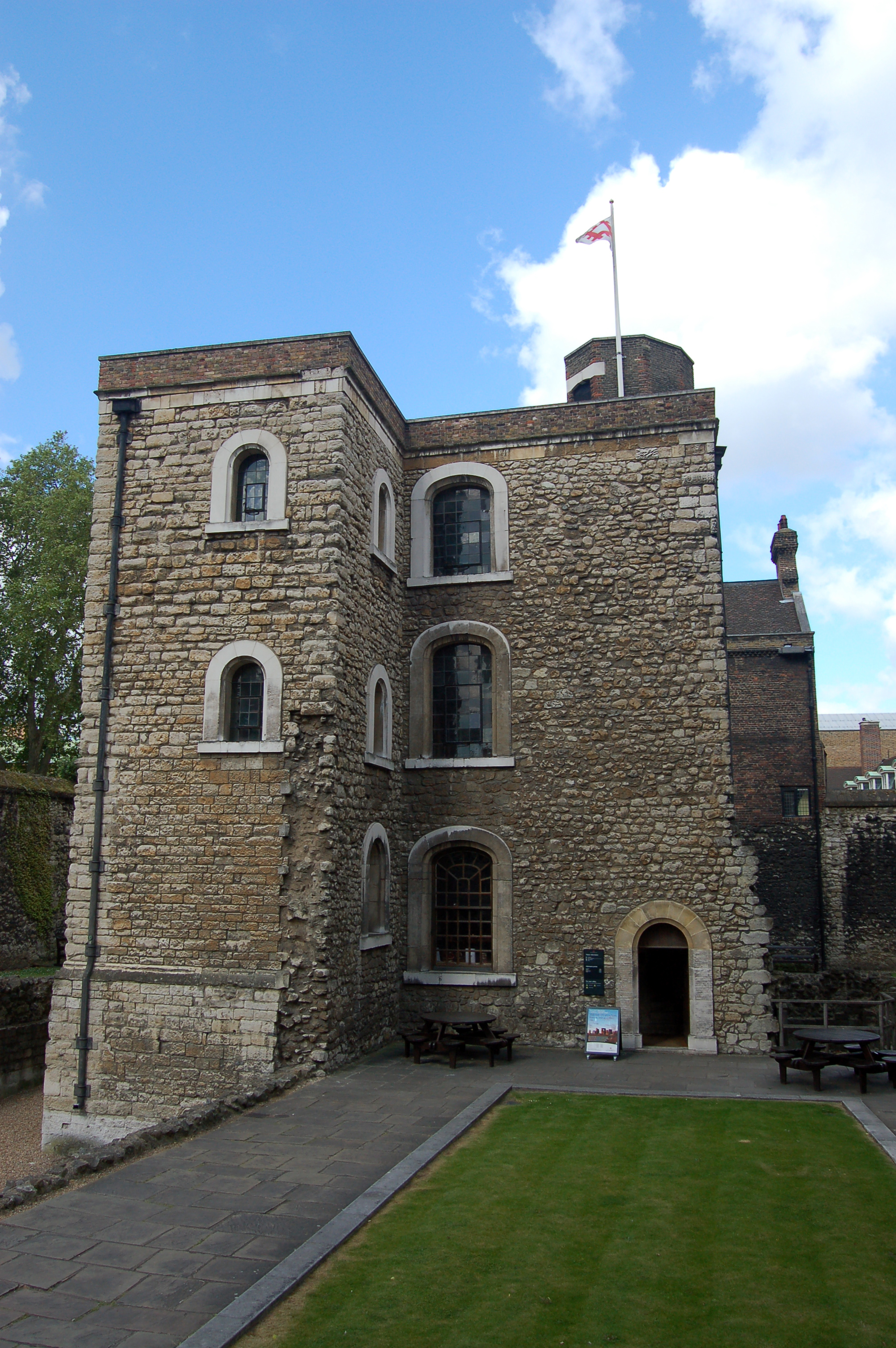
The Jewel Tower housed a branch of the King's Privy Wardrobe at the Palace of Westminster

Mention is made of a Privy Wardrobe (parva garderoba) from the 1220s onwards. To begin with, the phrase appears to indicate a room (or type of room) used to store the King's robes, armour and arms. By the end of the 13th century, the same phrase clearly refers to a small organisation headed by a Clerk, within the main Wardrobe, which would travel with the Court and furnish the king with these and other personal items. The itinerant Privy Wardrobe continued to operate and to provide for the king on his travels, even when the Court as a whole had ceased to be mobile (it was later known as the Removing Wardrobe). The central Privy Wardrobe at the Tower of London, however, took on a new identity, and rose in prominence and power, becoming the main official repository and provider of arms, armour and ordnance in the Kingdom of England.

=== Specialisation of the Privy Wardrobe at the Tower ===
By the 14th century, the Tower of London had become well established as a convenient and safe place for storage of arms and armour, jewels and plate; so when the Great Wardrobe departed these items stayed put. Arms had been manufactured within the Tower since the previous century; the local wardrobe staff had valuable experience and the Tower itself was strategically well-placed for fast distribution. Already in the 1330s, prior to the departure of the Great Wardrobe, the local 'Privy Wardrobe at the Tower' had begun to specialize in this work, and after 1361 it, in turn, took on a degree of financial and administrative independence (becoming directly accountable to the Exchequer rather than the royal household). It was superseded in the mid-15th century by the Office of Armoury and the Office of Ordnance (both also based at the Tower), whereupon the Privy Wardrobe's funding ceased and it largely faded from influence (though it continued to have a nominal role until the latter part of the same century).

== Other wardrobes ==
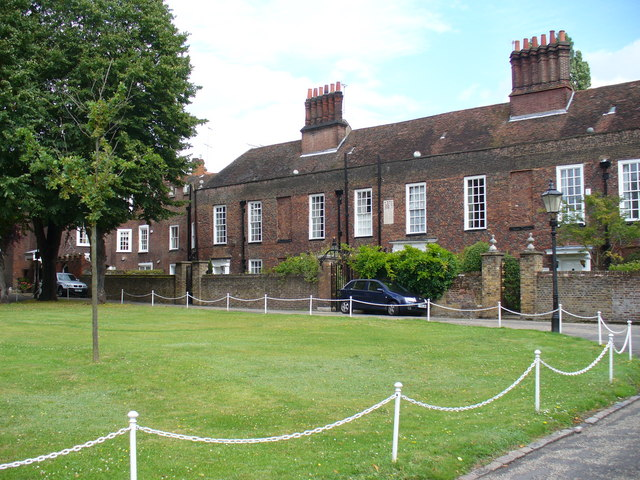
Building known as The Wardrobe on the site of Richmond Palace

Other members of the Royal Family had their own separate wardrobes, which (like the King's Wardrobe) were departments staffed by clerks. The first known Queen's Wardrobe was that of Eleanor of Provence (consort of Henry III); her Wardrobe had a high degree of autonomy, and accounted directly to the Exchequer; later Queens' Wardrobes were more likely to be subsidiary departments of the King's Wardrobe. A Prince's Wardrobe was established for Edward of Caernarfon (the future Edward II) and for other children of the sovereign over successive reigns. Furthermore, several Peers, Bishops and others set up and maintained their own personal Wardrobes along similar lines to that of the monarch in the 13th-15th centuries; the wardrobe accounts of some reveal levels of household (and military) expenditure to rival that of contemporary royalty.

In the later 14th century, when the King's court was less mobile, several small separate Wardrobes were established in castles or palaces used by the Royal Family, each with their own keeper. A 16th-century Household inventory from the reign of Edward VI lists thirteen such local wardrobes, along with a distinct 'Wardrobe of Robes' (garderoba robarum), the Removing Wardrobe (see Privy Wardrobe above), and the still-extant Great Wardrobe.

== Lists of the Chief Officers of the Wardrobe ==
=== The (Household) Wardrobe ===
==== Clerk, Keeper or Treasurer of the Wardrobe ====
The chief officer of the Wardrobe was initially termed Clerk of the Wardrobe. The first known clericus de garderoba was one Odo in the reign of King John, who oversaw a small department of carters (to handle the carts), sumpters (to handle the horses), porters (to handle the goods) and other workers. As the Wardrobe grew, both in size and sophistication, a larger number of clerks (who were clergy skilled in administration) were employed, and the chief official came to be distinguished with the title of Keeper of the Wardrobe. From 1232, when the post of Treasurer of the Chamber was merged into the keepership, the terms Keeper, Treasurer and (still) Clerk were used more or less interchangeably; but in the reign of Edward II Treasurer of the Wardrobe emerged as the preferred title. As such, according to an ordinance of 1279, he had charge of the King's expenses (and those of his family), was entrusted with receipt of all money, jewels and presents made to the King, and was responsible for keeping a daily account of all transactions of the Household.

- 1213–1215: Odo
- 1218–1224: Peter de Rivaux (jointly from 1222)
- 1222–1232: Walter of Brackley (later Bishop of Ossory) (jointly)
- 1224–1231: Walter of Kirkham (later Bishop of Durham) (jointly)
- 1224–1227: Ranulph le Breton (jointly)
- 1232–1234: Peter de Rivaux
- 1234–1236: Walter of Kirkham
- 1236–1240: Geoffrey the Templar
- 1240–1241: Peter of Aigueblanche (later Bishop of Hereford) and William de Burgh
- 1241–1254: Peter Chaceporc
- 1255–1257: Artaud of Saint-Romain
- 1257–1258: Peter de Rivaux
- 1258–1261: Aubrey of Fecamp
- 1261–1261: Peter of Winchester
- 1261–1263: Henry of Ghent
- 1264–1265: Ralph Sandwich (later Mayor of London, 1285)
- 1265–1268: Nicholas of Lewknor
- 1268–1272: Peter of Winchester
- 1272–1274: Philip Willoughby (later Chancellor of the Exchequer, 1283)
- 1274–1274: Antony Bek (later Bishop of Durham)
- 1274–1280: Thomas Bek (later Bishop of St Davids)
- 1280–1290: William of Louth
- 1290–1295: Walter Langton (afterwards Lord High Treasurer)
- 1295–1309: John Droxford (afterwards Bishop of Bath and Wells)
- 1309–1311: Ingelard Warley
- 1312–1312: Peter Collingbourn
- 1312–1314: Ingelard Warley
- 1314–1316: William Melton (afterwards Archbishop of York, 1317)
- 1316–1322: Roger Northburgh (afterwards Bishop of Coventry and Lichfield, 1321)
- 1322–1323: Roger Waltham
- 1323–1328: Robert Wodehouse (afterwards Chancellor of the Exchequer, 1330)
- 1328–1329: Richard Bury (Dean of Wells)
- 1329–1331: Thomas Garton
- 1331–1334: Robert Tawton (Archdeacon of Durham)
- 1334–1337: Edmund Ferriby
- 1337–1338: Edmund de la Beche
- 1338–1340: William Norwell
- 1340–1341: William Cusance
- 1341–1344: William Edington
- 1344–1347: Walter Wetwang
- 1347–1349: Thomas Clopton
- 1349–1350: William Cusance
- 1350–1353: William de Retford
- 1353–1357: John Buckingham
- 1357–1358: William de Retford
- 1358–1359: Henry Walton
- 1359–1360: William Farley
- 1360–1361: William Ferriby
- 1361–1366: William Manton
- 1366–1368: William Gunthorpe
- 1368–1369: Thomas Brantingham (later Bishop of Exeter)
- 1369–1375: Henry Wakefield
- 1375–1376: William Moulsoe
- 1376–1377: Richard Beverley
- 1377–1390: William Pakington
- 1390–1399: John Carp
- 1399–1401: Thomas Tutbury
- 1401–1405: Thomas More
- 1405–1406: Richard Kingston
- 1406–1408: Sir John Tiptoft
- 1409–1413: Sir John Brownfleet
- 1413: Thomas More
- 1413–1416: Sir Roger Leche
- 1416–1420: Sir John Rothenall
- 1421: Sir Walter Beauchamp
- 1421–1422: Sir William Philip
- 1423–1431: John Hotoft
- 1431–1437: Sir John Tirell
- 1437–1439: Sir John Popham
- 1439–1446: Sir Roger Fiennes
- 1446–1453: John Stourton, 1st Baron Stourton
- 1453–1454: John Sutton, 1st Baron Dudley
- 1454–1456: William Fallan
- 1456–1458: John Brecknock
- 1458–1460: Sir Thomas Tuddenham
- 1460: Sir Gervais Clifton
- 1460–1461: Sir Walter Skull
- 1461–1468: Sir John Fogge
- 1468–1470: Sir John Howard
- 1470–1471: Sir John Delves
- 1471–1474: John, Lord Howard
- 1474–1483: Sir John Elrington
- 1483: Richard Beauchamp
- 1483–1484: Sir William Hopton
- 1484: Sir Richard Croft

==== Controller of the Wardrobe ====
The primary responsibility of the Controller of the Wardrobe was to check and control the Keeper/Treasurer's expenditure by keeping a counter roll of the Wardrobe accounts; he went on to have responsibility for checking financial compliance and quality control across various departments of the Household. The office dates from the 1230s. The Controller also had charge of the Wardrobe's archive of state documents, which gave his office a distinctively secretarial flavour. Under Edward I the Controller was custodian of the Privy Seal and functioned as the King's private secretary; meanwhile his small department of clerks played a key part in the administrative oversight of the entire Household. By the end of the reign of Edward III this important court official was known as Controller of the Household.

- 1234–1236 William of Haverhill
- 1236–1240 Thomas of Newark
- 1240–1244 William of Burgh
- 1244–1249 William Hardel
- 1249–1252 William of Kilkenny
- ?1252–1257 Aubrey of Fécamp
- ?1257–1261 John of Sutton (acting)
- 1261–1268 Peter of Winchester
- 1268–1272 Giles of Oudenarde
- 1272–1283 Thomas Gunneys
- 1283–1290 William March
- 1290 Walter Langton (afterwards Keeper of the Wardrobe)
- 1290–1295 John Droxford (afterwards Keeper of the Wardrobe)
- 1295–1305 John Benstead (afterwards Chancellor of the Exchequer)
- 1305–1307 Robert Cottingham
- 1307–1314 William Melton (Lord Privy Seal)
- 1314–1316 Robert Wodehouse
- 1316–1318 Thomas Charlton (later Bishop of Hereford)
- 1318–1320 Gilbert Wigton
- 1320–1323 Robert Baldock (Archdeacon of Middlesex)
- 1323 Robert Wodehouse (afterwards Keeper of the Wardrobe)
- 1323–1326 Robert Holden
- 1326–1328 Nicholas Huggate
- 1328–1329 Thomas Garton (afterwards Keeper of the Wardrobe)
- 1329–1330 John Melbourne
- 1330–1331 Peter Medbourne
- 1331–1334 Richard Ferriby
- 1334–1335 William de la Zouch (afterwards Lord Privy Seal and Dean of York)
- 1335–1337 Edmund de la Beche (afterwards Keeper of the Wardrobe)
- 1337–1338 William Norwell (afterwards Keeper of the Wardrobe)
- 1338–1341 Richard Nateby
- 1341–1342 Robert Kilsby
- 1342–1344 Walter Wetwang (afterwards Keeper of the Wardrobe)
- 1344–1350 William Dalton
- 1350–1352 William Shrewsbury
- 1352–1353 John Buckingham
- 1353–1358 James Beaufort
- 1358–1359 William Farley
- 1359–1360 William Clee
- 1360–1368 Hugh Segrave
- 1368–1376 Sir John of Ypres
- 1376–1377 William Street
- 1377–1381 Reginald Hilton
- 1381–1397 Sir Baldwin Raddington
- 1397–1399 Sir John Stanley

==== Cofferer of the Wardrobe ====
The office of Cofferer of the Wardrobe originated in the late 13th century when the Treasurer/Keeper's chief clerk took on particular responsibility for drafting the Wardrobe accounts. Working closely with the Treasurer, the Cofferer usually served as locum tenens when the Treasurer was otherwise engaged with affairs of state (as was often the case); thus the Cofferer came to be seen as, in effect, the working head of the Wardrobe, acting on the Treasurer's behalf. In his own right he oversaw a small accounting office, staffed by the 'clerks of the Cofferer', who went on to play a key role in the financial oversight of the Household; this was a precursor to the Board of Green Cloth).

=== The Great Wardrobe ===
As early as the 1220s certain persons are identified as having a specialised role as 'buyer' or 'purveyor' within the King's Wardrobe, and keeping their own accounts. Often the King's tailor had this task (which involved purchase of silk, cloth, furs and the like for robes). A Household Ordinance of 1279 formalised the arrangement, ordaining that the Treasurer (Keeper) of the Wardrobe should appoint a man to buy all items appertaining to the Great Wardrobe, "and let this man be Keeper of the Great Wardrobe". By the 16th century the department had gained a great deal of independence, and its keeper began to be styled Master of the Great Wardrobe.

==== Keepers and Masters of the Great Wardrobe ====
- 1279–1282: Giles of Oudenarde
- 1282–1287: Hamo de la Legh
- 1287–1295: Roger de Lisle
- 1295–1300: John Husthwaite
- 1300–1320: Ralph Stokes
- 1320: William Cusance
- 1321: Gilbert Wigton
- 1323: Thomas Ousefleet
- 1327–1329: Thomas Ousefleet
- 1329–1334: William de la Zouch (later Archbishop of Canterbury)
- 1334–1335: Edmund de la Beche
- 1335–1337: William Norwell
- 1337–1341: Thomas Cross
- 1341–1345: John de Charneles
- 1345–1349: John Cook
- 1349–1350: William de Retford (later made Baron of the Exchequer in 1354)
- 1350–1353: John Buckingham (later Bishop of Lincoln)
- 1353–1353: Robert Wingerworth
- 1353–1358: William Dalton
- 1359–1361: John Newbury
- 1361–1371: Henry Snaith
- 1371–1376: John Sleaford
- 1376–1377: Walter Ralphs
- 1377–1390: Alan Stokes
- 1390–1398: Richard Clifford (later Bishop of London)
- 1398–1399: John de Macclesfield
- 1399–1408: William Livened, Esq.
- 1408–1412: Richard Clifford junior
- 1412: Thomas Ringwood (later made High Sheriff of Wiltshire in 1419)
- 1413–1417: John Spencer
- 1418–1444: Robert Rolleston
- 1444–1446: Sir John Norreys
- 1446–1450: Sir Thomas Tuddenham
- 1450–1453: William Cotton
- 1453–1457: Henry Fillongley
- c1458–1460 John Wood
- 1460: Thomas Vaughan
- 1461–1465: Sir George Darell
- 1466–70: Robert Cousin
- 1470–1471: Sir John Plummer
- 1471–1476: Robert Cousin
- 1476–1478: Sir John Say
- 1478–1483: Peter Curtys
- 1483–1485: Robert Appulby
- 1485–1486: Sir Hugh Conway
- 1486–1487: Alfred Cornburgh
- 1487–1492: Peter Curtys
- 1492–1504: Sir Robert Lytton
- 1504–1543: Sir Andrew Windsor
- 1543–1553: Sir Ralph Sadler
- 1553–1559: Sir Edward Waldegrave
- 1559–?1603: John Fortescue of Salden
- 1603–1611: George Home, 1st Earl of Dunbar
- 1603?–1612: Sir Roger Aston
- 1613–1618: James Hay, 1st Earl of Carlisle
- 1618: Lionel Cranfield, 1st Earl of Middlesex
- 1619–1622: William Feilding, 1st Earl of Denbigh
- 1626–1655: William Legge
- 1660: Sir Edward Montagu
- 1671: Sir Ralph Montagu
- 1685: Richard Graham, 1st Viscount Preston
- 1689: Ralph Montagu, 1st Duke of Montagu
- 1709: John Montagu, 2nd Duke of Montagu
- 1749–1754: Sir Thomas Robinson
- 1754: William Barrington, 2nd Viscount Barrington
- 1755–1760: Sir Thomas Robinson
- 1760: Granville Leveson-Gower, 2nd Earl Gower
- 1763: Francis Dashwood, 11th Baron le Despencer
- 1765: John Ashburnham, 2nd Earl of Ashburnham
- 1775–1782: Thomas Pelham, 2nd Baron Pelham of Stanmer

The post was abolished with the other offices of the Great Wardrobe in 1782; his duties were transferred to the Lord Chamberlain.

==== Deputy Masters of the Great Wardrobe ====
The Deputy Master of the Great Wardrobe was a position in the British Royal Household, the chief subordinate to the Master of the Great Wardrobe. Holders enjoyed a salary of £200 (fixed in 1674), reduced to £150 in 1761. The post seems to have developed into a sinecure, and by 1765, the office of Assistant to the Deputy Master had become established.

- 1660: Thomas Townshend
- 1680: Robert Nott
- 1685: Thomas Robson
- 1689: Robert Nott
- 1695: Charles Bland
- bef. 1707: Thomas Dummer
- 1750: William Robinson
- 1754: Daines Barrington
- 1756: Sir William Robinson, 4th Baronet
- 1760: Thomas Gilbert
- 1763: Paul Whitehead
- 1765–1782: William Ashburnham

The post was abolished with the other offices of the Great Wardrobe in 1782.

=== Others ===
==== Keepers of the Privy Wardrobe ====
In July 1323, John Fleet was appointed 'Keeper of the part of the King's Wardrobe in the Tower of London'. This, apparently the first such appointment, marked a key stage in the development of the Privy Wardrobe there into a repository and manufactory of arms, armour and artillery.

- 1323–1344 John Fleet (afterwards Warden of the Mint)
- 1344–1351 Robert Mildenhall
- 1351–1360 William Rothwell
- 1360–1365 Henry Snaith (also Keeper of the Great Wardrobe from 1361)
- 1365–1377 John Sleaford (also Keeper of the Great Wardrobe from 1371)
- 1378–1381 John Hatfield
- 1381–1382 John Hermesthorpe
- 1382–1395 Randolph Hatton
- 1396–1399 John Lowick
- 1399–1405 John Norbury
- 1405–1407 Henry Somer
- 1407– Simon Fleet
- 1430– Gilbert Parr
- 1457– Thomas Thorp
- 1460– John Parr
- 1461– John Sidborough
- 1476– Robert Allerton

No further appointments were made to this office after 1476.

==== Keepers of local Wardrobes ====
- 15??: Thomas Maynman (Keeper of the Wardrobe at East Greenwich)
- 1515: John Patey (Keeper of the Wardrobe at Richmond)
- 1533–1557: John Rede (Keeper of the Wardrobe at Westminster)
- 1563: Sir Hugh Underhill (Keeper of the Wardrobe at East Greenwich)
- 1625: Theobald Pears (Keeper of the Wardrobe at Richmond, after his father Stephen Pears).

== See also ==
- Cabinet of the United Kingdom
- Richard of Pudlicott, burgled the king's wardrobe in 1303.
