= Hugh Underhill =

16th-century Keeper of the Wardrobe

Keeper of the Wardrobe
- In office 6 February 1563 – 1593
- Monarch: Elizabeth I

Personal details
- Born: 1518 Hunningham, Warwickshire, England
- Died: 1593 (aged 74–75) Greenwich, Kent, England
- Spouse: Katherine Manning (m. 1572)

Sir Hugh Underhill (1518–1593) served as Keeper of the Wardrobe under Queen Elizabeth I and was highly regarded among members of the Royal Household.

== Biography ==
=== Early life ===
Sir Hugh Underhill was born the son of Thomas Underhill (1485–1520) and Anne Wynter (1485–1545) about 1518 in Hunningham, Warwickshire, England. In 1540, he married a daughter of Thomas Maynman, the Keeper of the Wardrobe. They had a son, Thomas Underhill, who was born 1545 at Greenwich, London, England.

In 1572, Sir Hugh Underhill married his second wife, Katherine Manning, in Downe, Kent, England. Their son George Underhill (1573–1625) was born in 1573 at Warwickshire, England.

=== Hugh Underhill Under Queen Elizabeth I ===
Hugh Underhill was appointed by Queen Elizabeth the Keeper of the Wardrobe at the King's Manor at Greenwich on 6 February 1563. He was later elevated to be responsible for the Wardrobe of Beds.

The Queen held Hugh in high regard. The royal warrant appointing him to the wardrobe job read:

In consideration of the true and faithful service heretofore done unto us by our well beloved servant Hugh Underhill, one of the officers of our wardrobe of beds, we have given and by these presents grant unto Hugh Underhill the office of keeper of our wardrobe within our manor of Greenwich.

This position was one of the highest, maintaining the countless hangings of tapestry, the Cloths of State, the great carpets, and all upholstering of chairs, stools, curtains, and bedsteads. In 1590, he and his wife were granted lifetime appointments by the Queen as Keeper of the Garden in the manor of East Greenwich, as here "Well beloved subjects."

Hugh Underhill died 1593 in Greenwich, Kent, England, at the age of 75 leaving a will dated 1 January 1593.

== Famous Descendants ==
Thomas Underhill (1545–1591), son of Hugh Underhill, served as Keeper of the Wardrobe of Kenilworth Castle and had charge of its contents after the castle was given by Queen Elizabeth I to her favourite Robert Dudley, 1st Earl of Leicester in 1563.

Sir John Underhill (1574–1608), grandson of Hugh Underhill and son of Thomas Underhill, despite being born in England would be among Puritan exiles who left for Bergen op Zoom, The Netherlands, where he died and was buried.

Captain John Underhill, great-grandson of Hugh Underhill, would emigrate from England to The Netherlands with his family, and then from The Netherlands to the Massachusetts Bay Colony where he became a leading figure in Colonial America.

Myron Charles Taylor, America's leading industrialist, and a key diplomatic figure at the hub of many of the most important geopolitical events before, during, and after World War II. Also eighth generation descended from Captain John Underhill.

Amelia Earhart, American aviation pioneer and author famous for her mysterious disappearance.

== Sources ==
- Bulletin of the Underhill Society of America Education and Publishing Fund, 1967
- Boyer, Carl, Ancestral Lines: 144 Families in England, Germany, New England, New York, New Jersey and Pennsylvania, 1975
