= Gertrudiskerk =

Church in Bergen op Zoom, the Netherlands

Coordinates: 51°29′40″N 4°17′17″E

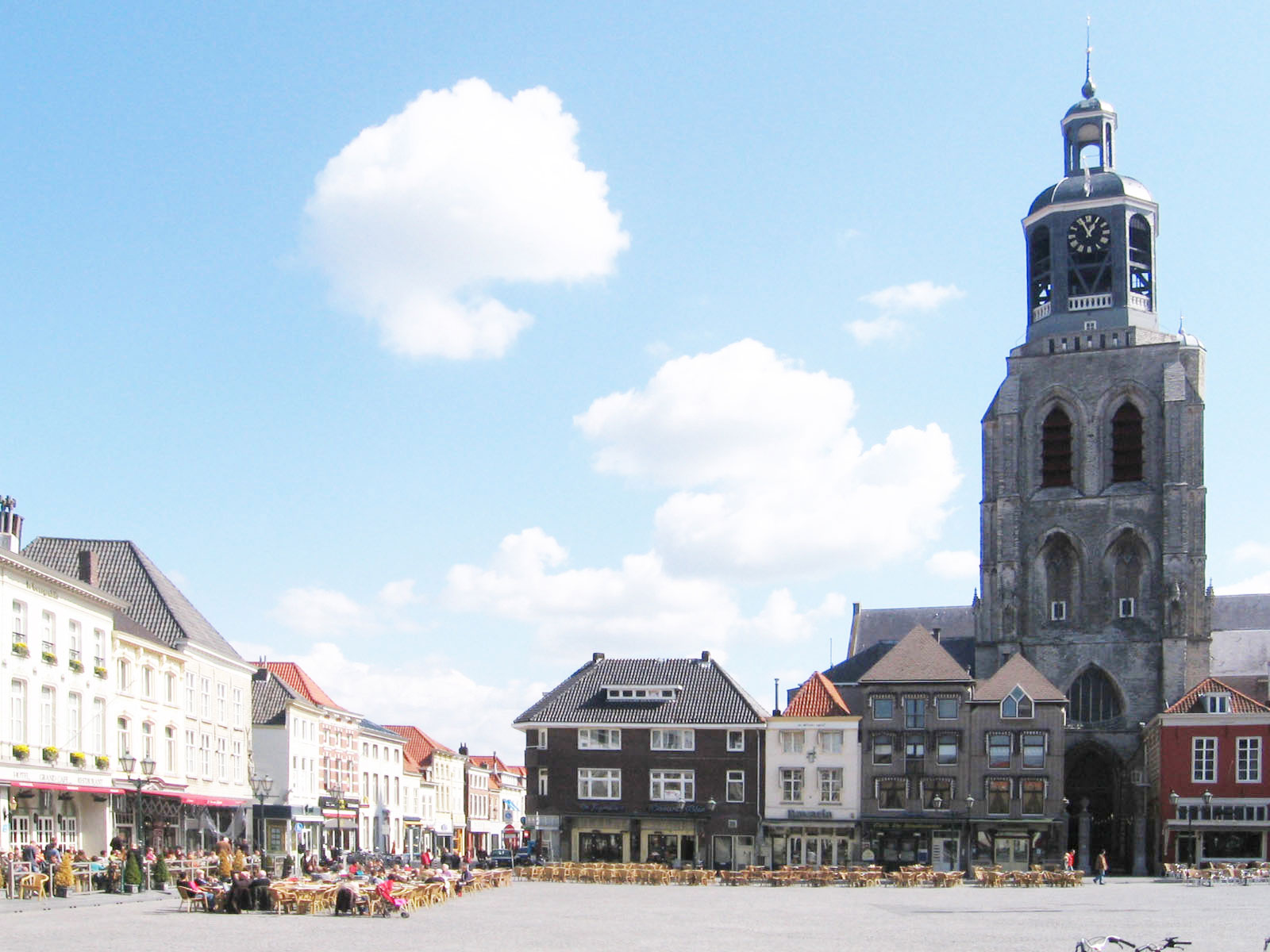
Gertrudiskerk in Bergen op Zoom

The Gertrudiskerk is a church approachable from the large market in the center of Bergen op Zoom, Netherlands. The towers of the church are called "pepper plant towers". An old legend says Saint Gertrude of Nivelles, abbess of the abbey in Nivelles, founded the church in 654.

The older part of the church consisting of the towers, dates to around 1370. These were later incorporated in probably the fourteenth and fifteenth century when changes were made to the church. The building at that time was used for Catholic worship services. The current church building, completed in 1477 was designed by Evert Spoorwater. He devised a new chancel with chancel ambulatory and vaults in the ship style of the Brabantine Gothic.

== History ==
In 1489 Anthonis submitted to Keldermans a design for a new church in the Late Gothic style. In spite of a constant lack of money, a new chancel and transept were realized. During the troubles of 1580 the church was plundered and thereafter used as a military warehouse. A cannonade by the French in 1747 left the church devastated. In 1750 rebuilding efforts started again, albeit with a more sober character. The church was 9 meters lower after being rebuilt.

In 1586 the church was arranged for reformed services. The new chancel and transept were completed and in 1698 were demolished. Thus only a small part remained of the second transept. Material was needed at this time for the construction of fortifications.

From 1586 to 1966 the reformed congregation had this building in possession. In 1747 the building burned down after the bombardment by the French. Rebuilding took place using Protestant funds and Protestant stones. The reformed congregation retained control through the 1950s and 1960s and people began to regret that more and more. It appeared an impossible task to maintain such a large building. In 1966 the church was transferred to the municipality so the government could restore the building.

New misfortune struck the church again in 1972 when a fire broke out. The whole interior including the 18th century pipe organ by Louis Delhaye II was lost. In the 1980s restoration started anew. The arrangement that followed would be that the municipality would keep the building and property in good maintenance, and the two Catholic parishes in the city center would merge to become the Sint Gertrudiskerk. The congregation would pay for heating the church and the municipality would receive a limited use charge.

The large advantage of this agreement was that the empty restored church in time could be equipped with religious furnishings. Estimated cost for the restoration was €1,000,000. In 1987, the church was again inaugurated by the bishop of Breda, Msgr. H. Ernst.

== Interior ==
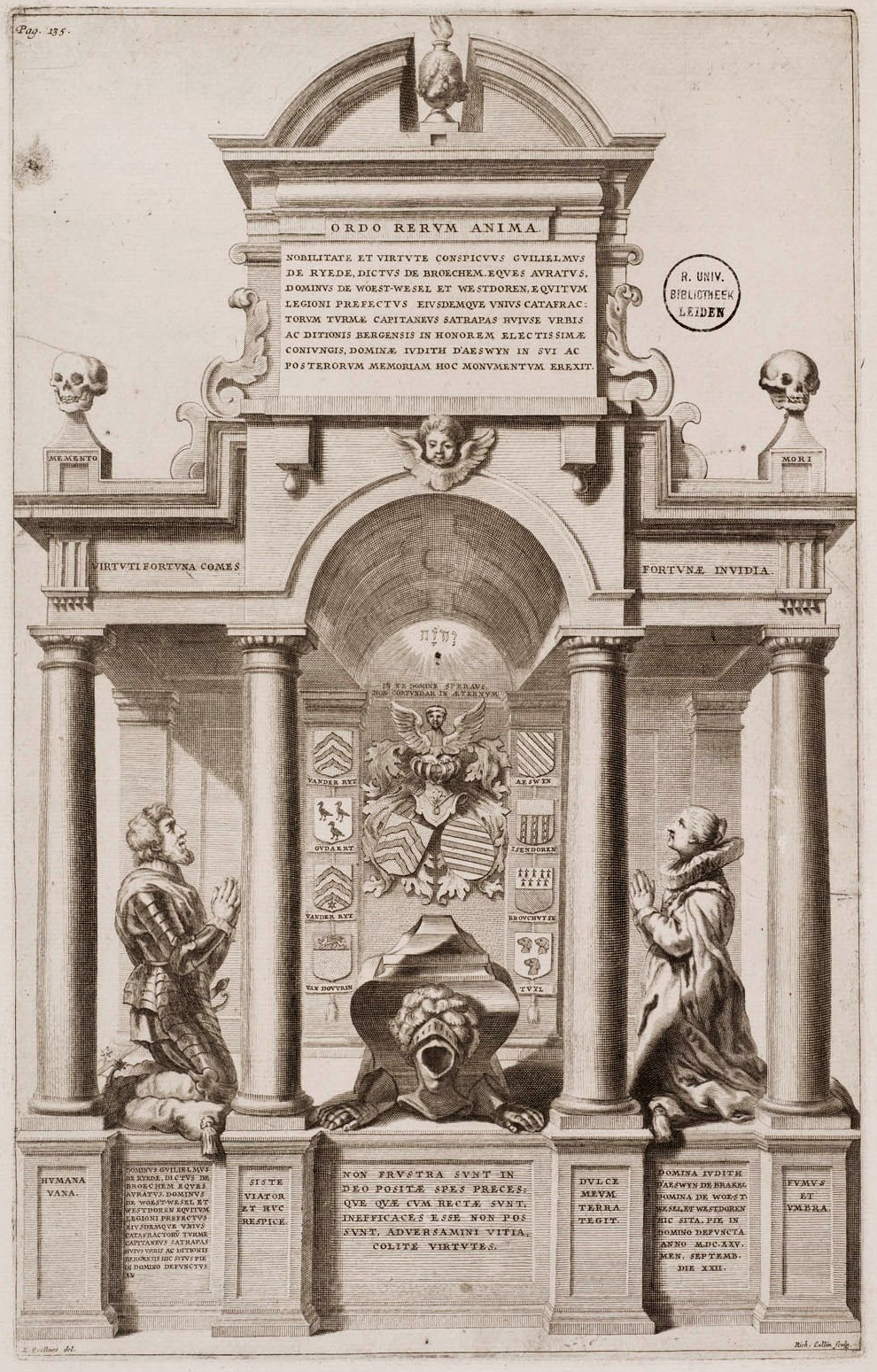
Engraving by Richard Collin after a design by Erasmus Quellinus II of the Tomb of Willem van der Rijt and Judith van Aeswyn, 1641

Among the interior features are a stained glass window honoring Saint Gertrudis, two pulpits, three Flemish confessionals and an Ibach pipe organ from 1863. Also some sepulchral monuments and several ecclesiastical objects are on display.

== Present ==
In the second half of the 20th century the church was returned to the Catholic community and it is now a parish church. The church is also used for ecumenical ceremonies and special religious celebrations. Larger and smaller concerts are both being held here, thanks to the excellent acoustics. During performances the seating is turned away from the altar towards a special concert podium and the Ibach organ.
