= Robert Wodehouse =

English administrator

Robert Wodehouse (died 1346) was a medieval English administrator.

He was probably born of common stock in Norwell Woodhouse, Nottinghamshire and found employment as a clerk in the office of the privy seal. In a forty-year career he held a succession of offices. He was cofferer and comptroller of the wardrobe (1309–1318), before being promoted a baron of the exchequer (until 1323). After another brief spell as comptroller (and Keeper of the Privy Seal) he was appointed in 1323 keeper of the wardrobe (until 1328).

He was then Treasurer (1329-1330), Chancellor of the Exchequer (1330–1331) and Treasurer again in 1338. In December 1338 he was dismissed by Edward III for unsatisfactory service, bringing his government career to an end. However, during his long career he had been well rewarded with a number of church benefices and in 1328 being appointed Archdeacon of Richmond, Yorkshire.

He died, probably at Stamford, early in 1346 and was buried in the choir of the church of the Augustinian friary in Stamford.
