= Vatican City during World War II =

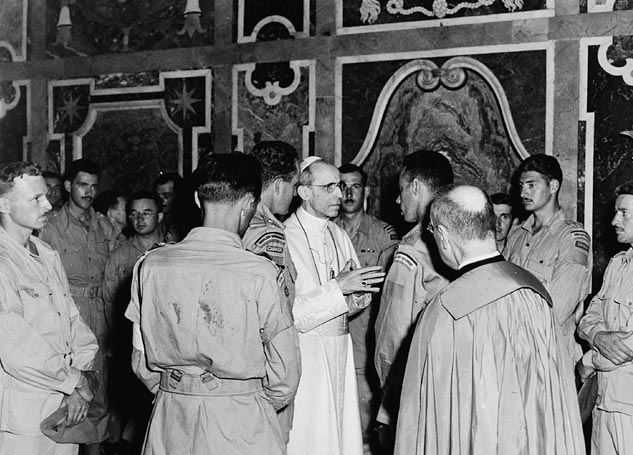
Members of the Canadian Royal 22nd Regiment in audience with Pope Pius XII, following the 1944 Liberation of Rome.

Vatican City under the leadership of Pope Pius XII opted to pursue a policy of neutrality during World War II. Although the city of Rome was occupied by Nazi Germany from September 1943 and the Allies from June 1944, Vatican City itself was not. The actions of Pius and the rest of the Vatican leadership during the war have been closely scrutinized and criticized. Pius's supporters state that Pius employed diplomacy to aid victims of the Nazis and directed his Church to provide discreet aid to Jews and others, thereby saving thousands of lives. Critics, by contrast, have asserted that the Italian Church the Vatican oversaw was overtly pro-Fascist and that Pius's response to the Holocaust and other Axis atrocities was characterized primarily by inaction and silence.

== Background ==
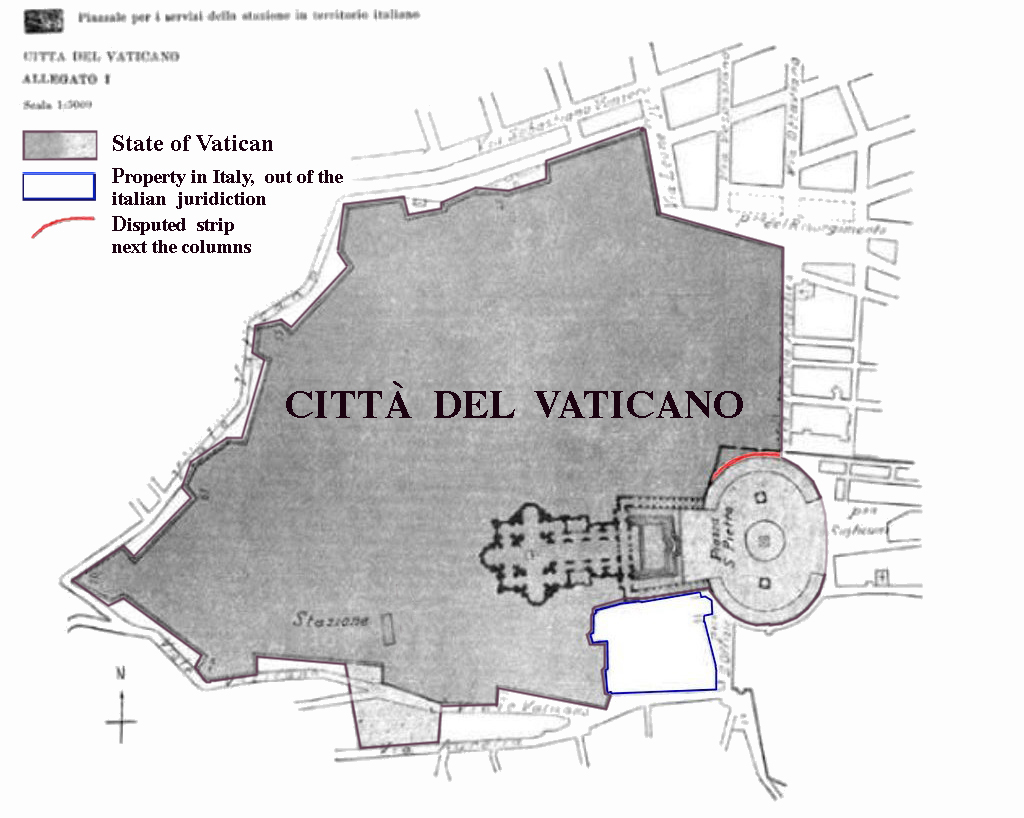
The Vatican City came into existence in 1929, a decade before the start of World War II

The Lateran Treaty of 1929 with Italy recognized the sovereignty of Vatican City. It declared Vatican City a neutral country in international relations, and required the Pope to abstain from mediation unless requested by all parties. In 1939, the city state was recognized by thirty-eight nations, with a diplomatic corps of thirteen full ambassadors and twenty-five ministers.

== Foreign relations ==
=== Pre-war mediation attempts ===
As early as April 1939, Pius XII announced a plan for peace, hoping to mediate a negotiation between the major European powers on the brink of war. The first leader contacted was Benito Mussolini, via Pius XII's usual go-between, Jesuit Father Tacchi Venturi. With Mussolini's approval, the next day Cardinal Secretary of State Luigi Maglione contacted the nuncios in Paris (Valerio Valeri), Warsaw (Filippo Cortesi), and Berlin (Cesare Orsenigo) and the Apostolic Delegate in London (William Godfrey). The proposed Vatican meeting accomplished very little of substance: if there was any coherent position espoused by the Vatican among its various communications, it was appeasement. In particular, the Pope attempted to get Poland to accept the secession of the Free City of Danzig to Nazi Germany, a position Polish ambassador Kazimierz Papée (the former High Commissioner of Danzig) and the Polish government could not accept.

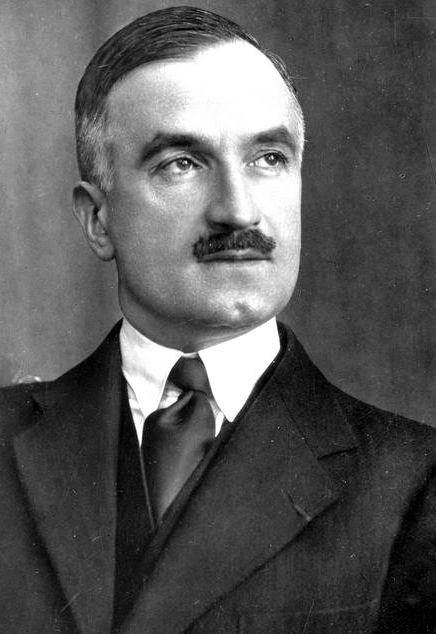
Polish ambassador to the Vatican, Kazimierz Papée, was critical of Pius XII's pre-war mediation efforts.

In his 24 August 1939 radio message, just a week before war, Pius warned: "The danger is imminent, but there is still time. Nothing is lost with peace; all can be lost with war!"

British historian Owen Chadwick drew four themes from the Vatican mediation attempts: a particular closeness to Mussolini, to the point of sending correspondence of his drafting, from the period May–August 1939; British and Polish disinterest in Vatican proposals, which were suspected of being pro-Italian and pro-German, respectively; major European powers viewed the Pope as "no minor pawn upon their chessboard"; and, above all, Pius XII wanted to ensure compromise between the Western powers to prevent Soviet territorial gains.

With Poland overrun, but France and the Low Countries yet to be attacked, Pius continued to hope for a negotiated peace to prevent the spread of the conflict. The similarly minded US President Franklin D. Roosevelt re-established unofficial American relations with the Vatican after a seventy-year hiatus and dispatched Myron C. Taylor as his personal representative. Despite the early collapse of peace hopes, the Taylor mission continued at the Vatican.

=== Public statements ===
Pius XII was resolved not to issue any public pronouncement that took sides in the conflict; this first manifested itself in a refusal to explicitly condemn the German invasion of Poland. Early on, Pius XII believed that the "rapid destruction of Poland meant the end of the war".

=== Summi pontificatus ===
==== Outbreak of war ====
Summi Pontificatus ("On the Limitations of the Authority of the State"), issued 20 October 1939, was the first papal encyclical issued by Pius XII, and established some of the patterns of his papacy. According to Chadwick, Summi Pontificatus exemplified both "the hesitancy and the care" of the pontiff. While the letter was being drafted, the Second World War began after the invasion of Catholic Poland. In the lengthy document - over 10,250 words in the original Latin - Pius included passages interpreted by some as endorsing Catholic resistance and as criticizing the war, racism, antisemitism, the invasion of Poland and the persecutions of the Church. With Italy not yet an ally of Germany in the war, Italians were called upon to remain faithful to the Church. Pius avoided naming the belligerent leaders Adolf Hitler and Joseph Stalin as the evildoers, establishing the "impartial" public tone that was to be a hallmark of his pontificate: "A full statement of the doctrinal stand to be taken in face of the errors of today, if necessary, can be put off to another time unless there is disturbance by calamitous external events; for the moment We limit Ourselves to some fundamental observations." The Vatican's newspaper L'Osservatore Romano underscored the favorable response to the encyclical in Germany, quoting extensively from Deutsche Allgemeine Zeitung's approving review.

==== "Anti-Christian movements" ====
The Pope wrote of "anti-Christian movements" bringing forth a crop of "poignant disasters" and called for love, mercy, and compassion against the "deluge of discord". Following themes addressed in Non abbiamo bisogno (1931); Mit brennender Sorge (1937) and Divini redemptoris (1937), Pius wrote of a need to bring back to the Church those who were following "a false standard... misled by error, passion, temptation and prejudice, [who] have strayed away from faith in the true God". He wrote of "Christians unfortunately more in name than in fact" having shown "cowardice" in the face of persecution by these creeds:

Who among "the Soldiers of Christ" – ecclesiastic or layman – does not feel himself incited and spurred on to a greater vigilance, to a more determined resistance, by the sight of the ever-increasing host of Christ's enemies; as he perceives the spokesmen of these tendencies deny or in practice neglect the vivifying truths and the values inherent in belief in God and in Christ; as he perceives them wantonly break the Tables of God's Commandments to substitute other tables and other standards stripped of the ethical content of the Revelation on Sinai, standards in which the spirit of the Sermon on the Mount and of the Cross has no place?

— Summi Pontificatus 7 – Pope Pius XII, Oct. 1939

==== Invasion of Poland ====
Pius wrote of a persecuted Church of a time requiring "charity" for victims who had a "right" to compassion, and of the suffering of the Poles:

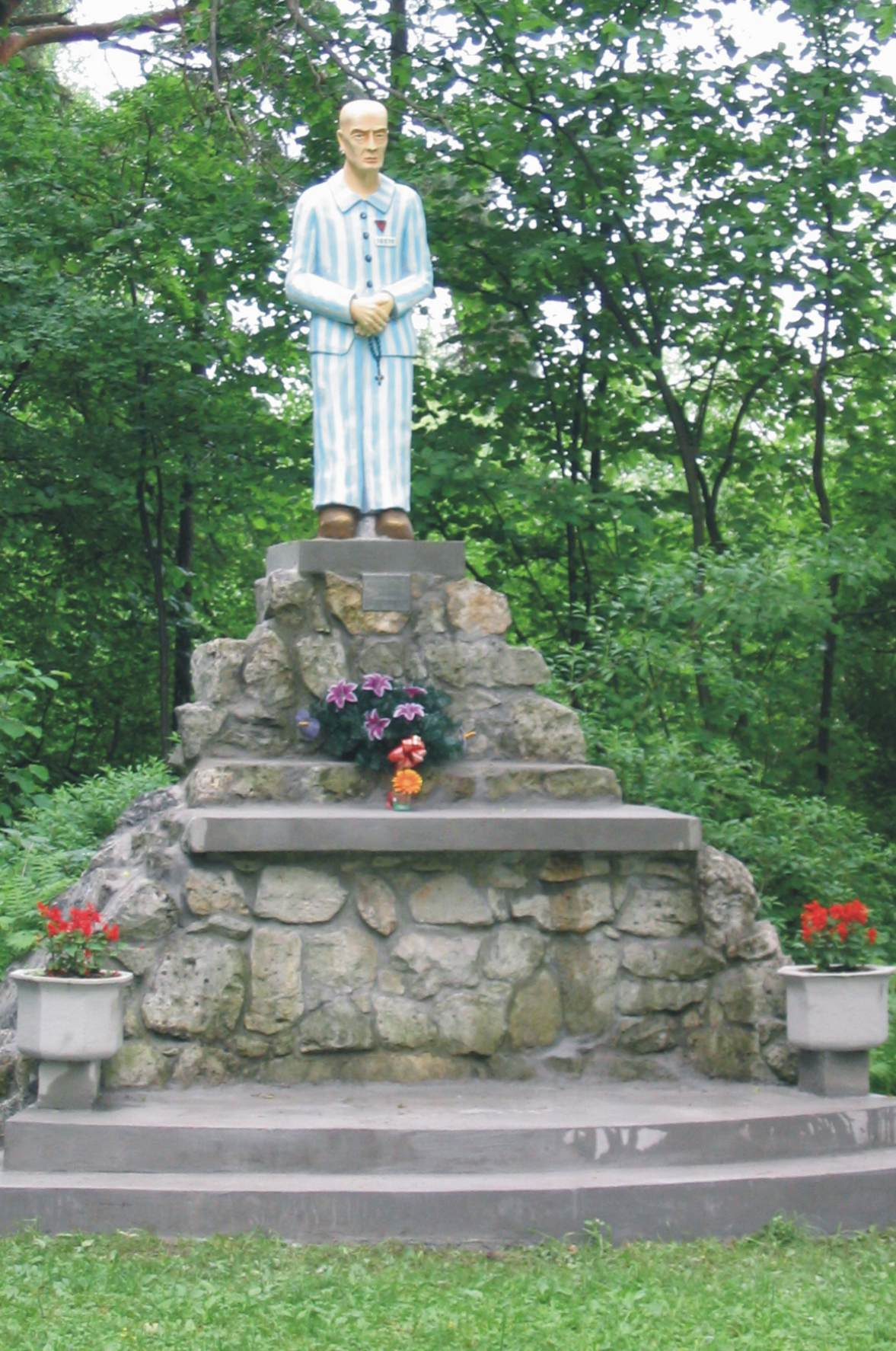
A monument to Fr. Maximilian Kolbe, among the estimated 3,000 members (18%) of the Polish clergy who were killed by the Nazis; of these, 1,992 died in concentration camps.

The blood of countless human beings, even noncombatants, raises a piteous dirge over a nation such as Our dear Poland, which, for its fidelity to the Church, for its services in the defense of Christian civilization, written in indelible characters in the annals of history, has a right to the generous and brotherly sympathy of the whole world, while it awaits, relying on the powerful intercession of Mary, Help of Christians, the hour of a resurrection in harmony with the principles of justice and true peace.

— Summi Pontificatus 106 – Pope Pius XII, Oct. 1939

==== Plan to increase "native" clergy; quotation of Biblical passage extolling vision where "there is neither Gentile or Jew" ====
About midway through the encyclical, Pius wrote:

In accordance with these principles of equality, the Church devotes her care to forming cultured native clergy and gradually increasing the number of native Bishops. And in order to give external expression to these, Our intentions, We have chosen the forthcoming Feast of Christ the King to raise to the Episcopal dignity at the Tomb of the Apostles twelve representatives of widely different peoples and races. In the midst of the disruptive contrasts which divide the human family, may this solemn act proclaim to all Our sons, scattered over the world, that the spirit, the teaching and the work of the Church can never be other than that which the Apostle of the Gentiles preached: "putting on the new (man), him who is renewed unto knowledge, according to the image of him that created him. Where there is neither Gentile nor Jew, circumcision nor uncircumcision, barbarian nor Scythian, bond nor free. But Christ is all and in all" (Colossians iii. 10, 11).

— Summi Pontificatus 48 – Pope Pius XII, Oct. 1939.

=== 1940 meeting with Ribbentrop ===
In March 1940, the Nazi Foreign Minister Joachim von Ribbentrop met with Pius. When Ribbentrop asked the Pope why he had sided with the Allies, Pius replied with a list of recent Nazi atrocities and religious persecutions committed against Christians and Jews, in Germany and in Poland. This led The New York Times to headline its report "Jews Rights Defended" and write of the "burning words he spoke to Herr Ribbentrop about religious persecution".

=== 1942 Christmas message ===
In 1942, Pius delivered a Christmas message over Vatican Radio, which voiced concern for the victims of the Nazis' genocidal policies. From May 1942, the Nazis had commenced their industrialized slaughter of the Jews of Europe – the Final Solution. Romani people and others were also marked for extermination. The Pope addressed the racial persecutions in the following terms:

Mankind owes that vow to the numberless exiles whom the hurricane of war has torn from their native land and scattered in the land of the stranger; who can make their own the lament of the Prophet: 'Our inheritance is turned to aliens; our house to strangers.' Mankind owes that vow to the hundreds of thousands of persons who, without any fault on their part, sometimes only because of their nationality or race, have been consigned to death or slow extermination."

— Pius XII – Christmas Radio Address, 1942

The New York Times called Pius "a lonely voice crying out of the silence of a continent."

The speech was made in the context of the near total domination of Europe by the armies of Nazi Germany, although the war had turned in favour of the Allies on all fronts. According to the Encyclopædia Britannica, Pius refused to say more "fearing that public papal denunciations might provoke the Hitler regime to brutalize further those subject to Nazi terror – as it had when Dutch bishops publicly protested earlier in the year – while jeopardizing the future of the church".

=== Contacts to the German military opposition ===
Pope Pius XII addressing the crowd from St. Peter's Basilica after the liberation of Rome

In the winter of 1939/40, the Bavarian lawyer and reserve 'Abwehr' officer Josef Müller, acting as an emissary for the early German military opposition against Hitler then centered around General Franz Halder, the chief of staff of the German army, contacted Monsignore Ludwig Kaas, the exiled leader of the German Catholic Zentrum party, in Rome, hoping to use the Pope as an intermediary to contact the British. Kaas put Müller in contact with Father Robert Leiber, who personally asked the Pope to relay the information about the German resistance to the British. After more than a day of "quiet reflection", Pius XII agreed to pass the information along to the British. However he refused to pass the information along to the French or even to his own Secretariat of State.

The Pope's Private Secretary, Robert Leiber, met with Müller, who visited Rome in 1939 and 1940. The Vatican considered Müller to be a representative of Colonel-General Beck and agreed to offer the machinery for mediation. Oster, Wilhelm Canaris and Hans von Dohnányi, backed by Beck, told Müller to ask Pius to ascertain whether the British would enter negotiations with the German opposition which wanted to overthrow Hitler. The British agreed to negotiate, provided the Vatican could vouch for the opposition's representative. Pius, communicating with British envoy D'Arcy Osborne, channelled communications back and forth in secrecy. The Vatican agreed to send a letter outlining the bases for peace with Britain, and the participation of the Pope was used to try to persuade senior German Generals Halder and Brauchitsch to act against Hitler.

Negotiations were tense, with a Western offensive expected, and on the basis that substantive negotiations could only follow the replacement of the Hitler regime. Hoffmann wrote that, when the Venlo Incident stalled the talks, the British agreed to resume discussions primarily because of the "efforts of the Pope and the respect in which he was held. Chamberlain and Halifax set great store by the Pope's readiness to mediate." Pius, without offering endorsement, advised Osbourne on 11 January 1940 that the German opposition had said that a German offensive was planned for February, but that this could be averted if the German generals could be assured of peace with Britain, and not on punitive terms. If this could be assured, then they were willing to move to replace Hitler. The Pope admitted to "discomfort" at his role as mediator, but advised that the Germans involved were not Nazis. The British government had doubts as to the capacity of the conspirators. On 7 February, the Pope updated Osbourne that the opposition wanted to replace the Nazi regime with a democratic federation, but hoped to retain Austria and the Sudetenland. The British government was non-committal, and said that while the federal model was of interest, the promises and sources of the opposition were too vague. Nevertheless, the resistance were encouraged by the talks, and Muller told Leiber that a coup would occur in February. Pius appeared to continue to hope for a coup in Germany into March 1940.

Chadwick wrote that Pius XII met with D'Arcy Osborne, telling him that he knew the names of the involved German generals but did not wish to share them. Pius XII insisted to Osborne that he was merely passing on a message and that "he did not wish in the slightest degree to endorse it or to recommend it". When Osborne pressed the Pope on the vagueness of his message, Osborne reported that Pius XII replied "perhaps, after all, it was not worth proceeding with the matter and he would therefore ask me to return his communication to me as not having been made". The Pope further declined Osborne's request to guarantee the good faith of the generals, or whether they could accomplish their goal. In a second meeting, Pius XII flashed a typed, four-page letter in German in front of Osborne, but declined to let him read it or have a copy.

After the German attack on Denmark and Norway, the British refused any further contacts with emissaries of the German military opposition, fearing another Venlo incident. The opposition largely dissolved after the German conquest of France in summer 1940 because Halder no longer dared to stand up against an apparently successful Hitler. It only regained momentum in 1944 when a new generation of younger officers decided to conspire against the ruthless Nazi regime. Leiber remained the point of contact at the Vatican for communications from Colonel-General Ludwig Beck in the lead up to the 1944 July Plot.

=== Mid-war ===
In late 1942, senior Italian officials first approached the Vatican with peace feelers. In the eyes of the Vatican, "the neutrality of the Vatican, achieved at such cost, was paying a dividend at last". When Mussolini sent his son-in-law, Count Ciano, as ambassador to the Vatican in 1943, the Germans and others speculated about the possibility of Ciano negotiating a separate peace. The British for their part doubted any such intentions and wanted nothing to do with Ciano.

== Military history ==
The Vatican maintained three small forces of troops known as the Swiss Guard, the Palatine Guard and the Noble Guard. During World War II the Vatican's Swiss guards and other two armed regiments obtained additional submachine guns and gas masks to supplement the existing Vatican arsenal in the event of an attack.

=== Extraterritorial status ===
With the German occupation of Rome in 1943, after the fall of Mussolini, came rumors of a plot to kidnap the Pope; modern scholars are still at odds over the authenticity of such allegations. The Vatican City itself was never occupied; in fact, the chief concern within the Vatican was the potential for lawlessness in the period between the German and Allied occupation, not the potential for German occupation. However the Vatican Police Force in conjunction with the Swiss Guard maintained order.

=== Bombing of Rome ===
One of Pius's main diplomatic priorities was to prevent the bombing of Rome; so sensitive was the pontiff that he protested even the British air dropping of pamphlets over Rome, claiming that the few landing within the city-state violated the Vatican's neutrality. Before the American entry into the war, there was little impetus for such a bombing, as the British saw little strategic value in it. After the American entry, the US opposed such a bombing, fearful of offending Catholic members of its military forces, while the British then supported it. Pius similarly advocated for the declaration of Rome as an "open city", but this occurred only on 14 August 1943, after Rome had already been bombed twice. Although the Italians consulted the Vatican on the wording of the open city declaration, the impetus for the change had little to do with the Vatican.

Vatican City was bombed twice during the war.

=== Prisoners of war ===
After the Italian surrender, Allied prisoners guarded by Italians were released, and many headed for Vatican City. The Vatican feared such an event would compromise its neutrality and gave strict instructions to the Swiss Guard to prevent any such person from entering the city state; a system of identity cards was instituted to prevent non-Vatican personnel from entering St. Peter's. Some Vatican officials, however, did act independently to assist such persons; the most famous example is Hugh O'Flaherty, whose exploits were made famous in the film The Scarlet and the Black.

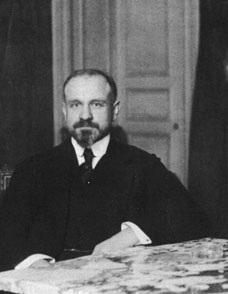
Bernardino Nogara, the chief Vatican financier during the war

== Media ==
=== Osservatore Romano ===
The Osservatore Romano, the Vatican's newspaper, published in Italian, was the only newspaper in Italy not censored by the Italian government. Despite its relatively moderate content, the paper was lionized by the British and French press and vilified by the Italian Fascist press. By 20 May 1940, the paper ceased publishing any articles about the war not authored by the "official Italian war communique", per an agreement with the Italian government. By August 1940 its weather reports were also eliminated when the Italian government protested that they might aid British aircraft.

=== Vatican Radio ===
Vatican Radio was in a similar situation; for example, it ceased news about prisoners-of-war, which the Italian government worried would hint at the location of ships. It also ceased reporting on the weather, for the same reason. After Cardinal August Hlond issued a fiery, Polish-language message to Poland over the radio (which could scarcely be picked up in Poland), "nothing like this broadcast was ever allowed to happen again". After German complaints, the radio ceased any discussion of the situation in Poland, and later ceased discussing the situation of the church in Germany. Pius XII spoke over the radio on several occasions, most notably during his 1942 Christmas address in which he voiced concern at the murder of "hundreds of thousands" of "faultless" people on the basis of no more than their "race or nationality".

=== Film ===
During the German occupation of Rome, two films, The Gates of Heaven by Vittorio de Sica and The Ten Commandments by Giorgio Walter Chili, were shot inside the Vatican City. The shooting was discreetly prolonged. This allowed the film workers an excuse to avoid moving to Venice to participate in the propaganda of the Republic of Salò. Several Jews and people persecuted by the Nazis were hired for the films. The filming and the sheltering of the refugees disturbed the Vatican residents.

== The Holocaust ==
In his 1939 Summi Pontificatus first papal encyclical, Pius XII expressed dismay at the invasion of Poland; reiterated Catholic teaching against racism and antisemitism; and endorsed resistance against those opposed to the ethical principles of the "Revelation on Sinai" and the Sermon on the Mount.

Pius protested the deportations of Slovak Jews to the Bratislava government from 1942. In 1943 he protested that "The Holy See would fail in its Divine Mandate if it did not deplore these measures, which gravely damage man in his natural right, mainly for the reason that these people belong to a certain race." In June 1942 Pius personally protested against the mass deportations of Jews from France, ordering the papal nuncio to protest to Marshal Philippe Pétain against "the inhuman arrests and deportations of Jews". In his 1942 Christmas address, Pius voiced concern at the murder of "hundreds of thousands" of "faultless" people because of their "nationality or race".

Following the Nazi occupation of Italy, the Pope ordered Rome's Catholic institutions to open themselves to the Jews, sheltering 4,715 of the 5,715 listed for deportation by the Nazis in 150 Catholic institutions. In the Vatican itself, 477 Jews were sheltered. As German round-ups continued in Northern Italy, the Pope opened his summer residence, Castel Gandolfo, to take in thousands of Jews, and authorized institutions across the north to do the same.

From 1943, Pius instructed his Bulgarian representative to take "all necessary steps" to support Bulgarian Jews facing deportation, and his Turkish nuncio, Angelo Roncalli (later Pope John XXIII) arranged for the transfer of thousands of children out of Bulgaria to Palestine. Roncalli also advised the Pope of Jewish concentration camps in Romanian-occupied Transnistria. The Pope protested to the Romanian government and authorized for funds to be sent to the camps. In 1944 Pius appealed directly to the Hungarian government to halt the deportation of the Jews of Hungary and his nuncio, Angelo Rotta, led a citywide rescue scheme in Budapest.

Upon his death, Pius was praised emphatically by Israel and world leaders for his wartime leadership. But his insistence on Vatican neutrality and failure to explicitly name the Nazis as the evildoers of the conflict became the foundation for later criticisms.

=== Hugh O'Flaherty: the Vatican Pimpernel ===
From his Vatican office, and in co-operation with Pius XII, Monsignor Hugh O'Flaherty, an Irishman, operated an escape operation for Jews and Allied escapees. In 2012, the Irish Independent newspaper credited him with having saved more than 6,500 people during the war.

From 1943, he began to offer shelter to Allied servicemen seeking sanctuary in the Vatican. Using fake documents and a clandestine communications network, O'Flaherty defied the Gestapo's war criminal commander of Rome, Herbert Kappler, and evaded capture through the German occupation of Rome. O'Flaherty's '"Rome Escape Line" hid British and American soldiers and Jews in safe houses around the city. Kappler had a white line drawn around the boundary of the Vatican and offered a bounty on O'Flaherty's head. O'Flaherty forgave Kappler after the war and became a regular visitor to his prison cell – eventually presiding at his conversion to Catholicism. O'Flaherty's story was dramatized in the 1983 film The Scarlet and the Black, and Ireland honors his work with the Hugh O'Flaherty International Humanitarian Award.

== Church organization ==
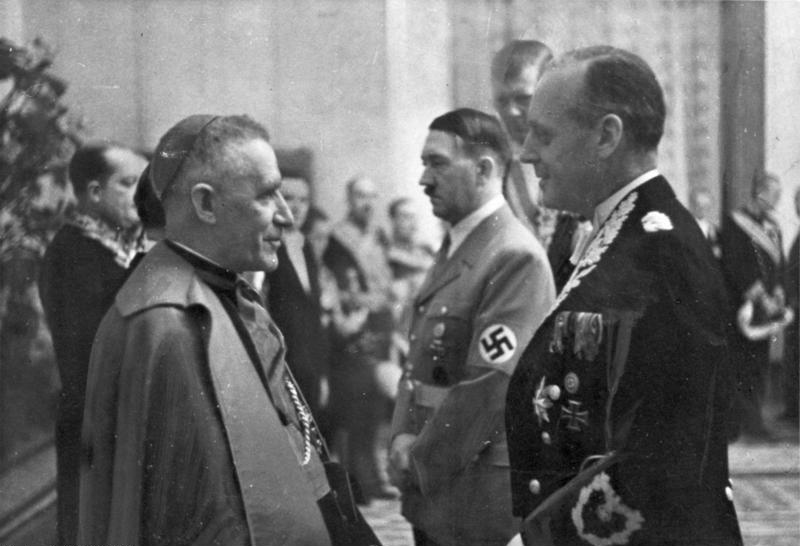
Cesare Orsenigo (left, with Hitler and Ribbentrop), nuncio to Germany, also served as de facto nuncio to Poland.

Occupying powers often requested that Pius XII reorganize conquered Catholic dioceses. Although such reorganization was generally refused, the decision of Pius XII to appoint German apostolic administrators to occupied Poland was "one of his most controversial decisions". These actions were the primary justification of the Polish Provisional Government for declaring the Concordat of 1925 null and void in 1945, an act that had tremendous consequences for post-war Polish-Vatican relations. There was no Apostolic Nuncio to Poland between 1947 and 1989, during the years of communist Poland.

== Immediate postwar aftermath ==
The Allies liberated Rome on 4–5 June 1944. During the liberation, many Catholic Allied troops visited the Vatican for Mass and to hear the Pope speak, including some who drove tanks into St. Peter's Square.

The Pope was the greatest celebrity on the Italian peninsula during this period, and, given the tarnish of the King of Italy with fascism, there was even talk of extending the temporal power of the papacy. The Pope granted audiences with Allied soldiers and leaders, which were prominently photographed.

Pius XII had refrained from creating cardinals during the war. By the end of World War II there were several prominent vacancies, including Cardinal Secretary of State, Camerlengo, Chancellor, and Prefect for the Congregation for the Religious. Pius XII created 32 cardinals in early 1946, having announced his intentions to do so in his preceding Christmas message.

== See also ==
- Index of Vatican City-related articles
- Neutral powers during World War II
- Pius Wars
