= Foreign relations of Pope Pius XII =

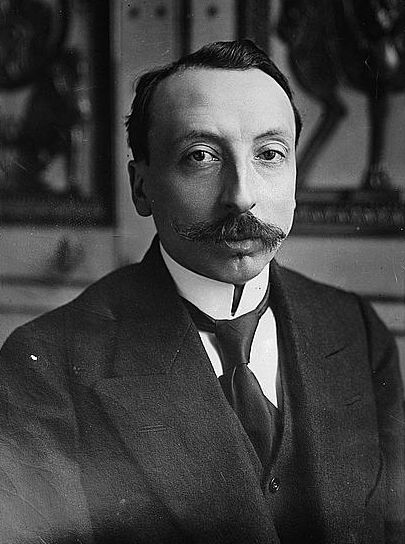
Léon Bérard, ambassador from Vichy France

Foreign relations of Pope Pius XII extended to most of Europe and a few states outside Europe. Pius XII was pope from 1939 to 1958, during World War II and the beginning of the Cold War.

== Background ==
Between the loss of the Papal States in 1870 and the signing of the Lateran Treaty in 1929, the diplomatic recognition of the papacy had actually increased, with eighteen accredited members of the Vatican diplomatic corps in 1890, fourteen in 1914, and twenty-four in 1921. This did not represent international support for the papal position in the Roman Question, however, as these nations also recognized the unified Kingdom of Italy, whose diplomatic corps in Rome developed over a similar trajectory.

In 1936 (three years before Pius XII became pope), there were thirty-four ambassadors, ministers, or chargé d'affaires to the Holy See. However, several of these diplomats spent much of their time in other European capitals—either for personal reasons or because they served multiple embassies (Argentina, Estonian, Latvia, Liberia, Peru, and El Salvador), were merely sinecures (Belgium), or were unpaid (Honduras). Others represented microstates that "hardly counted" (Monaco, San Marino, and the Order of Malta). The Spanish ambassador was driven out by a "tragi-comic siege" in the Piazza di Spagna. Nicaragua's ambassador was senile, and Panama's ambassador had not been seen since 1929.

In March 1939, Pius XII inherited thirty-eight diplomatic missions to the Vatican: thirteen at the "ambassadorial level", and the rest at the ministerial level; there were also papal representatives in thirty-eight countries, but the exchanges were not always mutual. At the time there were also twenty-three Vatican envoys without diplomatic status in their host state.

In contrast to the various sinecures, Diego von Bergen was a high-ranking member of the German diplomatic service, who twice turned down the office of Foreign Secretary to remain in Rome. According to Morley, "when Pius XII became Pope, there were papal nuncios in, among other capitals, Belgrade, Berlin, Berne, Brussels, Bucharest, Budapest, the Hague, Paris, Prague, Rome, and Warsaw. The circumstances of war reduced this number and changed the location and level of some of the diplomatic representatives. The end-result of these modifications was that during the years 1939-1943, the Secretariat of State was in diplomatic contact with its emissaries in Berlin, Rome, Vichy, Berne, Bratislava, Zagreb, Bucharest, and Budapest. In addition, active communications were maintained with the apostolic delegates in London, Washington, and Ankara".

== List of diplomats ==
A list of diplomats accredited to the Vatican published in December 1940 lists Diego von Bergen as the dean of the diplomatic corps, followed by thirteen Ambassadors and twenty three Ministers, with Myron Charles Taylor conspicuously in last place. "Nuncios" and "Ambassadors" were only exchanged between the Holy See and countries where the pope's representative ex officio was granted the title of dean of the diplomatic corps. In other countries, Pius XII was represented by an apostolic delegate or a chargé d'affaires, constituting a lower level of diplomatic recognition (representing the ecclesiastical hierarchy of a country, not the government). An apostolic delegate was neither accredited to a host government, nor required their approval.

A special 1948 Christmas Eve midnight Mass for diplomats celebrated by Pius XII was attended by 300 diplomatic personnel. In February 1949, there were thirty-nine accredited members of the Vatican diplomatic corps. A New Year's Day 1951 audience with the "entire diplomatic corps" included thirty-six accredited representatives, including eighteen full ambassadors, sixteen ministers, and two chargés d'affaires (China and Finland).

=== Nuncios ===
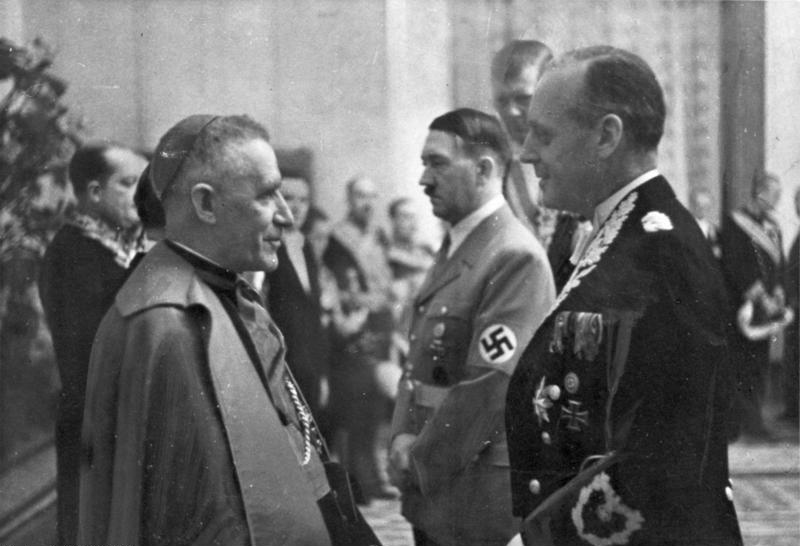
Cesare Orsenigo with Hitler and Joachim von Ribbentrop

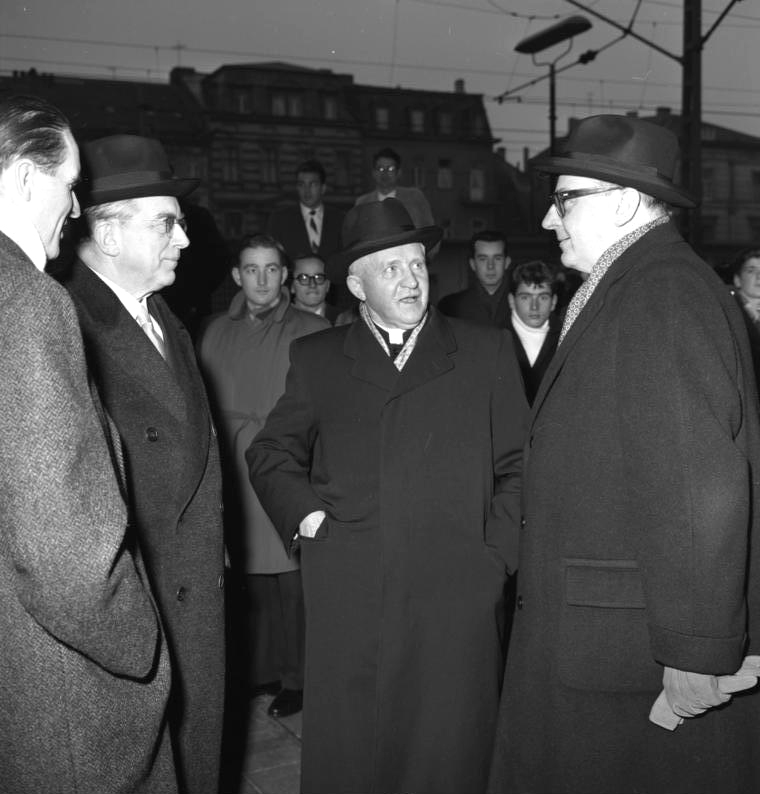
Aloisius Joseph Muench in postwar Germany

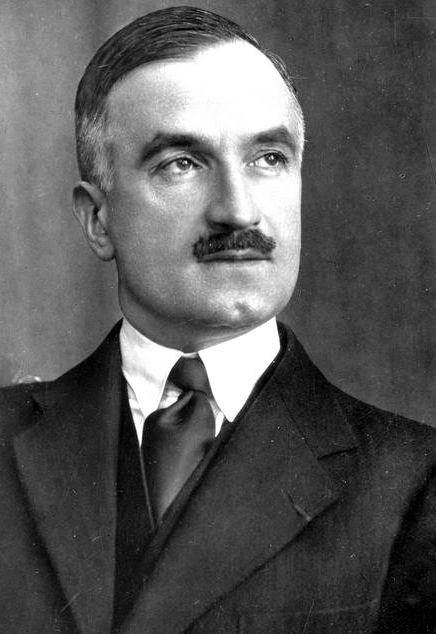
Kazimierz Papée, the Polish ambassador to the Vatican

Country	Nuncio	Nunciature	Ambassador	Rank
Argentina	Giuseppe Fietta (1936–1953); Mario Zanin (1953–1958)		Carlos Brebbia (1943–1947) (Note: Also Minister to Switzerland; appointed October 26, 1943.)	Ambassador
Austria	Maurilio Silvani (1946–1947); Giovanni Battista Dellepiane (1949–1961)	Apostolic Nuncio to Austria	Adolf Kohlruss (1946) (Note: Received on November 30, 1946. First ambassador since the Anschluss.)	Ambassador
Belgium	Clemente Micara (1923–1946); Fernando Cento (1946–1953); Efrem Forni (1953–1962)	Apostolic Nuncio to Belgium	Adrien Nieuwenhuys (Note: Reportedly fled Rome on June 16, 1940 for Switzerland with the Belgian ambassador to Italy, but decided to remain in Vatican on June 18.)	Ambassador
Bolivia	Giuseppe Burzio (1946–1950); Sergio Pignedoli (1950–1954); Umberto Mozzoni (1954–1958)			
Brazil	Benedetto Aloisi Masella (1927–1946); Carlo Chiarlo (1946–1954); Armando Lombardi (1954–1964)	Apostolic Nuncio to Brazil	Ildebrando Accioly; Mauricio Nabuco (ante 1948)	Ambassador
Chile	Aldo Laghi (1938–1942); Mario Zanin (1947–1953); Sebastiano Baggio (1953–1959)		(1939-?)	Ambassador
Colombia	Giuseppe Beltrami (1945–1950); Antonio Samoré (1950–1953); Paolo Bertoli (1953–1959)		Carlos Arango Velez (1944-post 1949) (Note: Elected Vice-President of Colombia in 1946. He did not originally resign his embassy, but later that year after controversy. He was dean of the diplomatic corps in 1949.)	Ambassador
Czechoslovakia	Sanverio "Xavier" Ritter (1946–1953)	Apostolic Nuncio to Czechoslovakia (Note: Internuncio to Czechoslovakia from May 11, 1946. Formerly, "nuncio to Prague before the German occupation of Czechoslovakia". Not accepted as nuncio after war because Czech government did not want him to become dean of the diplomatic corps.)	M. Maixner (circa 1947)	
Ecuador	Efrem Forni (1937–1953); Opilio Rossi (1953–1959)			
France	Valerio Valeri (1936–1944); Angelo Roncalli (1944–1953); Paolo Marella (1953–1959)	Apostolic Nuncio to France	François Charles-Roux (1932–1940); Wladimir d'Ormesson (1940) (Note: d'Ormesson replaced Charles-Roux on May 28, 1940—the same day other ambassadors were shuffled—when Philippe Pétain's Vichy regime came to power. Pius XII accepted his credentials on June 9, 1940.); Léon Bérard (1940–1945) (Note: Bérard replaced d'Ormesson on October 7, 1940. Bérard was accepted on November 22.); Jacques Maritain (1945–1948) (Note: Announced January 1945.)	Ambassador
Germany	Cesare Orsenigo (1930–1945); Aloisius Joseph Muench (1951–1959) (Note: Muench served as apostolic visitor from 1946.)	Apostolic Nuncio to Germany	Diego von Bergen (1915–1943); Ernst von Weizsäcker (1943–1945)	Ambassador
Hungary	Angelo Rotta (1930–1957) (Note: Previously an internuncio.)		György Barcza	Ambassador
Ireland	Paschal Charles Robinson (1929–1948); Ettore Felici (1949–1951); Gerald P. O'Hara (1951–1954); Albert Levame (1954–1958)	Apostolic Nuncio to Ireland		
Italy	Francesco Borgongini Duca (1929–1953); Giuseppe Fietta (1953–1958)	Apostolic Nuncio to Italy	Dino Alfieri (1939–1940) (Note: Jesuit Father Taochi Venturi served as "private envoy" to Mussolini.); Bernardo Attolico (1940–1943) (Note: Attolico succeeded Alfieri on May 29, 1940 in an unusually simple ceremony.); Galeazzo Ciano (1943) (Note: Mussolini's son-in-law, Ciano, replaced Attolico on February 7, 1943. After Germany recalled Diego von Bergen, Ciano's presentation of credentials was postponed indefinitely.)	Ambassador
Luxembourg	Clemente Micara (1923–1946); Fernando Cento (1946–1953); Efrem Forni (1953–1962)			
Netherlands	Paolo Giobbe (1935–1959)			
Paraguay	Liberato Tosti (1946–1948); Federico Lunardi (1949–1954); Luigi Punzolo (1954–1957); Carlo Martini (1958–1963)			
Peru	Fernando Cento (1936–1946); Giovanni Panico (1948–1953); Francesco Lardone (1953–1959)	Apostolic Nuncio to Peru	Diomedei Arias Schreider (Note: Arrested in September 1943 by Nazi troops in Milan but released after a protest by Pius XII.)	Ambassador
Poland	Filippo Cortesi (1936–1947) (Note: Cortesi was previously nuncio to Poland from 1921 to 1926. Cortesi fled Warsaw on September 5, 1939. He followed the Polish government-in-exile to Bucharest, but not Paris or London. Cesare Orsenigo, the nuncio to German, acted as de facto nuncio to Poland and had his authority officially extended on November 1. Alfredo Pacini was appointed as chargé d'affaires while the government-in-exile remained in Paris, and William Godfrey became the chargé d'affaires when the government-in-exile fled to London in 1940.)	Apostolic Nuncio to Poland	Kazimierz Papée (1939–1958) (Note: Appointed June 23, 1939 (post had been vacant since death of Vladislas Skryzinski in 1937. June 3, 1941 May 21, 1943 meetings with Pope was perceived as de facto recognition of the government-in-exile.)	Ambassador
Portugal	Pietro Ciriaci (1934–1954); Fernando Cento (1954–1958)	Apostolic Nuncio to Portugal	Carneiro Pacheco; Tovar de Lemos (?-1950); Jose Nasolini (1950-?)	Ambassador
Romania	Andrea Cassulo (1936–1947)		Nicolae Petrescu-Comnen (circa 1940); Daniel Papp (circa 1942); Basilio Grigorcea (circa 1944)	Ambassador
Spain	Gaetano Cicognani (1938–1953); Ildebrando Antoniutti (1953–1963)	Apostolic Nuncio to Spain	Viscount Santa Clara de Avedillo (circa 1940); Domingo de las Barcenas (circa 1943); Pablo de Churruca y Dotres (1946–1948) (Note: Appointed January 20, 1946.); Joaquin Ruiz Jimenez (1948-?)	Ambassador
Switzerland	Felipe Bernardini (1935–1953); Gustavo Testa (1953–1959)			
Uruguay	Albert Levame (1939–1949); Alfredo Pacini (1949–1960)			
Venezuela	Luigi Centoz (1936–1940); Giuseppe Misuraca (1941–1950); Armando Lombardi (1950–1954); Sergio Pignedoli (1954–1955); Raffaele Forni (1955–1960)		M. A. Pulido Mendez (?-1952)	Ambassador

=== Apostolic delegates ===
Country	Apostolic delegate	Minister	Rank
Albania	Leone Nigris (ante 1945) (Note: Denied entry into Albania in 1945 by partisans; represented thereafter by regent Franco Gjini)		
Bulgaria	Giuseppe Mazzoli (?-1946) (Note: Died in office in 1946. Replaced by a regent, Francesco Galloni, not another apostolic delegate.)		
Canada	Ildebrando Antoniutti (1938–1953); Giovanni Panico (1953–1959)		
China	Mario Zanin	C. K. Sie; John Ching Hsiung Wu	Envoy (Note: Also Minister to Switzerland. Appointed Vatican envoy in mid-1942 and left for Rome in January 1943.)
Cuba		Alfonso Forcade (1946-?)	Legate, then ambassador
Dominican Republic		Pedro Troncoso Sanchez (1949-?)	Ambassador
Egypt	Arthur Hughes (1945–1947 delegate; 1947–1949 internuncio)		
Greece	Angelo Roncalli (1935–1944)		
India		N. Raghavan	Ambassador
Japan	Paolo Marella (1933–1948) (Note: Given "full diplomatic privileges" in 1942 when Pius XII de facto recognized Japan.)	Ken Harada (1942–1945) (Note: Harada was announced in March and accepted by Pius XII on May 9, 1942. On June 7, 1944, Harada—whose residence was outside Vatican City—was restricted from moving within Rome other than on a direct route to his residence. Harada lost much of his clout in the Vatican after the Allied liberation of the Philippines in 1944.)	Ambassador
Korea, Republic of	Patrick James Byrne (1947-1949); Maximilien de Furstenberg (1950-1953); Thomas F. Quinlan (1953-1957); Egano Righi-Lambertini (1957-1960)		
Kenya	Antonio Riberi		
United Kingdom	William Godfrey (1938–1954) (Note: Also apostolic delegate to Gibraltar and Malta.); Gerald P. O'Hara (1954-?)	D'Arcy Osborne (1936–1947)	Envoy Extraordinary and Minister Plenipotentiary
United States	Amleto Giovanni Cicognani (1933–1958)	Myron Charles Taylor (1939–1950) (Note: Announced December 23, 1939 and confirmed February 28, 1940. Left Rome on September 22, 1941, flying to Lisbon and London on the way back to the US. Harold H. Tittmann Jr. remained as chargé d'affaires after Taylor's departure, and was required to move from Italy into Vatican City on December 13, 1941. Taylor arrived again in Rome in September 1942, but returned in October. Taylor resigned in January 1950, after which Truman recalled his assistant Franklin C. Gowan, prompting speculation that US-Vatican ties would end.)	"Peace Ambassador" and "personal envoy" (Note: Taylor was extended Ambassador status by the Holy See on February 13, 1940.)
Turkey	Angelo Roncalli (1933–1944)		
Yugoslavia	Regent Joseph Patrick Hurley (1946–1950)	Niko Mirosevich (Note: Evicted by Italy in July 1941; fled to Switzerland.); Peter Benzon (circa 1949)	Minister chargé d'affaires

=== Apostolic visitor ===
Territory	Apostolic visitor
Independent State of Croatia	Giuseppe Marcone

=== chargé d'affaires ===
Territory	chargé d'affaires
Slovak Republic	Giuseppe Burzio

== World War II ==
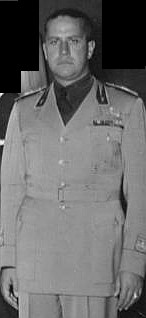
Ciano, Mussolini's son-in-law, became Vatican ambassador in 1943.

Some of Pius XII's nuncios in occupied Europe were forced to flee their nunciatures, including Clemente Micara in Belgium, internuncio Paolo Giobbe in The Netherlands, and Casimir Papée in Poland. The nuncio to Luxembourg was similarly "overrun by German troops". Micara and Giobbe eventually found their ways to Rome. The Yugoslav and Romanian ambassadors also ended up in Rome but were told in 1944 to be ready to return at a moment's notice. The Baltic nuncios in Estonia, Latvia, and Lithuania were forced out by Russian troops. Although the nuncios de jure retained their titles, their role was either terminated or de facto taken up by Cesare Orsenigo, the nuncio to Germany.

Thus, Pius XIi maintained only eight wartime nunciatures to European nations, in: France, Germany, Hungary, Italy, Portugal, Romania, Spain, and Switzerland. These were supplemented by apostolic delegates in Albania, Bulgaria, Great Britain, Turkey, and the United States. A chargé d'affaires was created during the war to represent the newly created Slovak Republic, and an apostolic visitor was sent to the Nazi puppet state of Croatia.

By June 15, 1940, there were no longer any Allied ambassadors residing in Italian territory (the norm for ambassadors to the Vatican): the Polish, French, and British ambassadors entered Vatican City proper; Nieuwenhuys initially declined Vatican protection on June 16 to flee to Switzerland along with the Belgian ambassador to Italy, but decided to stay on June 18. Italy was at war with France, Britain, South Africa, Canada, and New Zealand, and had severed diplomatic relations with Belgium, Norway, the Netherlands, and Poland; of those, only France, Britain, Belgium, and Poland had resident ambassadors at the Vatican.

The same protection was not extended to Niko Mirosevich, the Yugoslav Minister, when he was ousted by Italy in July 1941. However, the ambassadors in the city-state were joined by Harold H. Tittmann, Jr, who remained as chargé d'affaires after Taylor's departure, after he was required to move into Vatican City by Italy on December 13, 1941.

After the Allied occupation of Rome, the Allied ambassadors moved out of Vatican City and the Japanese, German, Hungarian, Romanian, and Slovak delegations moved into the city-state, escorted by US troops. High-ranking Nazi Ernst von Weizsäcker and Mussolini's son-in-law Galeazzo Ciano both became ambassadors to the Vatican in 1943; it was believed that von Weizsäcker's main job was to keep an eye on Ciano lest the pope assist Italy in negotiating a separate peace with the Allies.

== The Holocaust ==
Morley's Vatican Diplomacy and the Jews during the Holocaust (KTAV, 1980) is a comprehensive country-by-country study of Vatican diplomacy, using primary sources from the nuncios themselves up to the Cardinal Secretary of State and Pius XII himself. Morley's study draws heavily on the ADSS vols. 1–9, supplemented by documents from the Centre de Documentation Juive Contemporaine (Paris), British Foreign Office, Public Records Office (London), Institute for Jewish Affairs (London), the Nuremberg Trials, the World Jewish Congress archives (New York), and Yad Vashem (Jerusalem). The central conclusion of Morley is as follows:

This study of the Vatican and Jewish sources has revealed little evidence that the nuncios manifested any consistent humanitarian concern about the sufferings of the Jews during the years 1939 to 1943. This research has indicated that the Vatican diplomats only rarely acted on behalf of the Jews as Jews, and this usually only for specific individuals. They sometimes had words of sympathy for the Jews, but little action followed from these words.

However, Morley does find a multitude of examples of Vatican diplomats protesting against the effects of racial laws on Jews who converted to Catholicism before and during the Holocaust, as well as numerous interventions on their behalf.

Pius defender William Doino, Jr., writes that critics find major flaws in Morley's work, such as that he blames Pius for not confronting the Nazis but then admits in other parts of the book that such confrontations did little good when they did occur; that he accuses the Vatican of being "too diplomatic" at times and too "acrimonious" at others; that he accuses Pius of failing to help unbaptized Jews but doesn't acknowledge when Pius did extend help to unbaptized Jews; and that generally he "dismisses a wealth of documentation and scholarship that contradicts his thesis," such as when he denigrates Pius's efforts to maintain diplomatic relations with Germany and fails to acknowledge that the Vatican's diplomatic status allowed Pius to keep in touch with the German resistance and pass vital information he received from Germany onto Allies.

== After World War II ==
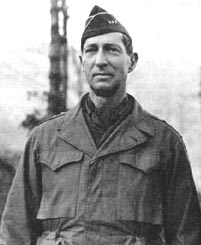
Truman attempted to appoint General Mark Wayne Clark, a World War II hero, as ambassador but opposition from Protestant leaders forced the withdrawal of the nomination.

Pius XII allowed Ernst von Weizsäcker, the former Nazi ambassador, to remain in Rome as a "guest" after Nazi Germany ceased to exist and he lost his status as an ambassador. Similar status was accorded to former Vichy France ambassador Léon Bérard, even after Pius XII received Jacques Maritain as French ambassador in 1945. von Weizsäcker was given political asylum for a time, although the Allies wished to charge him with war crimes (he would eventually be convicted at Nuremberg).

Ken Harada, the Japanese ambassador, remained in the Vatican "on much the same basis", while the Holy See protested that it had not yet received "official notification" from Gen. Douglas MacArthur that it should sever relations. As he was no longer accredited to the Vatican, Harada was not allowed to participate in a New Year's Day 1946 event, although Pius XII granted him a separate audience a few days later. Harada was received in a final farewell audience on January 25, 1946, before being repatriated, following MacArthur's order discontinuing Japan's diplomatic service.

After World War II relations were strained or cut with several Communist Eastern European nations. For example, there was no Apostolic Nuncio to Poland between 1947 and 1989.

After the resignation of US presidential envoy Myron Charles Taylor in 1950, Truman struggled to replace Taylor. American Protestant leaders opposed the continuation of the mission (including Truman's own pastor, Edward Pruden), and the Vatican wanted a full ambassador, not another "personal envoy". The appointment of General Mark Wayne Clark as United States Ambassador to the Holy See was withdrawn after a prolonged Senate fight. Clark had been the Allied Commander in Italy, known for the bombing of the historic abbey of Monte Cassino but also his triumphant entry into Rome in 1944.

== Primary sources ==
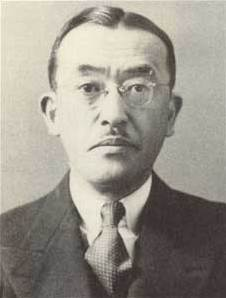
Ken Harada: first ambassador from Japan to the Holy See

As of 2002, no complete set of diplomatic papers has been published by any country with diplomatic relations with the Holy See during Pius XII's pontificate, although partial sets have been published in various works. However, the outrage over Rolf Hochhuth's 1963 play The Deputy prompted Pope Paul VI in 1964 to authorize the opening of Pius XII's diplomatic papers prior to the usual seventy-five year rule. Four Jesuit Priests were allowed into the archives and eleven volumes, Actes et documents du Saint Siège relatifs à la Seconde Guerre Mondiale (ADSS), were published between 1965 and 1981, covering only the wartime years.

Several diplomats at the Vatican wrote memoirs covering the period of Pius XII's pontificate, including the Free French ambassadors François Charles-Roux and Wladimir d'Ormesson and Polish ambassador Casimir Papée. Others have had their wartime papers published, including German ambassador Ernst von Weizsäcker and British Minister D'Arcy Osborne. Osborne's papers formed the basis of Owen Chadwick's Britain and the Vatican during the Second World War (1988). Wartime Correspondence Between President Roosevelt and Pope Pius XII was published in 2005 with a foreword and notes by Myron Charles Taylor.

The post-war papers of Aloisius Joseph Muench were also extensively preserved, and indexed at the Catholic University of America since 1976. The documents are the subject of a 2006 monograph by Dr. Suzanne Brown-Fleming, a fellow at the United States Holocaust Memorial Museum's Center for Advanced Holocaust Studies.
