= Boatnerd =

Boat-related web site and non-profit organization

- Headquarters: Port Huron, Michigan, U.S.
- Region served: Great Lakes
- Website: https://boatnerd.com/

The Boatnerd corporation is a registered not-for-profit corporation that provides information about vessels operating on the Great Lakes of North America.

== Services ==
The organization holds annual festivals at locations of interest to those engaged in maritime commerce on the Great Lakes. The Globe and Mail profiled Boatnerd in 2008, when its festival was held at a shipyard in Port Colborne, Ontario, where the Calumet, an 80-year-old lake freighter, was being scrapped.

According to The Globe and Mail, the site's volunteers sometimes report breaking news before it is announced by official authorities. The newspaper quoted a volunteer who noted that while professional mariners occasionally teased the volunteers, they also monitored the site and would promptly correct any errors.

The organization maintains an office in Port Huron, Michigan, overlooking the confluence of the St. Clair and Black Rivers. The site went online in 1995 and became a registered not-for-profit corporation in 2006, under the name Great Lakes & Seaway Shipping Online.

The organization also conducts fund-raising raffles that offer unusual prizes. Some Great Lakes freighters were originally built with an "owner's suite," which is rarely used today. Through partnerships with shipping companies, the organization has arranged for donors to win cruises aboard working lake freighters in these suites. Seventy-six donors have participated in such cruises.

== Recognition ==
When Acheson Ventures provided space for the organization's headquarters in its Maritime Center overlooking the St. Clair River, it described Boatnerd as "the most widely used website for Great Lakes maritime information." Reporters have considered the site reliable enough to cite or quote by name in their articles.

The organization was profiled by The Globe and Mail in 2008.

In December 2014, travel writer Bob Boughner wrote in the Chatham Daily News that "the average person, like myself, would have no idea where the ships were headed or what they were carrying if it wasn't for a relatively new organization headquartered in Port Huron, Mich., known as BoatNerd.com."
