= Giuseppe Marcone =

Italian Benedictine abbot (1882–1952)

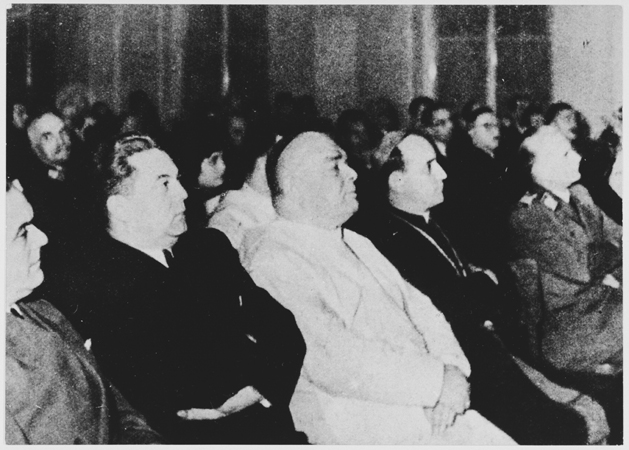
Andrija Artuković, Alojzije Stepinac and Giuseppe Ramiro Marcone.

Giuseppe Ramiro Marcone, OSB (1882, San Pietro Infine, Italy – 1952, Montevergine) was an Italian Benedictine abbot. He was ordained in 1906 and appointed Abbot of Montevergine in 1918. He served an apostolic visitor to Croatia during World War II, in which capacity he worked on behalf of the Holy See for the protection of Croatian Jews.

In 1941, Pope Pius XII dispatched Marcone as apostolic visitor to Nazi-aligned Croatia, in order to assist Archbishop Aloysius Stepinac and the Croatian Episcopate in "combating the evil influence of neo-pagan propaganda which could be exercised in the organization of the new state". Marcone served as nuncio in all but name. He reported to Rome on the deteriorating conditions for Croatian Jews, made representations on behalf of the Jews to Croatian officials, and transported Jewish children to safety in neutral Turkey. However, he made no efforts on behalf of Serb victims of the Ustaše.

When deportation of Croatian Jews began, Stepinac and Marcone protested to Andrija Artuković. In his study of rescuers of Jews during the Holocaust, Martin Gilbert wrote, "In the Croatian capital of Zagreb, as a result of intervention by [Marcone] on behalf of Jewish partners in mixed marriages, a thousand Croat Jews survived the war.

Marcone died in 1952.

== See also ==
- Catholic Church and Nazi Germany
- Foreign relations of Pope Pius XII
- Rescue of Jews by Catholics during the Holocaust
