= Harold H. Tittmann Jr. =

American diplomat (1893–1980)

2nd Director General of the International Organization for Migration
- In office April 27, 1955 – May 13, 1958
- Preceded by: Hugh S. Gibson
- Succeeded by: Marcus Daly

Chargé d’Affaires ad interim of the Personal Representative of the President to the Holy See
- In office December 29, 1941 – July 8, 1944
- President: Franklin D. Roosevelt
- Preceded by: Myron Charles Taylor
- Succeeded by: Henry Cabot Lodge Jr.

United States Ambassador to Haiti
- In office July 12, 1946 – July 17, 1948
- President: Harry S. Truman
- Preceded by: Orme Wilson Jr.
- Succeeded by: William E. DeCourcy

United States Ambassador to Peru
- In office September 27, 1948 – March 30, 1955
- President: Harry S. Truman
- Preceded by: Prentice Cooper
- Succeeded by: Ellis O. Briggs

Personal details
- Born: January 8, 1893 St. Louis, Missouri, U.S.
- Died: February 27, 1980 (aged 87) Manchester, Massachusetts, U.S.
- Education: Yale University

Military service
- Branch/service: United States Army
- Rank: First lieutenant
- Awards: Distinguished Service Cross, Croix de Guerre

Harold Hilgard Tittmann Jr. (January 8, 1893 – December 29, 1980) was an American diplomat and expert on Fascist Italy who served as Franklin D. Roosevelt's representative to the Vatican City during World War II.

== Early life and education ==
Harold Hilgard Tittmann Jr. was born in 1893 in St. Louis, Missouri, into a family of German immigrants who came to this country from the Saxon city of Dresden. His grandfather, Edward Tittmann, was the first ancestor to come to America, arriving in Belleville, Illinois, in 1833. His father Harold Hilgard Tittmann was the seventh child born to Edward and Rosa Hilgard Tittmann. He attended the Taft School in Connecticut, graduating in 1912 and then entered Yale University where he graduated in 1916. He worked for a year before the United States entered World War I.

== Military service ==
After the United States entered World War I in 1917, he enlisted in the United States Army Air Service. In June 1918 he was assigned to Eddie Rickenbacker's 94th Pursuit Squadron based in northeastern France and became a fighter pilot with the rank of First Lieutenant. On June 3, 1918, while on patrol over German-held territory, he was attacked by five German fighter planes, one of which he shot down. With his aircraft riddled with bullets and himself severely wounded, he managed to fly back to French territory and crash-land in a wheat field. He was taken to a U.S. Military field hospital where initially his condition was considered hopeless. He spent two years in military hospitals, first in France and later in America. He miraculously recovered. However he lost his right leg, a kidney, and half of one lung, incurring as well major bone damage to his arms and remaining leg. He was reputed to be the most severely wounded-in-action American to have survived the First World War. He was decorated for bravery by both the American and French governments, being awarded the U.S. Distinguished Service Cross for Extraordinary Heroism as well as the French Croix de Guerre.

== Diplomatic career ==
In 1920, he joined the U.S. Foreign Service and was sent to the American Embassy in Paris as Third Secretary. In 1925, the year that Benito Mussolini asserted his right to supreme power and became dictator of Italy, he was posted to the Rome embassy where he remained for the next eleven years, thus becoming one of the State Department's leading experts on Fascist Italy. There he met Eleanor Barclay, from San Antonio, Texas. They were married in 1928. Their first son, Harold III was born in 1929, and their second son, Barclay, was born in 1932.

In 1936, he was transferred to the State Department in Washington, where he spent three years in the Division of Western European Affairs. In August 1939, a few weeks before the outbreak of World War II he was assigned to Geneva, Switzerland, as Consul General. His involvement with the Vatican began at that time as he was also assigned to be part-time assistant to Myron Taylor, President Roosevelt's personal representative to the Vatican. Although most European countries had ambassadors to the Vatican, because of religious objections from a largely Protestant nation, the President could not politically appoint an American ambassador to the Pope. A concerted effort was made many times by Taylor to persuade the Pope to try to influence Mussolini to remain neutral in the war. The Pope sent many messages to Mussolini during the first half of 1940, as did Taylor, but on June 10, 1940, after the defeat of the British Expeditionary Force (BEF), Italy declared war on England. After that happened, it became clear that the mission had failed. The European ambassadors to Italy moved out of the embassies into Vatican City as diplomatic relations with Italy were cut. After Pearl Harbor and the US. entry into the war in 1941, Tittmann was reassigned to Rome, and he also moved into the Vatican where he became the Charge d'Affaires and the chief source of information to President Roosevelt of the happenings inside Fascist Italy. After Taylor returned to the United States, Tittmann remained inside Vatican City until the liberation of Rome in 1944. At that time he and his family moved back to Rome where he remained until 1946.

== Post-war career ==
He was then appointed Ambassador to Haiti. In 1948 he was named Ambassador to Peru, a post he held until 1955. He then became the Director of the Intergovernmental Committee for European Migration in Geneva (International Organization for Migration) from 1955 until his retirement in 1958 at the age of 65. He spent his retirement writing the memoirs of his Vatican assignment during World War II, which were edited and published by his son Harold H. Tittmann III. He died in Manchester, Massachusetts, on December 29, 1980, a few days prior to his 88th birthday.
