= Calumet (1929 ship) =

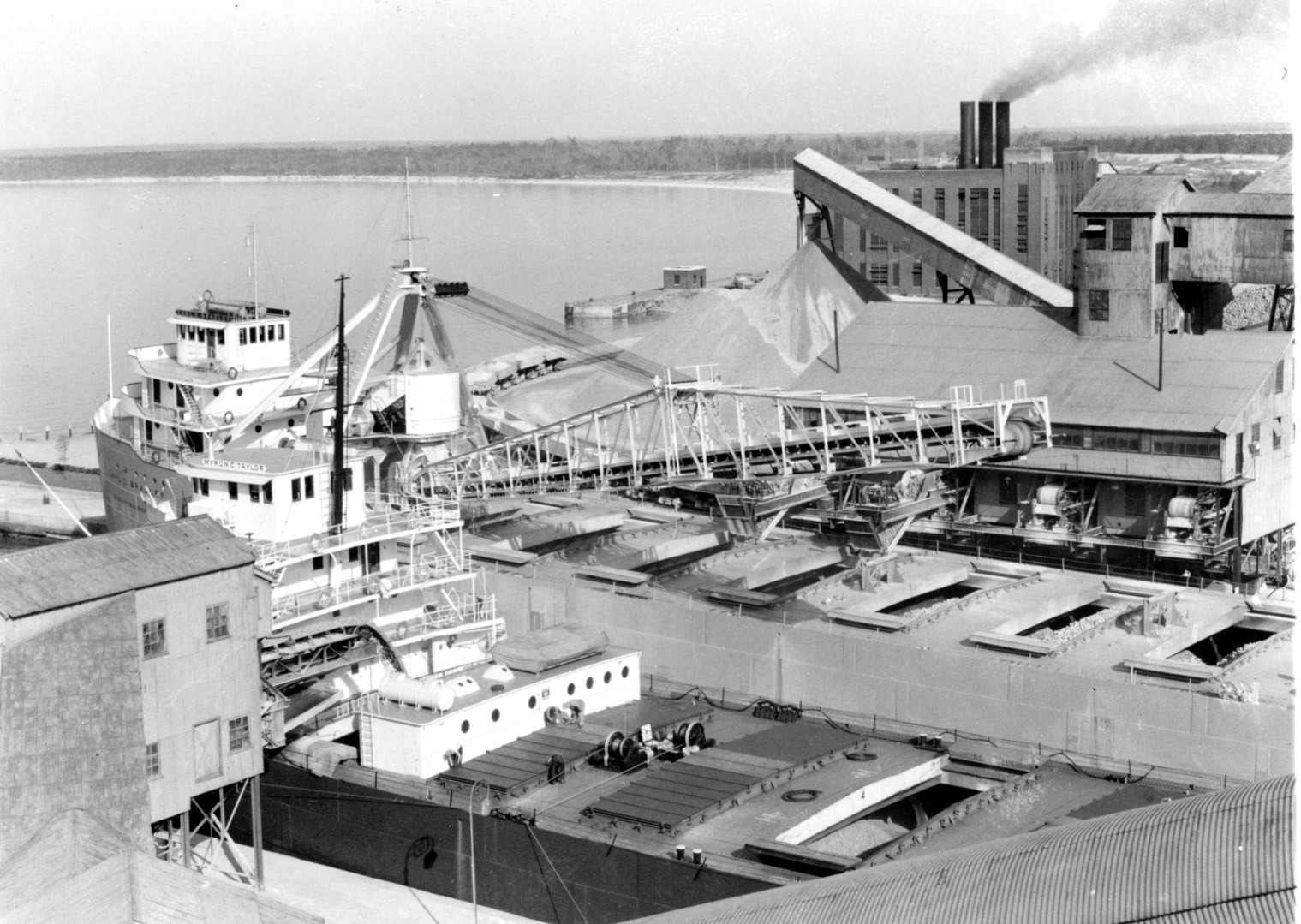
- Myron C. Taylor and Carl D. Bradley loading at Michigan Limestone

History

United States
- Name: Myron C. Taylor (1929–2000); Calumet (2000–2008)
- Owner: US Steel (1929–2000); Lower Lakes Towing (2000–2008)
- Operator: Pittsburgh Steamship Company (1929–1956); Bradley Transportation Company (1956–1967); Pittsburgh Steamship Company (1967–2000); Grand River Navigation Company (2000–2008)
- Builder: Great Lakes Engineering Works, River Rouge (Detroit)
- Yard number: 269
- Launched: July 15, 1929
- Maiden voyage: August 27, 1929
- Identification: IMO number: 5244807
- Fate: Scrapped, 2008

General characteristics
- Type: Bulk carrier
- Tonnage: 12,450
- Length: 184.02 m (603 ft 9 in)
- Beam: 18.29 m (60 ft 0 in)
- Depth: 9.75 m (32 ft 0 in)
- Propulsion: 3,114 kW (4,176 bhp)

Calumet was the second lake freighter of that name. The vessel was built in Detroit, Michigan, in 1929, by the Great Lakes Engineering Works. For her first 71 years she was operated by two subsidiaries of US Steel, the Pittsburgh Steamship Company, and the Bradley Transportation Company. She was christened Myron C. Taylor after one of the directors of US Steel, Myron Charles Taylor.

She was originally powered by a triple expansion steam engine. During her eighty years in service she was upgraded with a self-unloading boom and conveyor belts, a bow thruster, and her steam engine was replaced with a more powerful diesel. According to George Wharton, of the Boatnerd website, she was the largest vessel in the US Steel's fleets, when built, but by 1981, she had become one of the smallest.

In 1956 US Steel shifted her to the fleet of the Bradley Transportation Company, due to an increased need to transport limestone, one of the materials needed in the manufacture of steel. At that time the vessel was retrofitted with a large self-unloading boom and the accompanying change in her holds and the addition of conveyor belts below her holds. Her original steam engine produced 1,618 kilowatts (2,170 bhp), and over the winter of 1967/1968 her steam engine was replaced with a diesel producing 3,114 kilowatts (4,176 bhp). Her bow thruster was retrofitted in 1988.

She experienced a number of groundings, collisions and other incidents, none of which caused loss of life or serious damage. When she was damaged in 2007, she was not repaired because she was scheduled to be retired later that year.

She was scrapped at Port Colborne, Ontario in 2008.
