= Myron Charles Taylor =

American diplomat (1874–1959)

Myron Taylor
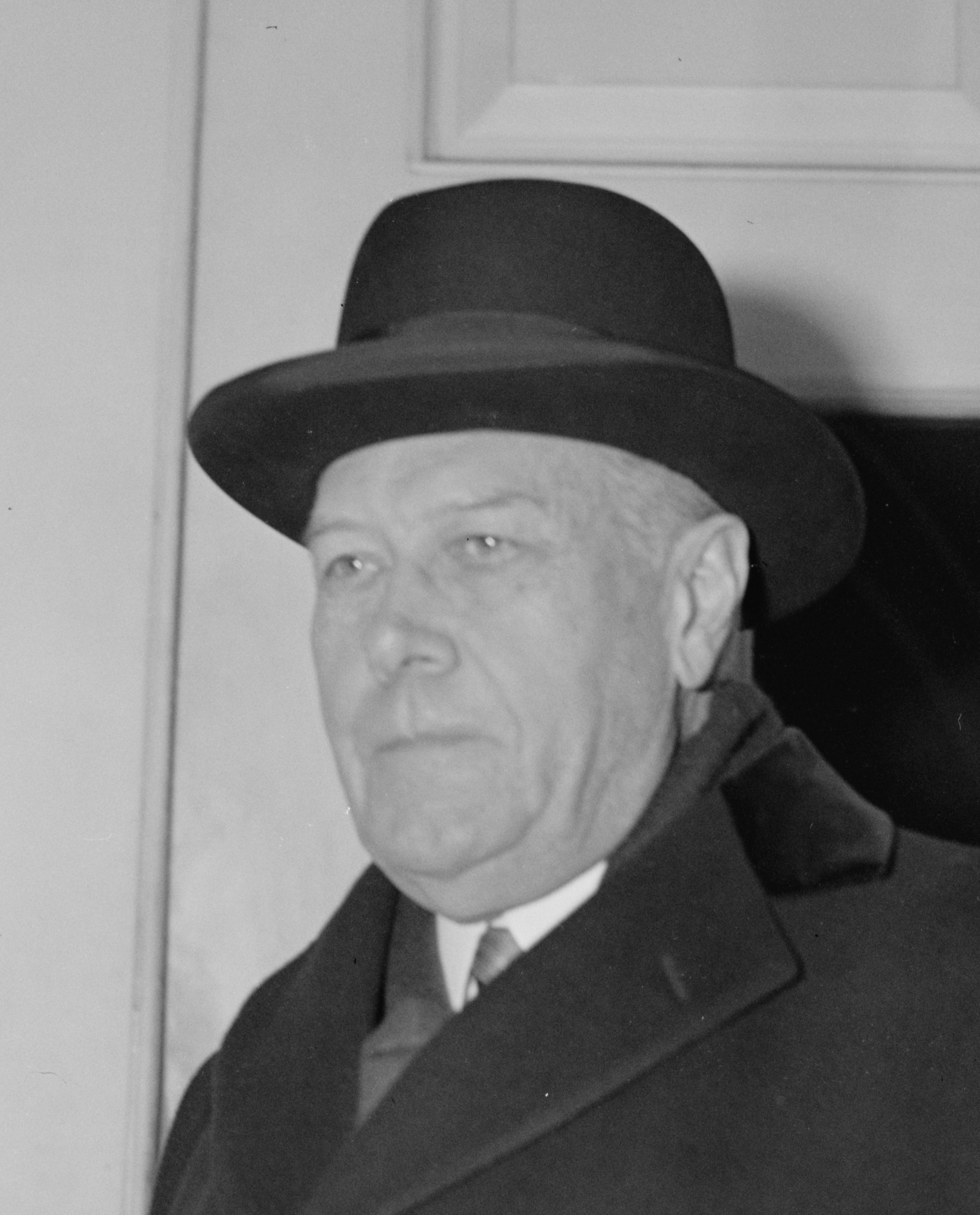
- Born: Myron Charles Taylor; January 18, 1874; Lyons, New York, U.S.
- Died: May 5, 1959 (aged 85); New York City, U.S.
- Resting place: Locust Valley Cemetery, Locust Valley, New York, U.S.
- Education: Cornell University (LLB)
- Occupations: Diplomacy, finance, industrialism, philanthropy
- Spouse: Anabel Mack
- Parent(s): William Delling Taylor and Mary Morgan (née Underhill) Taylor

Myron Charles Taylor (January 18, 1874 – May 5, 1959) was an American industrialist, and later a diplomat involved in many of the most important geopolitical events during and after World War II.

In addition he was a philanthropist, giving to his alma mater, Cornell University, and a number of other causes.

== Early life and career ==
Taylor was born in Lyons, New York, to William Delling Taylor and Mary Morgan (née Underhill) Taylor. His father owned and operated a tannery business. Taylor graduated from the Cornell Law School in 1894. He returned to Lyons and for the next five years attempted to establish a small-town law practice. He also twice ran for the New York State Assembly as a Democrat, and both times was defeated.

In 1900, Taylor left Lyons to join his brother Willard Underhill Taylor (Cornell, A.B., class of 1891) on Wall Street in New York City, New York. His focus turned to corporate law, practicing at the firm of DeForest Brothers & DeForest. Taylor handled litigation for his father's tannery and subsequently won a U.S. government contract for mail pouches and related products. He moved into the textile and mail delivery business and, according to the Finger Lakes Times, invented the transparent "window" in envelopes through which an address is displayed.

Taylor's efforts in the textile industry expanded to the cotton markets, identifying opportunities to acquire struggling cotton mills, reworking labor practices and updating the technology they used. This approach later became known as the "Taylor Formula". Seeing the potential of the infant automotive industry, he established a textile firm that became the leading supplier of combined tire fabric. During World War I his plants became the leading suppliers to the American military effort. Following the war he saw a boom-bust cycle coming and disposed of all his interests in the mills.

== U.S. Steel ==
With his now-sizable fortune he could have retired, but at the urging of two leading Wall Street bankers (J. P. Morgan, Jr. and George F. Baker), Taylor was recruited to help turn around the finances of U.S. Steel. It was once the largest steel producer and largest corporation in the world. On September 15, 1925, he was elected a director and member of its powerful finance committee. He became the committee's chairman in 1929. From March 29, 1932, until April 5, 1938, he was U.S. Steel's chairman and chief executive officer.

During the Great Depression, he applied the "Taylor Formula" again — closing or selling plants; reorganizing the corporate structure; and upgrading and modernizing the company's operations and technology. One defining moment occurred in 1937, when Taylor struck a deal with labor leader John L. Lewis who, at the time, was head of the Congress of Industrial Organizations (CIO). Through the deal, U.S. Steel agreed to recognize a CIO subsidiary for purposes of representing and organizing U.S. Steel workers, becoming the first major industrial corporation to take this historic step. The basis for the deal later became known as the "Myron Taylor Labor Formula", defining how to bring about labor stability and long-term prosperity for the company:

"The Company recognizes the right of its employees to bargain collectively through representatives freely chosen by them without dictation, coercion or intimidation in any form or from any source. It will negotiate and contract with the representatives of any group of its employees so chosen and with any organization as the representative of its members, subject to the recognition of the principle that the right to work is not dependent on membership or non-membership in any organization and subject to the right of every employee freely to bargain in such manner and through such representatives, if any, as he chooses."

Taylor soon was featured on the covers of or in articles in Time, Fortune, Business Week, The New Yorker, and The Saturday Evening Post. He did not officially retire from the board until January 12, 1956.

U.S. Steel named one of its new lake freighters the Myron C. Taylor in 1929. It sailed under this name until it was sold off in 2000.

== Diplomat ==
=== International affairs ===
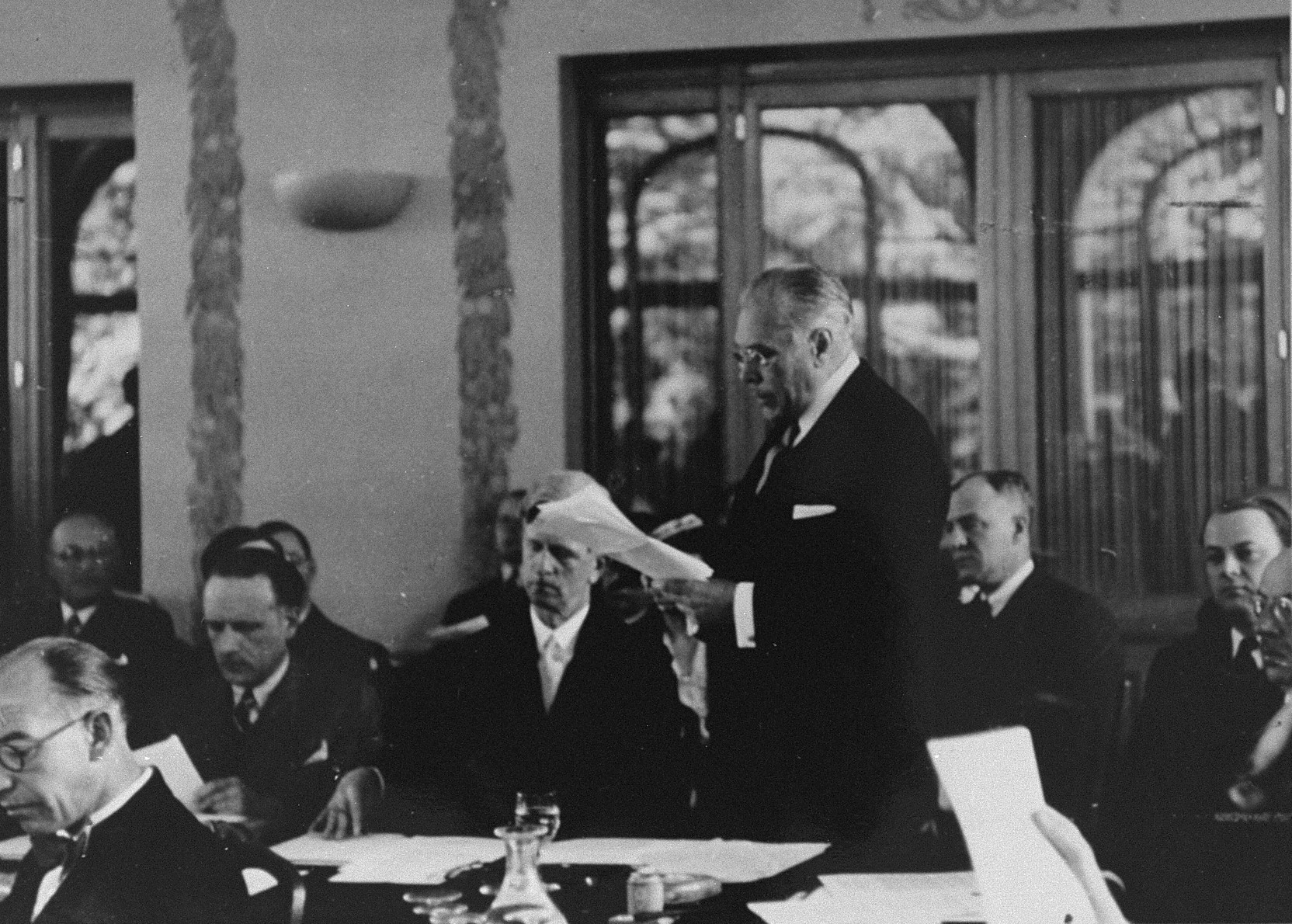
Myron Taylor addresses the Évian Conference

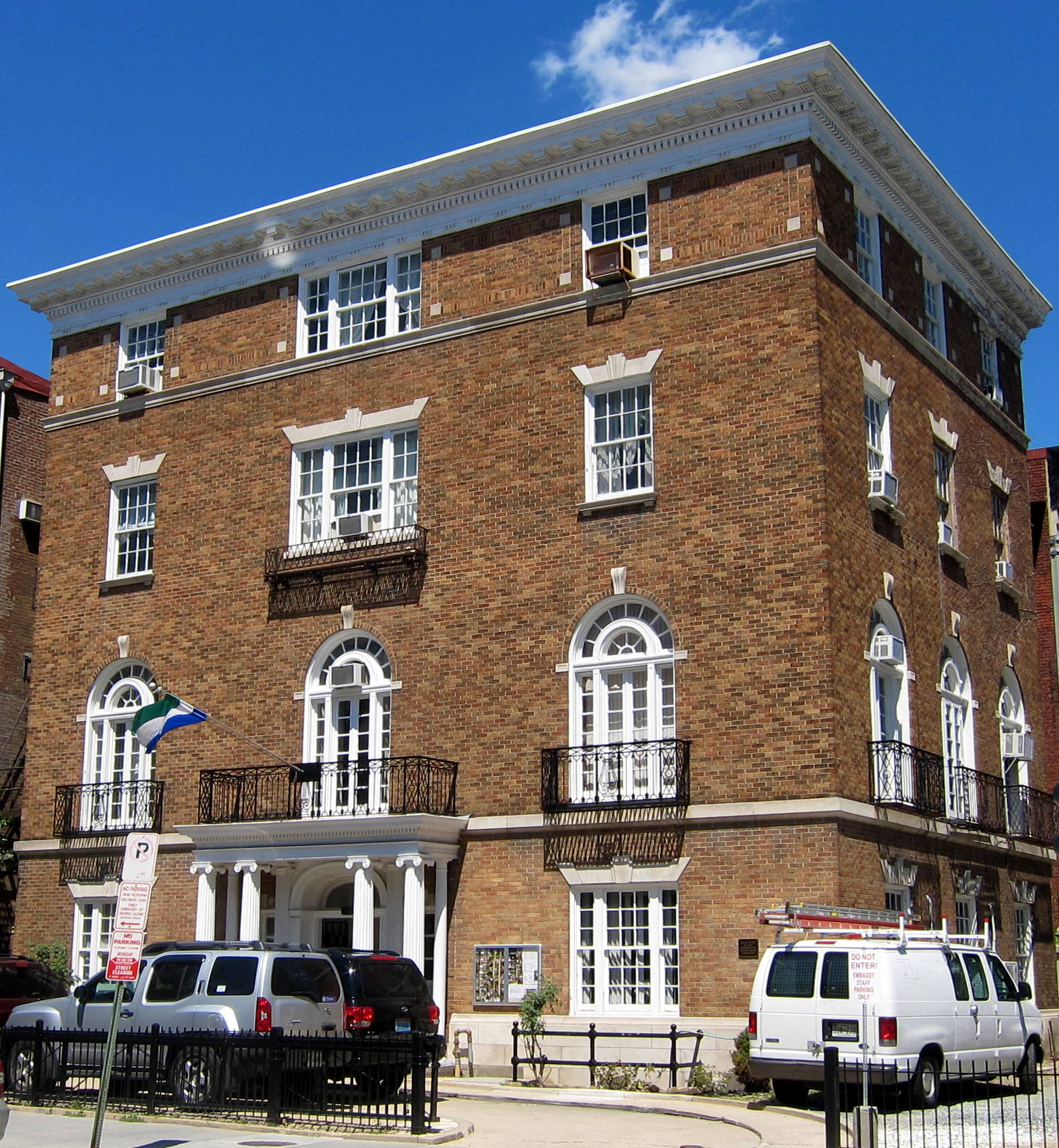
Taylor's former residence in Washington, D.C.

In July 1938 he represented the U.S. at the Évian Conference in Évian-les-Bains, France, which convened at the initiative of U.S. President Franklin D. Roosevelt to discuss the issue of increasing numbers of Jewish refugees fleeing Nazi persecution leading up to the onset of World War II.

Before German Nazi leader Adolf Hitler turned to mass extermination of Jews by way of The Holocaust, the possibility of having refugees sent to willing countries was posed. Sumner Welles, the U.S. Under Secretary of State had proposed an international conference to address immigration issues.

Going into the conference Roosevelt gave Taylor the instruction: "All you need to do is get these people together." Taylor was appointed chairman, and while he was not able to get concessions on immigration, a proposal to create the Intergovernmental Committee on Refugees was approved.

=== Personal envoy to Pope Pius XII ===
On December 22, 1939, Roosevelt asked Taylor "to take on a special mission for me" to be Roosevelt's "personal envoy" to Pope Pius XII.

Taylor's appointment was announced on December 23, 1939, and confirmed in Rome, Italy, on February 28, 1940. Taylor served from 1940 throughout the rest of Roosevelt's presidency (his death in 1945) and continued as President Harry S. Truman's "personal envoy" until 1950. Although appointed as a "Peace Ambassador" and "personal envoy", Taylor was extended ambassador status by the Holy See on February 13, 1940.

His appointment to that diplomatic position was officially protested by many American Protestant Christian denominations, including Methodists, Presbyterians, Lutherans, Baptists and Seventh-day Adventists, who opposed the United States maintaining diplomatic relations with the Vatican.

Taylor left Rome on September 22, 1941, flying to Lisbon and London on the way back to the U.S. Initially he was ordered to work to prevent Italy from joining the war with Germany. Later he would be influential in urging limited bombing of Rome in 1943–1944 by the Allies of World War II, and then only of specific military targets, in order to preserve the cultural resources of the ancient city.

Harold H. Tittmann Jr. remained as chargé d'affaires after Taylor's departure. Given the rising tensions, he was required to move into Vatican City on December 13, 1941, after the Japanese bombed Pearl Harbor and the US entered World War II against the Axis Powers. Taylor returned to Rome in September 1942, but went back to the US in October of that year.

Later, he was able to lobby for an Allied military airbase in neutral Portugal that was ultimately granted. As the war approached its end and afterwards, Taylor recognized the Italian people were in dire need of necessities. He established American Relief for Italy, an organization that became the primary means to provide food, clothing and medicine to millions of suffering Italians. In a short time approximately $6 million in public funds were raised and over $37 million in relief supplies were distributed.

Taylor intended to step down after the war ended. Following Roosevelt's death, he agreed to stay on and to help President Harry S. Truman, who succeeded to office. Truman charged Taylor to work "not only with the Pope but with other leaders in the spiritual world and in the world of politics and secular affairs as he travels through Europe in the fulfillment of his mission."

Taylor resigned in January 1950. Truman recalled Taylor's assistant, Franklin C. Gowan, prompting speculation that the U.S. would reduce its relations with the Vatican and its officials. Protestant leaders continued to oppose US relations with the Vatican.

== Awards ==
In 1929, a lake freighter operated by a subsidiary of US Steel was named the Myron C. Taylor in his honor.

On December 20, 1948, President Truman awarded Taylor the Medal for Merit — one of the highest civilian decoration of the U.S. awarded to civilians for exceptionally meritorious conduct.

Taylor was named a Knight of the Order of Pope Pius IX.

== Retirement ==
Taylor's country home in Locust Valley, New York, was situated on the site of a farm started by an English colonial ancestor, Captain John Underhill. After the Underhill house was damaged in a fire, Taylor did not tear it down. Instead, he encased it in a new façade designed by the architect Harrie T. Lindeberg. Taylor took an active interest in Underhill — placing a marker at the entrance to the Underhill Burying Ground in 1953 and creating an endowment to assist with the perpetual maintenance. The marker reads: "Erected by Myron C. Taylor in honor of his mother Mary Morgan Underhill Taylor, 1953".

== Philanthropy and charitable activity ==
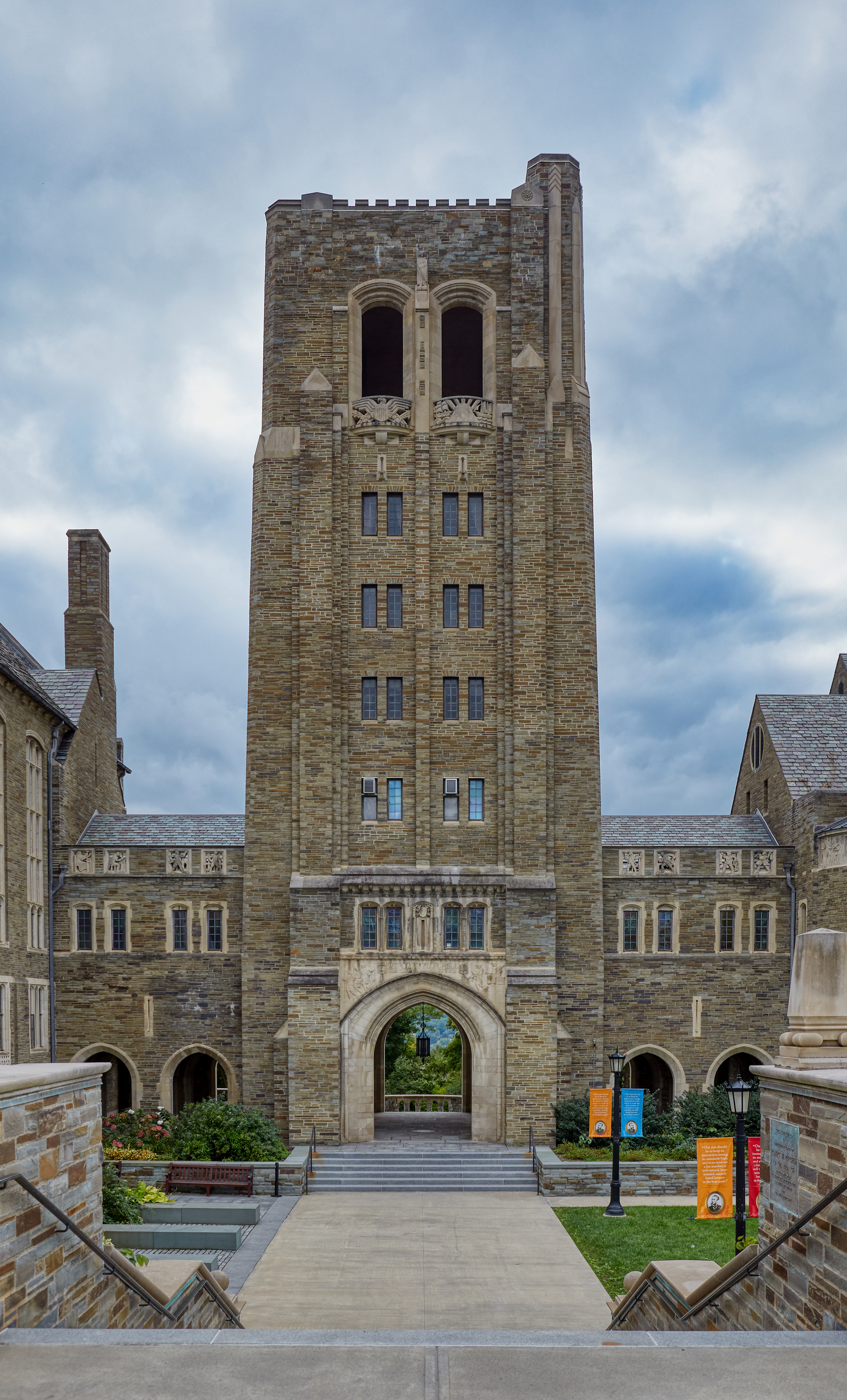
Myron Taylor Hall at Cornell Law School

Taylor gave $1.5 million (~$21.6 million in 2024) in 1928 to Cornell University for the construction of a new building complex for its Cornell Law School and Law Library. The new space allowed the library five floors of stacks for over 200,000 volumes.

The dedication was in the Moot Court Room on October 15, 1932, with a buffet luncheon in the Reading Room following. Taylor and his wife, Anabel, presented the keys to the hall to then-Cornell University President Livingston Farrand.

Among his last-remaining projects after his retirement was overseeing his 1949 gift to Cornell to build a $1.5 million (~$15.6 million in 2024) structure adjoining its law school (which he had also helped to build). The new building, Anabel Taylor Hall, was named in his wife's honor and built to serve as an interdenominational religious center. Funds from Taylor also went toward the establishment of the Myron Taylor Lectures on Foreign Affairs, and for the Charles Evans Hughes residence center.

Myron and Anabel Taylor contributed several items to The Metropolitan Museum of Art in New York City, or owned artwork that was later given by another collector. Among these items include:

- a statuette of the god Anubis as embalmer, Ptolemaic Period, c. 332-30 BC (given by Mr. and Mrs. Myron Taylor in 1938)
- Bouquet of Chrysanthemums, Pierre-Auguste Renoir, 1881 (purchased by Taylor by 1937, sold in 1961 to Annenberg, bequest to the Metropolitan Museum of Art in 2002).

== Death ==
Taylor quietly lived out his final years, never seeking public accolades or recognition. His wife, Anabel, died on December 12, 1958. He died five months later on May 5, 1959, at his home on 16 East 70th Street, Manhattan, New York, at the age of 85. Myron is buried in Locust Valley Cemetery, Locust Valley, New York.

Truman paid tribute noting, "The Honorable Myron C. Taylor performed great services for both me and my predecessor in the White House to the Vatican at a time when it was essential that the United States be represented in that quarter. Undoubtedly, no one could have performed the job as well as he did ... All of this should be deeply grateful for the unselfish works of this fine man and able public servant."

== See also ==
- Foreign relations of Pope Pius XII
- United States Ambassador to the Holy See
- United States Steel

== Notes ==
Business positions
Preceded by J.P. Morgan Jr.	Chairman of U.S. Steel; March 29, 1932 – April 5, 1938	Succeeded by Edward Stettinius Jr.
