= Bombing of Rome in World War II =

Bombing of Rome
- Part of the Winter Line and the battle for Rome
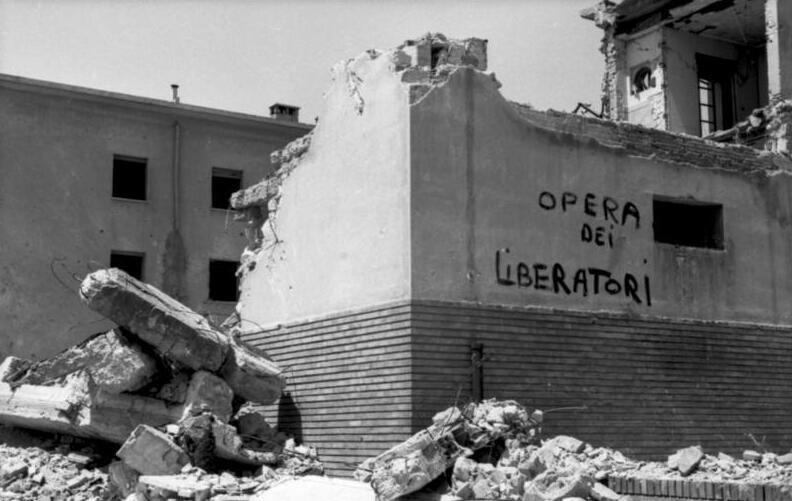
- Inscription on the wall of a bombed building translated as "Work of the Liberators"; Rome, 1944
Date	19 July 1943 – 5 June 1944 (10 months, 2 weeks)
Location	Rome, Italy
Result	Allied victory

Belligerents
United Kingdom; United States (Kingdom of Italy) Italy (from 8 September)	Italy (until 8 September); Italian Social Republic; Germany

Commanders and leaders
(United Kingdom) Arthur Harris (United Kingdom) Arthur Tedder (United States) Jimmy Doolittle (United States) Henry H. Arnold	(Fascist Italy) Renato Sandalli (Nazi Germany) Albert Kesselring

Casualties and losses
600 aircraft shot down 3,600 air crew	719 casualties 1,659 injured 3,000 to 5,000 civilian deaths

Rome, along with Vatican City, was bombed several times during 1943 and 1944, primarily by Allied and to a smaller degree by Axis aircraft, before the city was liberated by the Allies on June 4, 1944. Pope Pius XII was initially unsuccessful in attempting to have Rome declared an open city, through negotiations with U.S. President Franklin D. Roosevelt via Archbishop (later Cardinal) Francis Spellman. Rome was eventually declared an open city on August 14, 1943 (a day after the last Allied bombing raid) by the defending Italian forces.

The first bombing raid was on July 19, 1943, when 690 aircraft of the United States Army Air Forces (USAAF) flew over Rome and dropped 9,125 bombs on the city. Though the raid targeted the freight yard and steel factory in the San Lorenzo district of Rome, Allied bombs also struck the district's apartment blocks, damaging the Papal Basilica and killing 1,500 people. Pius XII, who had previously requested Roosevelt not to bomb Rome due to "its value to the whole of humanity", paid a visit to the affected regions of the district; photographs of his visit later became a symbol of anti-war sentiments in Italy. The Allied bombing raids continued throughout 1943 and extended into 1944. In the United States, while the majority of the American media supported the bombing raids, many Catholic newspapers condemned them.

In the 110,000 sorties that comprised the Allied Rome air campaign, 600 aircraft were lost and 3,600 air crew members died; 60,000 tons of bombs were dropped in the 78 days before Rome was captured by the Allies on June 4, 1944.

== Circumstances ==
On 25 July 1943, after Allied forces had conquered the Italian possessions in Africa and had taken Sicily, the Fascist Grand Council removed Benito Mussolini from power. The Kingdom of Italy at first remained an ally of Nazi Germany, but in less than two months secured an armistice with the Allies, signed on 3 September and announced on 8 September. Germany, which had discovered what was afoot, quickly intervened and took military control of most of Italy, including Rome, freed Mussolini and brought him to the German-occupied area to establish a new pro-Axis regime known as the Italian Social Republic.

== Correspondences between Pius XII and Roosevelt ==
On May 18, 1943 (three months before the German Army occupied the city), Pius XII wrote to Roosevelt asking that Rome "be spared as far as possible further pain and devastation, and their many treasured shrines… from irreparable ruin."

On June 16, 1943, Roosevelt replied:

Attacks against Italy are limited, to the extent humanly possible, to military objectives. We have not and will not make warfare on civilians or against nonmilitary objectives. In the event it should be found necessary for Allied planes to operate over Rome, our aviators are thoroughly informed as to the location of the Vatican and have been specifically instructed to prevent bombs from falling within Vatican City.

The bombing of Rome was controversial, and General Henry H. Arnold described Vatican City as a "hot potato" because of the importance of Catholics in the U.S. Armed Forces. British public opinion, however, was more aligned towards the bombing of the city, due to the participation of Italian planes in The Blitz over London. H.G. Wells was a particularly vocal proponent of doing so.

== Notable raids ==
Date	Description
July 19, 1943	On July 19, 1943, during Operation Crosspoint, Rome was bombed by 521 Allied planes. Between 11 a.m. and 12 noon, 150 Allied B-17 Flying Fortresses attacked the San Lorenzo freight yard and steel factory. In the afternoon, the second target was the Littorio marshalling yard on the northern side of Rome. The third target was the Ciampino Airport, on the south-east side of Rome. The raid caused thousands of civilian casualties (estimates range between 1,600 and 3,200 victims). After the raid, Pius XII, along with Msgr. Montini (the future Pope Paul VI), travelled to the Basilica of Saint Lawrence outside the Walls, which had been badly damaged, and distributed 2 million lire to the crowds.
August 13, 1943	310 Allied bombers attacked the city, targeting San Lorenzo and Littorio airfield. The surrounding urban districts were also badly hit, and 502 civilians were killed.
September 17, 1943	55 USAAF bombers attacked the Ciampino Airport.
September 18, 1943	Ciampino was attacked again, this time by 35 bombers.
October 23, 1943	73 RAF bombers attacked the Guidonia Air Base.
November 22, 1943	Ciampino was bombed by 39 RAF aircraft.
November 28, 1943	Ciampino was bombed by 55 RAF aircraft.
December 28, 1943	Ciampino and Guidonia were bombed by the 12th USAF.
January 13, 1944	USAF bombers attacked the Guidonia and Centocelle airfields.
January 19, 1944	147 USAF bombers attacked the Guidonia and Centocelle airfields, but the surrounding city was also hit.
January 20, 1944	197 USAF bombers attacked the Guidonia and Centocelle airfields, but the surrounding city was also hit.
March 3, 1944	206 USAF bombers attacked the Tiburtino, Littorio and Ostiense marshalling yards; these were hit but so were the surrounding urban districts, with 400 civilian deaths.
March 7, 1944	149 USAF bombers bombed the Littorio and Ostiense marshalling yards, hitting both their objectives and the city.
March 10, 1944	The 12th USAF bombed the Littorio and Tiburtino marshalling yards, but bombs fell also on the city, killing 200 civilians.
March 14, 1944	112 USAF bombers attacked the Prenestino marshalling yard; the objective was hit, but the surrounding districts also suffered damage, with 150 civilian casualties.
March 18, 1944	The 12th USAF bombed Rome, causing 100 civilian casualties. This was the last major air raid over Rome.

== Bombing of Vatican City ==
Map of Vatican City showing the buildings of the Governatorate, the Tribunal, and the Archpriest, and the railway station, which were damaged on 5 November 1943. The mosaic workshop, which received a direct hit, is positioned between the railway station and the residence of the archpriest.

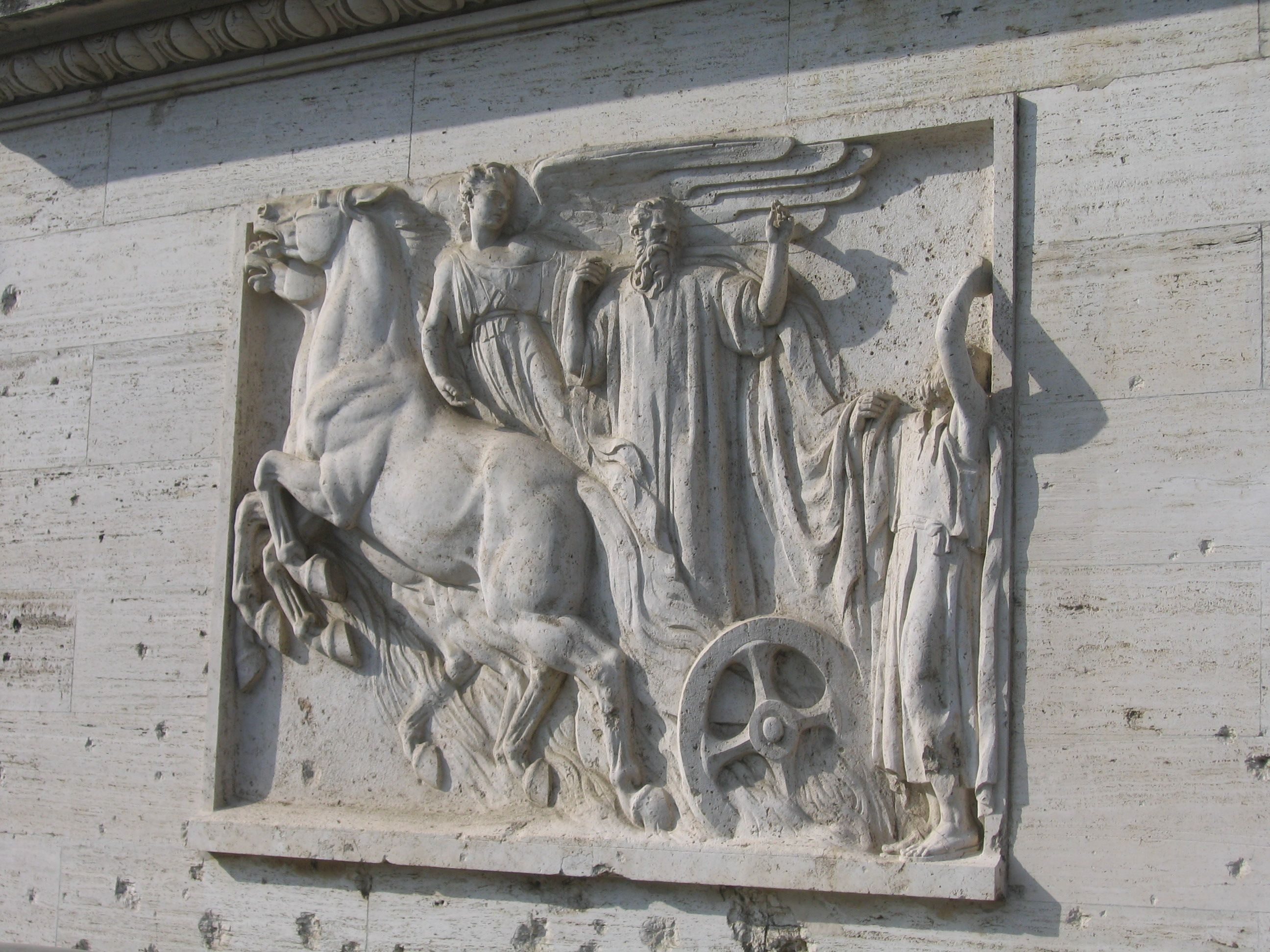
Effects of shrapnel on a wall of the Vatican City railway station, which is adorned with a sculpture of Elijah in his fiery chariot

Vatican City maintained an official policy of neutrality during the war. Both Allied and Axis bombers made some effort not to attack the Vatican when bombing Rome. However, Vatican City was bombed on at least two occasions during the war, once on November 5, 1943, and once on March 1, 1944. There are varying accounts regarding which side was responsible for both incidents. Both Vatican bombings occurred while Rome was under German occupation.

=== Bombing of 5 November 1943 ===
On November 5, 1943, a single plane dropped four bombs on the Vatican, destroying a mosaic studio near the Vatican railway station and breaking the windows of the high cupola of St. Peter's, and nearly destroying Vatican Radio. There were no fatalities.

==== Account by Tardini ====
An eyewitness account written in 1944 by Monsignor Domenico Tardini, an Italian priest and later a cardinal, states:

The (first) bombing of the Vatican occurred on 5 November 1943 at 20:10. It was a very clear and cloudless evening. The moon made visibility excellent. For over half an hour an aeroplane was heard circling insistently over Rome and especially the Vatican. At about 8:10, while an Allied squadron passed over the Vatican, the aeroplane that until then had been circling over Rome dropped four bombs and flew away. The bombs fell in the Vatican Gardens: the first near the receiving Radio, another near the Government building, a third on the mosaics workshop, the fourth near the building of the Cardinal Archpriest. If they had fallen a very few metres off, they would have hit the Radio, the Government building, that of the Tribunals (where the diplomats were housed), and that of the Archpriest. They caused considerable damage, for all the windows were blown to pieces. There were no human casualties.

He continued:

General opinion, and general indignation, blamed the Germans and, perhaps more, the Republican Fascists. The latter view was reinforced by notes about a telephone conversation of Barracu (Undersecretary for Home Affairs) that a telephone operator (with whom I am not acquainted) gave to the Holy Father. However, some months later, Monsignor Montini received from Monsignor Carroll, an American of the Secretariat of State, who was in Algiers to organize an information service for soldiers and civilians, a letter in which it was stated clearly that the bombs had been dropped by an American. 5 November is for England, Father Hughes told me, an anti-Pope day. When Monsignor Carroll came to Rome in June 1944, he answered a question of mine by telling me that the American airman was supposed to have acted either to make a name for himself or out of wickedness. Monsignor Carroll did not know whether the delinquent had been punished. Perhaps we will know, when the war is over, what really happened.

==== Statement by Carroll ====
The message from Carroll of which Tardini wrote as being addressed to Montini was in reality addressed to Luigi Maglione, Cardinal Secretary of State. It read:

In a conversation with the American Chief of Staff during the past week I was informed very confidentially that they feel that the bombing of the Vatican is probably attributable to an American pilot who lost his way; in fact, another American pilot reported seeing an Allied plane dropping its load on the Vatican. The General expressed his sincere regret and gave assurances that strict precaution would be taken to avoid a repetition of this incident.

Official assurance that no American plane had in fact dropped bombs on Vatican City was given by the United States authorities.

The German and British authorities gave similar assurances regarding aircraft of their countries. Aware that the bombs used were British, the British pointed out that this proved nothing as they could have been taken from captured ordnance, and used for precisely that purpose.

==== Publications in the 21st century ====
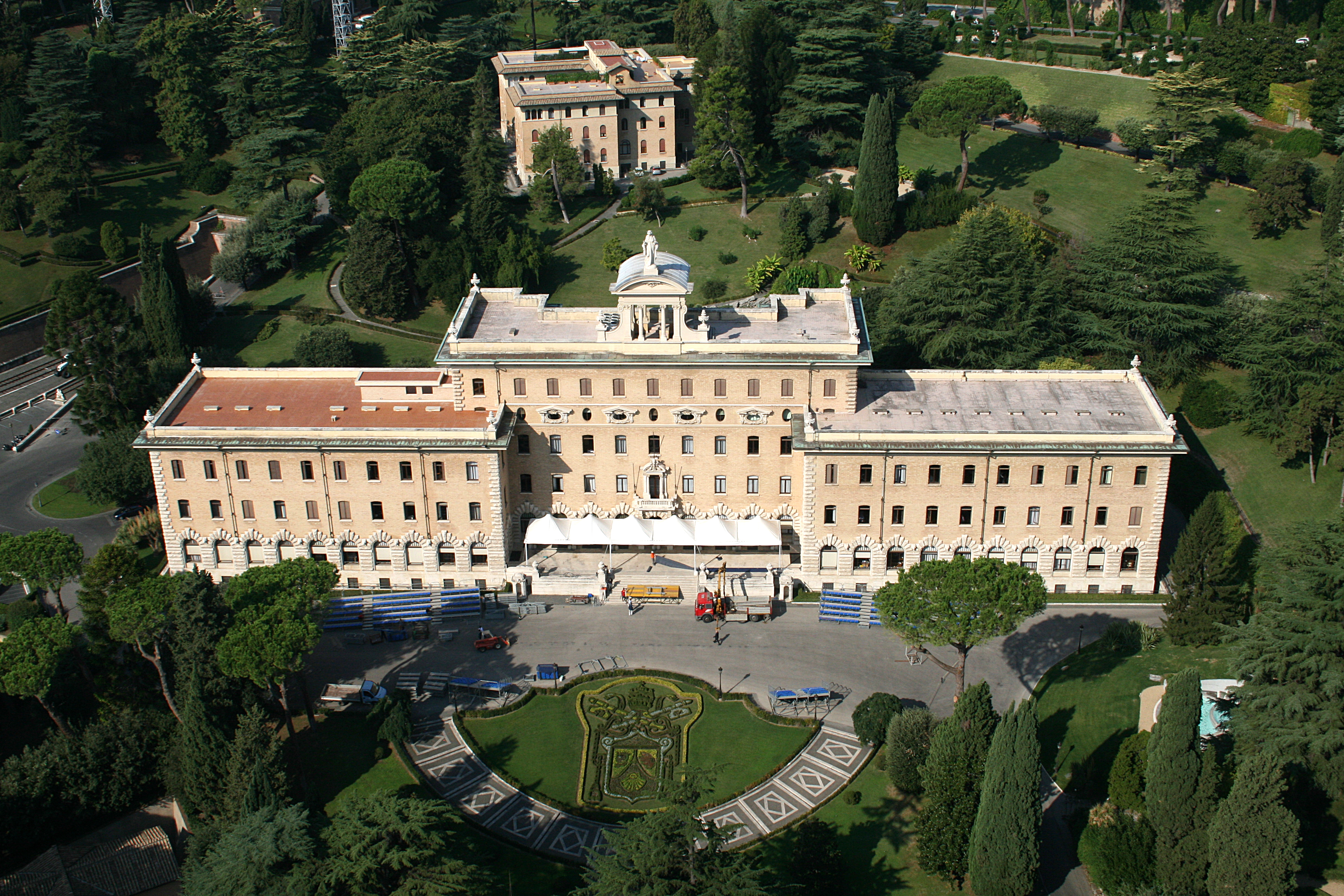
Palace of the Governatorate of Vatican City State, one of the buildings damaged by the 5 November 1943 bombing

Augusto Ferrara's 2010 book 1943 Bombe sul Vaticano, declares that the attack was orchestrated by leading Italian Fascist politician and anti-clericalist Roberto Farinacci. The aim was to knock out Vatican Radio, which was suspected of sending coded messages to the Allies. The aircraft that delivered the bombs was a SIAI Marchetti S.M.79, a three-engined Italian medium bomber known as the "Sparviero", which had taken off from Viterbo, some 80 kilometres north of Rome.

One piece of evidence on which Ferrara bases his account of the responsibility of Farinacci was a telephone call from a priest called Giuseppe to the Jesuit Pietro Tacchi Venturi. In fact, a note on page 705 of volume 7 of the Actes et documents du Saint Siège relatifs à la seconde guerre mondiale cites Eitel Friederich Moellhausen as stating that rumours in Rome immediately blamed Farinacci and spoke of Viterbo as the base from which the plane must have flown. Tardini's note quoted above also says that, from the start, it was the general opinion that the Italian Republican Fascists were to blame, a view that Tardini himself discounted on the basis of the information given by Monsignor Carroll. Owen Chadwick also reported that Farinacci was rumoured in Rome to have arranged the raid from the Viterbo airfield, something that Farinacci, who was killed together with Mussolini on 28 April 1945, never denied, but Chadwick considered the story "very unlikely".

In Ferrara's account, five bombs were dropped, of which one did not explode. According to the Actes et documents du Saint Siège relatifs à la seconde guerre mondiale, the report of an examination carried out by Vatican authorities after the event spoke only of fragments that made it difficult to determine whether the high-explosive bombs, which had been of 100–150 kg weight and produced small craters over a wide range, were of British, German or Italian manufacture.

The 2007 book Venti angeli sopra Roma by Cesare De Simone speaks of a supposed admission of responsibility by the RAF in the postwar period.

The article by Raffaele Alessandrini on the 10–11 January 2011 issue of the Vatican newspaper L'Osservatore Romano says that the identity of those responsible has still not been completely clarified.

However, research published in 2016 proposes a more definitive identification of the bomber and presents an intriguing account of the motive behind it. Throughout 1943 the Italian Intelligence Service routinely intercepted and recorded telephone conversations to and from the Vatican. On November 8, 1943 Ugo Guspini, one of the intelligence agents involved, recorded the conversation between Fr. Giuseppe and the Jesuit Pietro Tacchi Venturi. In this verbatim account Fr. Giuseppe informed the Jesuit that he had just returned from the Viterbo Air Force base, north of Rome, where he had been told by someone who was present throughout the entire operation that the bombing was undertaken by Roberto Farinacci and a Roman pilot in an Italian Savoia-Marchetti aircraft with five bombs on board destined to knock out the Vatican Radio station because Farinacci believed it was transmitting military information to the Allies. This confirms the account given by Augusto Ferrara above and is further corroborated by Eitel Möllhausen, at the time chargé d'affaires at the German Embassy, Rome, who in his post-war memoir claimed that Farinacci was responsible and that Farinacci never denied it.

The report by Monsignor Walter S. Carroll (see above), who had just returned from Allied headquarters in Algeria, that he had been informed "very confidentially" that the bombing was due to an American pilot who had lost his way and that another American pilot had reported seeing an Allied plane dropping its load on the Vatican, correctly represented opinion at Allied headquarters, Algeria, at the time. On November 8, 1943, Harold Macmillan, the then resident British Minister in Algiers, informed the British Foreign Office in a "Most Secret" telegram: "I think we probably did bomb the Vatican." On the night in question one of seven British Boston bombers, which had been in operation just north of Rome at the time the Vatican was bombed, developed engine trouble and dropped its bombs through clouds over an unknown location in order to lighten its load and return to base. These it was thought must have been the bombs which fell on the Vatican. However, at the Foreign Office it was noted that it had been a clear and cloudless night over Rome when the Vatican was bombed and a subsequent confidential Air Ministry investigation into the incident established that the impaired Boston had actually dropped its bombs over Arce, some fifty miles southeast of Rome, and that neither it nor any other British aircraft in operation that night was responsible. The American pilot who witnessed the bombing probably saw the Savoia-Marchetti aircraft which, from a distance, is not dissimilar to the Martin Baltimore light bomber frequently used over Italy, and mistook it for an Allied aircraft.

=== Bombing of 1 March 1944 ===
There is less debate about the identity of the British plane that dropped bombs on the edge of Vatican City on 1 March 1944 as this was explicitly acknowledged, at least in private, by the British Air Ministry as an accidental bombing when one of its aircraft on a bombing raid over Rome dropped six bombs too close to the Vatican wall. The bombing, which affected only the outer margin of the city, was on 1 March 1944 and killed one person and injured another. A workman who was in the open was killed and a Dutch Augustinian in the College of Saint Monica was injured. The low-yield bombs also caused damage to the Palace of the Holy Office, to the Oratory of Saint Peter, and to the Pontifical Urbanian College on the nearby Janiculum Hill. Claims persist, nevertheless, that this was an Italian plane which was seen to strike an obstacle, perhaps a tree on the Janiculum, after which it jettisoned its bombs, but crashed after hitting a house on Via del Gelsomino with its wing killing an elderly woman who lived inside. The Italian authorities quickly removed the wreckage and the dead pilot.

Monsignor Giulio Barbetta, who recounts his experience of this bombing, says that, while almost all the windows of the Holy Office building were shattered, the glass covering an image of Our Lady between it and the entrance to the Oratory of Saint Peter remained intact and the oratory itself suffered no more than the effects of shrapnel against its wall. This led to the placing of sculptures of two shield-bearing angels to right and left of the image above an inscription that states: AB ANGELIS DEFENSA KAL. MART. A.D. MCMXLIV (Protected by angels, 1 March 1944 AD).

== See also ==
- Vatican City in World War II
