= Kazimierz Papée =

Polish diplomat

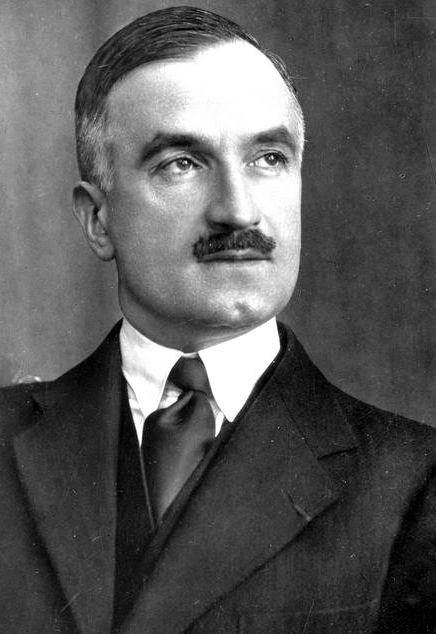
Kazimierz Papée

Kazimierz Papée (sometimes Anglicized Casimir, January 10, 1889 – January 19, 1979) was the ambassador from Poland to the Holy See from 1939 to 1958, during and after World War II. Due to the Nazi invasion of Poland months after Papée's appointment, Papée represented the Polish government-in-exile for the remainder of Pope Pius XII's papacy, before being dismissed by his successor, Pope John XXIII.

== Early life ==
Kazimierz Papée was born January 10, 1889, in Lwów. His father Fryderyk was a renowned historian employed by the Ossolineum, his mother Wladyslawa was daughter of poet Wladyslaw Anczyc. In 1905, the family moved to Kraków, where Fryderyk Papée got a job at the library of the Jagiellonian University. Kazimierz graduated from law department of the Jagiellonian University, later receiving his PhD. During World War I, he served in the Polish Legions (1915–1916), and after the war, when Poland regained independence, he became a diplomat, working in Ministry of Foreign Affairs.

On April 1, 1920, Kazimierz Papée took a job in Polish legation in The Hague, and two years later he was transferred to Berlin. In 1923, after returning to Poland, Papée became a deputy to the Director of the Political Department. On January 14, 1924, he took the post of chargé d'affaires of the Polish legation in Copenhagen, where he remained until December 1, 1924. The next four years Papée spent in Poland, working for the Ministry of Foreign Affairs. On January 1, 1928, he became director of the consular office of the Polish legation in Ankara. In the first half of 1929, he worked in the Polish legation in Tallinn, and on July 16, 1929, he became general consul of Poland in Königsberg.

== Polish High Commissioner of Danzig ==
Papée became the "Polish High Commissioner of Danzig" on February 12, 1932; the "nomination was taken to mean that Poland intended to take a stronger attitude toward the Free City". Papée thus served as Poland's diplomatic representative to the Free City of Danzig, in which role he dealt with the Polish boycott of the city. As envoy, Papée's main demand was that the Free City turn over its customs revenue to Poland. Papée negotiated primarily with Arthur Greiser, the President of the Danzig Senate. The dispute and the ensuing reprisals became known as the "customs war". Papée was ultimately successful in obtaining the concession from Danzig.

Papée combatted Nazi efforts to eliminate the League of Nations role in the governance of the Free City. Papée persuaded Greiser not to enforce various decrees designed to suppress the Danzig Opposition. Papée continued to convey the protests of Colonel Józef Beck to Greiser.

== Envoy in Prague ==
In 1938, Papée was relocated to Prague as envoy to Czechoslovakia, siding with the Czechs against Germany in the Sudetenland crisis. Papée held the diplomatic rank of "Minister". Polish-Czech tension was raised as well, and Papée soon lodged protests against Czech troop movements near the Polish border, and radio propaganda.

== Ambassador to the Holy See ==
Papée was appointed ambassador to the Holy See on June 23, 1939. The post had lain vacant since the 1937 death of Władysław Skrzyński. Papée attended to Pope Pius XII's attempts to mediate the disputes between Germany and Poland.

Papée unsuccessfully pressured Pius XII to more strongly speak out against the situation in occupied Poland throughout the war. For example, Papée met with Pius XII on September 30, 1940—along with Cardinal August Hlond, the primate of Poland, and Wladimir Ledóchowski, the Superior General of the Jesuits—but all three left disappointed when Pius XII declined to condemn the double invasion of Poland because he did not want the Vatican "to become a platform for Polish objections against Germany". However, Pius XII's June 3, 1941, and May 21, 1943, meetings with Papée were perceived as de facto recognition of the Polish government-in-exile. Papée never accepted Pius XII's proposal to accept the Nazi annexation of a portion of Poland.

Later, in May 1942, he complained to Cardinal Secretary of State Luigi Maglione that Pius XII had not condemned the recent wave of terror in Poland. When Maglione replied that it was impossible to document such atrocities, Papée retorted "there was sufficient proof and, besides, when something becomes notorious, proof is not required". Papée reported after the war: "I remember when I came to see the Holy Father for [...] perhaps the tenth time in 1944; he was angry. When he saw me as I entered the room and stood at the door awaiting permission to approach, he raised both his arms in a gesture of exasperation. 'I have listened again and again to your representations about Our unhappy children in Poland. Must I be given the same story yet again?'". Papée pressured Pius XII to speak out not only against the persecution of Poles, but also against The Holocaust.

Papée was present in a 1944 audience with Polish officers where Pius XII urged Poland to avoid retribution against Germany or Russia. By 1953, Papée was entitled by virtue of seniority to the title of dean of the diplomatic corps, but had not acted as dean for years due to his continuing representation of the government-in-exile, not Communist Poland. Pope John XXIII revoked Papée's accreditation as ambassador in December 1958, in a move that somewhat improved relations between the Vatican and the People's Republic of Poland. Also de-recognized was Stanislovas Girdvainis, the ambassador of the Lithuanian government-in-exile.

== Memoir ==
After the war, Papée published Pius XII i Polska (Pius XII and Poland, 1954), documenting the policies of Pius XII vis-a-vis Poland from 1939 to 1949. He wrote that when he pleaded with Pius XII to denounce or condemn the mass killing centers of Auschwitz and Birkenau, he received only a generic reply: "The Vatican is always ready to alleviate all misery due to war" (p. 94). Papée wrote memos to the Pope notifying him specifically about topics such as the liquidation of the Warsaw Ghetto, mass executions in specialized killing centers, and mass deportations of Jews. He died on January 19, 1979, in Rome.

Dr. Dariusz Libionka's analysis of Papée's attempts to get Pius XII to act or speak out against the Holocaust in Poland is bluntly titled "Against a Brick Wall".
