= Pius Wars =

Debates over Pope Pius XII 's actions during the Holocaust

The Pius War (or Pius Wars) refer to debates over the legacy of Pope Pius XII and his actions during the Holocaust. The phrase was first coined in a 2004 book of the same name.

== World War II ==
Pius XII was crowned Pope of the Catholic Church on 2 March 1939, and was thus leader of the Church and the sovereign of Vatican City, which maintained an official policy of neutrality, during all of World War II. During Pius's reign, and for several years after his death in 1958, he was praised by some political leaders, civilians, and members of the press. However, Pius's generalized public statements about genocide while most of Europe's Jews were being killed off never specifically mentioned Jewry and were considered inadequate by the Allies and by the Polish government-in-exile.

== 1960s ==
In 1963, a play entitled The Deputy which portrayed Pius XII as a sycophantic aide to Hitler, was produced on the German stage. This event began the first serious public discussion of Pius's record.

"Pius Wars" books and articles published during the 1960s include:

The Deputy: A Christian Tragedy” (original title: “Der Stellvertreter. Ein christliches Trauerspiel") signaled the beginnings of the Pius Wars. It was first staged in Germany in 1963, but was subsequently translated into multiple languages, staged in several countries, and given much publicity. Its author, Rolf Hochhuth, also published a book based on the play, which purported to give evidence that his portrayal of the Pope was accurate. The controversy the play raised received much attention for several years, but became muted for a time after Hochhuth published a second play, The Soldiers, also denigrating Winston Churchill, which was roundly condemned.

Irish Catholic journalist Desmond Fisher attempted to rebut Hochhuth's charges in Pope Pius XII and the Jews: An Answer to Hochhuth’s Play, Der Stellvertreter, a pamphlet also published in 1963, when the play was first staged.

An American professor of political science, Guenter Lewy, published The Catholic Church and Nazi Germany in 1964, soon after “The Deputy” was staged but said in his preface that research for the book began in 1960. Lewy relied primarily on “large quantities of German State and Party documents and the opening of some Church archives". He opined that the "often fierce reaction to Hochhuth's play" was due to its having touched a "raw nerve" and says that the relationship between the Catholic Church and Nazi Germany is "a subject which for many years has been obscured by what may justifiably be called an extensive mythology."

Lewy used Nazi Party, German State, and German Catholic diocesan archives that were seized by the Allies to reconstruct Nazi-Vatican relations prior to and during World War II.

In 1965 Carlo Falconi attempted to support Hochhuth's thesis in a more scholarly way, with Il Silenzio di Pio XII. (The Silence of Pius XII, an English translation, was published in 1970.) In 1967, Falconi published The Popes of the Twentieth Century, in which he again criticized Pius for "failing to speak out" – "[Pius XII] was also guilty of inadmissable silence about the millions of civilian victims of Nazism – Jews, Poles, Serbs, Russians, gypsies, and others."

In 1966 Saul Friedländer, an Israeli historian, used primary documents to support Hochhuth's thesis in Pius XII and the Third Reich: A Documentation. (The book was first published in 1964, in Paris, under the title, Pie XII et le IIIe Reich, Documents.) Friedländer suggested the Vatican should open its record archives, and in 1964, Pope Paul VI commissioned a group of Jesuit scholars to edit and publish the Vatican's records. These were published in eleven volumes between 1965 and 1981.

In Three Popes and the Jews, Israeli journalist and former DELASEM member Pinchas Lapide in 1967 defended Pius, claiming that the Pope, through the Catholic hierarchy, was responsible for saving from 700,000 to 860,000 Jewish lives. The passage in his book in which Lapide presents and explains how he arrived at this figure reads as follows. (The passage doesn't include any references or citations.)

The Catholic Church, under the pontificate of Pius XII was instrumental in saving at least 700,000, but probably as many as 860,000, Jews from certain death at Nazi hands. (The total number of Jews who survived Hitler in ex-Nazi-occupied Europe, excluding Russia, thanks, in part at least, to Christian help, is approximately 945,000. To these must be added the 85,000-odd whom Christians helped escape during the war to Turkey, Spain, Portugal, Andorra and Latin America. Of the resultant total, exceeding one million Jewish survivors, I deducted all reasonable claims of rescue made by the Protestant Churches - mainly in France, Italy, Hungary, Finland, Denmark and Norway; the Eastern Churches - mainly in Roumania, Bulgaria and Greece - as well as those saved by Communist, self-declared agnostics and other non-Christian Gentiles. The final number of Jewish lives in whose rescue the Catholic Church had been instrumental is thus at least 700,000 souls, but in all probability is much closer to the maximum of 860,000.)

In Death in Rome, the first of his books on Pius XII's record in regard to Rome's Jewish population, Robert Katz in 1967 accused the Pope of having had foreknowledge of the Ardeatine Caves massacre.

In Black Sabbath: A Journey Through a Crime Against Humanity, his second book on Pius XII, Katz accused him of failing to protect Rome's Jews, and of having done nothing to prevent the deportation of Jews from the Roman ghetto.

In 1969 University of Lucerne professor of history Victor Conzemius defended Pius XII's record in Pius XII and Nazi Germany in Historical Perspective (Historical Studies: Papers Read before the Irish Conference of Historians, VII) and in many other writings. He called the attacks on Pius "spurious."

== 1970s and 1980s ==
British historian Anthony Rhodes defended both Pius XI and Pius XII in his 1973 book titled The Vatican in the Age of the Dictators, 1922 – 1945, asserting that the Popes' primary concern was pastoral.

According to journalist William Doino, Jr., "By the late 1960s, the attack on Pius XII seemed to have been turned back with the discrediting of The Deputy. One of the few books to appear in the next generation of scholarship was John F. Morley's Vatican Diplomacy and the Jews During the Holocaust, 1939 – 1943. Father Morley's 1980 book was one of the first to take into account the Vatican's Actes et Documents (though his book ends with the events of 1943 and was published before the last two volumes of the Actes were available). Morley used these and other primary Vatican documents to find fault with the Vatican for not confronting the Nazis in regards to the persecution of the Jews. He also blames the Vatican for primarily concentrating on helping Jews who had been baptized into the Catholic Church.

At the end of his book, Morley writes:

It must be concluded that Vatican diplomacy failed the Jews during the Holocaust by not doing all that it was possible for it to do on their behalf. It also failed itself because in neglecting the needs of the Jews, and pursuing a goal of reserve rather than humanitarian concern, it betrayed the ideals that it had set for itself. The nuncios, the secretary of state, and, most of all, the Pope share the responsibility for this dual failure.

Father Michael O'Carroll used Vatican archival documents, Nuremberg Trial transcripts, and other primary documents to argue against Father Morley's Vatican Diplomacy in another 1980 book, Pius XII: Greatness Dishonored – A Documented Study.

== 1990s ==
After Father Morley's book and the response to it, the controversy died down until 1997, when ex-priest James Carroll wrote an article for The New Yorker titled The Silence, which once again brought up the question of Pius’s “silence.” The article was followed by a large number of anti-Pius articles and books as well as a flurry of rebuttals. Carroll drew parallels in his article between the reign of Pope John Paul II and that of Pius XII. He claimed that, despite John Paul's attempts, Catholic-Jewish relations would never improve until the Church admitted that Pius XII did wrong in not speaking out against the Nazi regime. The reason, he said, that the Church refused to admit its wrongdoing was that it could not break the tenet of papal infallibility.

A Catholic sister of the order Religious Teachers Filippini, Dr. Margherita Marchione collected oral histories from Italian Jews and Catholics to make the case that in her 1997 Yours Is a Precious Witness: Memoirs of Jews and Catholics in Wartime Italy that "No longer can one speak of [Pius XII's] silence.... His was a language of action.

Father Pierre Blet, one of the four Jesuit priests who edited the Vatican's multi-volume Actes et Documents (purporting to contain the Vatican's most salient wartime documents), in 1999 wrote Pius XII and the Second World War According to the Archives of the Vatican to summarize the findings of the Actes. His opinion was that Pius XII would be vindicated once the Vatican Archives were fully opened (which they were in 2020).

In Hitler’s Pope, English journalist and ex-Catholic seminarian John Cornwell made the case that Pius aided Hitler's rise to power by encouraging German Catholic Center Party and German Catholic Bishops to support him. The book was both praised and condemned. Kenneth L. Woodward, then religion editor at Newsweek and later a writer in residence at University of Chicago's Lumen Christi Institute, called the book "a classic example of what happens with an ill-equipped journalist assumes the air of sober scholarship.... Most of his sources are secondary and written by Pacelli's harshest critics. Errors of fact and ignorance of context appear on almost every page.... This is bogus scholarship, filled with nonexistent secrets, aimed to shock." Columbia University History Professor V.R. Berghahn in The New York Times, by contrast, wrote, "By combining the painstaking research of other scholars with his own new documentation on Pius's knowledge and behavior during World War II, John Cornwell, a British journalist and research associate of Jesus College, Cambridge, makes a case in ''Hitler's Pope' that is very difficult to refute." In a 2004 interview, Cornwell said that “Pius XII had so little scope of action that it is impossible to judge the motives for his silence during the war." Four years later, on the other hand, in a new preface to his book, he wrote that "I have found no reason to alter my verdict on Pius XII's scandalous silence on the known facts of the Holocaust in 1942 or his paltry Christmas broadcast of that year, [but] information revealed subsequent to the publication of Hitler's Pope has encouraged me to qualify my opinion on one point regarding Pacelli's inaction following the roundup of Jews from the Roman ghetto in early September 1943. While his failure to act seemed to me undeniably culpable at the time of writing the book, I am now inclined to believe, in the light of new evidence about Hitler's plan to invade the Vatican and kidnap Pius, that the circumstances and the conflicting pressures were sufficiently complex to allow Pacelli a measure of benefit of the doubt." (Other historians have cast substantial doubt on the plausibility of the alleged plot to kidnap Pius.)

== 2000s ==
Liberal Catholic Garry Wills denigrated Pius XII and other Popes in Papal Sin: Structures of Deceit, a 2000 argument against papal power and in favor of Church reform.

In Hitler, the War, and the Pope Catholic University of Mississippi law professor Ronald J. Rychlak in 2000 compiled "an enormous amount of evidence" in defense of Pius XII's wartime record. "Since Rychlak's critique appeared, no historian has taken Cornwell's book seriously."

Also in 2000, Michael Phayer's The Catholic Church and the Holocaust, 1930 – 1965 suggested, among other charges, that it was no accident that Pius's detractors waited until after his death to speak out, and pointed out that all those who did were post-war appointees. He also opined that Pius's reputation began to wane, not in 1963, but after a question about his refusal to speak publicly about the Holocaust came up during the Eichmann Trial.

In a 2001 historical review of Jewish-Christian relations, ex-priest James Carroll regretted lost possibilities for the avoidance of schism. The book, Constantine's Sword, culminated in an indictment of Pius XII's wartime record. Liberal Catholics endorsed the book.

Brown University professor of ethnography and history David I. Kertzer's website described his 2001 book, The Popes Against the Jews: The Vatican's Role in the Rise of Modern Anti-Semitism, as "A groundbreaking historical study based on documents previously locked in the Vatican’s secret archives" and adds that "the book is full of shocking revelations" regarding the actions not only of Pius XII but of many other antisemitic Popes throughout history.

Jewish-American professor of history Susan Zuccotti argued in her 2002 book Under His Very Windows that Pius XII did not even try to save the Roman Jews during the Razzia of 1943, even though it happened "under his very windows." The book won a National Jewish Book Award for works on Jewish-Christian relations. Zuccotti also wrote that the lack of evidence in the form of written orders from the Pope, directing his followers to save Jews, indicates that no such orders were ever given. Critics contend that such orders would have been destroyed after reading.

Also in 2002, Saint Louis University professor of history José M. Sánchez wrote Pope Pius XII and the Holocaust: Understanding the Controversy, intended to be a survey of then-current scholarship on Pius XII and the Holocaust. William Doino, Jr., nonetheless called it "a subtle but highly effective defense of Pius XII."

In 2002 as well, Daniel Jonah Goldhagen, then an associate professor at Harvard University, published A Moral Reckoning: The Role of the Catholic Church in the Holocaust and Its Unfinished Duty of Repair, whose title speaks for itself. In his New York Times review, British author and historian Geoffrey Wheatcroft, while faulting the book in several respects, basically concurred with its harsh view of Pius and the church he led. "And yet by any standards the behavior of the Catholic Church was deeply dismaying. The pope's record was bad enough; he pointedly refused to condemn the murder of the Jews, about which he was well informed, until he tried to cover his tracks when Germany had plainly lost the war. Worse was the conduct of Catholic priests and prelates in many countries where the Catholic Church -- or very many of its clergy and laity -- warmly embraced the New Order. In Croatia, massacres of Serbs and Jews were led by Franciscans (of all gentle names), and Jews were sent to their deaths in Slovakia by a Nazi client state ruled by a Roman Catholic prelate, Monsignor Josef Tiso, subsequently executed as a war criminal. It would be hard to argue with Goldhagen if he had simply recounted this history, or even if he had stopped after claiming that moral restitution by the Catholic Church is still needed."

Catholic Joseph Bottum and Jewish Rabbi David G. Dalin edited The Pius War: Responses to the Critics of Pius XII, a collection of essays defending Pius XII and his actions during the years leading up to and including the Second World War. The eleven essays are followed by an annotated bibliography of works on this theme compiled by William Doino, Jr. In the introduction to the book, Joseph Bottum states, "The Pius War is over, more or less.... [I]n the end, the defenders of Pius XII won every major battle. Along the way, they also lost the war."

In 2008, Columbia University Professor of History Istvan Deak wrote, in a summary of his view of Pius, "Fearful of Hitler's wrath, the Pope barely raised his voice against Nazi racism and anticlericalism, and spoke even less about Nazi anti-Semitism. He did not take a stand in defense of the suffering Polish Catholic nation, or of the Christian victims of the Nazi euthanasia program, or of the Jews of his own bishopric in Rome... Pius XII made it his supreme purpose to assure the survival of the Catholic Church in a time of turmoil. In this, he was successful, although it is still not clear just how, when, and by whom that survival was threatened. In providing help to the victims of Nazi persecution, the Pope undertook much less than could have been expected of a person of his exalted position."

== 2010s ==
Catholic priest and Stonehill College professor of history Kevin P. Spicer encapsulated his views on Pius in The Oxford Handbook of Holocaust Studies, published in 2010:

During this tumultuous period, Pius XII's primary concern remained, as always, the care, protection, and continuation of the visible Church, especially in Rome and Vatican City, and its mission to bring salvation to its members (Spicer 2004; Besier 2007: 199; Phayer 2008). Unfortunately, the care and concern of those who were not members of the Catholic Church was secondary. Similarly, the visible institution itself, which Pius XII likened to “the mystical Body of Christ,” and the freedom of this institution to continue its otherworldly mission to aid Catholics to salvation through the administration of the sacraments also took precedence over the life and well‐being of any individual Catholic. This posture may account for the silence of the official Church about the thousands of priests and religious who were sent to concentration camps, where many of them perished.

Also in 2010, John Pawlikowski, a Catholic priest, Catholic Theological Union professor of social ethics and United States Holocaust Memorial Council member, said, "We know that Pius did some things that were good, but they tended to come rather late, they were mostly behind the scenes and were relatively minor gestures." In 2015, American historian Mark Riebling told the story of the Vatican's World War II spy network in Church of Spies:

"History has accused wartime pontiff Pius the Twelfth of complicity in the Holocaust and dubbed him 'Hitler's Pope.' But a key part of the story has remained untold. Pius... skimmed from church charities to pay covert couriers.... He sent birthday cards to Hitler – while secretly plotting to kill him.... Gun-toting Jesuits stole blueprints to Hitler's homes. A Catholic book publisher flew a sports plane over the Alps with secrets filched from the leader of Hitler's bodyguard. The keeper of the Vatican crypt ran a spy ring that betrayed German war plans and wounded Hitler in a briefcase bombing.... [This] secret war muted [Pius's] public response to Nazi crimes. Fearing that overt protest would impede his covert actions, he never spoke the 'fiery words' he wanted."

Belgian professor Johan Ickx wrote Le Bureau: Les Juifs de Pie XII ("The Office: The Jews of Pius XII"), one of the first books based on primary sources from the Vatican's March 2, 2020, opening of the Pius XII Archives (often referred to as the Secret Archives). "The book, published in September (2020) but so far only in French, reveals correspondence with U.S. President Franklin Roosevelt to prevent the escalation of the war, Pius' support for an escape route to help the most persecuted, diplomatic attempts to influence the policing of the Third Reich, the rejection of Marshal Pétain's anti-racial laws, an emergency organization of baptisms to save thousands of Jews from deportation, and the condemnation of priests sympathetic to the Nazis in Slovakia."

== 2020s ==
Brown University professor David I. Kertzer, in what he called the first full account of Pius's activities during WWII to make use of the Vatican archives that had been opened in 2020, presented a highly critical view of Pius in his 2022 book The Pope at War: The Secret History of Pius XII, Mussolini, and Hitler, whose final chapter is titled "The Silence of the Pope." Kertzer wrote, about the emergence of a school of thought defending Pius, "At the center of this new, well-scrubbed historical narrative stands Pius XII, presented as the heroic champion of the oppressed. Ambiguous phrases buried amid thousands of words of baroque oratory have come to be heralded as clear denunciations of the Nazi extermination of Europe's Jews. All the efforts the pope made to avoid antagonizing Hitler and Mussolini are wiped from view. His role as primate of the Italian church, presiding over a clergy that was actively supporting the Axis war, is likewise forgotten. Only examples of those brave priests who stood up to the Fascists can be discussed. Erased from memory are the pope's regular assurances to the Duce that he need only inform him of anti-Fascist priests, and he would have them silenced."

== See also ==
- Pope Pius XII and the Holocaust
- Index of Vatican City-related articles
