= Pope Pius XII and the Holocaust =

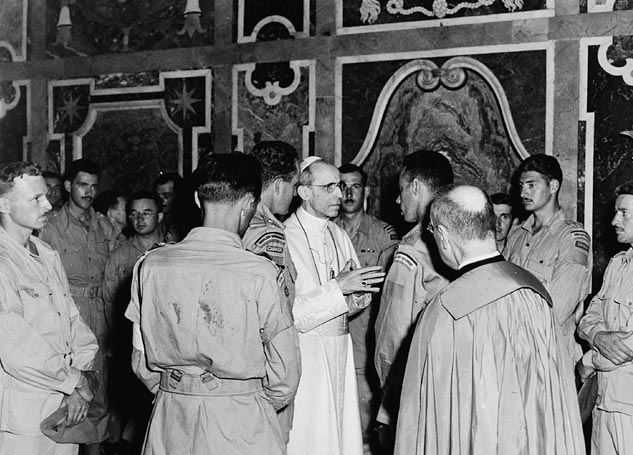
Members of the Canadian Royal 22nd Regiment in audience with Pope Pius XII, following the 1944 Liberation of Rome

The papacy of Pius XII (Eugenio Pacelli) began on 2 March 1939 and continued to 9 October 1958, covering the period of the Second World War and the Holocaust, during which millions of Jews were murdered by Adolf Hitler's Nazi Germany and its collaborators. Before becoming pope, Cardinal Pacelli was a Vatican diplomat in Germany and then Vatican Secretary of State.

His role during the Nazi period has been closely scrutinised and criticised. His supporters state that Pius employed diplomacy to aid the victims of the Nazis during the war and directed his Church to provide discreet aid to Jews and others, thereby saving hundreds of thousands of lives. They also state that the Nazis viewed Pius as an Allied sympathizer who failed to honor his policy of Vatican neutrality. Pius maintained links to the German Resistance and shared intelligence with the Allies of World War II, but also developed alliances with Nazi Germany and Fascist Italy, even arranging secret negotiations with Hitler's envoys. His most overt public condemnation of genocide was considered inadequate by the Allies, and contemporary and post-war critics have asserted that Pius was either overly cautious or did not take sufficient action and that his response to the Holocaust was characterized primarily by silence. Supporters, by contrast, have held that he ordered his Church to provide sanctuary and aid to Jews and thus saved thousands, if not tens or hundreds of thousands, of Jewish lives. They also state that he provided moral and intellectual leadership in opposition to the violent racism of Nazi ideology.

As Secretary of State, Pacelli had been a critic of Nazism and helped draft the 1937 Mit brennender Sorge anti-Nazi encyclical. In Summi Pontificatus (1939), his first papal encyclical, Pius XII expressed dismay at the invasion of Poland (though without ascribing blame); reiterated Catholic teaching in support of universal brotherhood and endorsed resistance against those opposed to the ethical principles of the Ten Commandments and the Sermon on the Mount.

In December 1942, once evidence of the industrial slaughter of the Jews had emerged, Pius's lengthy Christmas address included a brief section voicing concern about the murder of "hundreds of thousands" of "faultless" people because of their "nationality or race". The degree of Pius's efforts to block Nazi deportations of Jews remains a matter of scholarly debate. Upon his death in 1958, Pius was praised emphatically by Israeli Foreign Minister Golda Meir and other world leaders. United States President Dwight D. Eisenhower called him a "foe of tyranny" and a "friend and benefactor to those who were oppressed". However, his insistence on Vatican neutrality and avoidance of directly naming the Nazis as the evildoers of World War II became the foundation for contemporary and later criticisms. Studies of the Vatican Apostolic Archive and international diplomatic correspondence continue.

== Background ==
Two Popes reigned during the Nazi period: Pope Pius XI (1922–1939) and Pope Pius XII (1939–1958). The Holy See strongly criticized Nazism through the late 1920s and throughout the 1930s, with Cardinal Pacelli (later Pope Pius XII) being a particularly outspoken critic. In 1933, the Vatican signed a Concordat, known as the Reichskonkordat, with Germany, hoping to protect the right to practice Catholicism under the Nazi government and government support for Catholic education. The concordat was controversial then and now, and its terms ended up not being kept by Hitler. According to the Encyclopedia Britannica: "From 1933 to 1936 [Pius XI] wrote several protests against the Third Reich, and his attitude toward fascist Italy changed dramatically after Nazi racial policies were introduced into Italy in 1938."

Pius XI offered three encyclicals against the rising tide of European totalitarianism: Non abbiamo bisogno (1931; "We Do Not Need to Acquaint You" – against Italian Fascism); Mit brennender Sorge (1937; "With Deep Anxiety" – against Nazism) and Divini redemptoris (1937; "Divine Redeemer" – against atheist Communism). "Non abbiamo bisogno" directly challenged Italian fascism as a "pagan" movement which "snatches the young from the Church and from Jesus Christ, and which inculcates in its own young people hatred, violence and irreverence". Pius XI also challenged the extremist nationalism of the Action Française movement and antisemitism in the United States.

With Europe on the brink of war, Pius XI died on 10 February 1939 and Pacelli was elected to succeed him as Pope Pius XII. The Nazi Government was the only government not to send a representative to his coronation. Pius lobbied world leaders hard to avoid war and then pursued a policy of cautious diplomacy following the outbreak of the war.

From around 1942, the Nazis had begun to implement their Final Solution – the industrial extermination of Europe's Jews.

== 1933-1937 ==
In July 1933, Pacelli, then Vatican Secretary of State, signed the Reichskonkordat with the Nazi government. The concordat promised freedom to practice Catholicism, but required German bishops to take the following oath:

Before God and on the Holy Gospels I swear and promise, as becomes a bishop, loyalty to the German Reich and to the State (Land) of . . . I swear and promise to honour the legally constituted government and to cause the clergy of my diocese to honour it. With dutiful concern for the welfare and the interests of the German state, in the performance of the ecclesiastical office entrusted to me, I will endeavour to prevent everything injurious which might threaten it.

The concordat further stated, "On Sundays and official holy days, a prayer conforming to the liturgy will be offered at the end of the principal Mass in parish, auxiliary and conventual churches of the German Reich, for the welfare of the German Reich and (German) people." The treaty guaranteed government support for Catholic education, adding, "In religious education, special emphasis will be given to inculcating a patriotic, civic and social sense of duty in the spirit of the Christian faith and the moral code, just as happens in all other subjects." Members of the Catholic clergy were now prohibited from joining political parties. "Due to the special situation existing in Germany, and in view of the safeguards created by the clauses of this concordat of legislation preserving the rights and privileges of the Catholic Church in the Reich and its states, the Holy See will enact regulations to exclude the clergy and members of religious orders from membership in political parties and from working on their behalf."

While this treaty with Nazi Germany was being negotiated, Cardinal Karl Joseph Schulte of Cologne warned that "no concordat could be concluded with such a government.". Bishop Konrad von Preysing circulated a memo to a conference of German bishops saying, "We owe it to the Catholic people to open their eyes to the danger for faith and morals which emerge from National Socialist ideology." Ivone Kirkpatrick, the British minister at the Vatican, described a conversation shortly after the treaty was signed in which Pacelli made efforts "to explain apologetically how it was that he had signed a concordat with such people."

Hitler wrote about the Reichskonkordat, "The conclusion of the concordat seems to me to give sufficient guarantee that the Reich members of the Roman Catholic confession will from now on put themselves without reservation at the service of the new National Socialist state. Commenting on the treaty's public relations benefits, he wrote, "The fact that the Vatican is concluding a treaty with the new Germany means the acknowledgment of the National Socialist state by the Catholic Church. This treaty shows the whole world clearly and unequivocally that the assertion of National Socialism is hostile to religion is a lie." In July 1933, Hitler said, "The concordat gives Germany an opportunity and creates an area of trust that is particularly significant in the developing struggle against international Jewry."

As it turned out, Pacelli filed some 55 complaints about violations of the Reichskonkordat between 1933 and 1939; the historian Martin Gilbert stated that during these years Pacelli repeatedly protested the Nazi "ideology of race". Pacelli also helped Pius XI draft the 1937 Mit brennender Sorge critique of Nazi ideology. Written partly in response to the Nuremberg Laws, the document did not refer to Hitler or the Nazis by name, but condemned racial theories and the mistreatment of people based on race. In 1938, Pacelli publicly restated the words of Pius XI on the incompatibility of Christianity and antisemitism: "It is impossible for a Christian to take part in anti-Semitism. Anti-Semitism is inadmissible; spiritually we are all Semites."

== 1938 ==
=== Hungarian Eucharistic Congress ===
Cardinal Pacelli (the later Pope Pius XII) addressed the International Eucharistic Conference that took place in Budapest, Hungary between 25 and 29 May 1938, and, according to Holocaust scholar and historian Michael Phayer, described the Jews as people "whose lips curse [Christ] and whose hearts reject him even today". Phayer asserts that the timing of the statement, during a period when Hungary was in the process of formulating new antisemitic laws, ran counter to a September 1937 statement of Pius XI urging Catholics to honour their spiritual father Abraham.

Historians Ronald Rychlak and William Doino Jr. have argued that Pacelli was not referring to Jews because Time Magazine did not mention this in its report of the conference. (Note: "Papal Legate Pacelli, without descending from the high religious plane of the Congress, was more specific about Catholicism's enemies 'the lugubrious array of the militant godless, shaking the clenched fist of anti-Christ'. Cried he: 'Where now are Herod and Pilate, Nero and Diocletian, and Julian the Apostate, and all the persecutors of the First Century?' St. Ambrose replies: 'The Christians who have been massacred have won the victory; the vanquished were their persecutors.' Ashes and dust are the enemies of Christianity; ashes and dust are all that they have desired, pursued perhaps even tasted for a short moment of power and terrestrial glory." Time Magazine, 6 June 1938) According to Rychlak and Doino, Pacelli referred to those who were persecuting the Church at that time by doing things like expelling religion and perverting Christianity, and since Jews were not doing this, but Nazi Germany was, the Pope "was clearly equating the Nazis, not Jews, to those who persecuted the Church at earlier times". Gabriel Wilensky, while accepting that Pacelli may indeed have alluded to communists and Nazis earlier in the speech, rejects Rychlak and Doino's interpretation that excludes Jews. He notes that Pacelli's comments were stereotypical of the way the Church once portrayed Jews as Christ-killers and deicides. (See also La Civiltà Cattolica and Nostra aetate.) (Note: A contemporary Hungarian bishop claimed that the holocaust was appropriate punishment for the Jews. See Friedländer (2007), p. 620 for quotation of Archbishop of Eger.)

The influential Vatican journal La Civiltà Cattolica continued to print attacks against Hungarian Jews during this period, asserting that Hungary could only be saved from Jewish influence, which was "disastrous for the religious, moral, and social life of the Hungarian people", if the government forbade them entry to the country. Holocaust historian Paul O'Shea notes, "There is no evidence that he [Pacelli] objected to the anti-Jewish rants of Civiltà Cattolica, which, as Secretary of State to Pius XI, he at least tacitly approved. The Pope or his Secretary of State gave the final fiat for the journal's editorial content. There is no way that Cardinal Pacelli could not have known of the Judeophobia written in Civiltà."

=== Hidden encyclical ===
Walter Bussmann argued that Pacelli, as Cardinal Secretary of State, dissuaded Pope Pius XI – who was nearing death at the time – from condemning Kristallnacht in November 1938, when he was informed of it by the papal nuncio in Berlin. Likewise, a draft, prepared by September 1938, for an encyclical Humani generis unitas ("On the Unity of the Human Race"), was, according to the two publishers of the draft text and other sources, not forwarded to the Vatican by the Jesuit General Wlodimir Ledóchowski. On 28 January 1939, eleven days before the death of Pope Pius XI, a disappointed Gundlach informed the author La Farge: "It cannot continue like this. The text has not been forwarded to the Vatican."

He had talked to the American assistant to Father General, who promised to look into the matter in December 1938 but did not report back. It contained an open and clear condemnation of colonialism, racism, and antisemitism. Some historians have argued that Pacelli learned about its existence only after the death of Pius XI and did not promulgate it as Pope. (Note: On 16 March, four days after coronation, Gundlach informs LaFarge, that the documents were given to Pius XI shortly before his death, but that the new Pope had so far no opportunity to learn about it. (Passelecq & Suchecky (1998), p. 126)) He did, however, use parts of it in his inaugural encyclical Summi Pontificatus, which he titled "On the Unity of Human Society".

== 1939 ==
=== Nazi responses to papal election ===
There are conflicting opinions and information about the Nazis' views of Pacelli at the time he was elected pope. Holocaust historian Martin Gilbert wrote, "So outspoken were Pacelli’s criticisms that Hitler’s regime lobbied against him, trying to prevent his becoming the successor to Pius XI. When he did become Pope, as Pius XII, in March 1939, Nazi Germany was the only government not to send a representative to his coronation." Joseph Goebbels wrote in his diary on 4 March 1939 that Hitler was considering whether to abrogate the Concordat with Rome in light of Pacelli's election as Pope, adding, "This will surely happen when Pacelli undertakes his first hostile act." (Goebbels didn't specify what "hostile act" Hitler was concerned Pacelli might commit; during the years since 1933, Pacelli had issued numerous complaints about German violations of the Reichskonkordat.)

On the other hand, Nazi officials who were onsite at the Vatican as part of the German embassy, and therefore in a position to speak with Pacelli directly, were in favor of his becoming pope. According to Cambridge University Regius Professor of History Owen Chadwick, when the counsellor to the Italian embassy to the Vatican spoke to Fritz Menshausen, the counsellor to the German embassy, about the upcoming papal election, "Menshausen 'repeatedly insisted' that the best thing for Germany would be Cardinal Pacelli as Pope and Cardinal Tedeschini as Secretary of State, for this election would bring détente between the Reich and the Holy See... [Cologne Cardinal Karl Joseph] Schulte told [German ambassador Diego] von Bergen that he had three conversations with Cardinal Pacelli; and Pacelli expressed, unequivocally, plans for conciliation with Germany and also with Italy... [Italian ambassador Bonifacio] Pignatti asked von Bergen whether the government in Berlin liked the idea of Pacelli as Pope. Von Bergen answered that he had kept the German government informed; that he had shown them his own clear opinion in favour of Cardinal Pacelli; that he had received no instructions to the contrary; and therefore he inferred his government looked with a friendly eye on the candidature of Cardinal Pacelli. (In fact the Germans had only a lukewarm attitude to Cardinal Pacelli.)"

Pius's first meeting with a foreign diplomat after his election was with the German ambassador. Pius repeated a sentence from a speech he'd given the year before in Budapest implying that the wouldn't try to interfere with Hitler's domestic policies. "It is not the business of the Church to take sides in purely temporal affairs and in the accommodations between the different systems and methods which may arise for overcoming the urgent problems of the present."

The next day - four days after his election - Pius wrote Hitler as follows:

To the Illustrious Herr Adolf Hitler, Führer and Chancellor of the German Reich! Here at the beginning of Our pontificate We wish to assure you that We remain devoted to the spiritual welfare of the German people entrusted to your leadership.... During the many years we spent in Germany, then We did all in Our power to establish harmonious relations between Church and State. Now that the responsibilities of Our pastoral function have increased Our opportunities, how much more ardently do We pray to reach that goal. May the prosperity of the German people and their progress in every domain come, with God's help, to fruition!

=== Attempts to forestall and limit the spread of war in Europe ===
Pius lobbied world leaders to prevent the outbreak of the Second World War, trying on at least two occasions to persuade Poland to accept Hitler's demands to cede the Free City of Danzig to Germany. Later, after Poland had been overrun but France and the Low Countries had yet to be attacked, Pius continued to hope for a negotiated peace to prevent the spread of the conflict. The similarly minded US President Franklin D. Roosevelt began to reestablish American diplomatic relations with the Vatican after a seventy-year hiatus and dispatched Myron C. Taylor as his personal representative. American correspondence spoke of "parallel endeavours for peace and the alleviation of suffering". Despite the early collapse of peace hopes, the Taylor mission continued at the Vatican.

=== Reactions to racial laws ===
Pius never issued any public protests against Mussolini's racial laws targeting Italy's Jews. In 1939, he appointed several prominent Jewish scholars to posts at the Vatican after they had been dismissed from Italian universities due to the racial laws. He later engineered an agreement – formally approved on 23 June 1939 – with Getúlio Vargas, then-President of Brazil, to issue 3,000 visas to "non-Aryan Catholics," i.e., converted Jews. However, over the next eighteen months, Brazil's Conselho de Imigração e Colonização (CIC) continued to tighten the restrictions on visa issuance – including requiring a baptismal certificate dated before 1933, a substantial monetary transfer to the Banco do Brasil, and approval by the Brazilian Propaganda Office in Berlin – culminating in the cancellation of the program fourteen months later, after fewer than 1,000 visas had been issued, amid suspicions of "improper conduct" (i.e. continuing to practice Judaism) among those who had received visas.

Alexander De Grand, professor of history at North Carolina State University, commented in 2002,

If the Catholic Church had chosen to do so, it might have given battle on the Italian racial laws, as it was willing to do to maintain its network of university student groups and Catholic Action which it considered the nucleus of a future political class. Given the fact that the [Fascist] regime was moving toward war and needed the support of the clergy, especially in rural Italy, determined resistance from the Church certainly would have had some impact. But the Church was silent in the face of racial laws, which were among the most severe outside of Germany and caused widespread suffering as students were expelled from schools and professors from universities and academic societies. Professional careers and businesses were disrupted and foreign Jews stripped of all protection.

=== Encyclical letter Summi Pontificatus ===
Summi Pontificatus was the first encyclical of Pope Pius XII published on 20 October 1939. The encyclical is subtitled "On the Unity of Human Society". During the drafting of the letter, the Second World War commenced with the Nazi/Soviet invasion of Catholic Poland. Couched in diplomatic language, Pius endorses Catholic resistance and states disapproval of the war, racism, the Nazi/Soviet invasion of Poland, and the persecutions of the Church. Following themes addressed in Non abbiamo bisogno (1931), Mit brennender Sorge (1937) and Divini redemptoris (1937), Pius wrote of a need to bring back to the Church those who were following "a false standard ... misled by error, passion, temptation and prejudice, [who] have strayed away from faith in the true God". He wrote of "Christians unfortunately more in name than in fact," showing "cowardice" in the face of persecution by these creeds, and endorsed resistance:

Who among "the Soldiers of Christ"—ecclesiastic or layman—does not feel himself incited and spurred on to a greater vigilance, to a more determined resistance, by the sight of the ever-increasing host of Christ's enemies; as he perceives the spokesmen of these tendencies deny or in practice neglect the vivifying truths and the values inherent in belief in God and in Christ; as he perceives them wantonly break the Tables of God's Commandments to substitute other tables and other standards stripped of the ethical content of the Revelation on Sinai, standards in which the spirit of the Sermon on the Mount and of the Cross has no place?

— Pius XII, Summi Pontificatus

Pius wrote of a time when "charity" was required for victims with a "right" to compassion.

John Cornwell notes the "powerful words" on the theme of the "unity of the human race" and the use of a quotation from Saint Paul that in Christ there is "neither Greek nor Jew, circumcision nor uncircumcision". Frank J. Coppa wrote "It is true that Pius XII's first encyclical of 20 October 1939 rejected the claims of absolute state authority propounded by the totalitarian powers, but his denunciation was general rather than specific and difficult to decipher."

The Western allies dropped leaflets over Germany containing a translation of the Pope's encyclical in German and broadcast its contents. In Berlin, von Bergen declared that the Pope had ceased to be neutral, whilst in Italy, Mussolini allowed it to be printed. Guenter Lewy notes that the Gestapo considered the contents to be sufficiently "innocuous and ambiguous" that they allowed it to be read from the pulpits. He further asserts that the Pope's pronunciations in the encyclical relating to his intention "to give testimony to the truth" without fear of opposition, along with similar sentiments expressed by the German episcopate, "remained an empty formula in the face of the Jewish tragedy". Saul Friedländer also notes that Pius said nothing about the persecution of Jews. Susan Zuccotti opined that Pius failed "dismally" to live up to promises made in the encyclical in the "light of his subsequent silence in the face of appalling horrors". To Zuccotti, the letter cannot be depicted as a campaign against anti-Judaism but still "made a valuable statement". Owen Chadwick notes that Germans, even allowing it to be read from many pulpits, stopped its printing and distribution and the Gestapo ordered inquiries into people who read or tried to distribute it. Chadwick concludes that Summi Pontificatus "in its way it was as strong an attack on Nazi Policies as Mit brennender Sorge of Pius XI".

==== Ambiguous message on racism ====
In Summi Pontificatus, Pius XII reiterated Catholic commitment to human brotherhood, in a passage that some commentators have seen as an indirect condemnation of racism and antisemitism:

In accordance with these principles of equality, the Church devotes her care to forming cultured native clergy and gradually increasing the number of native Bishops. And in order to give external expression to these, Our intentions, We have chosen the forthcoming Feast of Christ the King to raise to the Episcopal dignity at the Tomb of the Apostles twelve representatives of widely different peoples and races. In the midst of the disruptive contrasts which divide the human family, may this solemn act proclaim to all Our sons, scattered over the world, that the spirit, the teaching and the work of the Church can never be other than that which the Apostle of the Gentiles preached: "putting on the new, (man) him who is renewed unto knowledge, according to the image of him that created him. Where there is neither Gentile nor Jew, circumcision nor uncircumcision, barbarian nor Scythian, bond nor free. But Christ is all and in all" (Colossians iii. 10, 11).

— Pius XII, Summi Pontificatus

Ronald Rychlak wrote that "the equating of Gentiles and Jews would have to be seen as a clear rejection of Hitler's fundamental ideology". Martin Rhonheimer interpreted the text as lacking an "explicit" reference to racism, but containing "implicit" reference to it in the section on "The unity of the human race" which he thinks is possibly an echo of the never-issued encyclical against racism which would have dealt with antisemitism and the "Jewish question", topics not dealt with in Summi Pontificatus. Rhonheimer considered that the encyclical did not condemn the "modern form" of social, political and economic antisemitism which was driven by traditional anti-Judaism and which he saw as shared by Catholics in various degrees. (See also La Civiltà Cattolica and Pope Pius XI's speech to Belgian pilgrims.) Tim Parks has similarly observed that the text does not explicitly address racism, and David Kertzer notes that German newspapers interpreted the encyclical as supporting the German cause.

==== Invasion of Poland ====
In Summi Pontificatus, in the aftermath of the invasion of Poland by Nazi Germany and the Soviet Union, Pius XII expressed dismay at the outbreak of war – "the dread tempest of war is already raging despite all Our efforts to avert it" – and declared his sympathy for the Polish people and hope of the resurrection of their nation:

The blood of countless human beings, even noncombatants, raises a piteous dirge over a nation such as Our dear Poland, which, for its fidelity to the Church, for its services in the defense of Christian civilization, written in indelible characters in the annals of history, has a right to the generous and brotherly sympathy of the whole world, while it awaits, relying on the powerful intercession of Mary, Help of Christians, the hour of a resurrection in harmony with the principles of justice and true peace.

— Pius XII, Summi Pontificatus

Phayer (2000) interprets the encyclical as condemning war but not condemning the invasion.

The Catholic Church in Poland became subject to brutal Nazi repression.

In May 1942, the Pope appointed a German Apostolic Administrator to lands in Nazi-occupied Poland (Wurtheland). According to Phayer (2008), this was seen as implicit recognition of the breakup of Poland, and this, combined with Pius's failure to censure the invasion explicitly, led to a sense of betrayal amongst the Poles.

In December 1942, the Polish President in exile wrote to Pius XII appealing that "the silence must be broken by the Apostolic See".

== 1940–1941 ==
=== Pius assists the German Resistance ===
With Poland overrun but France and the Low Countries yet to be attacked, the German Resistance sought the pope's assistance in preparations for a coup to oust Hitler; Colonel Hans Oster of the Abwehr sent Catholic lawyer Josef Müller on a clandestine trip to Rome to seek papal assistance in the developing plot. During this period when Hitler and Stalin were working in concert to carve up central and eastern Europe, and it appeared to Pius that western Europe might be spared at least in part, the pope agreed, participating in secret communications involving Britain's Francis d'Arcy Osborne. The plot soon petered out due to British frustration with the German conspirators' felt need for anonymity and to the Allies' unwillingness to promise that the German military could remain intact after Hitler was removed, an assurance without which the conspirators were unwilling to move forward, while Pius became increasingly anxious. The pope warned the Belgian and Dutch Governments that Germany was planning an invasion for 10 May 1940. According to Peter Hebblethwaite, the Germans "regarded the Pope's behaviour as equivalent to espionage". Following the Fall of France, peace overtures continued to emanate from the Vatican, to which Churchill responded resolutely that Germany would first have to free its conquered territories. The negotiations ultimately proved fruitless. Hitler's swift victories over France and the Low Countries deflated the will of the German military to resist Hitler. The Resistance and Pius continued to communicate.

=== Response to internment of Jews ===
In 2008, Justin Ewers, a staff writer for U.S. News and World Report, wrote that in 1940 Pius asked members of the clergy, on Vatican letterhead, to do whatever they could on behalf of interned Jews.

== 1942 ==
=== 1942 Christmas Address to College of Cardinals ===
In December 1942, in his Christmas discourse to members of the Roman Curia, Pius XII remarks on how both the Church and its ministers experience the "sign of contradiction" as they try to defend truth and virtue for the well-being of souls. The Pope questions whether such efforts of love and sacrifice could nevertheless furnish reasons for lamentation, for pusillanimity, or for the weakening of apostolic courage and zeal. He responds in the negative:

The apostle's deserved lament ... is the regret that weighed on the heart of the Savior and made him pour out tears at the sight of Jerusalem, the place which to his invitation and his grace opposed such obstinate blindness and such stubborn lack of recognition, that would lead her along the path of blame, in the end to deicide.

— Pope Pius XII

Historian Guido Knopp describes these comments of Pius as being "incomprehensible" at a time when "Jerusalem was being murdered by the million".

=== Netherlands ===
On 26 July 1942, Dutch bishops, including Archbishop Johannes de Jong, issued a decree that openly condemned Nazi deportations of Dutch workers and Jews. The Nazi response was the rounding up of 245 Catholics of Jewish descent who were never heard from again. After this event, Sister Pascalina Lehnert said the Pope was convinced that while the Bishop's protest cost two hundred lives, a protest by himself would mean at least two hundred thousand innocent lives that he was not ready to sacrifice. While politicians, generals, and dictators might gamble with the lives of people, a Pope could not. Pius XII often repeated what he told the Italian ambassador to the Vatican in 1940, "We would like to utter words of fire against such actions [German atrocities] and the only thing restraining us from speaking is the fear of making the plight of the victims even worse."

=== 1942 letters ===
On 18 September 1942, Pius received a letter from Monsignor Giovanni Montini (future Pope Paul VI), saying, "the massacres of the Jews reach frightening proportions and forms". Later that month, Myron Taylor, U.S. representative to the Vatican, warned Pius that the Vatican's "moral prestige" was being injured by silence on European atrocities. According to Phayer, this warning was echoed simultaneously by representatives from Great Britain, Brazil, Uruguay, Belgium, and Poland.

Taylor passed along a US Government memorandum to Pius on 26 September 1942, outlining intelligence received from the Jewish Agency for Palestine which said that Jews from across the Nazi Empire were being systematically "butchered". Taylor asked if the Vatican might have any information which might tend to "confirm the reports", and if so, what the Pope might be able to do to influence public opinion against the "barbarities". Cardinal Secretary of State Maglione handed Harold H. Tittmann, Jr. a response to the letter on 10 October. The note thanked Washington for passing on the intelligence, and confirmed that reports of severe measures against the Jews had reached the Vatican from other sources, though it had not been possible to "verify their accuracy". At the same time, it said that "every opportunity is being taken by the Holy See, however, to mitigate the suffering of these unfortunate people."

In December 1942, when Tittmann asked Maglione if Pius would issue a proclamation similar to the Allied declaration "German Policy of Extermination of the Jewish Race", Maglione replied that the Vatican was "unable to denounce publicly particular atrocities". That same month, a letter dated 14 December 1942 from Lothar Koenig, a German Jesuit and member of the Catholic anti-Hitler resistance, to Pius' secretary, a fellow German Jesuit named Robert Leiber, reported that the Nazis were killing up to 6,000 Jews and Poles daily from Rava Ruska, and that they were transporting them to the Belzec extermination camp.

=== Christmas 1942 address ===
By late 1942, Phayer has written,

The pressure on the Holy See from the United States, England, and a host of other countries to break out of its silence about the Holocaust led Secretary Maglione to promise that the pope would speak about the issue. This he did in his 1942 Christmas address. Pope Pius’s radio talk contained twenty-seven words about the Holocaust out of twenty-six pages of text. The part about the Holocaust, buried in a sea of verbosity, did not mention Jews.

The 1942 Christmas address, titled "The Internal Order Of States And People," consists of 6,956 words in English translation. Approximately five-sixths of the way through the speech, the pope said the following: (The sentence described as referring to the Jewish genocide is in italics.)

Should they [i.e., the world's nations] not rather, over the ruins of a social order which has given such tragic proof of its ineptitude as a factor for the good of the people, gather together the hearts of all those who are magnanimous and upright, in the solemn vow not to rest until in all peoples and all nations of the earth a vast legion shall be formed of those handfuls of men who, bent on bringing back society to its center of gravity, which is the law of God, aspire to the service of the human person and of his common life ennobled in God?

Mankind owes that vow to the countless dead who lie buried on the field of battle: The sacrifice of their lives in the fulfillment of their duty is a holocaust offered for a new and better social order. Mankind owes that vow to the innumerable sorrowing host of mothers, widows and orphans who have seen the light, the solace and the support of their lives wrenched from them. Mankind owes that vow to those numberless exiles whom the hurricane of war has torn from their native land and scattered in the land of the stranger; who can make their own the lament of the Prophet: “Our inheritance is turned to aliens; our house to strangers.” Mankind owes that vow to the hundreds of thousands of persons who, without any fault on their part, sometimes only because of their nationality or race, have been consigned to death or to a slow decline. Mankind owes that vow to the many thousands of non- combatants, women, children, sick and aged, from whom aerial war-fare — whose horrors we have from the beginning frequently denounced — has without discrimination or through inadequate precautions, taken life, goods, health, home, charitable refuge, or house of prayer. Mankind owes that vow to the flood of tears and bitterness, to the accumulation of sorrow and suffering, emanating from the murderous ruin of the dreadful conflict and crying to Heaven to send down the Holy Spirit to liberate the world from the inundation of violence and terror.

And where could you with greater assurance and trust and with more efficacious faith place this vow for the renewal of society than at the foot of the “Desired of all Nations” Who lies before us in the crib with all the charm of His sweet humanity as a Babe, but also in the dynamic attraction of His incipient mission as Redeemer? Where could this noble and holy crusade for the cleaning and renewal of society have a more significant consecration or find a more potent inspiration than at Bethlehem, where the new Adam appears in the adorable mystery of the Incarnation? For it is at His fountains of truth and grace that mankind should find the water of life if it is not to perish in the desert of this life; “Of His fullness we all have received.” His fullness of grace and truth cows as freely today as it has for twenty centuries on the world.

According to Galeazzo Ciano, Mussolini commented on the pope's message with sarcasm: "This is a speech of platitudes which might better be made by the parish priest of Predappio." Francis D'Arcy-Osborne, the ambassador to the Vatican from Great Britain, was sarcastic as well. "He has produced the inevitable Five Points this year on the special social problem or social problems."

Some responses were laudatory; these included a New York Times editorial that called the pope "a lonely voice crying out of the silence of a continent." (This echoed the tone and even language of the Times editorial about Pius's Christmas address of a year earlier: "The voice of Pius XII is a lonely voice in the silence and darkness enveloping Europe this Christmas.")

US envoy to the Vatican Harold Tittman on one hand wrote that the speech clearly referred to the persecutions and deportations of the Jews but on the other hand that it "does not satisfy those circles which had hoped that the Pope would this time call a spade a spade a spade and discard his usual practice of speaking in generalities." The UK's Osborne, after discussing the speech with Pius, wrote, "To me he claimed that he had condemned the Jewish persecution. I could not dissent from this, though the condemnation is inferential and not specific, and comes at the end of a long dissertation on social problems."

The Christmas address was also a topic of discussion when Pius held his annual New Year's audience with Polish ambassador to the Vatican Kazimierz Papée, who wrote afterwards,

The pope is now convinced that he clearly and strongly, albeit generically, condemned German crimes in occupied countries. There lies the source of difficulties.... Pius XII... due to his sensitive and delicate nature, the character of his studies and a certain one-sidedness of his career - exclusively diplomatic and far from [real] life - cannot speak a different language and passes by the realities of our time, not realizing how little an average Catholic can understand and remember from his enunciations, isolated from facts, complex and carefully polished.

== 1943 ==
=== Ad maiora mala vitanda ===
On 30 April 1943, Pius wrote to Bishop Von Preysing of Berlin to say: "We give to the pastors who are working on the local level the duty of determining if and to what degree the danger of reprisals and of various forms of oppression occasioned by episcopal declarations ... ad maiora mala vitanda (to avoid worse) ... seem to advise caution. Here lies one of the reasons, why We impose self-restraint on Ourselves in our speeches; the experience, that we made in 1942 with papal addresses, which We authorized to be forwarded to the Believers, justifies our opinion, as far as We see. ... The Holy See has done whatever was in its power, with charitable, financial and moral assistance. To say nothing of the substantial sums which we spent in American money for the fares of immigrants."

=== Communication from Father Scavizzi ===
In the spring of 1943 Pirro Scavizzi, an Italian priest, told Pius that the murder of the Jews was "now total", even the elderly and infants were being destroyed "without mercy". Pius is reported to have broken down and wept uncontrollably.

Pius said to Father Scavizzi, "I have often considered excommunication, to castigate in the eyes of the entire world the fearful crime of genocide. But after much praying and many tears, I realize that my condemnation would not only fail to help the Jews, it might even worsen their situation ... No doubt a protest would gain me the praise and respect of the civilized world, but it would have submitted the poor Jews to an even worse persecution."

=== Allegation of a kidnapping plot ===
In 1943, plans were allegedly formulated by Hitler to occupy the Vatican and arrest Pius and the cardinals of the Roman Curia. According to Peter Gumpel, the historian in charge of Pius' canonization process, the Pope told leading bishops that should he be arrested by Nazi forces, his resignation would take immediate effect and that the Holy See would move to another country, specifically Portugal, where the College of Cardinals would elect a new pope. Some historians argue that Hitler wanted to capture the Pope because he was concerned Pius would continue speaking against the way the Nazis treated the Jews, and that the plan was never brought to fruition because it was foiled by Nazi general Karl Wolff. Both British historian Owen Chadwick and Jesuit ADSS editor Robert A. Graham dismissed the existence of a plot as a creation of the Political Warfare Executive. Subsequent to those accounts, Dan Kurzman in 2007 published a work which he maintained established the plot as fact. Reviews of Kurzman's book ranged from accepting of his basic thesis to skeptical. Saint Mary's College professor of politics David Alvarez wrote in The Catholic Historical Review,

The author’s footnotes are useless (often a single, vague footnote will cover several pages of text), but it seems that he relies primarily upon the postwar recollections of individuals, including the now-deceased Wolff, who claimed to have been involved in the events. Not surprisingly, the witnesses portray themselves as good guys. All, particularly the Germans, seem to have been anti-Nazi and secretly working to confound Hitler’s plans even if they had to hide their political opposition beneath SS uniforms. The testimony of some of these witnesses is, to put it mildly, suspect. Wolff, whose recollections form the basis for the story, is especially untrustworthy since even the author acknowledges that the SS officer was an amoral opportunist who, after the war, consistently twisted the truth of his wartime career in order to avoid conviction as a war criminal. The reader might wonder if Wolff manipulated the story of an alleged plot against the pope to further his postwar political rehabilitation. Suspect testimony might have been buttressed by documentary evidence, but the author (accepting Wolff’s assertions) assures us that the plot was so secret that no records were kept. In fact, there are two documentary sources relevant to a kidnapping operation, a diary entry by Joseph Goebbels after Mussolini’s arrest in July 1943 and a directive circulated by Martin Bormann to Nazi Party Gauleiters in November 1943, both of which undermine the claim of a plot.

=== German occupation of Rome ===
According to Joseph Lichten, the Vatican was called upon by the Jewish Community Council in Rome to help fill a Nazi demand of one hundred Troy Pounds (37.3 kilograms) of gold. The Council had been able to muster seventy pounds (26.1 kg.), but unless the entire amount was produced within thirty-six hours had been told three hundred Jews would be imprisoned. The Pope offered an interest-free loan without a time limit, according to Chief Rabbi Zolli of Rome. However, the Roman Jewish community managed to meet the requirement, and delivered the gold to the occupiers on September 28. Despite the payment of the ransom, 1,015 Jews were deported on 16 October 1943 in the Roman razzia, and 839 of them were murdered in concentration and death camps. Many others were also killed on 24 March 1944, at the Fosse Ardeatine.

=== Nuncio Orsenigo's appeal to Hitler ===
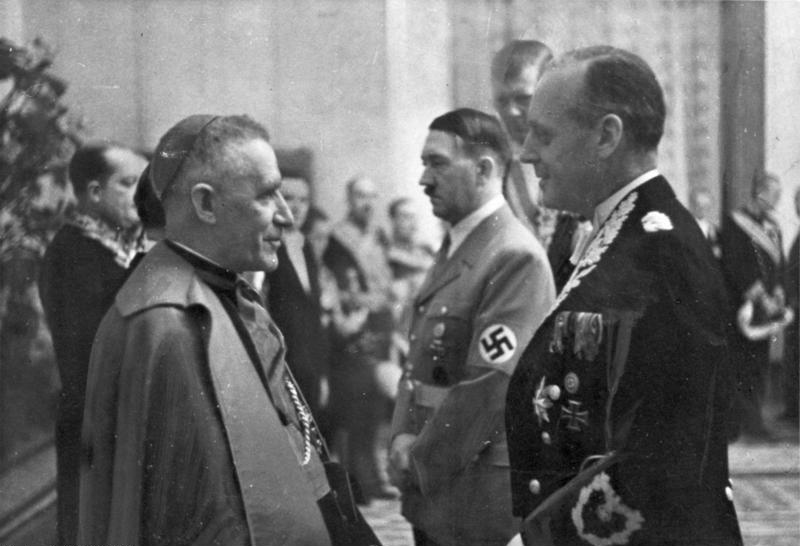
Cesare Orsenigo with Hitler and von Ribbentrop

In November 1943, nuncio Cesare Orsenigo spoke to the leader of the Third Reich on behalf of Pope Pius XII. In his conversation with Hitler, he talked about the status of persecuted peoples in the Third Reich, apparently referring to Jews. This conversation with the Nazi leader led to no success. Over large parts of the conversation Hitler simply ignored Orsenigo; he went to the window and did not listen. (Note: M. Biffi, in Mons. Cesare Orsenigo, page 241, note 43, says that Orsenigo first told of this incident to Professor E. Senatra a few days after it had occurred. A. Rhodes in The Vatican in the Age of the Dictators, 1922–1945, page 343. notes that it was reported in Petrus Blatt, April 7, 1963, and quoted in Documentation Catholique, 18 August 1963.)

== 1944–1945 ==
=== Actions of Angelo Roncalli ===
Part of the historical debate surrounding Pius XII has concerned the role of nuncio Angelo Roncalli, the future John XXIII, in rescuing Jews during the War. While some historians have argued that Roncalli was acting as a nuncio on behalf of the Pope, others have said that he was acting on his own when he intervened on behalf of Jews, as it would appear by the rather independent position he took during the Jewish orphans controversy. According to Michael Phayer, Roncalli always said that he had been acting on the orders of Pius XII in his actions to rescue Jews.

According to the Raoul Wallenberg Foundation, Roncalli forwarded a request for the Vatican to inquire whether other neutral countries could grant asylum to Jews, to inform the German government that the Palestine Jewish Agency had 5,000 immigration certificates available and to ask Vatican Radio to broadcast that helping Jews was an act of mercy approved by the Church. In 1944, Roncalli used diplomatic couriers, papal representatives and the Sisters of Our Lady of Zion to transport and issue baptismal certificates, immigration certificates and visas – many of them forged – to Hungarian Jews. A dispatch dated Aug. 16, 1944 from Roncalli to the papal nuncio to Hungary illustrates the intensity of "Operation Baptism".

=== Roman razzia ===
On 28 October 1943, Ernst von Weizsäcker, the German Ambassador to the Vatican, telegrammed Berlin that "the Pope has not yet let himself be persuaded to make an official condemnation of the deportation of the Roman Jews. ... Since it is currently thought that the Germans will take no further steps against the Jews in Rome, the question of our relations with the Vatican may be considered closed."

After receiving a sentence of death, Adolf Eichmann wrote in his diary an account of the round up of Roman Jews: "At that time, my office received the copy of a letter, that I immediately gave to my direct superiors, sent by the Catholic Church in Rome, in the person of Bishop Hudal, to the commander of the German forces in Rome, General Stahel. The Church was vigorously protesting the arrest of Jews of Italian citizenship, requesting that such actions be interrupted immediately throughout Rome and its surroundings. To the contrary, the Pope would denounce it publicly ... The Curia was especially angry because these incidents were taking place practically under Vatican windows. But, precisely at that time, without paying any attention to the Church's position, the Italian Fascist Government passed a law ordering the deportation of all Italian Jews to concentration camps. ... The objections given and the excessive delay in the steps necessary to complete the implementation of the operation resulted in a great part of Italian Jews being able to hide and escape capture."

Historian Susan Zuccotti, author of Under His Very Windows: The Vatican and the Holocaust in Italy, wrote "If the Pope remained silent, however, he allowed nuns, monks, priests, and prelates in his diocese, including several at the Vicaraite, to involve themselves in Jewish rescue. Many Church institutions, including Vatican properties sheltered Jews along with other types of fugitives for long periods." James Kurth in his essay The Defamation of Pope Pius XII, writes that she [Susan Zuccotti] "is intent on arguing that Pius XII even allowed the deportation of the Jews of Rome from 'under his very windows'. To do so, she has to be silent about the much greater number of Roman Jews that the Church, with the approval of the Pope, hid within a wide network of monasteries, convents, schools, and hospitals, 'under the very windows' of the Gestapo and the collaborating Fascist police."

In August 2006, extracts from the 60-year-old diary of a nun of the Convent of Santi Quattro Coronati were published in the Italian press, stating that Pope Pius XII ordered Rome's convents and monasteries to hide Jews during the Second World War.

=== Conversions of Jews to Catholicism ===
The conversion of Jews to Catholicism during the Holocaust is one of the most controversial aspects of the record of Pope Pius XII during that period. According to Roth and Ritner, "this is a key point because, in debates about Pius XII, his defenders regularly point to denunciations of racism and defense of Jewish converts as evidence of opposition to antisemitism of all sorts". On the other hand, the Holocaust is one of the most acute examples of the "recurrent and acutely painful issue in the Catholic-Jewish dialogue", namely "Christian efforts to convert Jews".

=== Meeting with Churchill ===
In August 1944, following the Liberation of Rome Pius met British Prime Minister Winston Churchill, who was visiting the city. At their meeting, the Pope acknowledged the justice of punishing war criminals, but expressed a hope that the people of Italy would not be punished, but, with the war continuing, he hoped that they would be made "full allies".

=== Address to the College of Cardinals ===
In June 1945, the month after VE Day, Pius delivered an address of over 3.500 words to the College of Cardinals. This was the first time since the outbreak of the war that he spoke explicitly about Nazism - referred to in the address as "nazionalsocialismo" rather than "nazismo" - in public. He spoke in detail about the Nazis' having enacted a "campaign of religious persecution" of the Catholic church. "The struggle against the church did, in fact, become ever more bitter: there was the dissolution of Catholic organizations; the gradual suppression of the flourishing Catholic schools, both public and private; the enforced weaning of youth from family and church; the pressure brought to bear on the conscience of citizens and especially of civil servants; the systematic defamation, by means of a clever, closely organized propaganda, of the church, the clergy, the faithful, the church's institutions, teaching and history; the closing, dissolution and confiscation of religious houses and other ecclesiastical institutions; the complete suppression of the Catholic press and publishing houses." German Catholics were portrayed as having opposed Nazism in large numbers. "To resist such attacks millions of courageous Catholics, men and women, closed their ranks around their Bishops, whose valiant and severe pronouncements never failed to resound even in these last years of war. These Catholics gathered around their priests to help them adapt their ministry to the ever changing needs and conditions. And right up to the end they set up against the forces of impiety and pride their forces of faith, prayer and openly Catholic behavior and education." He described Pius XI's encyclical Mit brennender sorge as a vigorous "- too vigorous, thought more than one at the time -" attack on Nazism's errors. He also described himself as having been a consistent public foe of Nazism. "Continuing the work of our predecessor, we ourselves have during the war and especially in our radio messages constantly set forth the demands and perennial laws of humanity and of the Christian faith in contrast with the ruinous and inexorable applications of national socialist teachings, which even went so far as to use the most exquisite scientific methods to torture or eliminate people who were often innocent." He spoke in detail about Catholic priests who had been imprisoned and murdered by the Nazis, both in Germany and in occupied Europe.

The address did not include any mention of Jews or of the extermination of almost two thirds of Europe's Jewish population.

== Holocaust by country ==
=== Austria ===
In 1941, Cardinal Theodor Innitzer of Vienna informed Pius of Jewish deportations in Vienna.

=== Croatia ===
Archbishop Stepinac called a synod of Croatian bishops in November 1941. The synod appealed to Croatian leader Ante Pavelić to treat Jews "as humanely as possible, considering that there were German troops in the country". The Vatican replied with praise to Marcone with praise for what the synod had done for "citizens of Jewish origin", although Israeli historian Menachem Shelah demonstrates that the synod concerned itself only with converted Jews. Pius personally praised the synod for "courage and decisiveness".

=== France ===
Later in 1941, when asked by French Marshal Philippe Pétain if the Vatican objected to anti-Jewish laws, Pius responded that the Church condemned antisemitism, but would not comment on specific rules. Similarly, when Philippe Pétain's regime adopted the "Jewish statutes", the Vichy ambassador to the Vatican, Léon Bérard (a French politician), was told that the legislation did not conflict with Catholic teachings. Valerio Valeri, the nuncio to France was "embarrassed" when he learned of this publicly from Pétain and personally checked the information with Cardinal Secretary of State Maglione, who confirmed the Vatican's position.

Yet in June 1942 Pius personally protested against the mass deportations of Jews from France, ordering the papal nuncio to protest to Marshal Pétain against "the inhuman arrests and deportations of Jews". In October 1941 Harold Tittman, a U.S. delegate to the Vatican, asked the pope to condemn the atrocities against Jews; Pius replied that the Vatican wished to remain "neutral", reiterating the neutrality policy that he'd invoked as early as September 1940.

=== Hungary ===
Before the Holocaust began, an International Eucharistic Conference took place in Budapest, Hungary in 1938. Cardinal Pacelli addressed the congress and described the Jews as people "whose lips curse [Christ] and whose hearts reject him even today". Michael Phayer asserts that the timing of the statement, during a period when Hungary was in the process of formulating new antisemitic laws, ran counter to Pope Pius XI's September statement urging Catholics to honour their spiritual father Abraham.

In March 1944, through the papal nuncio in Budapest, Angelo Rotta, the pope urged the Hungarian government to moderate its treatment of the Jews. The pope also ordered Rotta and other papal legates to hide and shelter Jews. These protests, along with others from the King of Sweden, the International Red Cross, the United States, and Britain led to the cessation of deportations on 8 July 1944. Also in 1944, Pius appealed to 13 Latin American governments to accept "emergency passports", although it also took the intervention of the U.S. State Department for those countries to honor the documents.

=== Lithuania ===
Cardinal Secretary of State Luigi Maglione received a request from Chief Rabbi of Palestine Yitzhak HaLevi Herzog in the spring of 1939 to intercede on behalf of Lithuanian Jews about to be deported to Germany. Pius called Ribbentrop on 11 March, repeatedly protesting against the treatment of Jews. In his 1940 encyclical Summi Pontificatus, Pius rejected antisemitism, stating that in the Catholic Church there is "neither Gentile nor Jew, circumcision nor uncircumcision". Journalist Justin Ewers wrote in a 2008 U.S. News and World Report article that in 1940 Pius asked members of the clergy, on Vatican letterhead, to do whatever they could on behalf of interned Jews.

=== The Netherlands ===
After Germany invaded the Low Countries during 1940, Pius sent expressions of sympathy to the Queen of the Netherlands, the King of Belgium, and the Grand Duchess of Luxembourg. When Mussolini learned of the warnings and the telegrams of sympathy, he took them as a personal affront and had his ambassador to the Vatican file an official protest, charging that Pius XII had taken sides against Italy's ally Germany. Mussolini's foreign minister claimed that Pius XII was "ready to let himself be deported to a concentration camp, rather than do anything against his conscience".

When Dutch bishops protested against the wartime deportation of Jews in 1942, the Nazis responded with harsher measures rounding up 92 converts including Edith Stein who were then deported and murdered. "The brutality of the retaliation made an enormous impression on Pius XII." (Note: When Hitler showed increasing belligerence toward the Church, Pius met the challenge with a decisiveness that astonished the world. His encyclical Mit brenneder Sorge was the "first great official public document to dare to confront and criticize Nazism" and "one of the greatest such condemnations ever issued by the Vatican". Smuggled into Germany, it was read from all the Catholic pulpits on Palm Sunday in March 1937. It exposed the fallacy and denounced the Nazi myth of blood and soil; it decried its neopaganism, its war of annihilation against the Church, and even described the Fuhrer himself as a "mad prophet possessed of repulsive arrogance". The Nazis were infuriated, and in retaliation closed and sealed all the presses that had printed it and took numerous vindictive measures against the Church, including staging a long series of immorality trials of the Catholic clergy. (Bokenkotter (2004), pp. 389–392))

=== Slovakia ===
In September 1941 Pius objected to a Slovak Jewish Code, which, unlike the earlier Vichy codes, prohibited intermarriage between Jews and non-Jews.

In 1942, the Slovak charge d'affaires told Pius that Slovak Jews were being sent to concentration camps. On 11 March 1942, several days before the first transport was due to leave, the chargé d'affaires in Bratislava reported to the Vatican: "I have been assured that this atrocious plan is the handwork of ... Prime Minister (Tuka), who confirmed the plan ... he dared to tell me – he who makes such a show of his Catholicism – that he saw nothing inhuman or un-Christian in it ... the deportation of 80,000 persons to Poland, is equivalent to condemning a great number of them to certain death." The Vatican protested to the Slovak government that it "deplore[s] these ... measures which gravely hurt the natural human rights of persons, merely because of their race".

On 7 April 1943, Monsignor Domenico Tardini, one of Pius's closest advisors, told Pius that it would be politically advantageous after the war to take steps to help Slovak Jews.

== Debate around accusations of silence ==
Historian Susan Zuccotti argued that "Pius XII, the head of the Roman Catholic Church during the Second World War, did not speak out publicly against the destruction of the Jews. This fact is rarely contested, nor can it be. Evidence of a public protest, if it existed, would be easy to produce. It does not exist." Ecclesiastical historian William Doino (a contributor to The Pius War: Responses to the Critics of Pius XII) contests Zuccotti's assertion, and has said that Pius XII was "emphatically not 'silent', and did in fact condemn the Nazis' horrific crimes–through Vatican Radio, his first encyclical, Summi Pontificatus, his major addresses (especially his Christmas allocutions), and the L’Osservatore Romano" and he "intervened, time and time again, for persecuted Jews, particularly during the German occupation of Rome, and was cited and hailed by the Catholic rescuers themselves as their leader and director".

In A History of Christianity, Michael Burleigh writes:

For reasons either of personal character or of professional training as a diplomat, his [Pius's] statements were exceedingly cautious and wrapped up in involuted language that is difficult for many to understand, especially in this age of the resonant sound-bite and ubiquitous rent-a-moralist. (Note: Paul Johnson wrote "Later he [Pius XII] defended his early war-statements by claiming that both sides construed them to be in their favour. In that case what was the point of issuing them?" (Johnson (1976), p. 490))

According to Giovanni Maria Vian of the Vatican Jesuit journal La Civiltà Cattolica the roots of Pius's alleged "silence", what he terms "a black legend", begins in early 1939 with the complaint of the French Catholic intellectual Emmanuel Mounier who questioned the failure of the Pope to censure the Italian aggression towards Albania and wrote of "the scandal of this silence". He further notes that in 1951 another French Catholic intellectual, François Mauriac, wrote in the introduction to a book by "the Jew Poliakov" that "we never had the comfort of hearing the successor of Galilee, Simon Peter, [i.e Pius XII] use clear and precise words, rather than diplomatic allusions, to condemn the countless crucifixions of the 'brothers of the Lord' [i.e. Jewish people]".

The British representative to the Vatican wrote the following in 1942: "A policy of silence in regard to such offences against the conscience of the world must necessarily involve a renunciation of moral leadership and a consequent atrophy of the influence of the Vatican". Pius stated on 3 August 1946 that "We condemned on various occasions in the past the persecution that a fanatical anti-Semitism inflicted on the Hebrew people." Garry Wills comments that "this is a deliberate falsehood. He never publicly mentioned the Holocaust." (Note: Pius's inaccurate characterization of Catholics as "wholeheartedly" opposed to Hitler's regime demonstrated his full acceptance of the German bishops' rejection of collective guilt in their Fulda statement of 1945. (Phayer (2000), p. 161)) (Note: It is of course not even remotely true to say that there was a positive intention not to help the Jews. It would be false, indeed slanderous, to claim that the Church deliberately delivered the Jews to their Nazi executioners. Nor can anyone claim that there was no desire, at least on the part of the Holy See, to help the Jews.) Michael Phayer notes that with the exception of the "very guarded terms" used in the 1942 Christmas message, Pope Pius did not speak out publicly about the Holocaust. Paul Johnson wrote "The Pope gave no guidance. Pius XII advised all Catholic everywhere to fight with valour and charity" and "What made Pius keep silent, apart from natural timidity and fear for the safety of the Vatican itself, was undoubtedly his belief that a total breach between Rome and Hitler would lead to a separatist German Catholic Church." (Note: In early 1942 Pius told the American diplomat Tittman that he could not speak out because "German people, in the bitterness of their defeat, will reproach him later on for having contributed, if only indirectly, to this defeat." Phayer considers this an implied warped standard that places concern of Germans towards the Pope against the millions of murdered Jews. Cardinal Tardini noted that "Pius was by temperament mild and rather shy. He was not made to be a fighter". (Phayer (2008), p. ix)) (Note: See Phayer (2000), p. 101 re Pius's concern over the possible bombing of Rome compared with the extermination of the Jews.)

Ronald Rychlak notes that Pius was recorded as saying "No doubt a protest would have gained me praise and respect of the civilized world, but it would have submitted the poor Jew to an even worse fate." (Note: Pius told Robert Leiber that he did not speak out about the murder of Jews since he did not wish to compromise his position as a potential peacemaker at the end of the war.(Phayer (2000), p. 57)) Guenter Lewy notes that some writers have suggested that a public protest by the Pope would only have made things worse for the Jews, but comments, "Since the condition of the Jews could hardly have become worse, and might have changed for the better, as a result of a papal denunciation, one could ask why the Church did not risk the well-being and safety of the Catholics and of the Vatican." Michael Phayer notes Pius making similar excuses in 1940 but comments that "This justification cannot be taken seriously." (Note: Phayer also dismisses the claims of apologists that Pius chose the path of silence after hearing that Catholics of Jewish descent were killed, because of the protestations of Archbishop de Jong in 1942, since he had previously remained silent over the Croatian genocide in which Catholics had slaughtered Jews and Serbs and well as other episodes. (Phayer (2000), pp. 44–45)) It is worth pointing out though, that while European Jews were being exterminated, the Nazis never systematically killed Mischlinge, or people of partial Jewish descent. Frank J. Coppa wrote: "During World War II as well, Papa Pacelli's diplomatic focus often restricted his moral mission, refusing to openly condemn Nazism's evil actions including its genocide when it appeared it might triumph, but denouncing it as satanic when it was defeated."

Martin Rhonheimer comments:

Well-intentioned Catholic apologists continue to produce reports of Church condemnations of Nazism and racism. But these do not really answer the Church's critics. The real problem is not the Church's relationship to National Socialism and racism, but the Church's relationship to the Jews. Here we need what the Church today urges: a 'purification of memory and conscience.' The Catholic Church's undeniable hostility to National Socialism and racism cannot be used to justify its silence about the persecution of the Jews. It is one thing to explain this silence historically and make it understandable. It is quite another to use such explanations for apologetic purposes.

Cardinal Tisserant, a senior member of the Roman Curia wrote to Cardinal Suhard, the Archbishop of Paris, as Nazi forces were overrunning France in June 1940. Tisserant expressed his concern at the racism of the Nazis, the systematic destruction of their victims and the moral reserve of Pius XII: "I'm afraid that history may be obliged in time to come to blame the Holy See for a policy accommodated to its own advantage and little more. And that is extremely sad – above all when one has lived under Pius XI."

President Franklin D. Roosevelt sent Myron C. Taylor as his special representative to the Vatican in September 1941. His assistant, Harold Tittman, repeatedly pointed out to Pius the dangers to his moral leadership by his failure to speak out against the violations of the natural law carried out by the Nazis. Pius responded that he could not name the Nazis without at the same time mentioning the Bolsheviks.

Pius XII also never publicly condemned the Nazi massacre of 1.8–1.9 million mainly Catholic Polish gentiles (including 2,935 members of the Catholic Clergy), nor did he ever publicly condemn the Soviet Union for the deaths of over 100,000 mainly Catholic Polish gentile citizens including an untold number of clergy.

In an interview Father Peter Gumpel stated that Robert Kempner's (former U.S. Nuremberg war crimes prosecutor) foreword to Jenő Lévai's 1968 book "Hungarian Jewry and the Papacy" asserts that Pius did indeed complain through diplomatic channels about the situation of Hungarian Jews but that any public protestation would have been of no use.

== Comments by Jewish leaders ==
Pinchas Lapide, a Jewish theologian and Israeli diplomat to Milan in the 1960s, wrote in Three Popes and the Jews that Catholics were "instrumental in saving at least 700,000 but probably as many as 860,000 Jews from certain death at Nazi hands". Some historians have questioned this oft-cited number, which Lapide reached by "deducting all reasonable claims of rescue" by non-Catholics from the number of Jews he claims succeeded in escaping to the free world from Nazi-controlled areas during the Holocaust.

According to Rabbi David Dalin, in the aftermath of the war, some of the Jewish leaders who hailed Pius as a righteous gentile for his work in saving thousands of Jews included the scientist Albert Einstein, the Israeli Prime Ministers Golda Meir and Moshe Sharett, and the Chief Rabbi Yitzhak HaLevi Herzog.

Israeli President Chaim Herzog, on the other hand, wrote about his father, Rabbi Herzog:

One night during Passover our house was invaded by a mob; I believe it was in connection with Altman's death sentence. They would not leave or allow us to celebrate the seder unless my father immediately obtained clemency for the condemned man. His sentence was commuted to imprisonment, but Ben-Yossef died bravely for the cause. My father was involved with many such cases and always used whatever personal influence he had. But he never succeeded in enlisting the help of the Vatican and of Pope Pius XII — neither during nor after the Holocaust... On each occasion he found him most unhelpful and unsympathetic — and even hostile. Tens of thousands of Jewish children had been hidden by Jews and Christians in monasteries and churches throughout Europe. In many places, they were not being allowed to reassume their Jewish identity or return to the Jewish community. Many children were not even aware that they were Jews, having been too young to be aware of their real identity when they were hidden. My father asked the pope to issue instructions to churches, monasteries, and other institutions to allow these children to return to their families or to the Jewish community. He refused. It is almost unfathomable that he did refuse and totally unfathomable why. Perhaps he was unwilling to relinquish his hold on these new Catholic converts. Perhaps it was for the same unknown reason that the Church gave so much help to fleeing Nazi war criminals.

The Chief Rabbi of Rome, Israel Zolli, took refuge in the Vatican following the Nazi occupation of Rome in 1943. Upon the arrival of the Allied Forces in Rome, on June 4, 1944, Israel Zolli resumed the post of Grand Rabbi and in the following July he celebrated a solemn ceremony in the Synagogue, which was broadcast by radio, to publicly express the gratitude of the Jewish community to Pius XII, for the help given to them during the Nazi persecution. Furthermore, on 25 July 1944 he went to the Vatican for an audience to officially thank the pope for what he, personally or through Catholics, had done in favor of the Jews, hosting them or hiding them in convents and monasteries, to save them from the racist hatred of the SS. Nazis; thus decreasing the already immense number of victims. After the war he converted to Catholicism and took the name "Eugenio" in honour of Pope Pius XII.

On 21 September 1945, the general secretary of the World Jewish Council, Dr. Leon Kubowitzky, presented an amount of money to the pope, "in recognition of the work of the Holy See in rescuing Jews from Fascist and Nazi persecutions". After the war, in the autumn of 1945, Harry Greenstein from Baltimore, a close friend of Chief Rabbi Herzog of Jerusalem, told Pius how grateful Jews were for all he had done for them. The pope replied, "My only regret is not to have been able to save a greater number of Jews."

Catholic scholar Kevin Madigan interprets the postwar praise from prominent Jewish leaders, including Golda Meir, as less than sincere; an attempt to secure Vatican recognition of the State of Israel. Zuccotti, in a similar vein, has written that

after the war, leaders of the Jewish community desperately wanted certain things from the pope. They hoped that he would issue a condemnation of anti-Semitism that would discourage a resurgence of that deadly scourge. (He never did so, even after some 1,500 Jewish survivors returning to their villages in Poland were murdered in local pogroms.) They desired Vatican recognition of the state of Israel. And they looked forward to sweeping changes in Church teachings about Jews in the declarations of Vatican II from 1962 to 1965. Given these additional motives, the objective of preserving historical truth was unfortunately sometimes overlooked. A glance at the credentials of the Jewish authors of two of the most influential (and inaccurate) postwar defenses of the pope will clarify this point. The first, Joseph Lichten, was a Polish-born diplomat who served in the embassy of the Polish government in exile in Washington during the war. In 1945, he joined the Anti-Defamation League of B’nai B’rith in New York as director of the agency’s Intercultural Affairs Department, devoting himself to the improvement of Catholic–Jewish dialogue. His profoundly erroneous article ‘Pius XII and the Jews’ was published in the ADL Bulletin in October 1958 and in The Catholic Mind in March–April 1959. An equally distorted article, ‘A question of judgment’, first appeared in 1963, at the time of the second Vatican Council. The second author, Pinchas Lapide, fought in Italy with the Jewish Brigade. In the 1960s, he was the Israeli consul in Italy and was, like Lichten, deeply interested in the Jewish clauses then being considered at the sessions of the Vatican Council.

== Historiography ==
=== Early accounts ===
Early literature on the wartime leadership of Pius was positive, including Halecki and Murray's Pius XII: Eugenio Pacelli, Pope of Peace (1954) and Nazareno Padellaro's Portrait of Pius XII (first published in Italian in 1949). Later, more critical accounts were written.

Pius died in October 1958. In 1959 the German bishops issued a series of statements regarding the Holocaust which acknowledged German guilt, in particular that of Catholics and their bishops. Michael Phayer considered it no accident that they waited until Pius's death before speaking out and that all those who had not kept silent were post-war appointees. During Adolf Eichmann's much publicized trial in 1960 a question arose relating to the Vatican's knowledge of the Holocaust and if Pius's refusal to speak out was based on fears on what would happen to German Catholics. This sparked public debate in Germany on the relationship of the Church to the Holocaust; Michael Phayer identifies this as when Pius's high repute began to wane.

E. W. Bockenforde's article published in the Catholic periodical "Hochland" in 1961 resulted in vehement attacks by many Catholics. In 1962 the historian Friedrich Heer commented that "In 1945 the situation was so critical that only a gigantic attempt at concealment was... able to save and restore the face of official Christianity in Germany... I have to confess that all Catholics, from the highest to the lowest – priest, chaplains, laymen (anti-Semitic to this day) – are co-responsible for the mass murder of the Jews."

In 1960 Guenter Lewy began work on his book "The Catholic Church and Nazi Germany", combing the records of the German diocesan, State and party archives, and finally publishing the work in 1964. Though recognising that the Church is hierarchical, it is not immune to the influence of its branches and therefore he does not focus purely on the role of Pius. (Note: Lewy considers the possibility that Pius speaking out might have made things worse but wrote "no amount of casuistry about silence in the face of a crime that is permissible in order to prevent worse will alleviate the arduous task of search for it. Situations exist when moral guilt is incurred by omission. Silence has its limits." (Cornwell (1999), p. 377)) Lewy wrote "It is symptomatic of the boldness with which some Catholic writers after 1945 have falsified important documents from the Nazi period."

In 1963, Rolf Hochhuth's play The Representative (or The Deputy) depicted Pius as an antisemite and indifferent to the Holocaust. The depiction was called "unhistorical" and lacking "credible substantiation" by the Encyclopedia Britannica. John Cornwell, himself a critic of Pius, described the play as "historical fiction based on scant documentation" and "is so wide of the mark as to be ludicrous".

Saul Friedländer, whose parents were murdered in Auschwitz, published his book Pius XII and the Third Reich in 1964, amidst the discussion prompted by The Deputy. It relied heavily on primary sources and concentrated on diplomatic correspondence between the Holy See and Germany. (Note: Friedländer concluded that "the Sovereign Pontiff seems to have had a predilection for Germany which does not appear to have been diminished by the nature of the Nazi regime and which was disavowed up to 1944". (Cornwell (1999), p. 376)) Friedländer hoped that the Vatican would open up its own archives, and in 1964 Paul VI commissioned a group of Jesuit scholars to edit and publish some of the Vatican's records. These were published in eleven volumes between 1965 and 1981.

Carlo Falconi published in 1965 "The Silence of the Pope" and followed this in 1967 with "The Popes of the Twentieth Century," in which he criticised Pius for "failing to speak out"; "he also was guilty of inadmissible silence about the millions of civilian victims of Nazism – Jews, Poles, Serbs, Russians, gypsies, and others". Joseph Bottum considers these early attacks, by Lewy, Friedländer, and Falconi, as "more serious and scholarly" and "by today's standards, quite moderate and thoughtful".

=== The Deputy ===
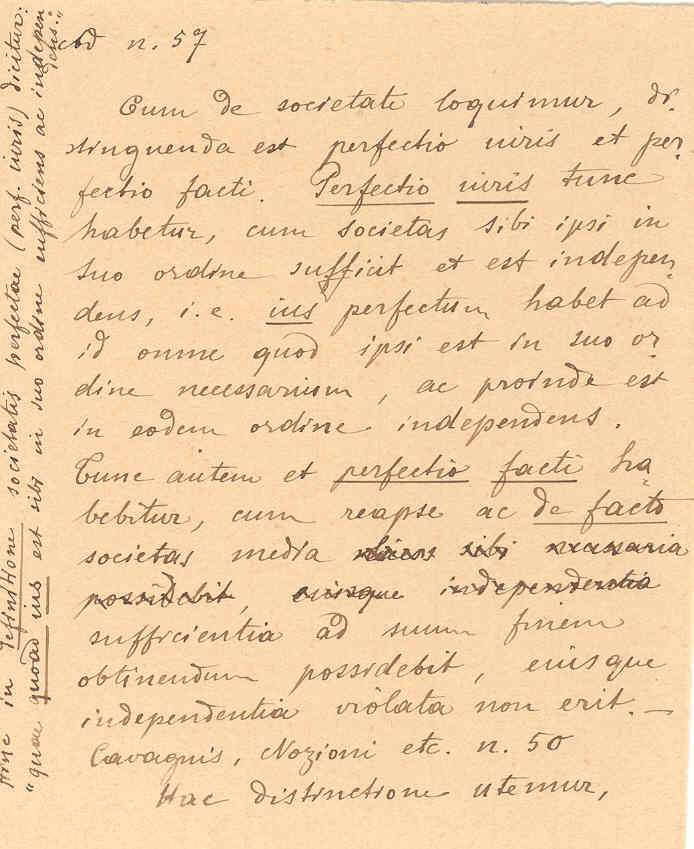
A rare 1899 handwriting of Eugenio Pacelli with text in Latin

In 1963, Rolf Hochhuth's drama Der Stellvertreter. Ein christliches Trauerspiel (The Deputy, a Christian tragedy, released in English in 1964) portrayed Pius XII as a hypocrite who remained silent about the Holocaust. Books such as Dr. Joseph Lichten's A Question of Judgment (1963), written in response to The Deputy, defended Pius's actions during the war. Lichten labelled any criticism of the pope's actions during World War II as "a stupefying paradox" and said, "no one who reads the record of Pius XII's actions on behalf of Jews can subscribe to Hochhuth's accusation". Scholarly works like Guenter Lewy's The Catholic Church and Nazi Germany (1964) also followed the publication of The Deputy. Lewy's conclusion was that "the Pope and his advisers—influenced by the long tradition of moderate anti-Semitism so widely accepted in Vatican circles—did not view the plight of the Jews with a real sense of urgency and moral outrage. For this assertion no documentation is possible, but it is a conclusion difficult to avoid." Carlo Falconi (1967) described Hochhuth's depiction as crude and inaccurate, but he does not accept the explanations put forward by apologists of Pius regarding his alleged silence. In particular he rejects the defence of not making things worse by public denunciation since no fate could have been worse than what the Jews were undergoing and that on the one occasion when bishops did speak out against the euthanasia of disabled people the Nazis backed down. He also rejected the defence that the Pope did not know what was happening since in his opinion this is directly contradicted by instances in which Pius did make diplomatic interventions. In 2002 the play was adapted into the film Amen.

An article on Jesuit Vatican journal La Civiltà Cattolica in March 2009 stated that the accusations that Hochhuth's play made widely known originated not among Jews but in the Communist bloc. It was Moscow Radio, on 2 June 1945, that first direct against Pius the accusation of refusing to speak out against the exterminations in Nazi concentration camps. It was also the first to call him "Hitler's Pope". The same journal during the pontificate of Pius was still accusing the Jews of being "Christ killers" and of indulging in ritual murder as late as 1942.

Defector and former Securitate General Ion Mihai Pacepa has stated that the play of Hochhuth and numerous publications attacking Pius as allegedly having been a Nazi sympathizer were fabrications from the KGB and Eastern bloc Marxist secret services leading a campaign to discredit the moral authority of the Church and Christianity in the West. Pacepa also claims that he was involved in contacting East bloc agents close to the Vatican in order to fabricate the story to be used for the attack against the wartime pope.

=== Recent literature ===
==== Hitler's Pope and The Myth of Hitler's Pope ====
Since the mid-1960s, the legacy of Pius in relation to the Holocaust has been the subject of literature both critical and supportive. Authors such as John Cornwell, Garry Wills, Michael Phayer, James Carroll, Susan Zuccotti and Daniel Goldhagen have written critical assessments, while Jewish writers such as Richard Breitman, David Dalin, Martin Gilbert, Pinchas Lapide, Jeno Levai and Michael Tagliacozzo, as well as non-Jewish authors such as Pierre Blet, Antonio Gaspari, Robert Graham, Peter Gumpel, Margherita Marchione, Michael O'Carroll, Piertro Palazzini, Kenneth Whitehead, Ralph McInerny, Michael Feldkamp, M. L. T. Brown and Andrea Tornielli, have written that he worked to aid Jews during the war.

In 1999, John Cornwell's Hitler's Pope was highly critical of Pius, arguing that he had not "done enough" or "spoken out enough" against the Holocaust. Cornwell argued that Pius's entire career as nuncio to Germany, cardinal secretary of state, and pope was characterized by a desire to increase and centralize the power of the papacy and that he subordinated opposition to the Nazis to that goal. He further argued that Pius had anti-Jewish leanings and that this stance prevented him from caring about European Jews. (Cornwell's views evolved during the next five years (see below); he stated in 2004 that at that point he felt unable to judge Pius's wartime motives.) In an article in the Encyclopedia Britannica, St. John's University history professor Frank J. Coppa wrote that Cornwell's depiction of Pius as antisemitic lacked "credible substantiation". Kenneth L. Woodward, then religion editor at Newsweek and later writer-in-residence at the Lumen Christi Institute, wrote in his Newsweek review that "errors of fact and ignorance of context appear on almost every page". By contrast, Volker Berghahn, professor of history at Columbia University, wrote in his review in The New York Times, "By combining the painstaking research of other scholars with his own new documentation on Pius's knowledge and behavior during World War II, John Cornwell, a British journalist and research associate of Jesus College, Cambridge, makes a case in 'Hitler's Pope' that is very difficult to refute." Catholic priest and Seton Hall University history professor John F. Morley, while disagreeing with much of Cornwell's thesis, wrote that "this is a fascinating book which enlightens while it enrages, accuses while it challenges, offends while it searches for truth," and that

despite its serious flaws, Hitler’s Pope is a book that cannot, and should not, be ignored. Every point that Cornwell raises—whether it is Pacelli’s early career, his concordat negotiations, his spirituality and approach to the world, his refusal ever to explicitly criticize Nazi Germany, and his reaction to the Holocaust—is a matter of crucial concern to Catholics. For Catholics to gloss over Pius’s actions as if there were no problems, no evidence of short-sightedness, no sacrificing of one principle for another, no infatuation with the notion of the church triumphant, denies the moral purpose of historical study. Pius XII cannot be seen to be above criticism.

Cornwell's work was the first to have access to testimonies from Pius's beatification process as well as to many documents from Pacelli's nunciature that had just been opened under the seventy-five year rule by the Vatican State Secretary archives. Some praise of Cornwell referenced his disputed claim that he was a practising Catholic who had attempted to absolve Pius with his work.

Susan Zuccotti's Under His Very Windows: The Vatican and the Holocaust in Italy (2000) and Michael Phayer's The Catholic Church and the Holocaust, 1930–1965 (2000) provided further critical analyses of Pius' legacy.

In 2005, Jesuit historian Vincent Lapomarda wrote:

Recent works by José M. Sánchez, Pius XII and the Holocaust (2001) and Justus George Lawler's Popes and Politics (2002) show how really outrageous are the positions of many of those who have attacked Pope Pius XII. To condemn Pius for not seizing every opportunity to protest the crimes against the Jews overlooks the fact that he could not even save his own priests. What is amazing is that the Catholic Church under the Pope's leadership did far more to help Jews than any other international agency or person ...

— Vincent A. Lapomarda, The Jesuits and the Third Reich

A number of authors have written favorable accounts of the Pius, including Margherita Marchione's Yours Is a Precious Witness: Memoirs of Jews and Catholics in Wartime Italy (1997), Pope Pius XII: Architect for Peace (2000) and Consensus and Controversy: Defending Pope Pius XII (2002); Pierre Blet's Pius XII and the Second World War, According to the Archives of the Vatican (1999); and Ronald J. Rychlak's Hitler, the War and the Pope (2000). Ecclesiastical historian William Doino, author of The Pius War: Responses to the Critics of Pius XII, wrote that Pius was "emphatically not silent".

In specific riposte to Cornwell's moniker, American rabbi and historian David Dalin published The Myth of Hitler's Pope: How Pope Pius XII Rescued Jews from the Nazis in 2005, which endorsed previous accounts of Pius having been a savior of thousands of Europe's Jews. Historian Martin Gilbert wrote that Dalin's work was "an essential contribution to our understanding of the reality of Pope Pius XII's support for Jews at their time of greatest danger. Hopefully, his account will replace the divisively harmful version of papal neglect, and even collaboration, that has held the field for far too long."

Five years after the publication of Hitler's Pope, Cornwell stated: "I would now argue, in the light of the debates and evidence following Hitler's Pope, that Pius XII had so little scope of action that it is impossible to judge the motives for his silence during the war, while Rome was under the heel of Mussolini and later occupied by Germany." In his preface to the 2008 edition of Hitler's Pope, on the other hand, Cornwell wrote,

I believe now, as I did when this book was first published, that Eugenio Pacelli was Hitler's Pope not because he favored Hitler (which he did not) nor because he was anti-Semitic (which he was not, although he displayed an anti-Jewishness typical among Catholics of his times), but because he was an ideal church leader for Hitler's purposes... The crucial narrative center of gravity of my account of Pacelli's life is not the wartime period, but the early 1930s, when, as cardinal secretary of state with wide executive authority for the conduct of Vatican-German relations, he entered into a series of negotiations with Hitler, culminating in a Reich Concordat.

In 2009, moreover, Cornwell wrote of "fellow travellers," i.e., those priests in Nazi Germany who accepted the benefits that came with the Reichskonkordat but who failed to condemn the Nazi regime. He cites Cardinal Pacelli (the future Pius XII) as an example of such a "fellow traveller," who was willing to accept the generosity of Hitler in the educational sphere, so long as the Church withdrew from the social and political sphere, at the same time as Jews were being dismissed from universities and Jewish pupil places were being reduced. For this he considers Pacelli as effectively having been in collusion with the Nazi cause, if not by intent. He further argues that Monsignor Kass, who was involved in negotiations for the Reichskonkordat and at that time was the head of the Roman Catholic Centre Party, persuaded his party members, with the acquiescence of Pacelli, in the summer of 1933 to enable Hitler to acquire dictatorial powers. He argues that the Catholic Centre Party vote was decisive in the adoption of dictatorial powers by Hitler and that the party's subsequent dissolution was at Pacelli's prompting.

=== Controversy – "The Pius Wars" ===
There have been many books published on the subject of Pius and the Holocaust, often coupled with heated debate, such that it has been described as the "Pius Wars".

Michael Burleigh wrote, "Making use of the Holocaust as the biggest moral club to use against the Church, simply because one does not like its policies on abortion, contraception, homosexual priests or the Middle East, is as obscene as any attempt to exploit the deaths of six million European Jews for political purposes." (Note: Ralph McInerny also linked it to contemporary hatred of the Church’s stand against abortion; David Dalin argued that it was an intra-Catholic fight over the future of the papacy, with the Holocaust being merely used as a tool.)

A spokesperson for the nineteen Catholic scholars who wrote a letter to Pope Benedict XVI in 2010 asking that the process of sainthood for Pius XII be slowed down, and which asserted that "Pope Pius XII did not issue a clearly worded statement, unconditionally condemning the wholesale slaughter and murder of European Jews", affirmed that "We're all practicing Catholics. We're faithful to the Holy Father."

Joseph Bottum cites Philip Jenkins opinion that criticisms are not really about Pius XII: "Philip Jenkins understands it as not particular to Pius XII at all, but merely a convenient trope by which American commentators express what he calls an entirely new form of anti-Catholicism. Others see it in a continuum of more old-fashioned American distaste for the Whore of Babylon that dwells in Rome, spinning Jesuitical plots."

Daniel Goldhagen describes defenders of the Church using Pius as a lightning rod to divert peoples attention away from the broader issues, focusing attention on favorable points and concealing others. He further argues that those who use a person's identity as a Jew, Catholic or German as a tool to further their cause betray a great deal about themselves as such tactics are often used to stifle sober debate by switching attention away from the truth as exemplified by the charge of "anti-Catholicism" by apologists. (Note: See also Goldhagen (2002), pp. 393–423 for extended analysis of Goldhagen's opinion of how defenders of Pius and the Church have attacked him.) Daniel Goldhagen notes Father Peter Gumpel's comments that describes opponents of Pius as the "Jewish faction" which has something against Catholics. (Note: Gumpel responded that he had many Jewish friends and his comments were not addressed to Jews in general but noting "Some Jews have greatly damaged the Catholic Church." Gerhard Bodendorfer, the head of an Austrian Christian-Jewish dialogue group, protested that Father Gumpel's comments "came out of the lowest drawer of anti-Semitism".)

Garry Wills acknowledges that Pius's response to the Holocaust may have been founded on a sincere, if mistaken, belief that he was doing the correct thing. However, he deprecates arguments "defending Pius with false readings of history" and for "distortions by which the Vatican tries to deny its own sorry story with regard to the Jews. Pius's denial of his own silence, perpetrated by those who must make false claims in order to defend the words of a saint, would make him the source of a new round of deceit structured into past dishonesties."

== International Catholic-Jewish Historical Commission ==
In 1999, in an attempt to address some of this controversy, the International Catholic-Jewish Historical Commission (Historical Commission), a group of three Catholic and three Jewish scholars was appointed, respectively, by the Holy See's Commission for Religious Relations with the Jews (Holy See's Commission) and the International Jewish Committee for Interreligious Consultations (IJCIC), to whom a preliminary report was issued in October 2000.

The Commission did not discover any documents, but had the agreed-upon task to review the existing Vatican volumes, that make up the Actes et Documents du Saint Siege (ADSS) The Commission was internally divided over the question of access to additional documents from the Holy See, access to the news media by individual commission members, and, questions to be raised in the preliminary report. It was agreed to include all 47 individual questions by the six members, and use them as Preliminary Report. In addition to the 47 questions, the commission issued no findings of its own. It stated that it was not their task to sit in judgement of the Pope and his advisers but to contribute to a more nuanced understanding of the papacy during the Holocaust.

The 47 questions by the six scholars were grouped into three parts:

- (a) 27 specific questions on existing documents, mostly asking for background and additional information such as drafts of the encyclical Mit brennender Sorge, which was largely written by Eugenio Pacelli.
- (b) Fourteen questions dealt with themes of individual volumes, such as the question how Pius viewed the role of the Church during the war.
- (c) Six general questions, such as the absence of any anti-communist sentiments in the documents.

The disagreement between members over additional documents locked up under the Holy See's 70 year rule resulted in a discontinuation of the Commission in 2001 on friendly terms. Unsatisfied with the findings, Dr. Michael Marrus, one of the three Jewish members of the Commission, said the commission "ran up against a brick wall. ... It would have been really helpful to have had support from the Holy See on this issue."

== Yad Vashem controversy ==
An inscription at Yad Vashem states that Pius's record during the Holocaust was controversial, and it also states that he negotiated a concordat with the Nazis, maintained the Vatican's neutrality during the war. Formerly it stated that he took no initiatives to save Jews.

In 1985, Pietro Palazzini was honored by the museum, where he protested the repeated criticisms against Pius, on whose instructions Palazzini declared to have acted. Palazzini, a theological advisor to the Pontiff, had taught and written about the moral theology of Pope Pius XII.

David G. Dalin argues in The Myth of Hitler's Pope that Yad Vashem should honor Pius as a "Righteous Gentile", and documents that Pius was praised by all the leading Jews of his day for his role in saving more Jews than Oskar Schindler.

David Rosen has taken exception to the caption, stating when Pius died both Moshe Sharett and Golda Meir sent telegrams stating that when darkness reigned over Europe, he was one of the few who raised his voice in protest. "What Yad Vashem says is not necessarily wrong," conceded Rosen, "but it doesn't give us all the information." Rabbi Rosen later quoted historian Martin Gilbert, who says that Pius saved thousands of Jews.

In light of recent developments and research, on 1 July 2012, Yad Vashem changed the inscription to note a "considerable number of secret rescue activities" by the Church. Whereas the old text claimed the Pope "did not intervene" in the deportation of Jews from Rome, the new inscription says that he "did not publicly protest". The display also added text from Pius' Christmas 1942 radio speech in which he speaks of "hundreds of thousands of persons who, without any fault on their part", were killed, but it also points out that he did not specifically name the Jews. The new wording also removed the former claim that Concordat was signed "even at the price of recognizing the Nazi regime". Yad Vashem indicated that the new inscription is due to "research that has been done in the recent years and presents a more complex picture than previously presented", including in part the opening of the Pope's archives.

== We Remember: A Reflection on the Shoah ==
In 2000, Pope John Paul II, on behalf of all people, apologized to Jews by inserting a prayer at the Western Wall that read "We're deeply saddened by the behavior of those in the course of history who have caused the children of God to suffer, and asking your forgiveness, we wish to commit ourselves to genuine brotherhood with the people of the Covenant."

This papal apology, one of many issued by John Paul for past human and Church failings throughout history, was especially significant because John Paul emphasized Church guilt for, and the Second Vatican Council's condemnation of, antisemitism. The papal letter We Remember: A Reflection on the Shoah urged Catholics to repent "of past errors and infidelities" and "renew the awareness of the Hebrew roots of their faith".

== Developments since 2008 ==
A special conference of scholars on Pius XII on the 50th anniversary of his death was held in Rome on 15–17 September 2008, by Pave the Way Foundation. Pope Benedict XVI held a reception for the conference participants on 19 September 2008 where he stated that Pius made every effort to save Jews during the war. A second conference was held on 6–8 November 2008 by the Pontifical Academy for Life.

On 9 October 2008, the 50th anniversary of Pius's death, Benedict XVI celebrated pontifical mass in his memory. Shortly prior to, and after the mass, dialectics continued between some Jewish religious leaders and the Vatican as Rabbi Shear Yeshuv Cohen of Haifa addressed the Synod of Bishops and expressed his disappointment towards Pius XII's "silence" during the war.

The CRIF, an organization which represent Jews in France, has opposed the beatification of Pius XII.

In a self-penned article in the New York Daily News, Gary Krupp of the Pave the Way Foundation described how he and fellow researchers had discovered many documents detailing little-known activities of Pacelli from early in his career and later as Pius in which he gave assistance to Jews and wrote that "it's time for our 'historians' to correct this academic negligence and honestly research the open archives". He also wrote "We must acknowledge what Pius actually did rather than criticize him for what he should have done. Pope Pius should be commended for his courageous actions that saved more Jewish lives than all the world's leaders combined."

The methodology of Pave the Way Foundation relating to the historical record of Pope Pius XII has been subject to harsh criticism from many scholars and long-established Jewish organizations. Professor Dwork, Rose Professor of Holocaust History and Director of the Strassler Center for Holocaust and Genocide Studies at Clark University, said Krupp's research was "amateurish, worse than amateurish — risible" and that "He may be well-meaning, but his lack of experience in international affairs and historical research makes Mr. Krupp highly vulnerable to being manipulated by factions inside the Vatican."

In February 2010 nineteen Catholic scholars of theology and history asked Pope Benedict XVI to slow the process of the sainthood cause of Pope Pius XII. The scholars said existing research "leads us to the view that Pope Pius XII did not issue a clearly worded statement, unconditionally condemning the wholesale slaughter and murder of European Jews" and "At the same time, some evidence also compels us to see that Pius XII's diplomatic background encouraged him as head of a neutral state, the Vatican, to assist Jews by means that were not made public during the war. It is essential that further research be conducted to resolve both these questions".

On 1 July 2012, Yad Vashem changed the inscription regarding Pius to soften its criticism and admit rescue efforts by the Vatican. Yad Vashem indicated that the new inscription is due to "research that has been done in the recent years and presents a more complex picture than previously presented".

In September 2023, Corriere della Sera published a newly discovered documentation from the Vatican archives showing that a German Jesuit had informed the pope of the Holocaust.

== See also ==
- Antisemitism in Christianity
- Catholic Church and Judaism
- Catholic Church and Nazi Germany
- Catholic resistance to Nazi Germany
- Nazi persecution of the Catholic Church
- Pius Wars
- Pontifical Commission for Religious Relations with the Jews
- Pope Pius XII and Judaism
- Pope Pius XII and the raid on the Roman ghetto
- Pope Pius XII and the Roman razzia
- Rescue of Jews by Catholics during the Holocaust

== Bibliography ==
- Bokenkotter, Thomas S. (2004). A Concise History of the Catholic Church. Doubleday. ISBN 978-0-385-50584-0.
- Burleigh, Michael (2006). Sacred causes: religion and politics from the European dictators to Al Qaeda. HarperPress. ISBN 9780060580957.
- Chadwick, Owen (1988). Britain and the Vatican During the Second World War. Cambridge University Press. ISBN 978-0-521-36825-4.
- Cornwell, John (1999). Hitler's Pope: The Secret History of Pius XII. Penguin. ISBN 978-0-14-029627-3.
- Dalin, David G. (2005). The Myth of Hitler's Pope: Pope Pius XII And His Secret War Against Nazi Germany. Regnery. ISBN 978-1-59698-185-0.
- Falconi, Carlo (1967). The Popes in the Twentieth Century: from Pius X to John XXIII. Weidenfeld & Nicolson.
- Falconi, Carlo (1970). The Silence of Pius XII. Little, Brown. ISBN 0-571-09147-4.
- Friedländer, Saul (2007). The Years of Extermination: Nazi Germany and the Jews, 1939-1945. Weidenfeld & Nicolson. ISBN 978-0-297-81877-9.
- Gilbert, Martin (1987). The Holocaust: A History of the Jews of Europe During the Second World War. Henry Holt and Company. ISBN 978-0-8050-0348-2.
- Goldhagen, Daniel Jonah (2002). A Moral Reckoning: The Role of the Church in the Holocaust and Its Unfulfilled Duty of Repair. Knopf Doubleday Publishing Group. ISBN 978-0-307-42444-0.
- Gutman, Israel (1990). Encyclopedia of the Holocaust. Macmillan. ISBN 978-0-02-896090-6.
- Hilberg, Raul (2003) [1961]. The Destruction of the European Jews. Vol. I (3rd ed.). Yale University Press. ISBN 978-0-300-09557-9.
- Hoffmann, Peter (1996). History of the German Resistance, 1933-1945. McGill-Queen's University Press. ISBN 978-0-7735-1531-4.
- Johnson, Paul (1976). A History of Christianity. Atheneum. ISBN 978-0-689-70591-5.
- Kertzer, David I. (2002). Unholy War: The Vatican's Role in the Rise of Modern Anti-semitism. Macmillan. ISBN 978-0-333-78042-8.
- Lapide, Pinchas (1967). Three Popes and the Jews. Hawthorn Books.
- Lewy, Guenter (1964). The Catholic Church And Nazi Germany. McGraw-Hill. ISBN 9780297169215.
- Lichten, Joseph L. (1963). A question of judgment: Pius XII and the Jews. National Catholic Welfare Conference.
- McInerny, Ralph (2001). The Defamation of Pius XII. St. Augustine's Press. ISBN 978-1-890318-66-6.
- Morley, John F. (1980). Vatican Diplomacy and the Jews During the Holocaust 1939-1943. New York: KTAV. ISBN 978-0-87068-701-3.
- Passelecq, Georges; Suchecky, Bernard (1998). The Hidden Encyclical of Pius XI. Harcourt Brace. ISBN 978-0-15-600631-6.
- Perl, William R. (1989). The Holocaust Conspiracy: An International Policy of Genocide. SP Books. ISBN 978-0-944007-24-2.
- Phayer, Michael (2000). The Catholic Church and the Holocaust, 1930–1965. Bloomington and Indianapolis: Indiana University Press. ISBN 9780253214713.
- Phayer, Michael (2008). Pius XII, the Holocaust, and the Cold War. Bloomington and Indianapolis: Indiana University Press. ISBN 9780253349309.
- Pius XII (20 October 1939). "Summi Pontificatus". Libreria Editrice Vaticana.
- Rychlak, Ronald J. (2000). Hitler, the War, and the Pope. Our Sunday Visitor. ISBN 978-1-58571-006-5. Also see Amazon Online Reader
- Sánchez, José M. (2002). Pius XII and the Holocaust: Understanding the Controversy. CUA Press. ISBN 978-0-8132-1080-3.
- Shirer, William L. (1960). The Rise and Fall of the Third Reich. New York: Simon & Schuster. LCCN 60-6729.
- Wills, Garry (2000). Papal Sin: Structures of Deceit. Crown Publishing Group. ISBN 978-0-385-50477-5.
- Zuccotti, Susan (2000). Under His Very Windows: The Vatican and the Holocaust in Italy. Yale University Press. ISBN 978-0-300-08487-0.
- The Vatican and the Holocaust: A Preliminary Report (Report). International Catholic-Jewish Historical Commission. 31 October 2000.
