= Pope Pius XII and the raid on the Roman ghetto =

Overview of the relationship between Pope Pius XII and the raid on the Roman ghetto

Pope Pius XII's response to the Roman razzia ("roundup"), or mass deportation of Jews, on October 16, 1943, to Auschwitz, where almost all the deportees were murdered, is a significant issue relating to Pius and the Holocaust.

Under Mussolini, no policy of abduction of Jews had been implemented in Italy. Following Italy's capitulation to the Allies in 1943, Nazi forces invaded and occupied much of the country and began deportations of Jews to extermination camps. The Vatican protested at diplomatic levels, but Pius himself did not offer any public protests. Several thousand Jews found refuge in Catholic networks, institutions and homes, including in Vatican City and Pius's Summer Residence. The Catholic Church and some historians have credited this rescue in large part to the Pius's own direction. However, historian Susan Zuccotti researched the matter in detail and states that there is "considerable evidence of papal disapproval of the hiding of Jews and other fugitives in Vatican properties." For example, after a 1944 Fascist raid on San Paolo Basilica found refugees, including Jews, hidden there, Church leadership ordered the canons (chaplains) and other members of the staff of St. Peter's who had been concealing fugitives in the Canonica, the canons' residence in the Vatican, to eject all of them. A number of cardinals asked Cardinal Rossi, who had ordered the expulsion, to change his mind, but he refused, stating that the order had come from Pius himself. The other clergy asked the Cardinal Secretary of State to intercede with Pius, who eventually relented.

Various historians have given differing emphases in their accounts of Pius's response to the razzia. According to historian Michael Phayer, "the question of the pope's silence has become the focus of intense historical debate and analysis" because the deportations occurred "under his very windows," a phrase also used in the title of a book on the subject by Zuccotti. The phrase is based on language used by Ernst von Weizsäcker, the German ambassador to the Vatican, who reported to Berlin that the razzia had taken place "under the Pope's windows." It also echoes the reported words of the protest made to Weizsäcker by the Vatican secretary of state on the morning of the roundup: "It is sad for the Holy Father, sad beyond imagination, that here in Rome, under the very eyes of the Common Father, that so many people should suffer only because they belong to a specific race."

Phayer's and Zuccotti's emphasis on "papal silence" can be contrasted with that on "papal action" by Jewish Holocaust historian Martin Gilbert, who wrote that when the Nazis came in search of Rome's Jews, Pius had already "A few days earlier... personally ordered the Vatican clergy to open the sanctuaries of the Vatican City to all 'non-Aryans' in need of refuge." (Gilbert's citation to back up this statement is to a page in Meir Michaelis's book Mussolini and the Jews; however, the relevant sentence by Michaelis - "But as soon as Weizsacker informed the Curia of Hitler’s decision to respect and safeguard the extra-territorial status of the Vatican City and its multitude of enclaves, Pius XII personally ordered the clergy to open these sanctuaries to all non-Aryans in need of refuge.” - does not itself have a citation or reference.)

Zuccotti argues that there is no written evidence of this supposed papal directive and that claims of its existence only appeared after the 1963 production of a play critical of Pius' failure to protest the Holocaust. Gary Krupp, a retired medical-equipment dealer who has become an outspoken defender of Pius, wrote that "it was not only normal but essential for any incriminating documents, even slips of paper, to be destroyed lest they fall into Nazi hands and endanger the carrier or the referee. In fact, as [writer Ronald] Rychlak points out, Zuccotti had spelt this out herself in an earlier book...: 'Any direct personal order would have had to be kept very quiet to protect those who were actually sheltered' ('The Italians and the Holocaust,' 1987)." Zuccotti has stated, however, that dangerous documents could be and indeed were "kept very quiet," i.e., hidden in churches, during the German occupation, and that "it is not difficult to hide a document somewhere in the Vatican City!" The days after the raid on San Paolo generated significant incriminating documentation - including information about the refugees housed in the St. Peter's Canonica and the priests who were hiding them - which not only was written down but was then retained in the Vatican archives. Zuccotti has commented, too, that a written papal order to conceal Jews, if such an order existed, would have been viewed as highly valuable, given the questions expected to be asked after the inevitable Allied victory.

== Lead up to roundups ==
=== Foreknowledge of Vatican ===
According to Phayer, there is no doubt that "Pius XII knew of the plan to murder Roman Jews." Phayer writes that Pius's under-secretaries of state Giovanni Montini and Domenico Tardini first learned of the planned deportations in mid-September 1943. Specifically, the Vatican learned of a "telegram from Berlin instructing the SS in Rome to seize the city's Jews" several weeks before the razzia began. According to historian and rabbi David G. Dalin, "A fair reading suggests Pius had heard rumors and raised them with the Nazi occupiers. Enza Pignatelli Aragona reported that when she broke in on the pope with the news of the roundup early on the morning of October 16, 1943, his first words were: "But the Germans had promised not to touch the Jews!"

=== Events prior to the razzia ===
in July 1943, following a series of disastrous defeats culminating in the Allied invasion of Sicily, Benito Mussolini was deposed. On 3 September 1943 the new government decided to capitulate to the United States and Great Britain and on 13 October 1943, the Kingdom of Italy officially joined the Allied Powers by declaring war on its former Axis partner Germany. In response, Hitler deployed increasing numbers of German troops into Northern Italy and the areas around Rome starting in early September. Up until this time, the Fascists who had dominated the Italian government had refused to cooperate with the efforts of their German allies to exterminate the Jews. It was clear to many German military and diplomatic officials that there was nothing to be gained (and much to be lost) by allowing a roundup and deportation of Italy's Jewish population. By October, "various members of the German military and diplomatic corps" were attempting to prevent the planned deportation of Rome's Jews. Weizsäcker took over from bishop Alois Hudal the task of compiling a comprehensive list of the properties of the pope in Rome and sending hundreds of "letters of protection" to those properties, guaranteeing them extraterritorial status. However, Weizsäcker delegated the task of actually warning the Roman Jewry to his assistant Albrecht von Kassel, who encountered great difficulty because of prevailing opinion, generated by Jews Dante Almansi and Ugo Foa, that there was "no cause for alarm." In any case, according to Phayer, "Pope Pius gave them no warning." In the end, very few Jews "availed themselves of opportunities to hide" before October 16. According to Zuccotti's research, there exists no evidence that "the populations of convents and monasteries surged before the fateful day", though Zuccotti's findings conflict with those of other accounts.

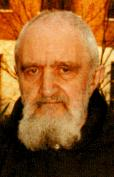
Father Père Marie-Benoît.

According to Gilbert, the pope had helped the Jews of Rome in September by contributing to the 50 kg of gold demanded by the Nazis. At the same time, wrote Gilbert, the Capuchin Father Benoit had saved large numbers of Jews by providing them with false identification papers, helped by the Swiss, Hungarian, Romanian and French embassies, and a number of Italian officials. Gilbert posited that a few days before the October 15–16 roundup, Pius personally directed Vatican clergy to open the sanctuaries of the Vatican to all "non-Aryans" in need of refuge.

According to Zuccotti, not only did Pius not aid the efforts of Father Benoît, he actively discouraged his work, providing no aid for his efforts to help the Jews escape Italian-occupied France in June 1943. With respect to Benoît's actions during the razzia, Zuccotti wrote, "far from claiming receipt of material aid from Vatican officials, Benedetto never even wrote that they encouraged him." Zuccotti further stated that Vatican officials actively attempted to "subdue" the efforts of Benoît and others, cautioning them against even meeting with Jews, with "whom it would be better to speak less." When Benoît asked Montini for a letter of recommendation that he needed in order to provide false documents to Jews, "he received little but a reprimand."

Dalin has queried Zuccotti's methodology and conclusions, writing, "There exists testimony from a Good Samaritan priest that Bishop Giuseppe Nicolini of Assisi, holding a letter in his hand, declared that the pope had written to request help for Jews during the German roundup of Italian Jews in 1943. But because the priest did not actually read the letter, Zuccotti speculates that the bishop may have been deceiving him — and thus that this testimony should be rejected. Compare this skeptical approach to evidence with her treatment, for example, of a 1967 interview in which the German diplomat Eitel F. Möllhausen said he had sent information to the Nazis' ambassador to the Vatican, Ernst von Weizsäcker, and 'assumed' that Weizsäcker passed it on to Church 'officials'. Zuccotti takes this as unquestionable proof that the pope had direct foreknowledge of the German roundup". (Dalin doesn't provide a reference for Zuccotti's having written that Möllhausen simply "assumed" Weizsäcker passed this information on to Church officials. In her book Under His Very Windows: The Vatican and the Holocaust in Italy, Zuccotti wrote, "The ambassador was eager to see that the Jews were privately warned and dispersed before they could be arrested. According to Möllhausen, Weizsäcker’s office therefore informed officials at the Vatican Secretariat of State of German plans for a roundup. These officials certainly notified the pope." Zuccotti's own reference is to Black Sabbath: A Journey through a Crime against Humanity by Robert Katz, who was the historian who conducted the 1967 interview with Möllhausen. In Black Sabbath, Katz wrote, regarding a telegram Möllhausen received saying Hitler had ordered that all of Rome's thousands of Jews be transported, "He passed it along to Weizsacker’s embassy, which in turn enlightened the Vatican.” Katz also wrote, summarizing his view of the situation as of October 6, "from that moment on the highest authorities of the Church, including Pope Pius XII, knew beyond any doubt that the Germans were planning to deport the Jews of Rome.”)

=== Pius agrees to lend Jews of Rome ransom demanded by SS ===
SS Lieutenant Colonel Herbert Kappler is "notorious for holding the Jews of Rome for ransom" due to his demand of 50 kilograms of gold, for which he was convicted of extortion by an Italian court after the war. In fact, it is possible that Kappler's intentions were to "bribe Berlin [rather] than to shake down the Jews." The Jews of Rome turned to the pope in an attempt to meet the ransom. Pius offered to loan the Jews the gold, with no deadline for repayment and no interest. However, this loan never took place because the Jews came up with the required amount on their own by 28 September. A German cable from 11 October, which does not mention their recent receipt of the extorted gold, ordered Kappler to proceed with the deportation as planned.

=== Actions of the German diplomatic corps ===
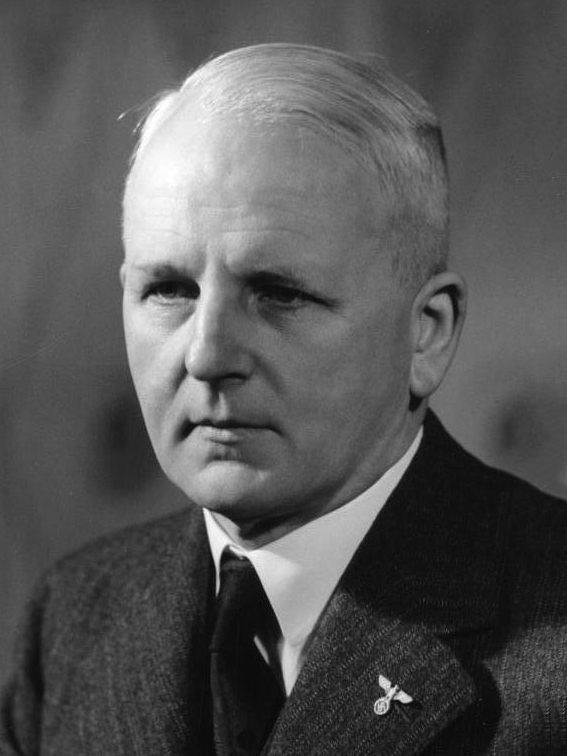
Ernst von Weizsäcker, the German ambassador to the Vatican

In addition to the opposition from Weizsäcker and von Kessel, the deportations were opposed by General Reiner Stahel, the commandant of Rome, Field Marshal General Albert Kesselring and Eitel Friedrich Möllhausen, German chargé d'affaires to Italy. Kappler suggested to the foreign ministry on October 6 that the Jews would be "better used as laborers in Italy," and Möllhausen communicated similar sentiments to Stahel. A second telegram the next day from Möllhausen to Berlin said that the field marshal had asked Kappler to postpone the roundup. Knowing that the German officials in Rome were unanimously opposed to the roundup, Adolf Eichmann sent Theodore Dannecker, the SS captain responsible for the deportations of the Parisian Jews, to Rome. Having a very limited force compared to the 8,000 Roman Jews, Dannecker pressed Kappler to provide him with additional forces and a list of addresses; both Kappler and Stahel complied.

== The razzia ==
=== Roundup, deportation and murder ===
The arrests began on October 16. The Germans surrounded the Roman Ghetto on Shabbat and went door-to-door in the early morning, waking up the sleeping Jews on their list of addresses. They were given 20 minutes to assemble their possessions and assemble outside in the rain. 1,000 Jews - 900 of whom were women and children, thereby eliminating any hope that the deportation might be to a labor rather than extermination camp - were taken to the Military College of Rome, only about one mile (1,6 km) from St Peter's Basilica. Gilbert wrote that the total Jewish population of Rome at that point was 6,730.

On October 18, the Jews in the Collegio Militare were forced into the unventilated cattle cars that were to transport them to Auschwitz. Owen Chadwick estimated the number of the deportees to Auschwitz at 1,007 and the number of survivors at 15.

Also on October 18, D'Arcy Osborne, the British ambassador to the Vatican, met with Pius. Osborne described Pius as "well and in good spirits" that day. Osborne reported, too, that Pius told him that "he had no grounds for complaint against General von Stahel and the German police who had hitherto respected neutrality."

=== The Hudal letter ===
On October 16, the day of the razzia, Cardinal Secretary of State Luigi Maglione asked that Weizsäcker meet with him to discuss the action and arranged for a telegram of protest to Berlin to be sent by pro-Nazi bishop Alois Hudal, rector of Santa Maria dell'Anima, the German and Austrian national church in Rome. Hudal became notorious after the war for masterminding the "ratlines" through which Nazi war criminals escaped justice in Europe, mostly to South America. According to the ADSS, the Hudal letter was conveyed to Berlin by Carlo Pacelli, the pope's nephew, through General Stahel.

The letter requested a suspension of the arrests, stating "otherwise I fear the Pope will take a position in public as being against this action, one which would undoubtedly be used by the anti-German propagandists as a weapon against us Germans." According to Albrecht von Kessel, Hudal did not write the letter but merely signed it after it was drafted primarily by von Weizsäcker, von Kessel, Gerhart Gumpel (another German diplomat in Rome) and even General Stahel himself. Weizsäcker sent a telegram to Berlin a few hours later vouching for the authenticity and argument of the letter. Phayer does not rule out the possibility of papal involvement with the letter, but suggests that if Pius was involved, the letter was designed "to rescue Jews without risking a papal statement of denunciation."

=== Maglione and Weizsäcker meeting ===
On the morning of the roundup, Maglione, on the orders of Pius, met with Weizsäcker. According to Phayer, the meeting "ranks as one of the most dramatic scenes of Holocaust historiography." The meeting received the attention of British historian Owen Chadwick and is often "taken center stage in accounts of the razzia in Rome." Phayer disagrees with Chadwick's assessment of the importance of the meeting.

By Gilbert's account, upon receiving news of the roundups on the morning of 16 October, the Pope immediately instructed Maglione to protest to Weizsäcker: "Maglione did so that morning, making it clear to the ambassador that the deportation of Jews was offensive to the Pope. In urging Weizsacker 'to try to save these innocent people,' Maglione added: 'It is sad for the Holy Father, sad beyond imagination, that here in Rome, under the very eyes of the Common Father, that so many people should suffer only because they belong to a specific race.'" Gilbert then writes - without citing a source - that after this meeting, Weizsäcker gave orders for a halt to the arrests.

Chadwick quotes a letter from D'Arcy Osborne to the Foreign Office from the last day of the month:

As soon as he heard of the arrests of the Jews in Rome the Cardinal Secretary of State sent for the German ambassador and formulated some sort [undecyphered word] of protest. The Ambassador took immediate action with the result that large numbers were released [...] Vatican intervention thus seems to have been effective in saving a large number of these unfortunate people.

However, it is now known that the releases to which D'Arcy Osborne referred were primarily of individuals who had some claim to be exempt from the genocide. Zuccotti, for example, has stated,

The Germans did indeed release more than 200 people, including non-Jews arrested by mistake, Jewish spouses and children from mixed marriages, and Jewish citizens of countries where deportations were not occurring. It was standard German policy at that time, at least in Western Europe, that these categories of people not be deported.

Lutz Klinkhammer, the Deputy Director of the German Historical Institute in Rome, has similarly written, about the Vatican's interventions on behalf of specific individuals who had been rounded up, "It is more than clear that all their efforts were aimed above all at saving the baptized or the 'half-Jews' born from mixed marriages."

Phayer wrote in 2008 that "nearly all" historians agree that Maglione did not protest the arrests of that morning in his meeting with Weizsäcker. Pius himself never spoke publicly of the razzia. On October 25, by which time most of the Jews who had been rounded up were probably dead or soon to enter the gas chamber, the Vatican's official newspaper, L'Osservatore Romano, ran an article saying that "the Holy Father's charity was universal, extending to all races." According to Gilbert, following Maglione's appeal, to protect Rome's remaining Jews from a possible German reversal, Pius gave instructions for the Vatican to be opened to the city's Jews, and for the convents and monasteries to provide hiding places or to provide false papers; Gilbert credits this papal initiative with a larger percentage of the Jews of Rome being saved than had been saved in any other city then under German occupation. However, whether or not Pius personally ordered that Jews be concealed has been the subject of considerable debate, with some historians arguing that the pope neither ordered nor in fact was entirely pleased with such shelter as was offered.

Weizsäcker wrote of the Vatican diplomacy on October 22 in a letter to his mother, saying "fortunately so far no one has taken a public position." According to Phayer, "historians—as opposed to writers whose sole objective is to defend Pius XII—are not in agreement with the editors of the Actes et Documents, who maintained that Maglione succeeded in registering a papal protest of the roundup of the Jews." According to Maglione's account of the meeting, when asked by Weizsäcker what the pope would do if these things were to continue, he replied that the Holy See did not wish to have to express disapproval, and when asked whether Weizsäcker should report the conversation to his superiors, he replied that he was "leaving it to his judgment."

Historian Michael Burleigh has defended the pope, writing acerbically that "critics of Pius, evidently unaware of such a thing as tactical lies, routinely alight upon [Weizsäcker's downplaying of the Pope's protests of the razzia]" as having done "considerable harm to the reputation of Pius XII". But Burleigh adds that "at the time [Pius' and Weizsäcker's diplomacy] served the more urgent end of diverting Berlin's malign attentions away from the thousands of Jews hidden in Catholic churches and private homes in Rome.... Such serpentine stratagems were as normal to those who had to negotiate these shoals at the time as they are alien to the academic moralists who deplore them with the luxury of hindsight. Even historians otherwise critical of Pius concede that the Germans would have had no hesitation in responding to an overt protest by invading the hundreds of Church properties where, in Rome alone, five thousand Jews were sheltered."

By contrast, the Catholic priest and Seton Hall University professor John Morley wrote, about the Vatican's response to the razzia:

Obviously, Maglione’s meeting with Weizsacker could have been considered a diplomatic protest, but the secrecy that surrounded it made it ineffectual... [The Jews deported from Rome to Auschwitz] are said to have been confident to the end that they would be rescued and freed through some papal action. The Vatican’s efforts on behalf of these Jews failed, principally because the steps taken were so slight as to be out of all proportion to the crime committed... [T]he German officials involved felt rather assured at this late date in the war that the Vatican would do nothing to jeopardize its relations with Germany. They had witnessed, likewise, a lack of concern by the Vatican for the fate of the Jews who had been deported from all the other countries. To deport Jews from Rome itself, under the eyes of the Pope, was risky, but they took the chance and in so doing proved that their impressions of Vatican diplomacy were correct. The greater tragedy, therefore, is not the death of a thousand innocent people, but that the diplomats of the Vatican, which claimed such a unique and spiritual status for their diplomacy, concurred by their silence. This was a concurrence which the Germans had come to expect and, in the most daring move of all, proved would also be forthcoming in Rome.

=== Sanctuary in monasteries, convents and Vatican City ===
A large number of Jews, perhaps more than 6,000, found refuge in the various religious properties of Rome, including in monasteries and convents; a much smaller number took refuge in Vatican City itself. It is clear from the number of letters of protection issued by Weizsäcker that many of the buildings possessing letters of protection (and asserting extraterritorial status) were in fact not owned by the Church.

Gilbert wrote that, in October 1943, with the SS occupying Rome and determined to deport the city's 5,000 Jews, the Vatican clergy had opened the sanctuaries of the Vatican to all "non-Aryans" in need of rescue in an attempt to forestall the deportation. "Catholic clergy in the city acted with alacrity," wrote Gilbert. "At the Capuchin convent on the Via Siciliano, Father Benoit, under the name of Father Benedetti, saved a large numbers of Jews by providing them with false identification papers [...] by the morning of October 16, a total of 4,238 Jews had been given sanctuary in the many monasteries and convents of Rome. A further 477 Jews had been given shelter in the Vatican and its enclaves." Gilbert credited the "rapid rescue efforts" of the Church as saving over four-fifths of Roman Jews that morning. Il Collegio San Giuseppe - Istituto De Merode, like other Roman Catholic schools, hid numerous Jewish children and adults among its students and brothers.

Pietro Palazzini, who was later appointed a cardinal and recognized as Righteous Among the Nations by Yad Vashem, endangered his life in his efforts to save the Jews of Rome. As assistant vice rector of the Seminario Romano (which was Vatican property), he hid Italian Jews for several months in 1943 and 1944. In accepting his title from Yad Vashem, Palazzini said that "the merit is entirely Pius XII's, who ordered us to do whatever we could to save the Jews from persecution."

In Under His Very Windows: The Vatican and the Holocaust in Italy, Zuccotti argued that the pope "did not give orders to the various Roman Catholic institutions of Rome to open their doors to the Jews". Zuccotti's other published works advance her argument that Pius neither ordered nor was aware of the full extent of the rescue operations carried out by Catholics and Catholic institutions. Zuccotti argues, in fact, that Pius disapproved of the rescue efforts, as evidenced by a December 1943 letter from the rector of the Seminario Romano, apologizing to Pius XII for accepting refugees, apparently having been previously reprimanded. Zuccotti also finds a February 1944 order to remove fugitives from Vatican properties inconsistent with the existence of a papal directive to save Jews. Phayer agrees with this interpretation while arguing that in fact "the Vatican cooperated in this rescue attempt," which he believes was initiated by the German diplomats of Rome. Zuccotti argues that any coordination was the result of the efforts of the Italian Jewish agency DELASEM, which petitioned Italian bishops and turned over funds and lists of names to those who agreed to help.

Jonathan Gorsky wrote for Yad Vashem that the scale of the rescue of Jews would have been impossible without papal approval: "The rescue of thousands of Jews during the Holocaust, and the opening of Catholic institutions as places of shelter, could not have occurred in the face of papal disapproval. This is especially true with regard to institutions within the confines of Rome and the Vatican... No one has denied the significant scale of Catholic rescue activity, and gratitude was indeed expressed by leading Jews after the war."

Robert Leiber, a close Jesuit adviser of Pius, asserted in 1961 that the pope personally ordered superiors of church properties to open their doors to Jews. For his statistics on the number of Jews whom he claimed Pius had saved, Leiber relied on fellow Jesuit Beato Ambord; the original compilation of the numbers is unknown. A more recent study by Dwork and Pelt concurs with Zuccotti, concluding: "Sam Waagenaar challenged Leiber. On the basis of our research, we find Waagenaar's refutation convincing. Pope Pius XII did nothing. Many convents and monasteries helped—but not to the extent that Pius's close associate Robert Leiber claimed."

Jews within the Vatican City State itself were "guests in the private apartments of individual prelates" who were in fact ordered to leave in a February 1944 order and were only allowed to stay after much uproar from the prelates in question.

In August 2006, extracts from the 60-year-old diary of a nun of the Convent of Santi Quattro Coronati were published in the Italian press, claiming that Pius XII had issued "the order to open the convents to the persecuted".

=== The Jews of Rome after the razzia ===
After the razzia and the deportation of its victims, Zuccotti has written,

there were no more ‘large-scale roundups’ in Rome, for the simple reason that all the Jews in the city now realized the danger they were in, and went into hiding. But the Nazis and their Fascist collaborators continued to hunt Jews as fiercely as they had done on 16 October. By the time Rome was liberated on 4 June 1944, at least another 657 Jewish men, women and children had been arrested in Rome and deported, mostly to Auschwitz, from where few returned. Their names and the dates of their arrest are all documented and published in Italy. [Picciotto Fargion, Il libro della memoria, p. 29.]

Over one-fifth (75 out of 335) of the Italians shot at close range by the Nazis on March 24, 1944 in what came to be known as the Ardeatine massacre were Jews being detained in Roman prisons.

== See also ==
- Raid of the Ghetto of Rome
- Pope Pius XII and the Holocaust
- Pope Pius XII and Judaism
- Catholic Church and Nazi Germany
- Israel Zolli, chief rabbi of Rome
