= Raid on the Roman Ghetto =

Event in the Holocaust

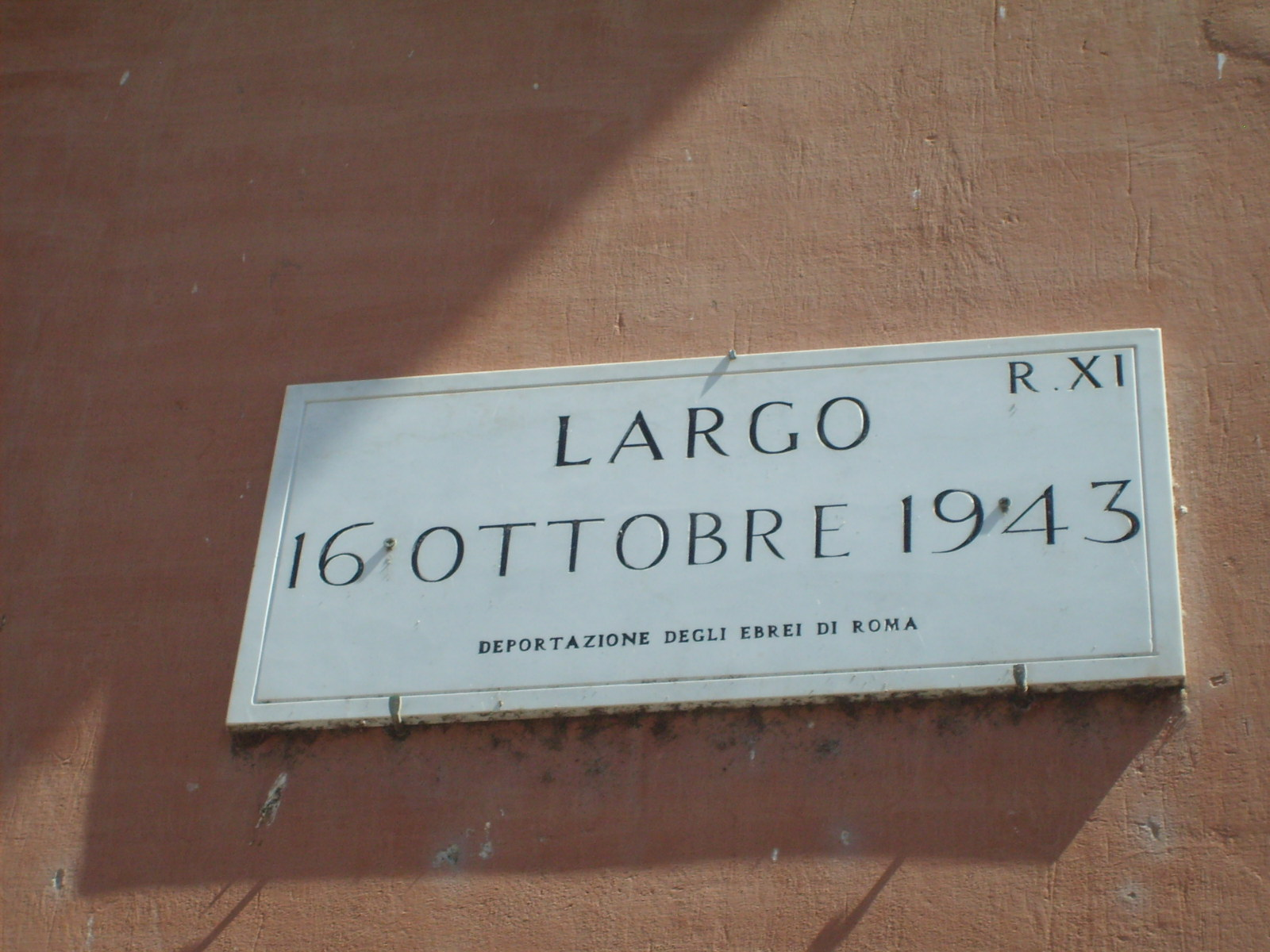
- Commemoration of the raid

- Raid on the Roman Ghetto (Rome)
- Location: 41°53′33″N 12°28′39″E; Roman Ghetto, Rome, Italy
- Date: 16 October 1943
- Target: Italian Jews and Jewish refugees
- Attack type: Arrest for deportation to extermination camps
- Deaths: 1,007 murdered in extermination camps
- Perpetrators: German and Italian security forces & police

The raid on the Roman Ghetto took place on 16 October 1943. A total of 1,259 people, mainly members of the Jewish community—numbering 363 men, 689 women, and 207 children—were detained by the Gestapo. Of these detainees, 1,023 were identified as Jews and deported to the Auschwitz concentration camp. Of these deportees, only fifteen men and one woman survived.

== Ghetto ==
The Ghetto of Rome was established as a result of the papal bull Cum nimis absurdum, issued by Pope Paul IV on the 14th of July, 1555. By the time of the raid, it was almost 400 years old and consisted of four cramped blocks around the Portico d’Ottavia, wedged between the Theatre of Marcellus, the Fontana delle Tartarughe, Palazzo Cenci, and the river Tiber.

== Prelude ==
When Nazi Germany occupied Rome two days after the Italian surrender on 8 September 1943, 8,000 Italian Jews were in Rome, one-fifth of all Jews in Italy. Many of those had moved south after the Allied landing, hoping to find safety from Nazi persecution.

The German military commander of Rome, General Reiner Stahel, was initially wary that any action against the Jews of Rome would draw condemnation from Pope Pius XII, of which he had been warned by Bishop Alois Hudal, rector of the German church in Rome. This condemnation, however, never materialised, which has led to considerable controversy. Stahel decided against ordering deportation without official authority from the German foreign ministry. Germany's Consul-General Eitel Friedrich Möllhausen went so far as to write to Foreign Minister Joachim von Ribbentrop in order to suggest that the Roman Jews be interned in Italian camps rather than deported, but Ribbentrop never dared to act against the Sicherheitsdienst (SD), from which Stahel received his orders. The role of the German ambassador to the Vatican, Ernst von Weizsäcker, in these events remains a matter of controversy.

On 26 September, Herbert Kappler, commander of the SS and the Gestapo in Rome, announced to the Jewish community in the city that unless they handed over 50 kilograms (110 lb) of gold, 200 Jewish family heads would be deported. The community delivered this sum on the deadline of midday, 28 September, with the assistance of the non-Jewish citizens of Rome. This left the Jewish community with the impression that the Germans were only after loot, especially the priceless treasures of the Biblioteca della Comunità Israelitica community library.

== Raid ==
On the morning of 16 October 1943, 365 German security and police forces (the Italian police were considered too unreliable) sealed off the Ghetto, which held a large part of the Jewish community at the time, turning it into a virtual prison. Theodor Dannecker, recently appointed chief of the Judenreferat in Italy and tasked with implementing the Final Solution, the genocide of the Jews, in Italy, had ordered the Ghetto to be cleared. Some Jews in the Ghetto managed to escape over rooftops.

In the raid, 1,259 people were detained, comprising 363 men, 689 women, and 207 children. Afterwards, non-Jewish prisoners were released while 1,023 Jews were taken to the Collegio militare in the Palazzo Salviati in Trastevere. Two days later, at least 1,035 prisoners were loaded onto Holocaust trains at Tiburtina station and deported to Auschwitz. Only 16 survived.

== Aftermath ==
At the time of the raid, the Italian racial laws (Italian: Leggi Razziali), were already promulgated by the Council of Ministers in Fascist Italy as from 1938 in order to enforce racial discrimination and segregation in the Kingdom of Italy. It restricted the civil rights of Italian Jews, banned books written by Jewish authors, and excluded Jews from public offices, education, most professions, and marriage with Italians. Additional laws stripped Jews of their assets, restricted travel, and finally provided for their confinement in internal exile. The deportation of Jews in Italy began on 8 September 1943, after German troops seized control of Northern and Central Italy, freed Benito Mussolini from prison, and installed him as the head of the puppet state of the Italian Social Republic.

During the German occupation, the Jews of Rome continued to live in hiding, under constant threat of arrest and deportation, until the liberation of the city by the Allies on 4 June 1944. In total, a quarter of the Jewish population of Rome—over 2,000 people—was deported, of which only 102 survived the Holocaust. Additionally, another 75 Roman Jews were murdered in the Ardeatine massacre, when 335 civilians were executed as a reprisal for a bombing attack on SS soldiers.

The Italian police in Rome, unlike in many other parts of German-occupied Italy, did not participate in the arrests of Jews, and the general public objected and resisted such arrests. For these reasons, a sizeable proportion of the Jews in Rome avoided arrest and survived the Holocaust, often hiding in the Vatican or other Catholic institutions.

Of the main perpetrators, Theodor Dannecker committed suicide following his capture in December 1945. Herbert Kappler was sentenced by a military court in 1948 to life imprisonment for his role in the Ardeatine massacre, escaped prison in 1977, and died less than a year later.

Pope Pius XII's role in the events has been the subject of considerable controversy, due to the proximity of the Vatican and the Roman Ghetto. According to Michael Phayer, "the question of the pope's silence has become the focus of intense historical debate and analysis" because the deportations occurred "under his very windows". The term "under his very windows" was used as the title of a book on the subject by American historian Susan Zuccotti. The phrase is based on an actual quotation from the report of Ernst von Weizsäcker, the German ambassador to the Vatican, who reported to Berlin that the razzia had taken place "under the Pope's windows". British historian Ian Kershaw wrote that "A strong and unequivocal protest from the Pontiff might well have deterred the German occupiers, unsure of the reactions, and prevented the deportations of the Jews they could lay their hands upon. The Germans were expecting such a protest. It never came." Catholic priest and historian John F. Morley similarly wrote that the Jews deported from Rome to Auschwitz

are said to have been confident to the end that they would be rescued and freed through some papal action. The Vatican’s efforts on behalf of these Jews failed, principally because the steps taken were so slight as to be out of all proportion to the crime committed.

Hungarian-American historian István Deák wrote that

it is hard not to feel that the Pope could have gone to the railroad station where the Jews were waiting, crammed in boxcars. If he had solemnly appeared at the station, in full regalia and with some of his colorful retinue, and if he had indicated that he was against deportation, he might have caused the release, according to Zuccotti, of the 1,023 Jews, mostly women and children; this seems possible since some 236 had already been released by the SS, for various reasons. At the very least, the news of such an unheard-of gesture would have spread in Europe, and Catholics everywhere might have had second thoughts about what their governments and they themselves were doing. Instead, the 1,023 Jews were sent to Auschwitz.

The assertion that the Pope could have prevented the raid is, however, rejected by some historians. Peter Longerich, a German historian of Nazi decision-making and the Holocaust, wrote, "There is no evidence that a public protest by the Pope would have led to a change in German policy toward the Jews. On the contrary, experience suggests that such protests often led to harsher measures." Similarly, Saul Friedländer stated "By the time the extermination policy was fully under way, no moral protest, however authoritative, was likely to stop it. The regime was pursuing what it saw as a redemptive mission." Martin Gilbert, drawing a parallel with a strong Catholic protest in another country, wrote that "The Dutch bishops’ protest of July 1942 did not save Jews from deportation. It resulted in the immediate arrest of Jewish converts who had previously been spared."

== Commemoration ==
A number of stone plaques have been unveiled in the Roman Ghetto and at Tiburtina railway station to commemorate the arrest and deportation of the Jews of Rome in October 1943.

== See also ==
- Gold of Rome, a 1961 Italian film based on related events
- History of the Jews in Italy
