= Joseph L. Lichten =

Polish-American lawyer (1906–1987)

- Born: Józef Lichtensztul; June 6, 1906; Warsaw, Poland
- Died: December 1, 1987 (aged 81); Rome, Italy
- Education: University of Warsaw
- Occupations: Lawyer, diplomat

Joseph L. Lichten (Polish: Józef L. Lichten) (June 6, 1906 – December 1, 1987) was a Polish-American lawyer and diplomat. He is known for his contributions in interfaith relations between Catholics and Jews.

== Early life and studies ==
Born Józef Lichtensztul in a Jewish family in Poland, he received his Doctor of Law degree from the University of Warsaw, and engaged in international diplomacy for the Polish government. He also obtained a PhD in Catholic canon law.

== Diplomatic career ==
From 1941 to 1945 he served as a consultant and advisor on eastern European affairs to the embassy of the Polish government in exile. When the Communists took control of his native country, he left its diplomatic service and became an American citizen.

== Interfaith work ==
In 1953, he participated in the very first interfaith conference sponsored by the Anti-Defamation League. He organized hundreds of such conferences over the years with prominent figures in the Catholic clergy and laity.

In 1963, shortly after the initial production of Rolf Hochhuth's play, The Deputy, and while serving as director of the International Affairs Department for the ADL, he wrote a monograph defending the actions of Pope Pius XII during the Second World War.

In 1986 Pope John Paul II named him a knight commander of the pontifical equestrian order of St. Gregory the Great for improving relations between the Church and society, the first American Jew to be so honored.

== Legacy ==
The Anti-Defamation League's Dr. Joseph L. Lichten Award in Catholic-Jewish Relations was established in 2005 to coincide with the 40th anniversary of Nostra aetate.
