= Brazilian Visa Project =

The Brazilian Visa Project is the name given by historians to the Catholic Church's project during World War II of allowing converted Jews to emigrate to Brazil in order to escape persecution in the European Theater of the war.

== 1939 petition to the Brazilian government ==
In March 1939, various members of the German Catholic hierarchy asked the newly elected Pope Pius XII to petition the Brazilian government for 3,000 immigration visas for German Catholic Jews to settle in Brazil. This was followed by two years of diplomatic exchanges, starting with an instruction form Cardinal Secretary of State Luigi Maglione to Benedetto Aloisi Masella, the nuncio in Rio de Janeiro, to request the visas from President Getúlio Vargas. The visas were formally conceded by Vargas, through Brazil's Conselho de Imigração e Colonização (CIC), on June 20, 1939.

== Strict conditions ==
From the very beginning, the visas came with strict conditions, "some necessary, others obstructionist", which grew stricter over time. The visas were available to baptized Jews in Germany and other countries, but were required to submit a recommendation from the nunciature of their respective country. The emigrants were further required to prove that their baptism had occurred before 1933. Protestant Jews were denied visas. Later conditions included a substantial monetary transfer to the Bank of Brazil and approval by the Brazilian Propaganda Office in Berlin.

== Role of Cardinal Innitzer ==
In the face of these many hurdles, Cardinal Theodor Innitzer of Vienna wrote to Pope Pius XII on February 4, 1941, asking for his immediate aid in granting the visas, in light of the beginning of deportation of 60,000 Jews of Vienna, at least 11,000 of whom had been baptized. A reply from Maglione outlined the various difficulties associated with such a step. Innitzer was not satisfied, and complained again later that month.

== Suspension of the program ==
The visa program was suspended on September 3, 1940 and officially ended on November 20, 1941. The fascist Spanish and Portuguese governments had already refused to issue travel visas for those using the immigration visas to Brazil. Innitzer updated the Holy See again on the increased pace of the deportations on May 20, 1942 and the Vatican tried for the last time to appeal to the Brazilian government in July 1942. Maglione wrote in December 1941 to the bishop whose request had initiated the project that: "as you have certainly been informed [...] many emigrants have departed and—I regret to say—from what I have been told, a good many of them, both by their improper conduct and alleged demands, have not corresponded to the concern which the Holy See has shown in their behalf".

== Lack of gratitude from visa recipients ==
The emphasis of Maglione's letter was not on the failure of a diplomatic effort, but chagrin at the alleged conduct and lack of gratitude of the recipients of the visas. According to the Encyclopedia of the Holocaust, by "improper conduct", Maglione could only have meant that the recipients had continued to practice Judaism.

== Number of visas ==
It is difficult to verify the exact number of visas that were issued. Only 1,000 visas were actually allocated to the Brazilian embassy in the Vatican, and most—although not all—were probably used. The remaining 2,000 in control of the Brazilian officials in Germany were never used, not even in the early months of the project. Maglione was "remarkably acquiescent" to the cancellation of the program and his response to the Brazilian ambassador about the possibility of reinstating the program in the future was "agonizingly impersonal and diplomatic".

== Attitude adopted by Pius XII ==
Morley views the importance of the Brazilian visa project as fourfold: first, in demonstrating the concern of Pius XII "primarily, almost exclusively" with baptized rather than unconverted Jews, and viewing their persecution primarily as an infringement on the rights of the Church; second, in exemplifying the reliance on diplomacy, even as "an end in itself"; and third, in showing the reluctance of the pope to disturb the status quo, "even when a staunchly Catholic country reneged on its promise to the Pope"; and finally, the use of prior failure as an "apologia" against later proposals to aid Jews.
