= Carlo Falconi =

Italian journalist and writer

- Born: October 20, 1915
- Died: September 24, 1998 (aged 82)
- Occupations: Journalist, writer
- Known for: Works on the history of the Roman Catholic Church and the Papacy
- Notable work: The Popes in the Twentieth Century (1967)

Carlo Falconi (20 October 1915 – 24 September 1998) was an Italian journalist and writer about Roman Catholicism.

Ordained as a Catholic priest in 1938, Falconi left the priesthood in 1949 and became a journalist.

The Kirkus Review said of The Popes in the Twentieth Century, "On the whole, then, the book is a readable and not uninteresting, but primarily subjective, history of the twentieth-century papacy, that will hold little appeal for a critical audience."

== Works ==
- Pope John and his council; a diary of the Second Vatican Council, September–December 1962, 1964
- The silence of Pius XII, 1965
- The Popes in the twentieth century, from Pius X to John XXIII, 1967.
