= Under His Very Windows =

2000 book by Susan Zuccotti

- Author: Susan Zuccotti
- Language: English
- Genre: Nonfiction
- Publisher: Yale University Press
- Publication date: 2000
- Publication place: United States

Under His Very Windows: The Vatican and the Holocaust in Italy (2000, Yale University Press) is a book by Susan Zuccotti which examines the role of the Catholic Church in providing aid to Jews in Italy during the Holocaust, and is critical of the actions of the papacy in this regard.

== The book ==
Zuccotti evaluates the actions of the Vatican and Popes Pius XI and Pius XII in Italy from 1938 and on to the Second World War, accusing the Popes of silence and characterising the actions the Vatican took to assist Jews as having been reprehensible. Zuccotti dismisses claims that Pope Pius was personally responsible for saving hundreds of thousands of Jews and argues that whatever help was given by the Church resulted from the personal courage of individual priests, monks and nuns, and prelates, rather than on direction from the Vatican.

The book contains a number of chapters dealing with aid provided by Catholics to Italy's Jews, but concludes that these acts were performed spontaneously. Zuccotti writes that Catholics who aided Jews, "invariably believed that they were acting according to the Pope’s will" but that there is no written evidence confirming that this was the case.

== Critical reception ==
According to a New York Times book review by Christopher Duggan of Reading University, the book is well researched, though Zuccotti follows the anti-Pius XII tone of Hitler's Pope by John Cornwell, and builds a case for the Pope having been antisemitic at heart – a view which, according to Duggan, available evidence "does not warrant".

Ronald J. Rychlak, author of Hitler, the War, and the Pope (Genesis) describes the book as controversial for conceding that the church provided aid to Jews and other refugees in Italy, but giving no credit to Pius XII for this, on the basis that she could find no written evidence to confirm his involvement.

In his review in The Tablet, (not to be confused with the Jewish magazine, Tablet), historian Owen Chadwick whose work focuses on Christianity and the Papacy, calls Under His Very Windows, "not history but guesswork." Chadwick's review states, "when the Germans occupied Italy she [Zucotti] thinks that the Pope could have informed church leaders that he would look favourably on help to the Jewish fugitives, and could have warned the Germans that he would protest forcibly and publicly at any deportations of Jews from Rome. All this is not history but guesswork, and one or two guesses have a more than minuscule improbability. "Faced with the certainty of papal condemnation, the Germans might possibly have postponed anti-Jewish actions in Italy", she suggests. Imagination boggles at what would have been said when such a message from the Pope was read at Hitler's headquarters, if it ever reached that height and if anyone round the table bothered to do more than laugh. Anyone who thinks otherwise should read the devastatingly uncompromising speech which Himmler made to SS leaders at Posen on a vital date for Italy, the beginning of October 1943."

== Awards ==
In 2000, the book won the National Jewish Book Award, in the category of Jewish–Christian Relations, and in 2002, the Sybil Halpern Milton Prize presented by the German Studies Association.

== See also ==
- Pope Pius XII and the Holocaust
