= List of classical secondary schools =

This list includes classical secondary schools. Classical schools are defined as those where pupils can study at least two ancient languages in junior secondary school such as grammar schools and gymnasiums. Liceo classico is a category of classical gymnasiums in Italy.

== Australia ==
- North Sydney Boys High School
- Sydney Boys High School
- Sydney Grammar School

== Austria ==
In Austria, too, there is a neo-humanist school tradition, established by Hermann Bonitz, similar to that in Germany. In the humanist stream of the Gymnasium, Latin can be chosen from the seventh year (Year 3) and Ancient Greek from the ninth year (Year 5). Schools with a particularly long tradition are known as ‘Akademisches Gymnasium’, but they also follow the curriculum of the humanist stream.

=== Lower Austria ===
- Stiftsgymnasium Melk
- Stiftsgymnasium Seitenstetten
- Gymnasium Sachsenbrunn
- Bundesgymnasium Babenbergerring

=== Upper Austria ===
- Akademisches Gymnasium (Linz)
- Bischöfliches Gymnasium Petrinum (Linz)
- Stiftsgymnasium Kremsmünster

=== Salzburg ===
- Akademisches Gymnasium Salzburg

=== Styria ===
- Akademisches Gymnasium (Graz)
- Bischöfliches Gymnasium Graz

=== Tirol ===
- Akademisches Gymnasium Innsbruck
- Bischöfliches Gymnasium Paulinum Schwaz

=== Vienna ===
- Akademisches Gymnasium
- Albertus Magnus-Gymnasium
- Döblinger Gymnasium
- Gymnasium Fichtnergasse
- Bundesgymnasium Wien 18 Klostergasse
- Gymnasium des Kollegiums Kalksburg
- Gymnasium Kundmanngasse
- Gymnasium Maroltingergasse
- Schottengymnasium
- Gymnasium Wasagasse
- Bundesgymnasium Wien 8

== Belgium ==
- Athénée Adolphe Max
- Collège Notre-Dame de la Paix (Namur), Wallonia
- Sint-Jozefscollege
- Sint-Lodewijkscollege

== Democratic Republic of Congo ==
- Collège Saint-Joseph in Bulango

== Croatia ==
- Klasična gimnazija u Zagrebu
- Privatna klasična gimnazija u Zagrebu
- Biskupijska klasična gimnazija Rugjer Josip Bošković u Dubrovniku

== France ==
- Lycée Henri IV
- Lycée Fustel de Coulanges (Strasbourg)
- Lycée Saint-François-Xavier (Vannes)

== Germany ==
These are mostly grammar schools with a strong sense of tradition and a long history. It is typical for them to offer Latin as the first foreign language from Year 5 onwards. With a few exceptions, Greek is no longer compulsory; as a third, and in rare cases a fourth, foreign language, it is either a compulsory elective or an optional subject. Some schools also offer Hebrew as an optional subject. Unlike modern foreign languages, which are taught as ‘languages of communication’, the focus in classical languages, as ‘languages of reflection’, is on linguistic understanding

Since the 1970s, the reformed upper secondary system has allowed pupils to opt out of certain subjects, meaning that the traditional grammar school streams now exist only to a limited extent. Today, they are best understood as a school profile determined by the school itself. The choice of a third foreign language is optional under the school laws of most federal states, which poses particular problems for Greek teaching in terms of finding enough motivated pupils at a challenging age.

=== Baden-Württemberg ===
Many grammar schools specialising in classical languages in Baden-Württemberg also offer the European Gymnasium programme.

- Gymnasium Hohenbaden Baden-Baden
- Kolleg St. Blasien
- Schönborn-Gymnasium Bruchsal
- St. Paulusheim, Bruchsal
- Johann-Vanotti-Gymnasium Ehingen
- Peutinger-Gymnasium Ellwangen
- Georgii-Gymnasium, Esslingen am Neckar
- Berthold-Gymnasium, Freiburg im Breisgau
- Friedrich-Gymnasium, Freiburg im Breisgau
- Kurfürst-Friedrich-Gymnasium Heidelberg
- Theodor-Heuss-Gymnasium Heilbronn
- Bismarck-Gymnasium Karlsruhe
- Heinrich-Suso-Gymnasium Konstanz
- Hebel-Gymnasium Lörrach
- Feudenheim-Gymnasium Mannheim
- Karl-Friedrich-Gymnasium Mannheim
- Evangelische Seminare Maulbronn und Blaubeuren
- Grimmelshausen-Gymnasium, Offenburg
- Ludwig-Wilhelm-Gymnasium, Rastatt
- Spohn-Gymnasium Ravensburg
- Albertus-Magnus-Gymnasium, Rottweil
- Heimschule Lender, Sasbach-Achern
- Landesgymnasium für Hochbegabte Schwäbisch Gmünd
- Kolleg St. Sebastian, Stegen
- Eberhard-Ludwigs-Gymnasium Stuttgart
- Karls-Gymnasium Stuttgart
- Reuchlin-Gymnasium Pforzheim
- Uhland-Gymnasium Tübingen
- Johannes-Kepler-Gymnasium Stuttgart

=== Bavaria ===
- Spessart-Gymnasium Alzenau
- Erasmus-Gymnasium Amberg
- Gymnasium Carolinum (Ansbach)
- Kronberg-Gymnasium Aschaffenburg
- Gymnasium bei St. Anna (Augsburg)
- Gymnasium bei St. Stephan (Augsburg)
- Franz-Ludwig-Gymnasium Bamberg
- Kaiser-Heinrich-Gymnasium Bamberg
- Gymnasium Christian-Ernestinum (Bayreuth)
- Robert-Schuman-Gymnasium Cham
- Gymnasium Casimirianum Coburg
- Johann-Michael-Sailer-Gymnasium Dillingen
- Gymnasium Donauwörth
- Gymnasium Fridericianum Erlangen
- Benediktinergymnasium Ettal
- Herder-Gymnasium Forchheim
- Dom-Gymnasium Freising
- Heinrich-Schliemann-Gymnasium Fürth
- Gymnasium Gars
- Jean-Paul-Gymnasium Hof
- Rainer-Maria-Rilke-Gymnasium Icking
- Reuchlin-Gymnasium Ingolstadt
- Jakob-Brucker-Gymnasium
- Hans-Carossa-Gymnasium Landshut
- St.-Michaels-Gymnasium der Benediktiner Metten
- Karlsgymnasium München-Pasing
- Ludwigsgymnasium (Munich)
- Maximiliansgymnasium München (Munich)
- Theresiengymnasium München (Munich)
- Wilhelmsgymnasium München (Munich)
- Wittelsbacher-Gymnasium München (Munich)
- Egbert-Gymnasium Münsterschwarzach
- Johann-Philipp-von-Schönborn-Gymnasium Münnerstadt
- Melanchthon-Gymnasium Nürnberg (Nuremberg)
- Neues Gymnasium Nürnberg (Nuremberg)
- Albrecht-Ernst-Gymnasium (Oettingen in Bayern)
- Gymnasium Leopoldinum Passau
- Albertus-Magnus-Gymnasium Regensburg
- Albrecht-Altdorfer-Gymnasium Regensburg
- Ignaz-Günther-Gymnasium Rosenheim
- Rhabanus-Maurus-Gymnasium St. Ottilien
- Gymnasium der Benediktiner Schäftlarn
- Celtis-Gymnasium Schweinfurt
- Johannes-Turmair-Gymnasium Straubing
- Augustinus-Gymnasium Weiden
- Gymnasium Weilheim
- Johann-Sebastian-Bach-Gymnasium Windsbach
- Wirsberg-Gymnasium Würzburg

=== Berlin ===
- Goethe-Gymnasium (Wilmersdorf)
- Gymnasium Steglitz (Steglitz)
- Heinrich-Schliemann-Gymnasium Berlin (Prenzlauer Berg)
- Europäisches Gymnasium Bertha von Suttner (Reinickendorf)
- Canisius-Kolleg Berlin (Tiergarten)
- Gymnasium zum Grauen Kloster (Schmargendorf)
- Schadow-Gymnasium (Zehlendorf)
- Französisches Gymnasium Berlin (Tiergarten)
- Heinz-Berggruen-Gymnasium (Westend)
- Arndt-Gymnasium Dahlem (Dahlem)

=== Brandenburg ===
- Evangelisches Gymnasium Hermannswerder (Potsdam)

=== Breme ===
- Altes Gymnasium (Bremen)

=== Hamburg ===
- Sankt-Ansgar-Schule (Borgfelde)
- Wilhelm-Gymnasium (Harvestehude)
- Christianeum (Othmarschen)
- Gelehrtenschule des Johanneums (Winterhude)

=== Hesse ===
- Stiftsschule St. Johann (Amöneburg)
- Kaiserin-Friedrich-Gymnasium (Bad Homburg vor der Höhe)
- Altes Kurfürstliches Gymnasium Bensheim
- Ludwig-Georgs-Gymnasium (Darmstadt)
- Heinrich-von-Gagern-Gymnasium (Frankfurt am Main)
- Lessing-Gymnasium (Frankfurt am Main)
- Rabanus-Maurus-Schule / Domgymnasium Fulda (Fulda)
- Friedrichsgymnasium (Kassel)
- Bischof-Neumann-Schule (Königstein im Taunus)
- Tilemannschule (Limburg an der Lahn)
- Gymnasium Philippinum Marburg
- Albertus-Magnus-Schule (Viernheim)
- Diltheyschule (Wiesbaden)

=== Mecklenburg-Western Pomerania ===
- Fridericianum Schwerin
- Gymnasium Carolinum Neustrelitz
- Friedrich-Ludwig-Jahn-Gymnasium Greifswald
- Friderico-Francisceum Gymnasium zu Bad Doberan

=== Lower Saxonia ===
- Gymnasium Ulricianum Aurich
- Wilhelm-Gymnasium (Brunswick)
- Ernestinum Celle
- Ratsgymnasium Goslar
- Max-Planck-Gymnasium (Göttingen)
- Gymnasium Leoninum (Handrup)
- Kaiser-Wilhelm- und Ratsgymnasium Hannover
- Gymnasium Andreanum (Hildesheim)
- Johanneum Lüneburg
- Gymnasium Carolinum Osnabrück
- Ratsgymnasium Osnabrück
- Ratsgymnasium Stadthagen
- Domgymnasium Verden
- Ubbo-Emmius-Gymnasium Leer

=== North Rhine-Westphalia ===
- Ratsgymnasium Bielefeld
- Bischöfliches St.-Josef-Gymnasium Bocholt
- Neues Gymnasium Bochum
- Aloisiuskolleg Bonn
- Beethoven-Gymnasium Bonn
- Schule Schloss Buldern
- Stadtgymnasium Dortmund
- Landfermann-Gymnasium Duisburg
- Görres-Gymnasium (Düsseldorf)
- Humboldt-Gymnasium Düsseldorf
- Städtisches Gymnasium Hennef
- Friedrich-Wilhelm-Gymnasium (Cologne)
- Canisianum (Lüdinghausen)
- Gymnasium Adolfinum Moers
- Schillergymnasium Münster
- Quirinus-Gymnasium Neuss
- Gymnasium Theodorianum Paderborn
- Gymnasium Petrinum Recklinghausen
- Evangelisches Gymnasium Siegen-Weidenau
- Franziskus-Gymnasium Vossenack
- Heilig-Geist-Gymnasium (Würselen)
- Wilhelm-Dörpfeld-Gymnasium Wuppertal

=== Rhineland-Palatinate ===
- Kurfürst-Salentin-Gymnasium (Andernach)
- Gymnasium an der Stadtmauer (Bad Kreuznach)
- Sankt-Josef-Gymnasium (Biesdorf)
- Stefan-George-Gymnasium (Bingen am Rhein)
- Albert-Schweitzer-Gymnasium (Kaiserslautern)
- Eduard-Spranger-Gymnasium (Landau in der Pfalz)
- Theodor-Heuss-Gymnasium (Ludwigshafen)
- Theresianum (Mayence)
- Rabanus-Maurus-Gymnasium (Mayence)
- Privates Gymnasium Marienstatt (bei Hachenburg)
- Kurfürst-Ruprecht-Gymnasium (Neustadt an der Weinstraße)
- Immanuel-Kant-Gymnasium (Pirmasens)
- Regino-Gymnasium (Prüm)
- Gymnasium am Kaiserdom (Speyer)
- Friedrich-Wilhelm-Gymnasium (Trier)
- Rudi-Stephan-Gymnasium (Worms)
- Herzog-Johann-Gymnasium (Simmern)

=== Saarland ===
- Gymnasium am Stadtgarten (Saarlouis)

=== Saxonia-Anhalt ===
- Latina August Hermann Francke (Halle (Saale))
- Giebichenstein-Gymnasium „Thomas Müntzer“
- Landesschule Pforta Bad Kösen (Internat ab 9. Klasse)
- Norbertusgymnasium Magdeburg

=== Saxonia ===
- Evangelisches Kreuzgymnasium Dresden
- Christliches Gymnasium Johanneum Hoyerswerda
- Thomasschule zu Leipzig
- Sächsisches Landesgymnasium Sankt Afra Meißen
- Peter-Breuer-Gymnasium Zwickau

=== Schleswig-Holstein ===
- Domschule Schleswig
- Hermann-Tast-Schule Husumer Gelehrtenschule
- Katharineum zu Lübeck
- Kieler Gelehrtenschule

=== Thuringia ===
- Evangelisches Ratsgymnasium Erfurt

== Italy ==
- Liceo Classico Statale „G. M. Dettori“ Cagliari
- Liceo Classico „Giovanni Pantaleo“ (Castelvetrano)
- Liceo Ginnasio Statale „Alessandro Volta“ (Como)
- Convitto Nazionale „Bernardino Telesio“ (Cosenza)
- Liceo Bagatta (Desenzano del Garda)
- Convitto Nazionale Giordano Bruno (Maddaloni)
- Liceo Classico „Virgilio“ (Mantua)
- Liceo Ginnasio Statale „Alessandro Manzoni“ (Milan)
- Liceo Ginnasio Statale „Giuseppe Parini“ (Milan)
- Liceo Ginnasio Statale „Giovanni Berchet“ (Milan)
- Liceo Ginnasio Statale „Omero – Tito Livio“ (Milan)
- Liceo Ginnasio Statale „Giosue Carducci“ (Milan)
- Liceo Ginnasio Statale „Emanuela Setti Carraro Dalla Chiesa“ (Milan)
- Istituto Leone XIII (Milan)
- Liceo Classico „Cesare Beccaria“ (Milan)
- Istituto S. Ambrogio (Milan)
- L’I.I.S.S. “Gandhi”
- Liceo Classico „Zucchi“ ([[Monza]])
- Liceo Classico „Giuseppe Garibaldi“ (Naples)
- Convitto Nazionale „Vittorio Emanuele II“ (Naples)
- Liceo Classico „Pansini“ (Naples)
- Liceo Classico „Sannazaro“ (Naples)
- Liceo Classico „G. B. Vico“ (Naples)
- Liceo Classico „Umberto I“ (Naples)
- Liceo Classico „A. Genovesi“ (Naples)
- Liceo Classico „Vittorio Emanuele II“ (Naples)
- Liceo Classico „Orazio Flacco“ (Portici)
- Liceo Classico „Carducci“ (Nola)
- Liceo Classico „A. Diaz“ (Ottaviano)
- Liceo Classico „Rosmini“ (Palma Campania)
- Liceo statale „Romagnosi“ (Parma)
- Convitto Nazionale „Maria Luigia“ (Parma)
- Liceo Classico „Melchiorre Gioia“ (Piacenza)
- Convitto Nazionale Statale „Francesco Cicognini“ (Prato)
- Liceo Ginnasio Statale „Cicognini“ (Prato)
- Liceo Ginnasio Statale „Ennio Quirino Visconti“ (Rome)
- Liceo Ginnasio Statale „Dante Alighieri“ (Rome)
- Liceo Ginnasio Statale „Virgilio“ (Rome)
- Liceo Classico Statale „Terenzio Mamiani“ (Rome)
- Liceo Ginnasio Statale „Tacito“ (Rome)
- Liceo Ginnasio Statale „Socrate“ (Rome)
- Liceo Ginnasio Statale „Platone“ (Rome)
- Liceo Ginnasio Statale „Giulio Cesare“ (Rome)
- Liceo Ginnasio Statale „Quinto Orazio Flacco“ (Rome)
- Liceo Ginnasio Statale „Goffredo Mameli“ (Rome)
- Liceo Ginnasio Statale „Lucrezio Caro“ (Rome)
- Liceo Ginnasio Statale „Torquato Tasso“ (Rome)
- Liceo Ginnasio Statale „Pilo Albertelli“ (Rome)
- Liceo Ginnasio Statale „Aristofane“ (Rome)
- Liceo Ginnasio Statale „Immanuel Kant“ (Rome)
- Liceo Ginnasio Statale „Benedetto da Norcia“ (Rome)
- Liceo Ginnasio Statale „Augusto“ (Rome)
- Liceo Ginnasio Statale „Bertrand Russell“ (Rome)
- Liceo Ginnasio Statale „Vivona“ (Rome)
- Liceo Ginnasio Statale „Plauto“ (Rome)
- Liceo Ginnasio Statale „Anco Marzio“ (Rome)
- Liceo Ginnasio Statale „Luciano Manara“ (Rome)
- Liceo Ginnasio Statale „Eugenio Montale“ (Rome)
- Liceo Ginnasio Statale „Seneca“ (Rome)
- Liceo Ginnasio Statale „Convitto Nazionale Vittorio Emanuele II“ (Rome)
- Liceo Ginnasio Statale „Gaetano De Sanctis“ (Rome)
- Liceo Ginnasio Statale „Gaio Lucilio“ (Rome)
- Liceo Ginnasio Statale „Marco Tullio Cicerone“ (Frascati)
- Liceo Ginnasio Statale „Ugo Foscolo“ (Albano Laziale)
- Liceo Ginnasio Statale „Catullo“ (Monterotondo)
- Liceo Ginnasio Statale „Eliano“ (Palestrina)
- Liceo Ginnasio Statale „Michelangiolo Buonarroti“ (Florence)
- Liceo Ginnasio Statale „Dante Alighieri“ (Florence)
- Liceo Ginnasio Statale „Galileo“ (Florence)
- Liceo Ginnasio Statale „Machiavelli“ (Florence)
- Liceo Ginnasio Statale „Galileo Galilei“ (Pisa)
- Liceo classico „Cavour“ (Turin)
- Liceo classico „Massimo D’Azeglio“ (Turin)
- Liceo classico „Alfieri“ (Turin)
- Liceo classico „Vincenzo Gioberti“ (Turin)
- Liceo Ginnasio Statale „A. Doria“ (Genua)
- Liceo Classico e Linguistico Statale „Cristoforo Colombo“ (Genua)
- Liceo Classico “G. Chiabrera” (Savona)
- Liceo Ginnasio Statale „G. Prati“ (Trient)
- Liceo Classico Europeo „Uccellis“ (Udine)
- Liceo Ginnasio Statale „J. Stellini“ (Udine)
- Convitto Nazionale „Paolo Diacono“ (Cividale del Friuli)
- Liceo Ginnasio Statale „Giacomo Leopardi“ (Pordenone)
- Liceo Ginnasio Statale „Dante Alighieri“ (Gorizia)
- Liceo Ginnasio Statale „Primož Trubar“ (Gorizia)
- Liceo Ginnasio Statale „Dante Alighieri“ (Triest)
- Liceo Ginnasio Statale „Francesco Petrarca“ (Triest)
- Liceo Ginnasio Statale Scipione Maffei (Verona)
- Liceo Ginnasio Statale „Marco Polo“ (Venedig)
- Liceo Ginnasio Statale „XXV aprile“ (Portogruaro)
- Liceo Ginnasio Statale „Antonio Canova“ (Treviso)
- Liceo Ginnasio Statale „Andrea Bocchi“ (Adria)
- Franziskanergymnasium Bozen
- Klassisches Gymnasium Vinzentinum (Brixen)
- Klassisches, Sprachen- und Kunstgymnasium „Walther von der Vogelweide“ Bozen
- Sozialwissenschaftliches, Klassisches, Sprachen- und Kunstgymnasium Meran
- Istituto di Istruzione Secondaria di II° Grado „Gen. Antonio Cantore“ Brunico
- Istituto di Istruzione Secondaria di II° Grado „Gandhi“ Merano
- Liceo Classico e Liceo Linguistico „Giosuè Carducci“ Bolzano

== Netherlands ==
=== Flevoland ===
- Baken Trinitas Gymnasium, Almere

=== Provinz Fryslân ===
- Christelijk Gymnasium Beyers Naudé, Leeuwarden
- Stedelijk Gymnasium, Leeuwarden

=== Gelderland ===
- Gymnasium Apeldoorn, Apeldoorn
- Stedelijk Gymnasium, Arnhem
- Stedelijk Gymnasium, Nijmegen

=== Groningen ===
- Praedinius Gymnasium, Groningen
- Willem Lodewijk Gymnasium, Groningen

=== Northern Brabant ===
- Stedelijk Gymnasium, Breda
- St.-Willibrord Gymnasium, Deurne
- Gymnasium Bernrode, Heeswijk
- Stedelijk Gymnasium, ’s-Hertogenbosch
- Sint-Oelbert Gymnasium, Oosterhout
- Gymnasium Beekvliet, Sint-Michielsgestel

=== North Holland ===
- Murmelliusgymnasium, Alkmaar
- Barlaeus Gymnasium, Amsterdam
- Het 4e Gymnasium, Amsterdam
- Het Amsterdams Lyceum
- Vossius Gymnasium, Amsterdam
- St. Ignatiusgymnasium, Amsterdam
- Cygnus Gymnasium, Amsterdam
- Stedelijk Gymnasium, Haarlem
- Gemeentelijk Gymnasium, Hilversum
- Gymnasium Felisenum, Velsen-Süd

=== Overijssel ===
- Gymnasium Celeanum, Zwolle

=== South Holland ===
- Gymnasium Haganum, The Hague
- Christelijk Gymnasium Sorghvliet, The Hague
- Johan de Witt-Gymnasium, Dordrecht
- Gymnasium Camphusianum, Gorinchem
- Coornhert Gymnasium, Gouda
- Stedelijk Gymnasium, Leiden
- Erasmiaans Gymnasium, Rotterdam
- Marnix Gymnasium, Rotterdam
- Stedelijk Gymnasium Schiedam, Schiedam
- Gymnasium Novum, Voorburg

=== Utrecht Province ===
- Johan van Oldenbarnevelt Stedelijk Gymnasium, Amersfoort
- Christelijk Gymnasium Utrecht, Utrecht
- Utrechts Stedelijk Gymnasium, Utrecht

== Serbia ==
- Karlovci Gymnasium (1791)
- Užice Gymnasium (1839)
- Svetozar Marković Gymnasium
- Isidora Sekulić Gymnasium
- Laza Kostić Gymnasium
- Dušan Vasiljev Gymnasium (1858)
- Novi Sad Gymnasium Jovan Jovanović Zmaj

=== Belgrade ===
- First Belgrade Gymnasium (1839)
- Second Belgrade Zemun Gymnasium (1858)
- Third Belgrade Gymnasium (1906)

== Switzerland ==
=== Aargau ===
- Alte Kantonsschule Aarau

=== Basel-Stadt ===
- Gymnasium am Münsterplatz

=== Basel-Landschaft ===
- Gymnasium Liestal

=== Luzern ===
- Kantonsschule Beromünster

=== Obwalden ===
- Stiftsschule Engelberg

=== St. Gallen ===
- Kantonsschule am Burggraben

=== Schaffhausen ===
- Kantonsschule Schaffhausen

=== Schwyz ===
- Stiftsschule Einsiedeln

=== Solothurn ===
- Kantonsschule Solothurn

=== Valais ===
- Lycée-Collège des Creusets

=== Zürich ===
- Freies Gymnasium Zürich
- Kantonsschule Freudenberg
- Kantonsschule Hohe Promenade
- Kantonsschule Limmattal
- Kantonsschule Rychenberg
- Kantonsschule Wiedikon
- Kantonsschule Zürcher Oberland
- Literaturgymnasium Rämibühl

=== United Kingdom ===
- Abingdon School
- Alleyn’s School
- Aylesbury Grammar School
- Bancroft’s School
- Bexley Grammar School
- Birkenhead School
- Bradford Grammar School
- Bristol Grammar School
- Charterhouse School
- Chigwell School
- City of London School
- Clifton College
- Colchester Royal Grammar School
- Dean Close School
- Dollar Academy
- Downside School
- Dulwich College
- Edinburgh Academy
- Eton College
- Fettes College
- Haileybury
- Hampton School
- Harrow School
- Highgate School
- Hutchesons’ Grammar School
- King Edward’s School, Birmingham
- King Edward VI High School for Girls, Birmingham
- King Edward VI School, Southampton
- King’s College School
- King Henry VIII School
- Lancaster Royal Grammar School
- Lancing College
- Leicester Grammar School
- Loughborough Grammar School
- Magdalen College School
- Malvern College
- Manchester Grammar School
- Marlborough College
- Merchant Taylors’ School, Crosby
- Methodist College Belfast
- Millfield School
- Monmouth School
- Oakham School
- Oundle School
- Plymouth College
- Queen Elizabeth’s Grammar School, Blackburn
- Radley College
- Reading School
- Reigate Grammar School
- Repton School
- Robert Gordon’s College
- Royal Grammar School, Guildford
- Royal Grammar School, High Wycombe
- Royal Grammar School, Newcastle
- Rugby School
- Sedbergh School
- Sevenoaks School
- St. Aloysius’ College
- St Paul’s School, London
- Shrewsbury School
- Stonyhurst College
- Stowe School
- The King’s School
- The Maynard School
- The Perse Upper School
- The Tiffin Girls' School
- Tonbridge School
- Warwick School
- Wellington College
- Whitgift School
- Wilson’s School
- Winchester College
- Withington Girls' School, Manchester

== Russia ==
- Gymnasium Classicum Petropolitanum (Санкт-Петербургская классическая гимназия №610), St. Petersburg

== United States ==
=== Colorado ===
- Ridgeview Classical Schools (Fort Collins)

=== Connecticut ===
- Hotchkiss School
- Hopkins School
- Kent School

=== Delaware ===
- St. Andrew’s School

=== Georgia ===
- Holy Spirit Preparatory School (Atlanta)

=== Illinois ===
- Naperville Christian Academy (Naperville)
- New Trier High School (Winnetka (Illinois))

=== Kansas ===
- Cair Paravel Latin School (Topeka)

=== Kentucky ===
- Highlands Latin School (Louisville)

=== Maryland ===
- Georgetown Preparatory School
- Landon School

=== Massachusetts ===
- Belmont Hill School
- Boston University Academy
- Commonwealth School
- Deerfield Academy
- Groton School
- Middlesex School
- Milton Academy
- Noble and Greenough School
- Phillips Academy
- Roxbury Latin School (Boston)
- St. Mark’s School
- Tabor Academy

=== Michigan ===
- North Hills Classical Academy (Grand Rapids)

=== Missouri ===
- John Burroughs School

=== New Hampshire ===
- Phillips Exeter Academy

=== New Jersey ===
- Delbarton School
- Lawrenceville School
- Princeton Day School

=== New York ===
- Collegiate School
- Ethical Culture Fieldston School
- Horace Mann School
- Marymount School of NY
- Ramaz Upper School
- Regis High School
- The Brearley School
- The Montfort Academy
- Trinity School

=== North Carolina ===
- Charlotte Latin School (Charlotte (North Carolina))
- Trinity Academy of Raleigh (Raleigh)

=== Ohio ===
- Western Reserve Academy

=== Pennsylvania ===
- Germantown Friends School
- Haverford School
- Mercersburg Academy
- Saint Joseph’s Preparatory School (Philadelphia)
- Scranton Preparatory School (Scranton (Pennsylvania))
- The Episcopal Academy
- The Hill School

=== Tennessee ===
- McCallie School

=== Texas ===
- The Kinkaid School

=== Virginia ===
- Episcopal High School

=== Washington D. C. ===
- Gonzaga College High School
- National Cathedral School
