= Rijkel Ten Kate =

Dutch classical scholar

- Born: November 22, 1918
- Died: January 16, 2008 (aged 89)

Academic background
- Education: University of Groningen
- Thesis: Quomodo heroes in statii thebaide describantur quaeritur

Academic work
- Discipline: classical Greek
- Institutions: Willem Lodewijk Gymnasium
- Main interests: New Testament apocrypha

Rijkel ten Kate (November 22, 1918 – January 16, 2008) was a Dutch classical Greek scholar, translator and a professor at the Willem Lodewijk Gymnasium in Groningen. Together with C. A. Tukker, he translated the apocryphal writings of the New Testament.

== Life ==
Rijkel ten Kate was born on IJlst.

=== Education ===
Because of the war, Rijkel ten Kate interrupted his studies in Sneek and Leiden. In 1955 Kate earned his PhD with his doctoral thesis Quomodo heroes in statii thebaide describantur quaeritur at the University of Groningen.

=== Teaching ===
After the war, he finished his studies in Groningen, became a teacher of ancient languages in Stadskanaal that same summer. Four years later, he moved to the Willem Lodewijk Gymnasium in Groningen. Rijkel ten Kate had a PhD but worked in secondary education. In the late 1950s, he went to the University of Groningen and taught Latin for six years to students because he wanted to get a modern language teaching certificate, but he did not get it and returned to the Willem Lodewijk Gymnasium. There he would remain for the rest of his working life, the last two years as rector.

== Views ==
Together with C. A. Tukker, he translated the apocryphal writings of the New Testament. He stated: "translate what it says, not what you want it to say". He opposed Liberal Theology, which he considered too far removed from reality.

He questioned the correct translation of three different Greek words (breʹphos, pai·diʹon, and pais) for "child" that appear in Luke 2. In 1993, he wrote critically in Bijbel en Wetenschap, "there was no translation of the Dutch Bible that did justice to the difference between those words", and he said that Luke 2 must be translate bréphos as "newborn child," but paidíon and páis are still lumped together as "child". It could also be questioned that, according to the Dutch Bibles, there was no space for Joseph and Mary in the inn, as Ten Kate said. Ten Kate wrote in 1997, it could also be translated as night residence, tavern, barracks, or stopping place.

== Bibliography ==
=== Thesis ===
- Ten Kate, R. (1955). Quomodo heroes in statii thebaide describantur quaeritur (PhD diss. University of Groningen). OCLC 9872361. OL 11543726W.

=== Books ===
- Ten Kate, R. (1961). Hrotsvits Maria und das Evangelium des Pseudo-Matthäus (in Dutch). OCLC 633281131.
- Ten Kate, R. (1962). Florilegium latinum : bloemlezing van poëzie en proza uit klassiek, christelijk, vulgair en middeleeuws Latijn : (met aantekeningen) (in Dutch). J.B. Wolters, Groningen. OCLC 64977124.
- Ten Kate, R.; Tukker, C. A. (1994). Enige Nieuwtestamentische apokriefe geschriften (in Dutch). De Banier, Utrecht y cop. OCLC 769853719.

=== Articles ===
- Ten Kate, R. (1932). "Kauw en Paddestoel". De Levende Natuur (in Dutch).

== Sources ==
- Kytzler, B. (1958). "Review of Quomodo heroes in Statii Thebaide describantur quaeritur, by R. ten Kate". Gnomon (in Dutch). 30 (3): 234–236. JSTOR 27681784.
- Algemeen Secretariaat voor Katholieke Boekerijen (1970). Lectuur-repertorium. Lectuur-repertorium, Algemeen Secretariaat voor Katholieke Boekerijen / Lectuur-repertorium: bewerkt door A. S. K. B. 1952-66, Supplement bij de Tweede Uitgave, Algemeen Secretariaat voor Katholieke Boekerijen (in Dutch). Vol. 3 (2 ed.). Vlaamsche Boekcentrale.
- The Watchtower Staff (1995). "New World Translation Impresses a Scholar". The Watchtower Announcing Jehovah's Kingdom.
- "Overlijdensadvertentie Overleden: Rijkel ten Kate (16-01-2008)" (in Dutch).
- Hageman, Esther (2008-02-06). "Rijkel ten Kate 1918-2008. Hij promoveerde op een proefschrift in het Latijn". www.trouw.nl (in Dutch).
- "Quomodo heroes in statii thebaide describantur quaeritur". University of Groningen (in Dutch).
