= CGU =

CGU may refer to:

- Canadian Geophysical Union, a Canadian learned society
- CGU plc, a British insurance company
- CGU Insurance, an Australian insurance company
- Chang Gung University in Taiwan
- Christelijk Gymnasium Utrecht
- Claremont Graduate University in California in the United States
- Compostela Group of Universities, a European university network
- Office of the Inspector General (Brazil), abbreviated CGU in Portuguese
- a codon for the amino acid arginine
- a cash generating unit, an IFRS accounting term
