= Bibel TV =

German Christian television channel

- Country: Germany
- Broadcast area: Europe
- Headquarters: Hamburg, Germany

Programming
- Picture format: 1080i HDTV (downscaled to 576i for the SDTV feed)

History
- Launched: 1 October 2002; 23 years ago

Links
- Website: bibeltv.de

Availability

Terrestrial
- DVB-T2 (Germany): Various; region dependent (HD / FTA)

Streaming media
- bibeltv.de: Watch live

Bibel TV is a German Christian TV channel. The station is on air on 1 October 2002 with a 24 hour program of Christian services and magazines. The station is rued by an ecomenic conglomerat of Christian organisations.

== Owner ==
Bibel TV is owned and operated by a charitable non-profit foundation (Stiftung) based in Hamburg, Germany. Today, the station says it finances itself primarily from donations from its viewers.

A group of 16 shareholders decide on the distribution of the funds. A good half of the shares are owned by the Norman Rentrop Foundation, named after the founder. The Protestant and Catholic churches each hold 12.75 percent through their own media companies. Smaller shareholders are the television arm of the association of Evangelical Free churches (including Baptist, Methodist, Mennonite, Pentecostal, Salvation Army), the German Billy Graham Association, Campus Crusade for Christ in Germany and the German Bible Society (Deutsche Bibelgesellschaft).

The director of Bibel TV is Matthias Brender, following the retirement in February 2013 of the founding director, Henning Röhl.

== History ==
According to their own history, Bible TV goes back to Bonn publisher Norman Rentrop. He claims to have found a Bible in a hotel room in Baden-Baden in 1990, which inspired him so much that he read it every day in the future. While watching a Hollywood film adaptation of the Gospel of Luke, he finally came up with the idea of founding a TV station that would spread the biblical message.

In 2001 he launched the Bible TV channel and provided almost seven million euros in start-up funding. The channel went on air on October 1, 2002 under the direction of former MDR program director Henning Röhl.

== Program ==
Bible TV's content is predominantly in the conservative Christian spectrum. In addition to talk shows, documentaries and church services, the program consists of Christian films and series, most of them third-party productions.

== Critics ==
Critics complain that Bibel TV conveys a backwards image of women and families.

In 2020, the church union filed a criminal complaint against the Bible TV managing director for preventing a works council election. Two employees who had campaigned for the establishment of a works council had previously been dismissed. Lawsuits filed by the two affected employees against their dismissals ended in settlements.

== Distribution ==
Bibel TV is distributed via digital satellite (Astra satellites), most digital cable providers in Germany, Austria and Switzerland, a number of analogue cable systems and on terrestrial DVB-T2 throughout Germany as well as on the web by continuous streaming on Bibel TV's website.
