= Norman Rentrop =

Norman Rentrop (born 1957 in Bonn) is a German publisher, author and investor.

A self-confessed admirer of Warren Buffett and longstanding shareholder of Berkshire Hathaway, he is owner/shareholder of the German - based "Rentrop publishing group", "Rentrop & Straton" in Romania, "Wiedza i Praktyka" in Poland. His charitable foundation holds 51% of the charitable Bibel TV foundation. Since 2002 he supported the satellite television channel Bibel TV with 6.9 million Euro. In 2004 he sold his minority shares in news channel n-tv to CNN.

Norman Rentrop is the first of five children of Friedhelm Rentrop, CPA. In 1975 he founded Rentrop publishing. He made his A-Levels at the Jesuit boarding school Aloisiuskolleg in Bonn. Having been an exchange student to England he got his business idea: publishing a business magazine called Die Geschäftsidee which still is one of the flagship publications of his publishing company, which focuses on publishing newsletters and looseleaf services.

In 2000 he moved from his position as chief executive officer to the non-executive position as chairman of the supervisory board of his publishing company and started the charitable Rentrop foundation.

Rentrop is main sponsor of BG Rentrop Bonn 92 e.V. a women's professional basketball team in the German WNBA. His private investment office includes the "Dr. Elsässer Beteiligungsgesellschaft Nr II mbH" which in 2003 bought a major stockholding in one of the top German soccer teams, Borussia Dortmund from Deutsche Bank. The stake was sold in 2004.
