= Alfred Delp =

German Jesuit resistance fighter (1907–1945)

Servant of God Alfred Delp SJ
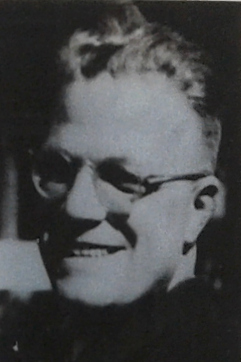
- Alfred Delp
- Born: 15 September 1907; Mannheim, German Empire
- Died: 2 February 1945 (aged 37); Plötzensee Prison, Berlin

Alfred Friedrich Delp (German: [ˈalfʁeːt ˈdɛlp]; 15 September 1907, Mannheim – 2 February 1945, Plötzensee Prison) was a German Jesuit religious priest and philosopher of the German Resistance. A member of the inner Kreisau Circle resistance group, he is considered a significant figure in Catholic resistance to Nazism. Falsely implicated in the failed 1944 July Plot to overthrow Adolf Hitler, Delp was arrested and sentenced to death. He was executed in 1945.

== Early life and education ==
Alfred Delp was born in Mannheim, Grand Duchy of Baden, to a Catholic mother Maria, née Bernauer and a Protestant father Johann Adam Friedrich Delp. Although he was baptised as a Catholic, he attended a Protestant elementary school and was confirmed in the Lutheran church in 1921. This was due to the influence of his paternal grandmother. Following a bitter argument with the Lutheran pastor, he requested and received the sacraments of First Communion and Confirmation in the Catholic Church. His Catholic pastor recognized the boy's intelligence and love for learning and arranged for him to study at the Goetheschule in Dieburg. Possibly because of the dual upbringing, he became later an ardent proponent of radically better relations between the Churches.

Thereafter, Delp's youth was moulded mainly by the Bund Neudeutschland Catholic youth movement. Immediately after passing his Abitur – in which he was top of his class – he joined the Society of Jesus in 1926. Following philosophy studies at Pullach, he worked for 3 years as a prefect and sports teacher at Stella Matutina Kolleg in Feldkirch, Austria, where in 1933, he first experienced the Nazi regime, which forced an exodus of virtually all German students from Austria and thus the Stella Matutina by means of a punitive 1000 Mark fine to be paid by anyone entering Austria. With his Director, Fr Otto Faller and Professor Alois Grimm, he was among the first to arrive in the Black Forest, where the Jesuits opened Kolleg St. Blasien for some 300 students forced out of Austria. After St. Blasien, he completed his theology studies in Valkenburg, The Netherlands (1934–1936), and in Frankfurt (1936–1937).

== Ministry ==
In 1935, Delp published his Tragic Existence, propagating a God-based humanism and reviewing the existentialism of Martin Heidegger. In 1937, Delp was ordained a Catholic priest in Munich. Delp had wanted to study for a doctorate in philosophy at the Ludwig-Maximilians-Universität München, but he was refused admission to the university for political reasons. From 1939 on, he worked on the editorial staff of the Jesuit journal Stimmen der Zeit ("Voices of the Times"), until the Nazis suppressed it in April 1941. He was then assigned as rector of St. Georg Church, part of Heilig-Blut Parish in the Munich neighbourhood Bogenhausen. He preached both at Heilig-Blut and St. Georg, and also secretly helped Jews who were escaping to Switzerland through the underground.

== Resistance ==
Outspoken opposition to the Nazis by individual Jesuits resulted in harsh response from government officials, including imprisonment of priests in concentration camps. The government takeover of church property, "Klostersturm", resulted in the loss of valuable properties such as that of Stimmen der Zeit, and limited the work of the Jesuits in Germany. The Jesuit provincial, Augustin Rösch, Delp's superior in Munich, became active in the underground resistance to Hitler.

Rösch introduced Delp to the Kreisau Circle. As of 1942, Delp met regularly with the clandestine group around Helmuth James Graf von Moltke to develop a model for a new social order after the Third Reich came to an end. Delp's role was to explain Catholic social teaching to the group, and to arrange contacts between Moltke and Catholic leaders, including Archbishop Konrad von Preysing of Berlin and Bishop Johannes Dietz of Fulda.

== Arrest and trial ==
After the 20 July plot to assassinate Hitler failed, a special Gestapo commission arrested and interrogated all known members of the Resistance. Delp was arrested in Munich on 28 July 1944 (eight days after Claus von Stauffenberg's attempt on Hitler's life), although he was not directly involved in the plot. He was transferred to Tegel Prison in Berlin. While in prison, he secretly began to say Mass and wrote letters, reflections on Advent, on Christmas, and other spiritual subjects, which were smuggled out of the prison before his trial. On 8 December 1944, Delp had a visit from Franz von Tattenbach SJ, sent by Rösch to receive his final vows to the Jesuit order. This was supposedly forbidden, but the attending policemen did not understand what was going on. Delp wrote on the same day, “It was too much, what a fulfillment, I prayed for it so much, I gave my life away. My chains are now without any meaning, because God found me worthy of the 'Vincula amoris' (chains of love)”.

He was tried, together with Helmuth James Graf von Moltke, Franz Sperr, and Eugen Gerstenmaier, before the People's Court (Volksgerichtshof) on 9–11 January 1945, with Roland Freisler presiding. Delp, von Moltke, and Sperr were sentenced to death by hanging for high treason and treason. The court had dropped the charge against Delp of being aware of the 20 July plot, but his dedication to the Kreisau Circle, his work as a Jesuit priest, and his Christian-social worldview were enough to seal his fate.

== Execution ==
While he was in prison, the Gestapo offered Delp his freedom in return for leaving the Jesuits, but he rejected it. Delp, like all prisoners connected with 20 July, was required to wear handcuffs day and night. Prisoners being taken to execution were handcuffed with their hands behind their backs. The sentence was carried out on 2 February 1945 at Plötzensee Prison in Berlin, at the same time as Carl Friedrich Goerdeler and Johannes Popitz. The next day, Roland Freisler was killed in an air-raid. A special order by Heinrich Himmler required that the remains of all prisoners executed in connection with 20 July Plot be cremated, and their ashes scattered over the sewage fields. Accordingly, the body of Alfred Delp was cremated and his ashes disposed of in an unknown location near Berlin.

== Posthumous honours ==
In September 1949, the superior Otto Faller at Kolleg St. Blasien unveiled memorial plaques for Delp and Alois Grimm, both former educators and teachers slain by the Nationalsocialists. Thirty years later, Kolleg St. Blasien named its new theatre hall after Delp. The Alfred Delp Memorial Chapel in Lampertheim was consecrated on 2 February 1965, on the 20th anniversary of his death. Many schools in Germany are named after Alfred Delp, among them one in Bremerhaven. In Mannheim and in Göttingen, Catholic student residences are named for him. The guesthouse on the campus of Canisius College in Berlin also bears his name. In Dieburg, the uppermost level at the Gymnasium, the Alfred Delp School, the Catholic community centre, the Father Delp House, and a street are named after him. The Bundeswehr named its barracks in Donauwörth the Alfred-Delp-Kaserne. In 1955, the Wasserburgerstrasse, a street in Munich-Bogenhausen where Eva Braun resided beginning in 1935, has been renamed Delpstrasse.

Delp's name was included among the almost other 900 Catholics in a list of people having suffered a violent death for adherence to the Christian faith, published in 1999 as Zeugen für Christus. Das deutsche Martyrologium des 20. Jahrhunderts (Witnesses for Christ. The German Martyrology of the 20th century), prepared by Mgr Helmut Moll under the auspices of the German Bishops' Conference.

== Beatification process ==
Delp's final parish in Munich sent documentation supporting a beatification process to the Archbishop of Berlin, Cardinal Georg Sterzinsky, in January 1990. The Archdiocese of Munich and Freising announced in January 2026 that the beatification process would be opened on 2 February.

== Writings ==
Delp's book In the Face of Death, published in 1956, gathered together his meditations, notes, fragments of his diary and letters, written during his six months imprisonment, and has been compared to Dietrich Bonhoeffer's Letters and Papers from Prison. It is the first part of a trilogy that includes Committed to the Earth and The Mighty God. The American edition of his Prison Meditations (1963) had an introduction by Thomas Merton, who considered him a mystic and among the most insightful writers of his time. The German edition of his Collected Works (1982–1988) was edited by Fr. Roman Bleistein SJ in five volumes.

Delp is best known for his writings that were smuggled out of prison. Because he was imprisoned during the Christmas season, many of these are on the theme of Advent and the coming of Jesus. In one of his last letters, Delp wrote, "...all of life is Advent". Many Christians continue to read and be inspired by Delp's life and witness.

== Quotes ==
- God does not need great pathos or great works. He needs greatness of hearts. He cannot calculate with zeroes
- It is the time of sowing, not of harvesting. God is sowing; one day He will harvest again. I will try to do one thing. I will try to at least be a healthy and fruitful seed, falling into the soil. And into the Lord God's hand.
- Whoever does not have the courage to make history, becomes its poor object. Let's do it!
- Many of the things that are happening today would never have happened if we had been living in that longing, that disquiet of heart which comes when we are faced with God, and when we look clearly at things as they really are. If we had done this, God would have withheld his hand from many of the things that now shake and crush our lives. We would have come to terms with and judged the limits of our own competence.
- When we get out of here, we will show, that (ecumenicism) is more than personal friendship. We will continue to carry the historical burden of our separated churches, as baggage and inheritance. But never again shall it became shameful to Christ. Like you, I do not believe in the utopia of complete unity stews. But the one Christ is undivided, and when undivided love leads to Him, we will do better than our fighting predecessors and contemporaries.
- If there was a little more light and truth in the world through one human being, his life has had meaning.
- In half an hour, I'll know more than you do.
- We need people who are moved by the horrific calamities and emerge from them with the knowledge that those who look to the Lord will be preserved by Him, even if they are hounded from the earth.
- Someday, others shall be able to live better and happier lives because we died.

== Works ==
- Tragische Existenz. Zur Philosophie Martin Heideggers, Herder, Freiburg im Breisgau, 1935.
- Gesammelte Schriften (German edition of his Collected Writings, edited by Roman Bleistein SJ) in five volumes:
1. Geistliche Schriften (1982)
2. Philosophische Schriften (1983)
3. Predigten und Ansprachen. (1983)
4. Aus dem Gefängnis. (1984)
5. Briefe – Texte – Rezensionen (1988)

== See also ==
- Jesuits and Nazi Germany

== Sources ==
=== Sources in English ===
- Coady, Mary Frances, With Bound Hands: A Jesuit in Nazi Germany, Loyola Press, Chicago, 2003, ISBN 0-8294-1794-X.
- Alfred Delp, Advent of the Heart: Seasonal Sermons and Prison Writings 1941-1944, Ignatius Press, San Francisco, 2006, ISBN 1-58617-081-3. Biographical information pp. 13–19 and pp. 173–189.
- Anton Gill, An Honourable Defeat, Henry Holt, New York, 1994.
- Kreuser Interview, personal memories of Father Delp as pastor in Munich
- Biography at GDW-Berlin, the center for remembrance of the German Resistance
- Delp honored by Raoul Wallenberg Foundation (regarding Alfred Delp's assistance to Jews)

=== Sources in German ===
- Roman Bleistein, Alfred Delp, Geschichte eines Zeugen (Alfred Delp, A Witness's Story), Knecht Verlag, Frankfurt am Main 1989, ISBN 3-7820-0598-8
- Günther Saltin, Durchkreutztes Leben, Schlüssler, Mannheim 2004 (2), ISBN 3-00-012687-2
- Elke Endraß, Gemeinsam gegen Hitler. Pater Alfred Delp und Helmuth James Graf von Moltke, Kreuz Verlag, Stuttgart 2007, ISBN 978-3-7831-2881-9
- Rita Haub/ Heinrich Schreiber, Alfred Delp, Held gegen Hitler (Alfred Delp, Hero Against Hitler), Echter Verlag, Würzburg 2005, ISBN 3-429-02665-2
- Christian Feldmann, Alfred Delp. Leben gegen den Strom (Alfred Delp, Life Against the Current), Herder, Freiburg 2005, ISBN 3-451-28569-X
- Glaube als Widerstandskraft. Edith Stein, Alfred Delp, Dietrich Bonhoeffer (Faith as Strength to Resist: Edith Stein, Alfred Delp, Dietrich Bonhoeffer), 1987, ISBN 3-7820-0523-6
