= Dušan Vasiljev =

Serbian writer (1900–1924)

- Душан Васиљев
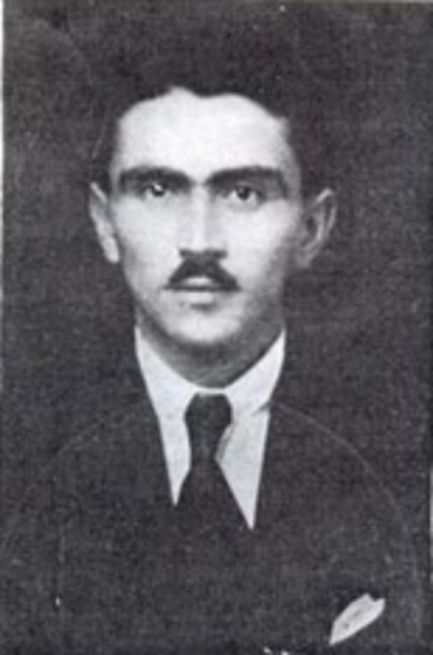
- Born: July 19, 1900; Velika Kikinda, Austria-Hungary (now Serbia)
- Died: March 27, 1924 (aged 23); Velika Kikinda, Kingdom of Serbs, Croats and Slovenes
- Occupations: poet, playwright
- Writing career
- Genre: poetry
- Literary movement: expressionism

Dušan Vasiljev (Serbian Cyrillic: Душан Васиљев; 19 July 1900 – 27 March 1924) was a Serbian-Yugoslavian poet, novelist and playwright. He was one of the most significant expressionists in Serbian literature.

== Life ==
Vasiljev was born on 19 July 1900 in Velika Kikinda in the Banat region, then part of the Austro-Hungarian Empire, now part of Serbia. His mother, Rakila, was from Perlez in and his father's name was Kosta. Dušan had two sisters, Aleksandra and Jelena, and a brother, Spasoje. His mother died in 1904 and his father remarried. This marriage produced another five children, three of which died at childbirth.

Dušan attended primary school in his hometown of Kikinda, and secondary school in Temišvar, where his family moved in 1911.

The outbreak of World War I saw his father mobilised to the front, leaving Dušan to care for his siblings. He attended Teachers' College and worked as a clerk at the same time, and in 1917 he too joined the army. He was mobilised in 1918 and sent to the front at Piave (river), along the battlefront between Austria-Hungary and Italy. He returned home exhausted and suffering from symptoms of malaria and bronchitis. On his return to Temišvar he continued working for the Serbian army as a clerk and interpreter.

He founded the literary group "Kolo mladih Srba" ("The Circle of Young Serbs") and the journal "Sloga" ("Unity"). When the Serbian army left Temišvar, Dušan moved to Belgrade. He enrolled into the University of Belgrade Faculty of Philosophy and began contributing to various literary journals including "Sloga" and "Dan" ("Day"). Before he had to abandon his studies he completed a course in pedagogy and, in 1920, moved to Cenei to work as a teacher until 1923. In the same year he married Milijka Maletić.

He was called again to the army in 1921 to Kratovo, but was sent home the same year on grounds of poor health. He spent his time in Cenei reading and writing, but his condition worsened. He went to Zagreb to attempt treatment, but was advised to return the following spring.

He died on 27 March 1924 in Kikinda, his birthplace.

== Poetry ==
Dušan Vasiljev's dark and paradoxical view of the world and his particular understanding of the human condition were influenced by many factors. These include his tragic experience of World War I and its aftermath; Kikinda and Temišvar, the towns where he grew up and was educated; and his social background, to name a few.

World War I pushed many contemporary artists to adopt extremist viewpoints. The apocalyptic and dramatic visions, the denial of reality, the loss of trust towards one's fellow man, in his historical responsibility, scepticism towards knowledge, towards the expansion of technology and industry, towards modern forms of society, the pursuit of new worlds and new values, all contributed to an ambivalent and complex new situation.

As a poet, Vasiljev came to prominence with his poem Čovek peva posle rata ("A Man Sings After the War"), published in the journal Misao ("Thought") in 1920 to critical acclaim. This work expressed the spiritual mood of the young people who, returning from a catastrophic war, had to reconcile their terrible experience with the need to integrate back into the mundane everyday life. Pessimism is characteristic of the lyrics of Vasiljev, also known as "the poet of revolt."

During his lifetime Dušan Vasiljev did not manage to publish a book of his poetry. He wrote around 300 poems, about 20 novels, and four plays. The two preserved plays by Dušan Vasiljev are characterized by the opening of poet's intimate world and moulding of his experience into the dramatic form. In his plays Vasiljev deals with problems of marriage, married bliss, fidelity and infidelity. The majority of his oeuvre can be found in the National Library of Serbia in Belgrade.

== Works ==
=== Poetry ===
- Selected poems (selection by Živko Milicević. Preface by Velimir Živojinović), Serbian Literary Association, Belgrade, 1932, p.. XIV + 94
- Poems (edited by Živan Milisavac), Matica Srpska, Novi Sad, 1950, p.. 386th
- A man sings after the war (selection and edited by Stevan Raičković. Preface, "Dusan Vasiljev, a Man" by Radomir Konstantinović), Prosveta, Belgrade, 1968, p.. (10) 92.
- Selected poems (selection and preface, "Complexity of Dušan Vasiljev's Poetry" by Ljubomir Simović), Rad, Beograd, 1975, p.. (13) 98.
- A man sings after the war (selection and preface, "The Bitter Memories of Slaughter" by Jovan Delić), Veselin Masleša, Sarajevo, 1982, p.. (43) 271.
- Poems (selection and postscript by John Zivlak), Kairos, Sremski Karlovci, 2000, p. 130 (133-191)

=== Prose ===
- On the Doorstep, short stories and plays (introduction and edited by dr. Aleksandar Pejović), Rad, Beograd, 1986, p.. (20) 325.

== See also ==
- Dušan Vasiljev Gymnasium, Kikinda
