= Sankt-Ansgar-Schule =

Secondary school in Hamburg, Germany

Location
- Bürgerweide 33; 20535 Hamburg; Germany
- Coordinates: 53°33′27.61″N 10°1′54.44″E

Information
- Type: Independent school
- Religious affiliations: Jesuit, Catholic
- Patron saint: Saint Ansgar
- Established: 1946
- Principal: Hans-Martin Flesch
- Faculty: 73 (2019)
- Grades: 5–13 (Abitur)
- Gender: Coeducational
- Enrollment: 914 (2020)
- Website: www.sankt-ansgar-schule.de
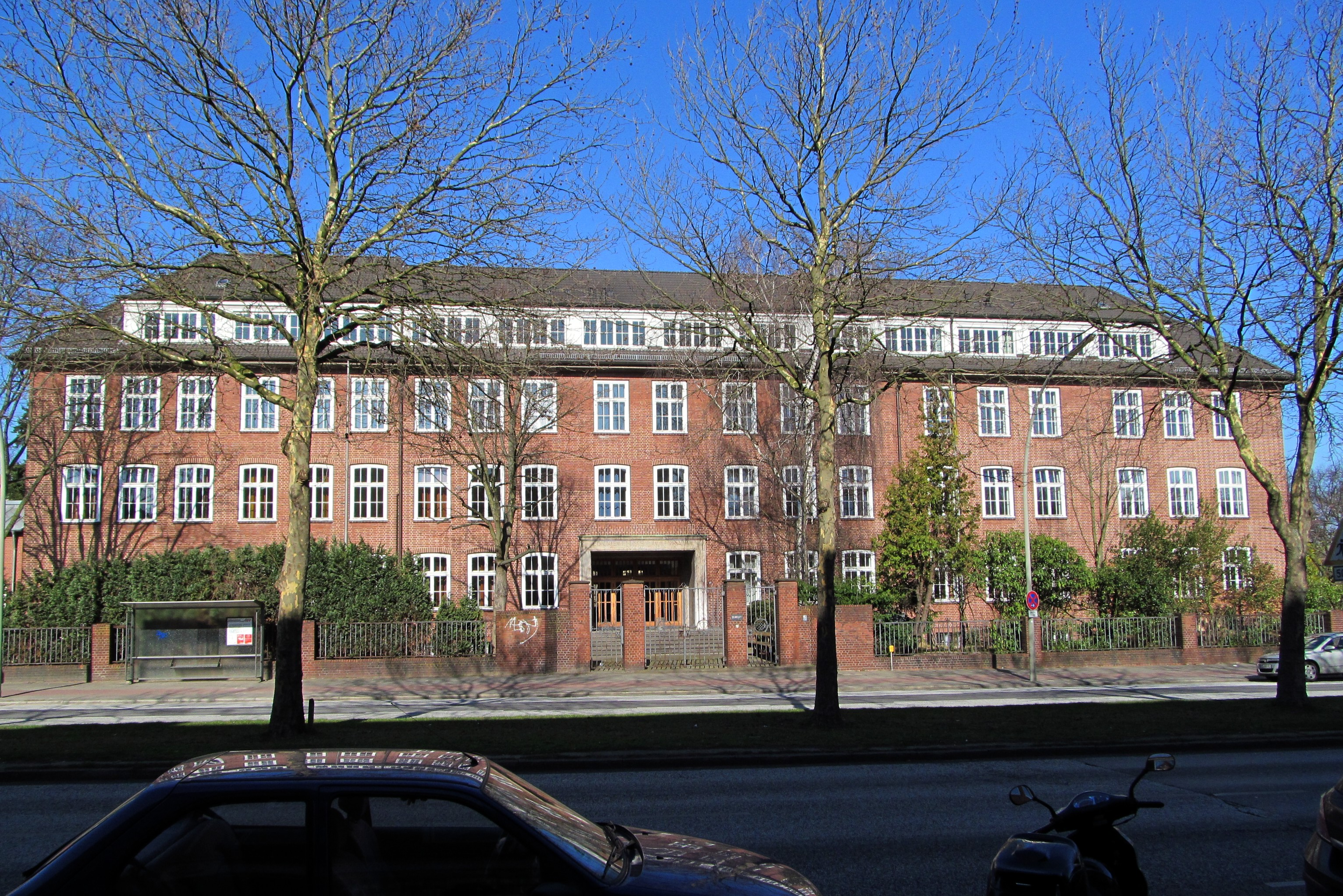

The Sankt-Ansgar-Schule (common abbreviation: SAS) is a private secondary school in Hamburg, Germany. It was founded in 1946 as the only boys' school by the Society of Jesus, an order of the Catholic Church, in the State of Hamburg. The school was named after Saint Ansgar who Christianized Northern Germany in the 9th century. The motto of the SAS is: bonitatem et disciplinam et scientiam doce me, domine which is engraved above the official main entrance. In 1978, it became a co-educational school. The Jesuits gave up running the school in 1993 themselves but the Sankt-Ansgar-Schule has remained a member of the association of Jesuit schools and still follows all of the order's rules for their educational institutions. Currently, the archbishopric of Hamburg formerly runs the school.

== History ==
In 1917, the first plans were made to found a Jesuit school in Hamburg. For many reasons like World War I, the following hyperinflation in the Weimar Republic, and the period of Nazi Germany, they could not be implemented. Right after World War II, the Catholic church started to negotiate with the British occupation authorities as well as the Senate as the city civil government again. The plans for a new secondary school were approved and the SAS was founded on 4 May 1946. Today, the Sankt-Ansgar-Schule is regarded as an example for a typical German Gymnasium by the National Library of Germany.

== Education ==
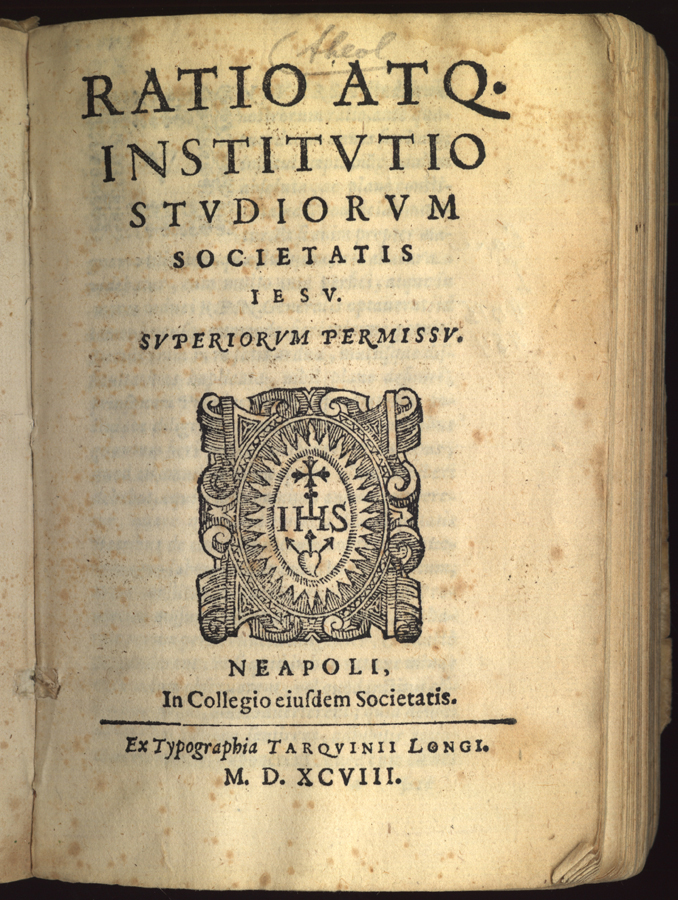
The Ratio Studiorum, dated 1598, formally issued in 1599

The Leitmotif at the SAS is based on the educational concepts according to Ignatius of Loyola (1491-1556), founder of the Society of Jesus. His Ratio Studiorum of 1598 sets the theoretical basis of Ignatian pedagogy up to modern times. The publication emphasizes three pillars: altruism, justice, and self-reflection on one's own deeds.

The SAS follows all rules and regulations made by the state for all public schools in Hamburg. Therefore, despite the fact that, for example, Catholic religion is an obligatory subject, evolution is taught in biology and not creationism.

== Location and Buildings ==
The school lies in the Hamburg district of Borgfelde, near the city center and the Alster lake. The premises of the SAS at the Bürgerweide street used to be home for an elementary school which was destroyed during the Operation Gomorrah, a massive bombing in 1943 by the RAF Bomber Command.

The building which is today known as the Altbau (literally: the old building) was erected in 1952/1953, based on plans of the architect Gerhard Kamps. Since 1968, it is listed in the official register (Denkmalliste) of the cultural heritage management of the state of Hamburg. In 1970–1971, an extension building alongside the adjacent Alfredstraße was built and opened. In 2010, it was expanded with six new classrooms and an elevator.

The facility is close to a Penny market which is popular among students. Mostly during the big break and lunchtime but also if a class is cancelled, students walk to the store and grab something to drink or to eat.

== Notable alumni ==
- Ansgar Beckermann
- Brun-Otto Bryde
- Milka Loff Fernandes
- Godehard Giese
- Klaus Grawe
- Iveta Mukuchyan
- Alexander-Martin Sardina
- Christoph de Vries
- Michael Weikath

== See also ==
- Aloisiuskolleg, Bonn
- Canisius-Kolleg Berlin
- Kolleg St. Blasien
- List of Jesuit sites

== Publications by the school ==
- Sankt-Ansgar-Schule (Ed.): Bericht Sankt-Ansgar-Schule. Hamburg, 1955.
- Sankt-Ansgar-Schule, Pater Hans Hartmann SJ: Sankt-Ansgar-Schule Hamburg. 1960–1964. Hamburg, 1964.
- Sankt-Ansgar-Schule (Ed.): Sankt-Ansgar-Schule Hamburg. 1946–1971. Hamburg, 1971.
- Sankt-Ansgar-Schule, Christoph Disselhoff (Ed.): 40 Jahre Sankt-Ansgar-Schule. 1946–1986. Hamburg, 1986.
- Sankt-Ansgar-Schule, Andreas Oettel, Helge Sturm (Ed.): 50 Jahre Sankt-Ansgar-Schule. 1946–1996. Publication with a CD-ROM (19 pieces of the SAS Band). Hamburg, 1996.
- Sankt-Ansgar-Schule (Ed.): So beten wir! Gebete von Jugendlichen der 10. Klassen der Sankt-Ansgar-Schule in Hamburg. Hamburg, 1999.
- Sankt-Ansgar-Schule, Richard Lutz (Ed.): Borgfelde – Damals und heute. 1880–2012. Bildband zum Schülerprojekt zum 70. Jahrestag der Zerstörung des Stadtteils und der Einweihung des Schulgebäudes vor 60 Jahren. Hamburg, 2013.
