= Nikolaus Brender =

German journalist

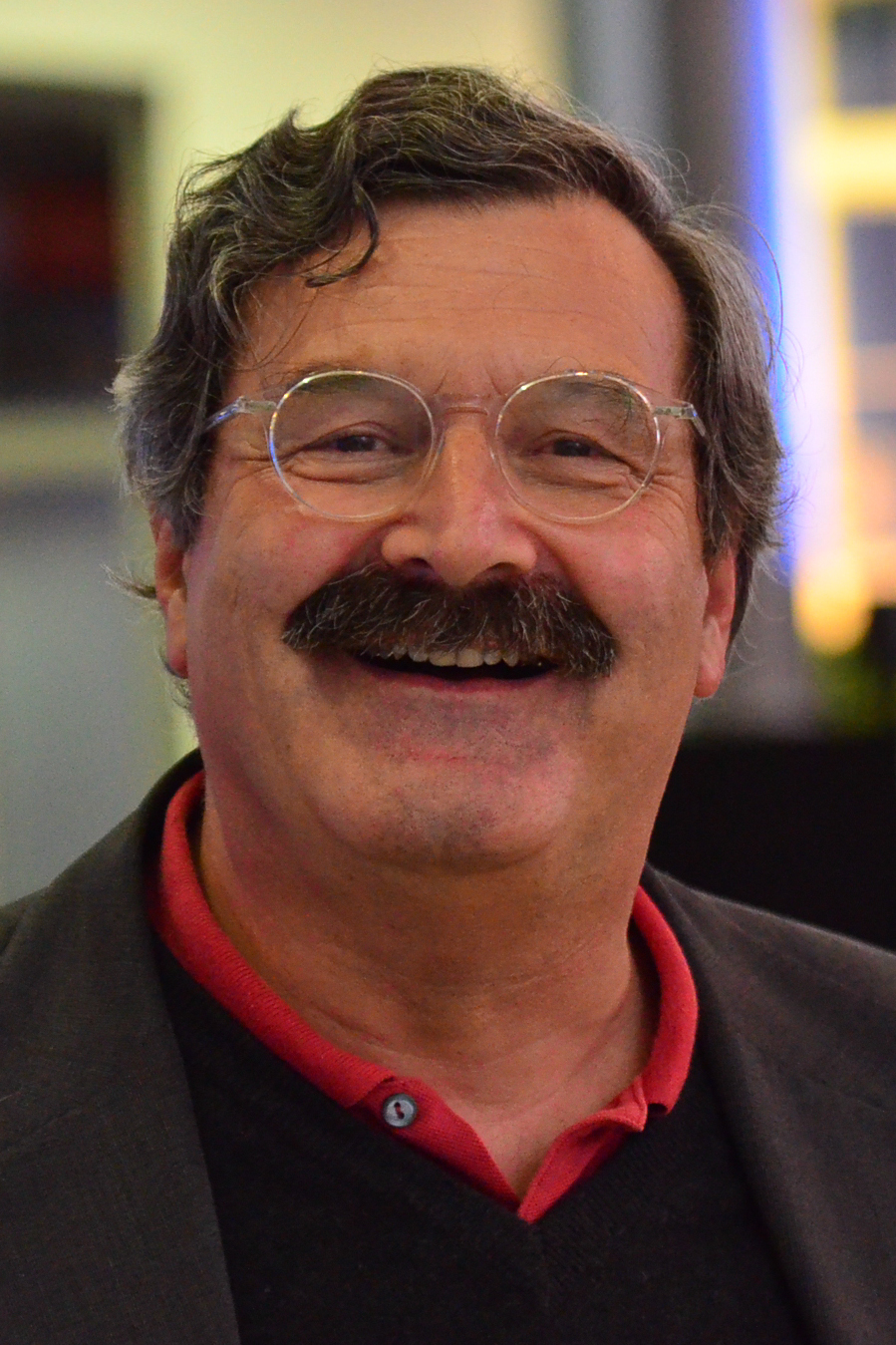
- Born: 24 January 1949 (age 77); Freiburg im Breisgau, Germany
- Occupation: Commissiong editor ZDF
- Spouse: Carola Brender

Nikolaus Brender (born 24 January 1949) is a German journalist. He was the commissiong editor of the German public broadcasting station ZDF between 2000 and 2010.

== Life ==
Brender was born in Freiburg im Breisgau, then French zone of occupation, today Baden-Württemberg. After schooling at a Jesuit school in St. Blasien in the southern Black Forest (Kolleg St. Blasien), he studied jurisprudence and political science at the University of Freiburg, LMU Munich, and the University of Hamburg, obtaining a Staatsexamen degree in 1978.

In his youth, he was a member of the Christian Democrat youth organisation, the Junge Union; today, however, he is not affiliated with any party.

Brender has been working as a journalist since 1978, initially for the Zeit, a weekly newspaper from Hamburg (1978–80) and the Südwestrundfunk, the regional TV station of southwestern Germany (Baden-Württemberg and Rhineland-Palatinate) (1978–82). From 1984 to 1989, he worked for the public broadcasting station ARD as a correspondent in Buenos Aires. Following that, he was the head of the foreign correspondents department of the regional TV station for North Rhine Westphalia, the WDR, until 1993. Brender was then head of the department of political coverage at WDR until 1997, before being programme director of that same station. Since 1 April 2000, he has been commissiong editor of ZDF.

== Controversy ==
Controversially, he had to quit this post in March 2010 after the extension of his contract with ZDF was denied by a majority of the station's administrative board members that are politically affiliated with the German Conservative party (the Christian Democratic Union (CDU)).

He was succeeded by Peter Frey.

In 2014, the constitutional court found the charter unconstitutional, and gave a deadline of 30 June 2015 for the ZDF.

== Family ==
Brender is married to Carola Brender, they have a daughter.

== Awards ==
- Adolf Grimme Award 1988
- Bayerischer Fernsehpreis 1990
- Hanns Joachim Friedrichs Award for Journalism 2009
- Journalist of the Year 2009 by Medium magazine
