= Alois Grimm =

German priest executed because his resistance to the Nazi régime (1886–1944)

Alois Grimm

Alois Grimm (24 October 1886 in Külsheim, Germany – hanged 11 September 1944 in Brandenburg-Görden) was a Jesuit priest, patristic scholar, educator, and victim of Nazi religious hostility.

== Early years ==
After graduation from Gymnasium (German high school), the young Grimm could not decide as to whether he should follow a navy career or become a priest. Together with his father he made a retreat with Jesuits in the Netherlands, since the order had been outlawed in Germany since the Kulturkampf (1870). In the fall of 1907, he entered the Society of Jesus. His philosophical and theological studies were interrupted by World War I, which he spent as a nurse in military hospitals. 1920 he was ordained priest and was assigned to the German Speaking Catholic Mission in Florence, Italy. From 1922 until 1926 he studied the classical languages, Latin and Greek, and history in Vienna and Heidelberg. From 1926 on he taught at the Jesuit Gymnasium, Kolleg Stella Matutina in Feldkirch Austria and after 1934 at the Kolleg St. Blasien in Germany.

== Theological research ==
As patristic scholar, Grimm worked on a critical edition of the Ambrosiaster for the Corpus Scriptorum Ecclesiasticorum Latinorum (CSEL) in Vienna, Austria. The Ambrosiaster is a Latin commentary on Saint Paul, dating back to the fourth century. It exists in many manuscripts and was believed to have been written by Ambrose of Milan. Grimm's research was aimed at making a critical edition of the Ambrosiaster, which would determine the original version as well as provide an accurate account of the development of variant texts.

== Confrontation with National Socialism ==
The rise of Nazism in Germany caused complications for the Jesuits at Sankt-Blasien, many of whom were openly opposed to the Nazi Party, its ideology, and its political program. Father Grimm was among those who became increasingly vocal in his opposition to Nazism while at Sankt Blasien, and he attracted the negative attention first of more sympathetic colleagues and then of the authorities. A layman who was teaching at Kolleg St. Blasien and a member of the NSDAP remarked, "Grimm talked in derogatory ways about our new ideology. I hope we will shut him up, for a long time, or better even, forever". Grimm was aware of this hostile attention and had some sense of its implications: It would be my greatest honour and luck, if something happens to me. Nazi hostility to the Catholic Church, and the Jesuit order in particular, led the government to expel the Jesuits from Sankt-Blasien in 1939. Father Grimm returned to Tisis, Austria, where he taught Latin in a nearby Catholic seminary and assisted in the local parish. In 1943, an SS soldier came to Grimm and asked to be admitted to the Catholic Church. Father Grimm provided the soldier with religious instruction and eventually received the soldier's wife and child into the Church as well. All these actions were illegal under German law at the time. The soldier also introduced Grimm to an acquaintance who likewise expressed interest in entering the Church. In October 1943, the Gestapo arrested Father Grimm from the parish rectory and transported him for interrogation to the Gestapo prison in Innsbruck. Father Grimm had been arrested on the basis of a denunciation by the S.S. soldier's acquaintance, who was a Gestapo agent.

== Execution by hanging ==
After several weeks of interrogation and mistreatment in Innsbruck, Fr. Grimm was transferred to Berlin, where he underwent further torture and interrogation. In the summer of 1944, Father Grimm was put on trial before the so-called Volksgerichtshof, which had jurisdiction over ideological offenses against the Third Reich. Both Fr. Grimm's "converts" testified against him. Fr. Grimm suggested he had been entrapped. The notoriously hysterical chief justice of the Volksgerichtshof, Roland Freisler screamed in response, as was his wont, "Fishes are caught in different ways. I have to be very careful to catch a trout. If I want to catch a Jesuit, I have to use special methods. You swallowed it. That proved us right." His public defender, Joachim Lingenberg, wrote afterwards: "Father Grimm's defense belongs to the most frightful memories of my life. It has to do with a piece of historical truth that we must hold onto especially in a time that cheapens the memory of such events.". On 12 August 1944, Roland Freisler stripped Father Grimm of all civil rights and privileges damnatio memoriae and sentenced him to death for two counts of undermining the fighting spirit of the German Wehrmacht and for defeatism. Reflecting on his sentence, Grimm wrote: "The hour has come, I am going home into eternity. In a few hours, I will stand in front of my Judge, my Redeemer and my Father. It is God's will, to be done everywhere. Don't mourn over me, I am returning home, you have to wait. I give my life for the kingdom of God, which knows no end, for the society of Jesus, for the youth and religion of our home land". Father Alois Grimm was hanged at the age of 57 on 11 September 1944 in the Brandenburg-Görden Prison.

== Honours ==
Five years after the execution, Grimm's ashes were given a resting place at the Kolleg St. Blasien by its Superior, Otto Faller: "Dear friend, this will be our vow on your silent grave, to live for the kingdom of God, which knows no end, for the Society of Jesus, for the youth and religion of our home land. Farewell, dear friend. From now on, be custodian of this house and its ever renewing youth, protect us with your spirit and pray for us, so we may keep our promises, always".

With these words, Kolleg St. Blasien was dedicated to Alois Grimm in 1949. Afterwards, other schools, buildings, streets were named after Father Alois Grimm. Today, in his hometown Kuelsheim, there is a Father Alois Grimm school. In the Jesuit Church in Innsbruck and in Pullach near Munich, Father Grimm is honored with memorial plaques. Last year, a new building in St. Blasien was named after him. Benedicta Kempner, the wife of US attorney Robert Kempner, war crime tribunals in Nuremberg set Alois Grimm a memorial in her book on the persecution of Catholic priests during the Nazi era.

== Quotes of Father Grimm ==
- We live in a time, in which the Church of God is under attack like never before. Not compassion or pity, honour is being demanded today. But if the orders of this world are contrary to the orders of Christ, then the orders of the World are obviously wrong. Every human authority, yes, the authority of a whole people too, has to step back, before the authority of Christ.
- The suffering increases, the cross is getting heavier, as all seem to know. But Christ carrying his cross is our model, our consolation, even our joy. In front of us eternity full of light and the full victory of Christ, who will reign in truth forever. (1936)
- We live in a difficult time. Our responsibility before God and before the coming centuries will be enormous. Our prayer, work and sacrifice must contribute, so that the present and future belong to Christ. This is a large and beautiful calling, which should fill us with joy, despite all the sufferings. This is not the time for petty jealousies or self-pity. Everything is at stake. (1937)

== Bibliography ==
- Benedicta Maria Kempner: Priester vor Hitlers Tribunalen. München 1967
- Günther Schüly: Pater Alois Grimm. Kolleg Brief Weihnachten 1956, Kolleg St. Blasien 1956, PP. 35 – 48
