= Aloisiuskolleg =

Coordinates: 50°40′39″N 7°09′02″E

Location
- Elisabethstraße 18, D-53177; Bonn, North Rhine-Westphalia; Germany

Information
- Type: Jesuit (Catholic)
- Established: 1900; 126 years ago
- Founder: Jesuits
- Status: State & Archdiocese supported
- Chairman: P. Martin Löwenstein SJ
- Headmaster: Walter Odekerken
- Gender: coeducational
- Enrollment: 730
- Yearbook: AKO-Heft
- Website: www.aloisiuskolleg.de
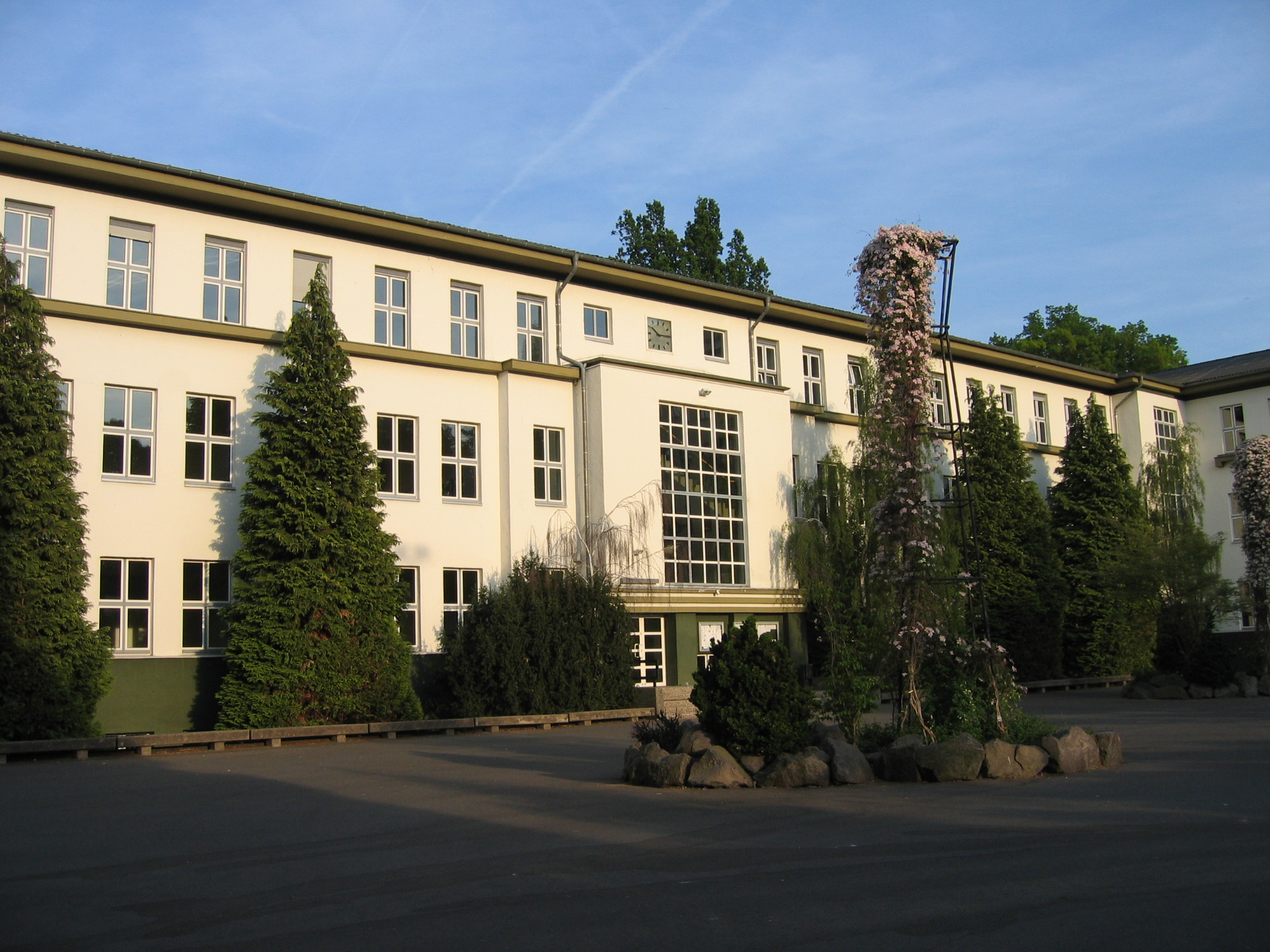

The Aloisiuskolleg is a co-educational, Jesuit (Catholic), University-preparatory school in Bonn-Bad Godesberg, Germany, which includes boarders. It is named for Saint Aloysius Gonzaga. Highly ranked academically, it is considered one of the most prestigious boarding schools in Germany. Since early 2010 the school has been investigated for cases of child abuse.

== Organization ==
Since 1921 the Jesuits have operated a boarding school for boys in Bonn Bad-Godesberg. Ninety-four percent of its budget is provided by German North Rhine-Westphalia, even though the college is non-governmental, run by the Jesuits. The remaining 6% is covered by the Archdiocese of Cologne. The school is open to everyone. The State conducts the school-leaving examination (called the Abitur, the equivalent of A-levels in the UK) and proposes the subjects of instruction. In turn, the school is recognized by the State, and a successfully completed Abitur by any graduate allows admission to a German university. Lodging, food, and boarding run about €14,000 per year, while students from impoverished families are sponsored by the Jesuits or by the charge for other boarders.

== School competitions ==
The Aloisiuskolleg (AKO) ranks high each year at regional, national, and even international school competitions in sports, as well as in subjects like physics, chemistry, biology, mathematics, music, art, and computer sciences, and has won several awards. A PISA study ranked the school 4th in Germany and among the best in Europe. Also in other OECD studies the school is usually ranked highly.

== International co-operation ==
The College attaches importance to international contacts, and has promoted cultural exchange with other countries since its founding. Since 1997 this has included the European Union's COMENIUS program which promotes co-operation among European schools. Partnerships exist with Clongowes Wood College (Ireland), Eton College and Maidenhead (both in England), and Georgetown Prep in Washington, D.C., United States.

== History ==
=== Establishment ===
As a consequence of the Kulturkampf, the State of Prussia took over by law the supervision of all Jesuit schools in 1872. On 12 August 1900 the German province of the Society of Jesus opened the Aloisiuskolleg in Sittard, Netherlands, as an all-boys school with boarding facilities. This started with German nationals, 43 internal and 38 external pupils on 29 September 1900 with a pre-class and 5th and 6th grades. This was the beginning of the Aloisiuskolleg.

=== Move to Bonn Bad-Godesberg; Nazi period ===
The law against Jesuits ("Jesuitengesetz") was repealed in 1917 and new schools opened again in Germany. The Aloisiuskolleg moved to Bonn in 1921. In 1927 the Jesuits also acquired a nearby villa owned by the banker August Karl Baron von der Heydt, son of August von der Heydt, and turned it into "Stella Rheni", a boys' home.

During the Nazi period, the school and the Jesuits opposed the regime and the school was closed in 1938. The active resistance by the Jesuits and the pupils plays an important role in the contemporary self-understanding of the College. Well-known resistors to the Nazis were Georg Freiherr von Boeselager and his brother Philipp. The Jesuits reopened the Aloisiuskolleg in 1946, after the end of World War II.

=== Abuse of pupils ===
From early 2010 the school was at the centre of investigations into the abuse of pupils, resulting in the resignation of Chairman Theo Schneider who was accused of complicity. The progress report by the commission investigating cases of abuse counted 45 victims and 18 perpetrators, 15 of whom were members of the Jesuit order, since the 1950s. The interim report highlighted the "latent psychological violence" in the punishment methods, the compulsive exhibitionism, and crossing the line with paedo-erotic acts of the late chairman, P. Ludger Stüper, S.J. who apparently approved of photographing child nudity, even when they were uncomfortable with it. A 2011 report concludes that "only in one case can a co-operation of religious, provincial, and school leaders be recognized to cover up sexual abuse... at the beginning of the sixties."

== Co-education ==
In the 1980s, the Aloisiuskolleg along with nearby Clara Fey High School became co-educational in the upper classes: all students had their choice of either school. After 2002 the Aloisiuskolleg accepted girls in the lower classes, then in 2005 a separate boarding facility was built for girls.

== Facilities, buildings, and plant ==
=== School ===
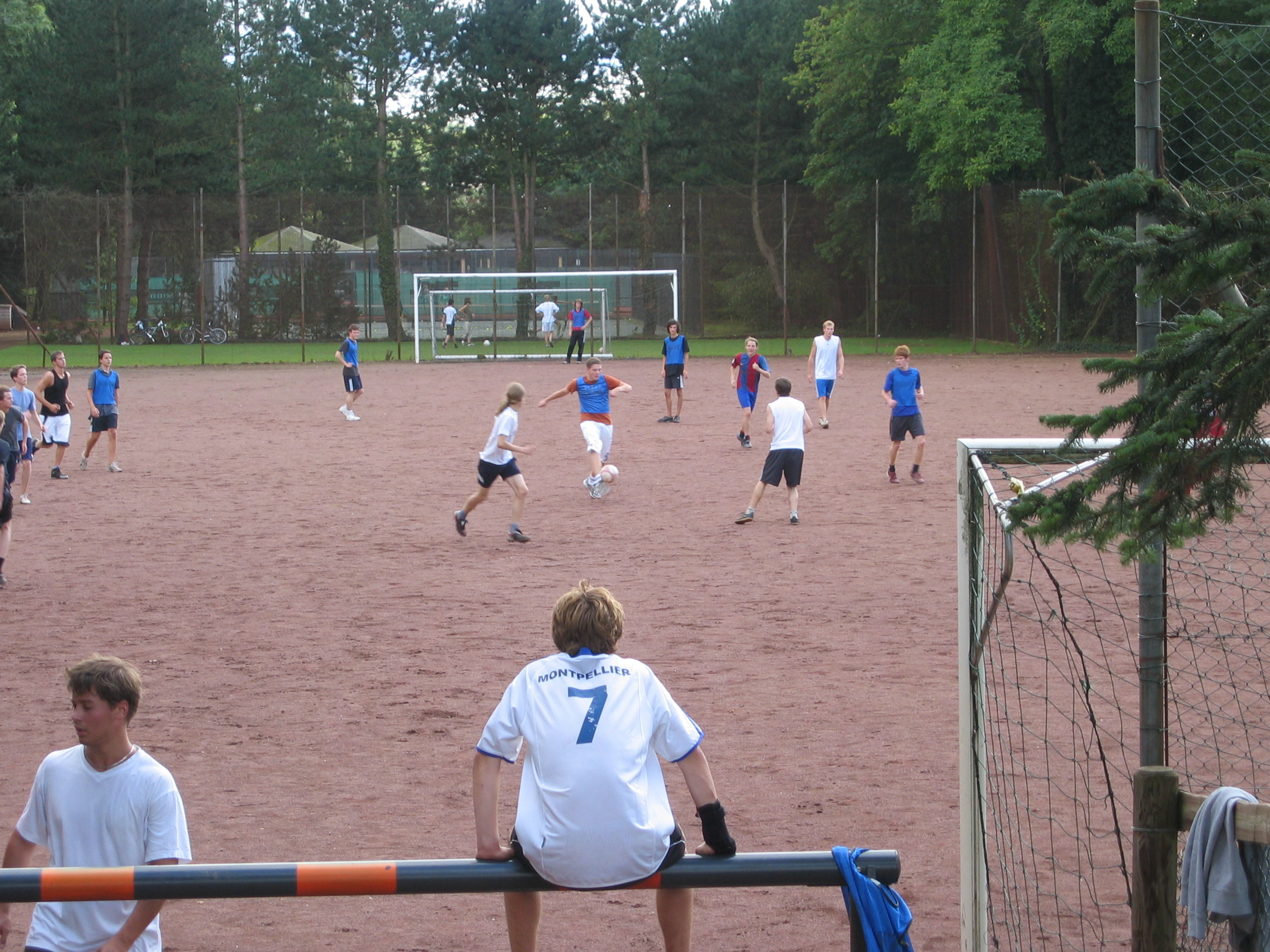

The school is a U-shaped, three-storey building from the 1920s. In addition to classrooms it houses two rooms each for chemistry, physics, computers, and music along with a language laboratory and a library. Workmen's equipment is located under the gyms and includes welding devices, a joinery, and printing presses.

Between the school building and the newer boarding houses is the "Fathers Tower", a five-storey square tower in which the fathers lived since improvements in the 1970s. Prior to this, boarding schools with the youngest pupils were accommodated on the two upper floors, which gave the building the nickname "boys silo".

=== Sports facilities ===
The sports facilities include two gymnasiums next to the school building. In front of the gyms is a basketball court. The school yard also contains a basketball and handball court. Beyond the school yard on the way to Stella there is a football field, a tartan track, five tennis courts, and a half-court (wall-court).

=== Stella Rheni ===
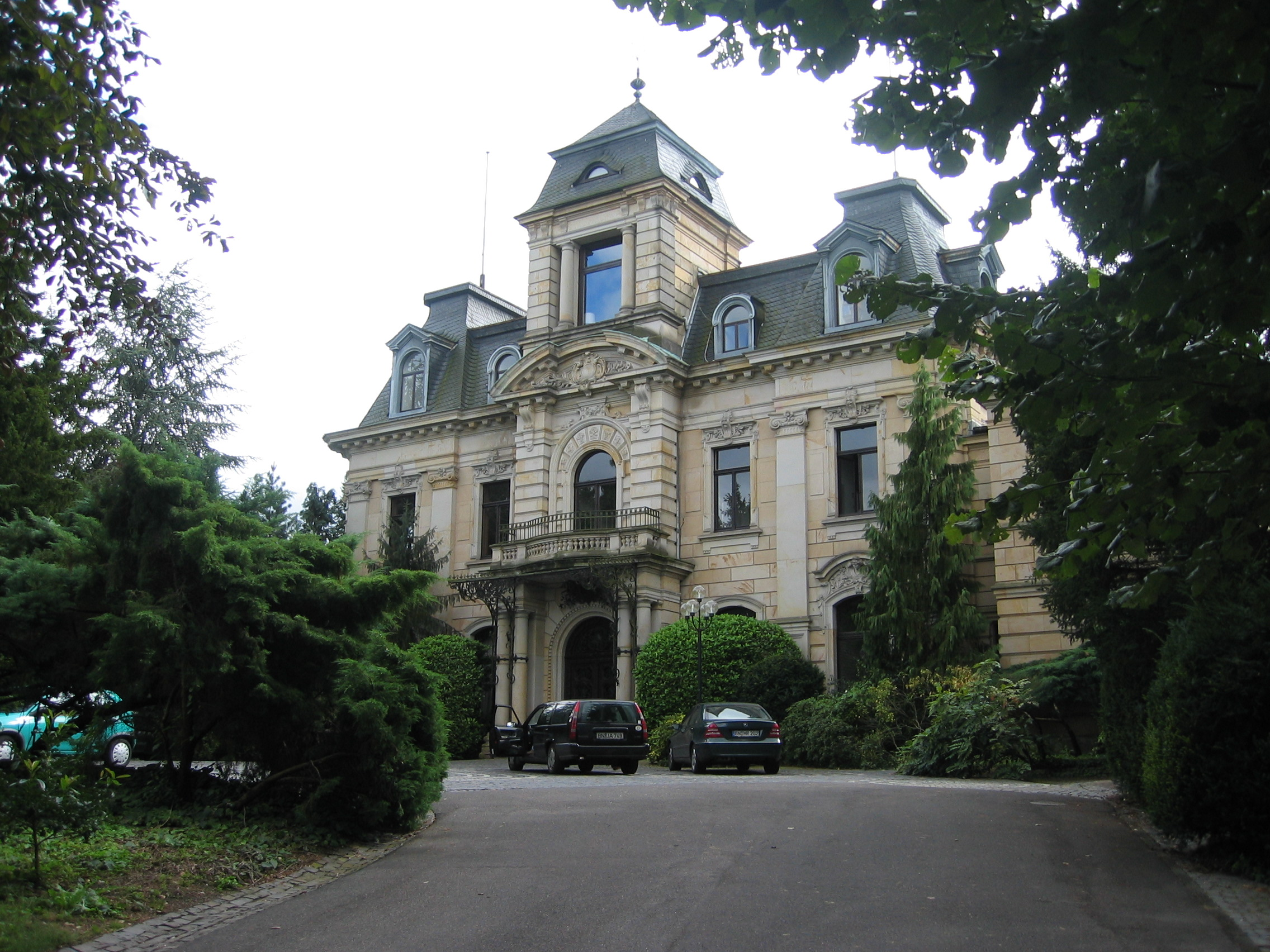

In 1891-1893 the Elberfeld banker Baron Karl von der Heydt commissioned the "Castle on the Juniper" by the architect Heinrich Plange in neoclassical architecture and gave it the name "Stella Rheni" (Latin for "Star of the Rhine"). From this strictly geometrical building in yellow sandstone, you can enjoy a view over the Rhine valley and Siebengebirge. Walter von Engelhardt who also landscaped Charlottenburg laid out the extensive park. Since 1927, the Jesuit Villa has been used as a boarding school for young and middle-class boys.

=== Jägerhaus ===
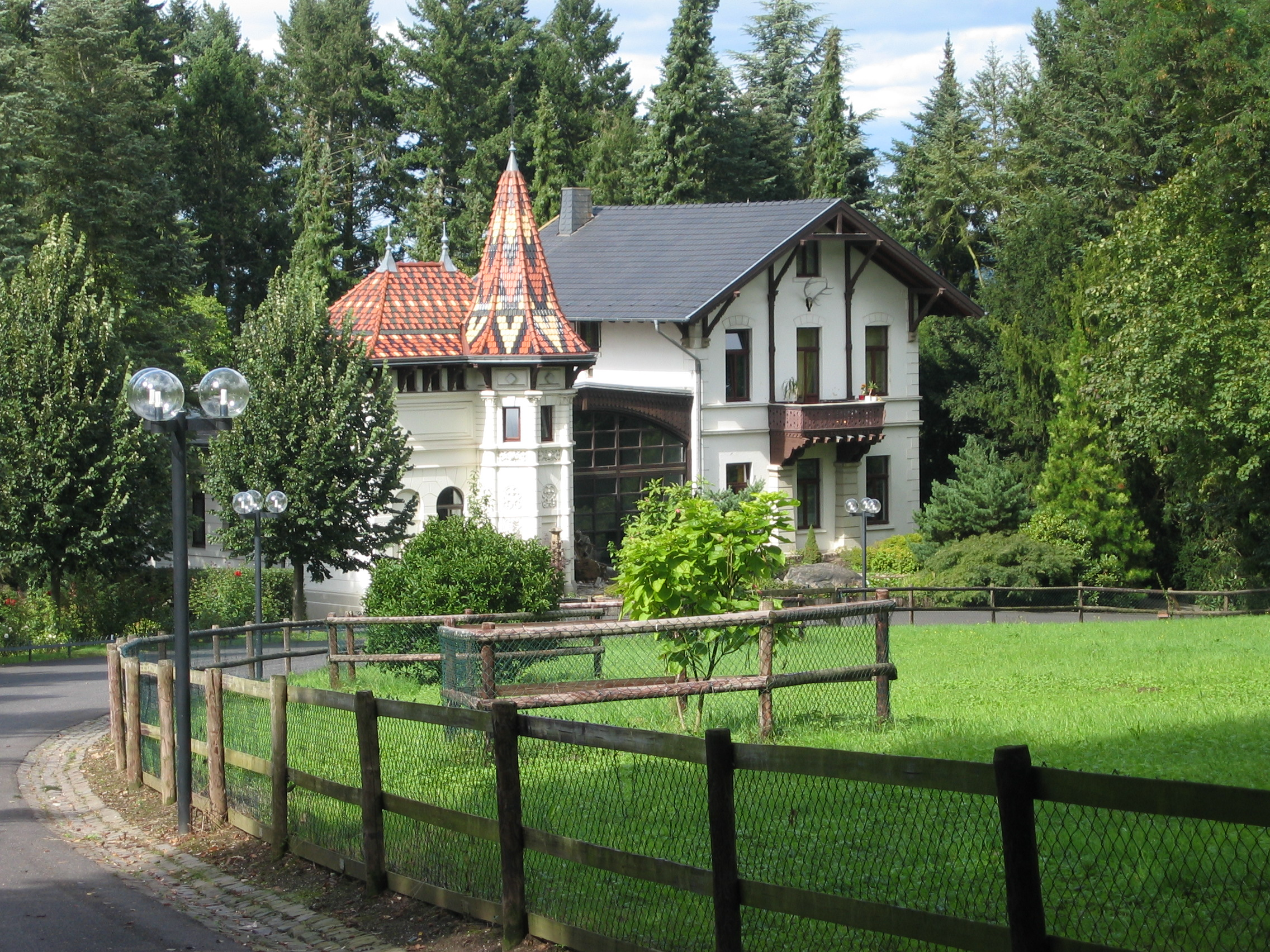

The "Jägerhaus", formerly belonging to the Heydts, is a highly romantic miniature version of a hunting castle and lies about 200 meters below the Stella. Here the primary students used to live on their own, without supervision.

=== New ===
The new building was built together with the school building in the 1960s and was connected to the Fathers' Tower. It was L-shaped and was renovated in 2006. In the renovation a part of it was demolished and replaced by a newly built rotunda: the classic L-shape was not retained. From the new building there is direct access to the rotunda.

=== Girls' house ===
The girls' house was finished in September 2005 after a year of construction on the former fruit orchards opposite the school, by the office of architects Pilhatsch & Partner. The girls' house opened in the summer of 2006, since in the transitional period the building was used for the boys who were boarding, who had to leave the old "new building" temporarily because of renovation work.

=== Church ===
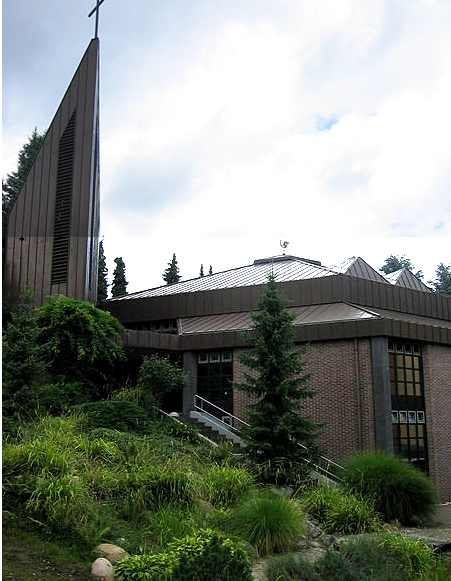

An octagonal church was built in the early 1980s, on the site of a dilapidated church from the 1960s. The showpiece of the church is a bronze sculpture of an angel by Ewald Mataré.

== Alumni ==
Former pupils of the school can remain connected through the alumni network. Former pupils of the Aloisiuskolleg, Kolleg St. Blasien, and the Canisius-Kolleg Berlin College can find addresses at Stellaner webpage. For alumni of the Aloisiuskolleg there is a special association, found at Aloisiuskolleg Alumni.

=== Notable alumni of the Aloisiuskolleg ===
- Georg Freiherr von Boeselager - resistance fighter from 20 July 1944
- Philipp Freiherr von Boeselager - resistance fighter from 20 July 1944
- Philipp Brenninkmeyer - actor, member of Brenninkmeijer family
- Till Brönner - musician
- Hanns Feigen – lawyer
- Johannes B. Kerner – television host (ZDF)
- Alexander Graf Lambsdorff - executive committee of the FDP and member of the European Parliament
- Stefan Raab - German television host (TV Total)
- Norman Rentrop – publisher and investor
- Hans Riegel - entrepreneur, founder of Haribo
- Thomas de Maizière - former Federal Minister of the Interior and Head of the German Chancellery, cousin of Lothar de Maizière

== See also ==
- Canisius-Kolleg Berlin
- Kolleg St. Blasien
- Sankt-Ansgar-Schule
- List of Jesuit sites
