= Kolleg St. Blasien =

Coordinates: 47°45′36″N 8°07′48″E

Location
- Fürstabt-Gerbert-Straße 14; Sankt Blasien, Baden-Württemberg, 79837; Germany

Information
- Type: Gymnasium; Day and boarding school
- Religious affiliation: Roman Catholic
- Established: 1307
- Director: Fr Klaus Mertes SJ
- Oberstudiendirektor (Headmaster): Michael Becker
- Grades: 5–12
- Gender: Coeducational
- Website: www.kolleg-st-blasien.de

The Kolleg St. Blasien is a state-recognised private Gymnasium (university preparatory school) and Catholic school with boarding facilities for boys and girls. It is situated in the town of St. Blasien in the German Black Forest. The school has 850 students, 300 of whom are boarders, and is led by members of the Jesuit order (Society of Jesus). It is considered to be one of the most prestigious schools in Germany with a rich and long history.

== Today's school ==
The Kolleg consists of the twin structures of the school (Schule) and boarding element (Internat) which are led by the overall director of the Kolleg (Kollegsdirektor), Pater Hans-Martin Rieder, S.J. Students from over 20 countries come to the Kolleg, primarily to learn German in the Euroklasse. At the end of a year of intensive tuition in German language and culture, students are awarded the Zertifikat Deutsch or "Zentrale Mittelstufenprüfung" awarded by the Goethe Institute. The Kolleg is also renowned for its teaching of Chinese and classical languages. All students study for the German Abitur and the school is a Gymnasium (grammar school) recognised by the state of Baden-Wuerttemberg. In addition there is a varied program of extra-curricular activities ranging from rugby to drama.

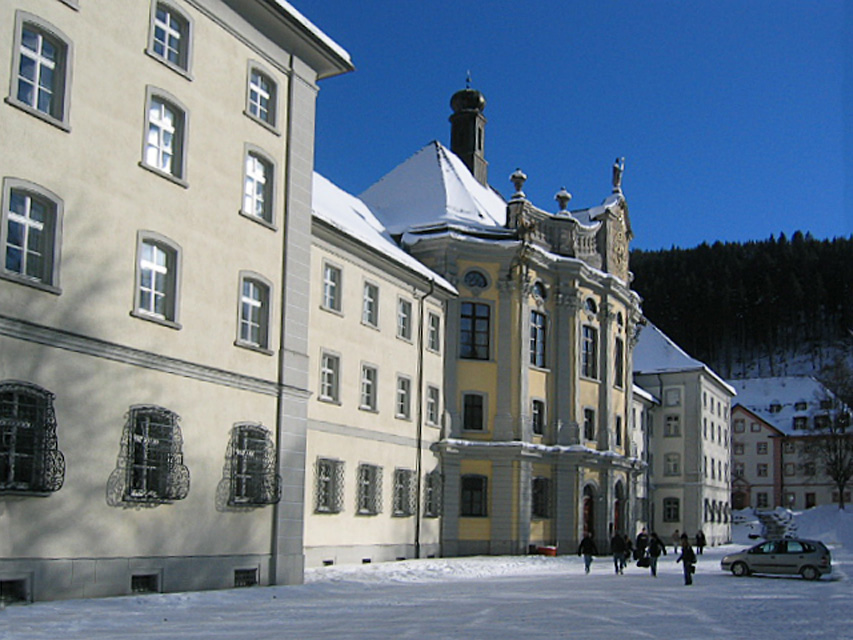

== History ==
The history of the school dates back to 1596, when Jesuits started a school in Freiburg, Switzerland. This school moved to Feldkirch, Austria, in 1856 and to St. Blasien, Germany, in 1934. The National Socialists closed the school in 1939, in order to open an Adolf-Hitler school there. After World War II, the Jesuit order re-opened the school in 1946, which in war-torn Germany was only possible in light of significant material aid from Pope Pius XII.

=== Sexual abuse scandal ===
In 2010, Padre Wolfgang S. admitted to several acts of sexual abuse of minors during his years as a teacher in Sankt Blasius from 1982 to 1984. Rev. Stefan Dartmann stated that Wolfgang had also committed acts of sex abuse in Spain and Chile.

== Notable people ==
=== Alumni ===
- Nikolaus Brender, journalist
- Gabriel Dessauer, organist and conductor, Chor von St. Bonifatius
- Alfred Schickel, revisionist historian
- Ferdinand von Schirach, writer and lawyer

=== Former teachers ===
- Alfred Delp, Jesuit priest and member of the German resistance to Nazism, who was hanged by the Nazis in Berlin on 2 February 1945.
- Otto Faller, Jesuit educator
- Alois Grimm, Jesuit priest who was executed by the Nazis

== See also ==
- Aloisiuskolleg
- Canisius-Kolleg Berlin
- Sankt-Ansgar-Schule
- List of Jesuit sites
