= Canisius-Kolleg Berlin =

Independent school in Berlin, Germany

Coordinates: 52°30′33″N 13°21′16″E

- 30/31 Tiergartenstraße; Berlin Germany

Information
- Type: Independent school
- Religious affiliation: Roman Catholic (Jesuit)
- Patron saint: St. Peter Canisius, SJ
- Established: 1925
- President: Marco Mohr, SJ
- Principal: Dr. Jan Bernhardt
- Grades: 5–13 (Abitur)
- Gender: Coeducational
- Enrollment: 840 (2011)
- Website: canisius-kolleg.de
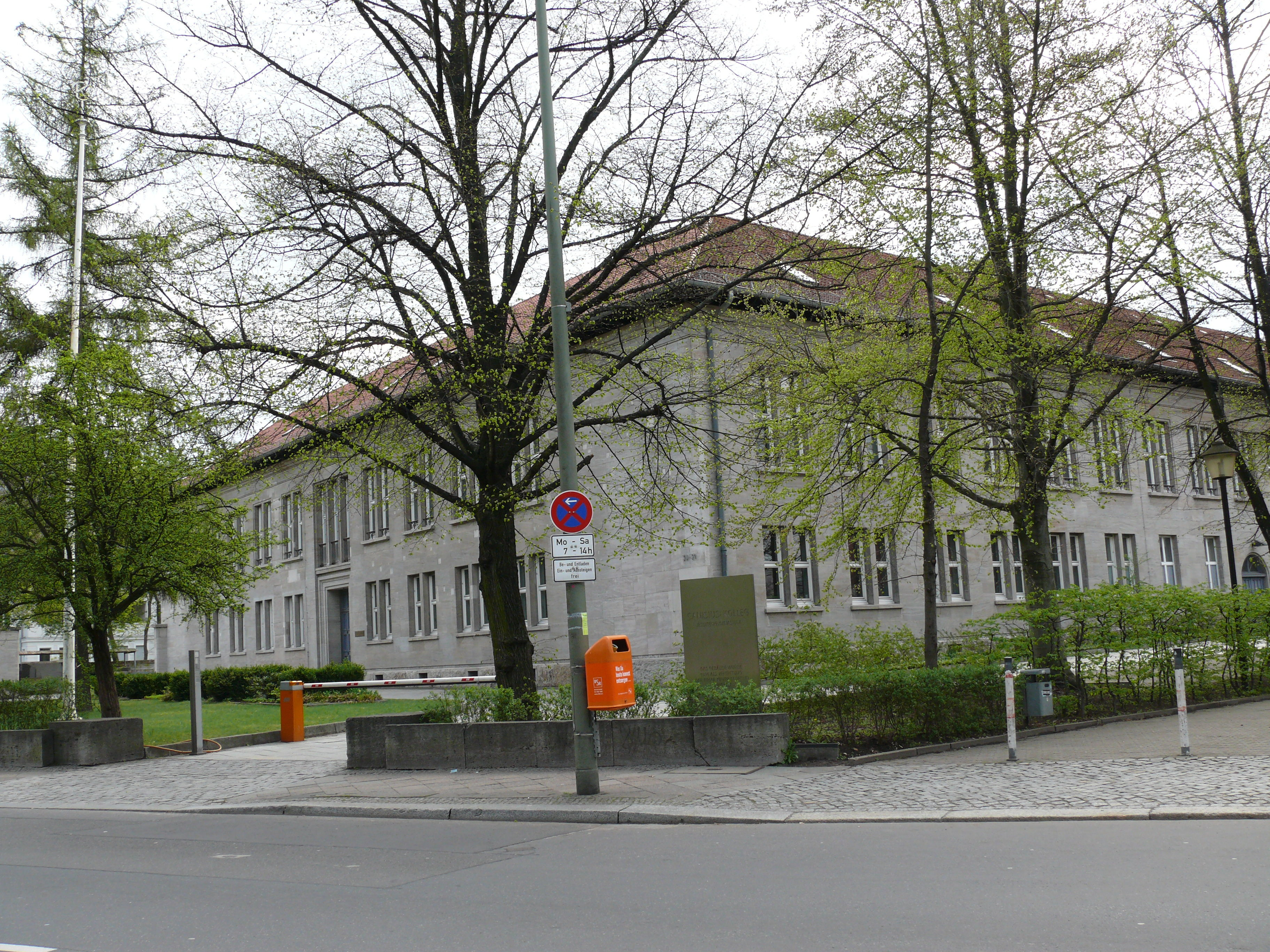

The Canisius-Kolleg Berlin (CK) is a private, Catholic and coeducational Gymnasium (German type of college-preparatory school) directed by the Society of Jesus in Berlin, Germany. The school is named after Saint Peter Canisius. It is known as one of Berlin's most prestigious schools.

== Jesuit college ==
Canisius College Berlin is a Jesuit high school in the tradition of Ignatius of Loyola, the founder of the Jesuits. In this tradition it offers reflection trips – so-called "oases" – social internships, stays abroad, and youth work in the ISG. Canisius is one of three Jesuit colleges in Germany. Unlike the Kolleg St. Blasien and Aloisiuskolleg, however, it has no boarding school.

The school is located in a central but also very calm area next to a large park called "Tiergarten". This is near the Potsdamer Platz in the so-called "diplomatic district" near numerous embassies, including those of Italy, Japan, and Saudi Arabia and other political and economic organizations like CDU's headquarters and KPMG. Just south of the campus on Köbi Road are two American nettle trees which because of their beauty are considered a national monument in the city of Berlin.

== School ==
Canisius College, like the Französisches Gymnasium and the Evangelisches Gymnasium, receives hundreds of applications every year, as the most popular schools in Berlin. About 90 students are accepted in each class, grades five through thirteen. The majority of students are baptized Roman Catholic, with about 20% Protestant. Tuition is €80 per month (€960 per year), which is subsidized by the school for families that have difficulty paying. Financial support comes from Canisius Kolleg Friends and Supporters and from the Canisius College Foundation.

=== Courses and extracurriculars ===
Religion is a compulsory subject up to high school. It can also be chosen for credit in high school. English and Latin are taken from the fifth grade, and after the eighth grade there is a choice of ancient Greek or French, together with natural science. Japanese may be taken from the ninth grade through high school, but not as advanced course. Working groups offer additional foreign languages.

Students can participate in sports, artistic and musical clubs such as photography, literary writing, or theater.

=== School trips and study abroad ===
Class trips usually take place once in the lower level (grades 5-7), in the middle class (8-10), and in the upper stage (11-13). In the middle class, a student exchange is often held instead of a class trip. In the seventh, eighth, ninth, and twelfth grades students in a class can voluntarily join a teacher who accompanies them for reflection and retreats. During the eleventh grade students have the opportunity to go abroad for one year. As a rule, the students have to repeat that school year in Germany; though the school management can wave this.

=== Social internship ===
Since the school year 1987/1988, a four-week service internship has been binding for tenth or eleventh graders. Service takes place mostly in facilities for the disabled, the homeless, children, or people in nursing homes. The purpose is to give students some exposure to "the marginalized, disadvantaged, ostracized, those deprived of their rights and dignity or forced for other reasons to live in difficult conditions."

== History of Canisius College ==
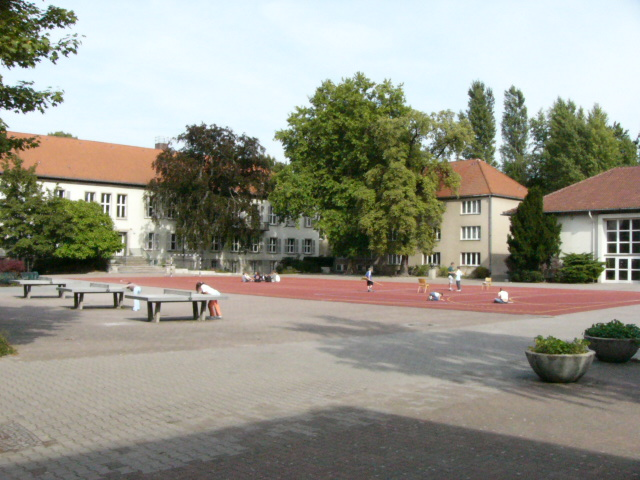

The Jesuits were banned in the German Reich from 1872 to 1917. Then in 1925, at the suggestion of Bishop Josef Deitmer and through the initiative of Bernhard Lichtenberg "the establishment of a private Catholic higher educational institution for male youth" was established. However, the Ministry of Culture forbade using the name Canisius College, so the college officially received its name from its location in Berlin-Charlottenburg: Gymnasium at the Lietzensee.

Beginning of the 1930s, the school had about 500 students, making it the second largest boys' school in Germany. From 1936 the National Socialist government gradually decreed the closure of the school, which was completed by March 1940. During the Second World War, the old school building was completely destroyed. At its refounding on 1 June 1945 the school was officially named Canisius-Kolleg Berlin. Fr. Klein, S.J., appealed to the Allied Control Council on behalf of the five Catholic secondary schools for resumption of their school activities, receiving approval in the spring of 1946. Teaching was conducted in different places in the city. After the acquisition of a building in 1947 and its restoration with the help of the pupils, the school was reopened that year with 500 pupils in twelve classes. Until 1974, Canisius College was an all-boys high school, but then became coeducational.

=== The plot ===
Since the 16th century the Tiergarten was a fenced hunting area, whose southern end reached today's Tiergartenstraße. The area south of the Tiergarten remained undeveloped. At the end of the 18th century, wealthy Berlin citizens began to build summer and country houses there. In 1799, the royal councillor Mölter built a country house on plot 31 Tiergartenstraße with Friedrich Gilly as architect; the adjacent plot 30 remained undeveloped. In 1863 the banker David Hansemann had architect Friedrich Hitzig design a villa on plots 30/31. The house was preserved until its demolition in 1936. In the first half of the 20th century, Tiergartenstraße became the diplomatic quarter; especially from 1938 with the construction of the "Germanic World Capital" foreign representatives were relocated here. After the Second World War, Tiergartenstraße was initially in ruins, largely a wasteland – a condition that changed only slowly after the fall of the Berlin Wall.

=== Krupp headquarters to Jesuits ===
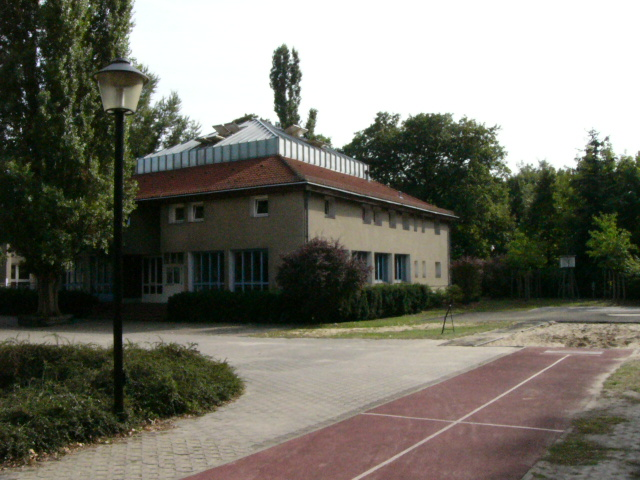
Alfred Delp guest house

The Krupp firm acquired the Tiergartenstraße 30/31 property in 1936. There they built their Berlin headquarters, since the 1933 plans for Berlin forced them to relinquish their previous premises. The headquarters was more than an administrative building; it included housing for the owner's family and guest apartments for senior staff. Paul Mebes and Paul Emmerich were the architects, and completed their work in 1937. The building was slightly damaged in the Second World War, but remained mostly intact along with its furnishings. In 1947 Krupp gave up its headquarters in Berlin and sold the house to the Jesuits. In 1999/2000, the facade and the entrance of the building were restored, with help from Alfried Krupp von Bohlen und Halbach Foundation. The building was enlarged in 1979/1980 and again in 1999/2000. It is now a historical monument. The guest house on the grounds of the College is named after the Jesuit Alfred Delp (1907-1945), sentenced to death for high treason in 1944.

== Alumni ==
After finishing school, former students sometimes retain connections. All former pupils of the Aloisiuskolleg, Kolleg St. Blasien, and the Canisius-Kolleg Berlin can contact each other and see current addresses in the data base at the Stellaner webpage.

== Allegations of child sexual abuse ==
In 2004 and 2005, two former students of the school told the headmaster of the school that they had been sexually abused by two of their former teachers in the 1970s and in the 1980s. In December 2009 and January 2010, two other boys contacted the headmaster and claimed the same about the same teachers. The headmaster decided to write a letter to all former students in which he stated that he was deeply sorry for what happened. An investigative report detailing allegations of substantial abuse was released in 2010, with abuse ranging from beating on the bare buttocks to more overt sexual abuse on the part of three Jesuits. More apologies and financial compensations were issued to the sex abuse victims as well.

== See also ==
- Aloisiuskolleg
- Education in Germany
- Kolleg St. Blasien
- List of Jesuit sites
