= Praedinius Gymnasium =

Coordinates: 53.2211°N 6.5716°E

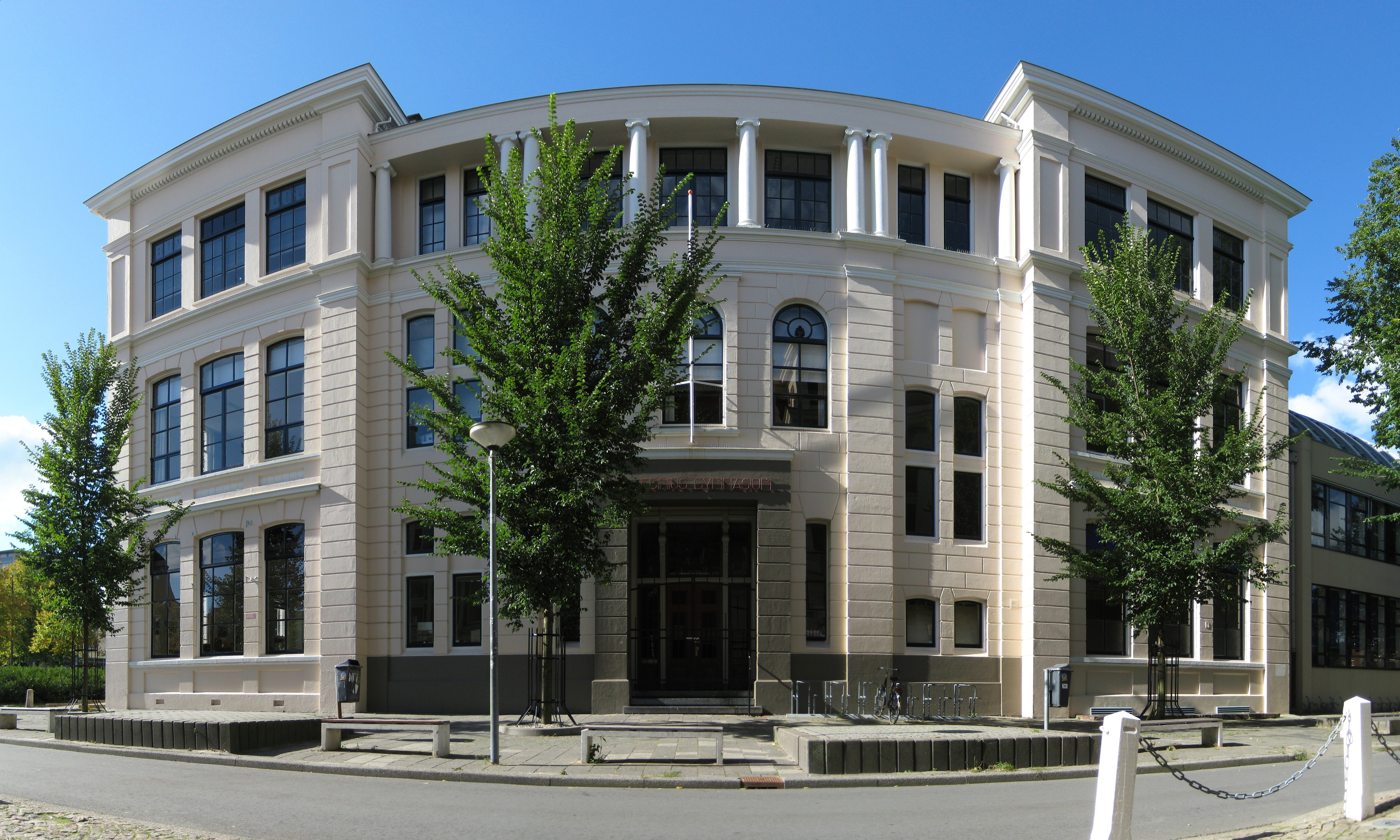
The main building of the Praedinius Gymnasium in 2010. It was built in 1880-82 and designed by the Dutch architect J.G. van Beusekom (1825–1881).

Praedinius Gymnasium is a gymnasium in Groningen, the Netherlands. It dates back to the fourteenth century and is the larger of two non-comprehensive gymnasia in Groningen, the other being Willem Lodewijk Gymnasium.

== History ==
Fourteenth century records show that an early predecessor of the Praedinius Gymnasium, the Schole tho Sunte Meerten, was situated at the current location of the Provinciehuis (Province Hall). Gradually, the school grew and attracted students from the Netherlands and abroad, and the name was changed to Latijnse school (Latin school). In 1595, when Ubbo Emmius was rector, the school moved to the old Minderbroederklooster. Later, in 1847, the Latijnse school became a gymnasium, and the name was changed to Stedelijk Gymnasium. Fourteen years later, the school moved to a new building, at the location of the current Harmonie. In 1865, the location was changed to the Martinikerkhof. On 1 September 1882, the school moved for the last time, to a new building at the Turfsingel. In 1947, on the school's first centenary, the school was named after rector Regnerus Praedinius, and the name became Praedinius Gymnasium. In 1999, due to a lack of space, a second building, the old industrial school, was added to the Praedinius.

== Famous Alumni ==
- Thijs Berman (1957)
- Eelco Bosch van Rosenthal (1976)
- Naomi Ellemers (1963)
- Johan Adriaan Feith (1858–1913)
- Seth Gaaikema (1939–2014)
- Johan Huizinga (1872–1945)
- Henk Koning (1933–2016)
- Ruud Koning (1966)
- Bert Luttjeboer (1960–1995)
- Reneke de Marees van Swinderen (1860–1955)
- Christine Mohrmann (1903–1988)
- Jan Samuel Niehoff (1923–2014)
- Henk van Os (1938)
- Nico Rost (1896–1967)
- Martijn van Sonderen (1984)
- Janka Stoker (1970)
- René Veenstra (1969)
- Elske ter Veld (1944–2017)
- Hendrik de Waard (1922–2008)
- Bert Wagenaar van Kreveld (1968)
- Rob Wijnberg (1982)
- Thijs de Vlieger (1982)

== See also ==
- Education in the Netherlands
