= Dušan Vasiljev Gymnasium, Kikinda =

Dušan Vasiljev Gymnasium

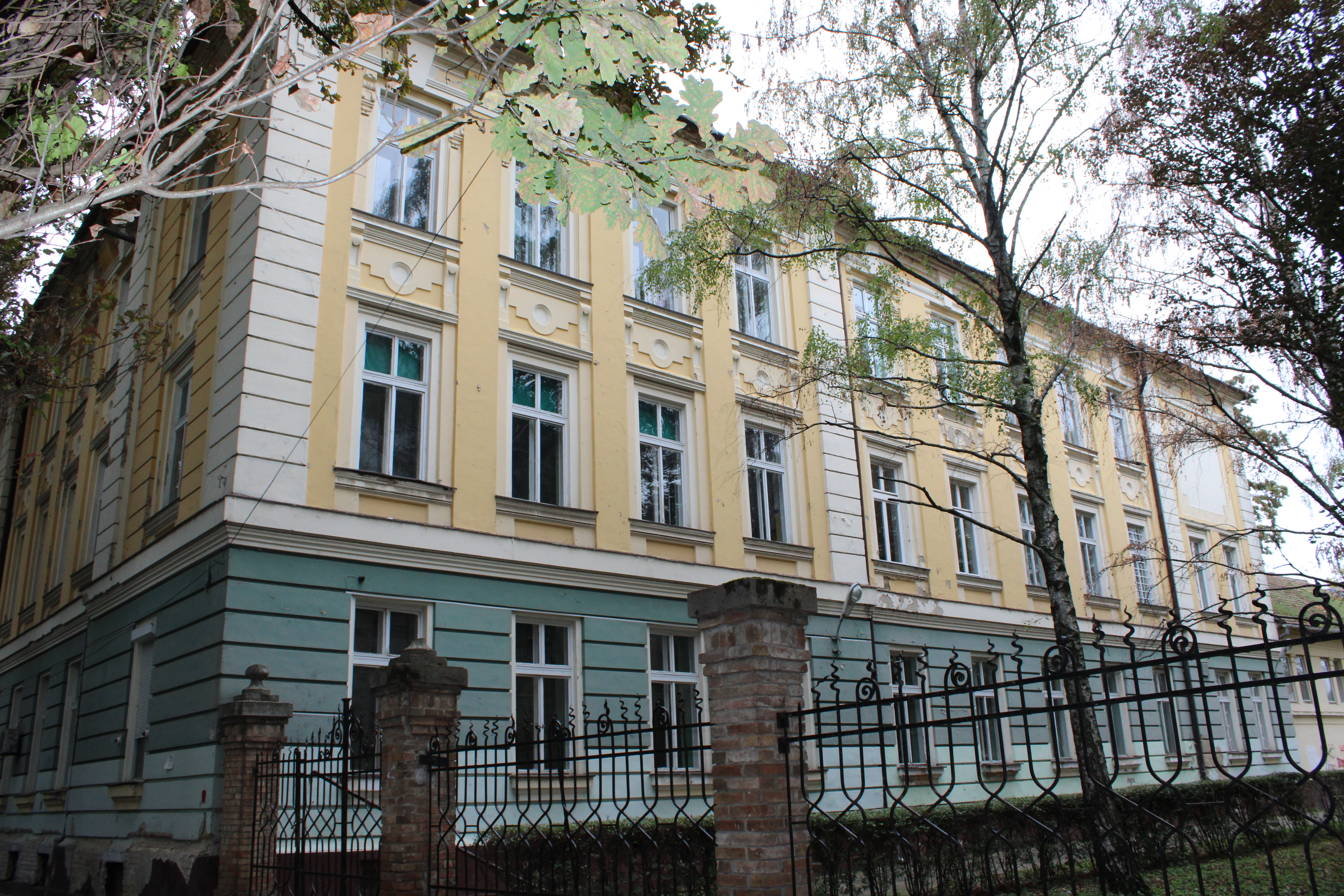

Location
- Trg srpskih dobrovoljaca 35; Kikinda, Vojvodina; Serbia
- Coordinates: 45.8312°N 20.4647°E

Information
- Type: public school
- Established: 1858; 168 years ago
- Campus: Urban
- Website: www.gimnazijaki.rs

The Dušan Vasiljev Gymnasium (Serbian: Гимназија Душан Васиљев, Gimnazija Dušan Vasiljev), colloquially known as the Kikinda Gymnasium, is a public coeducational high school (gymnasium, similar to preparatory school), located in Kikinda, city in Vojvodina, Serbia.

== History ==
Kikinda Gymnasium, initially known as Nagykikinda/Velika Kikinda Gymnasium, was founded in 1858 as the first secondary school in Kikinda. By 1900, a new eight-year gymnasium started operating in a purpose-built building with classes conducted in Hungarian language. Between its founding and World War I, the school graduated 421 students of whom only 49 were from the local Serb community. After the end of World War I and the establishment of the Kingdom of Serbs, Croats and Slovenes the Gymnasium adopted the curriculum of the pre-war Kingdom of Serbia. Post-World War II, the school reopened on September 10, 1945, with classes offered in both Serbian and Hungarian. In 1959, the school was named after Dušan Vasiljev, a poet from Kikinda. From 1977 to 1993 the school lost its name and building but returned to its historic premises in 1994.

The Gymnasium marked its 164th anniversary in 2022. The event included a wreath-laying ceremony at the bust of Dušan Vasiljev, workshops on Expressionism, and an award ceremony held at the National Museum Hall.
