= Svetozar Marković Gymnasium, Novi Sad =

High school in Novi Sad, Serbia

Svetozar Marković Gymnasium
- Гимназија "Светозар Марковић"; Gimnazija "Svetozar Marković"
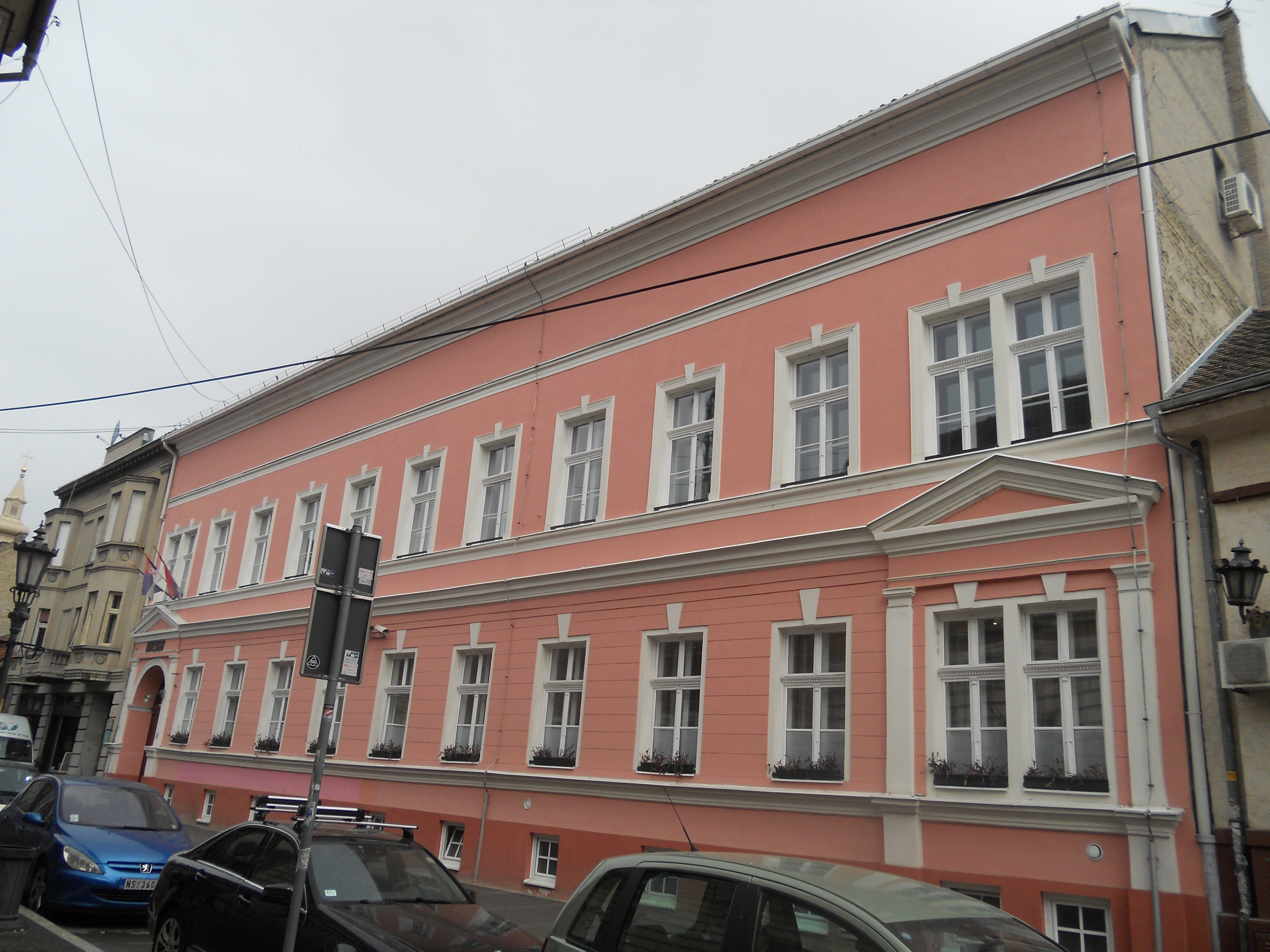
- Gymnasium building, May 2020

Location
- Njegoševa 22; Novi Sad, South Bačka, Vojvodina; Serbia
- Coordinates: 45.25722222°N 19.84305556°E

Information
- School type: Public, gymnasium
- Established: 27 July 1963; 62 years ago
- Status: open
- Principal: Dr Tatjana Vukadinović
- Gender: Coeducational
- Enrollment: approx. 1.100
- Language: Serbian, Hungarian
- Newspaper: "Gimnazijalac" (2014–2019) "Bilten" (2018) "Furkcszo"
- Website: www.s-markovic.edu.rs

Svetozar Marković Gymnasium (Serbian: Гимназија "Светозар Марковић", Gimnazija "Svetozar Marković") is a secondary school in Novi Sad, Serbia. It is named after Svetozar Marković, a famous Serbian political activist, literary critic and socialist philosopher. It was founded as an independent teaching institution in 1963, but its roots stem from the Novi Sad Orthodox Gymnasium which was founded in 1810. The school provides education for grades 9 through 12, with 36 classrooms in total. Classes are done through a general course in Serbian and Hungarian.

== History ==
=== Beginnings ===
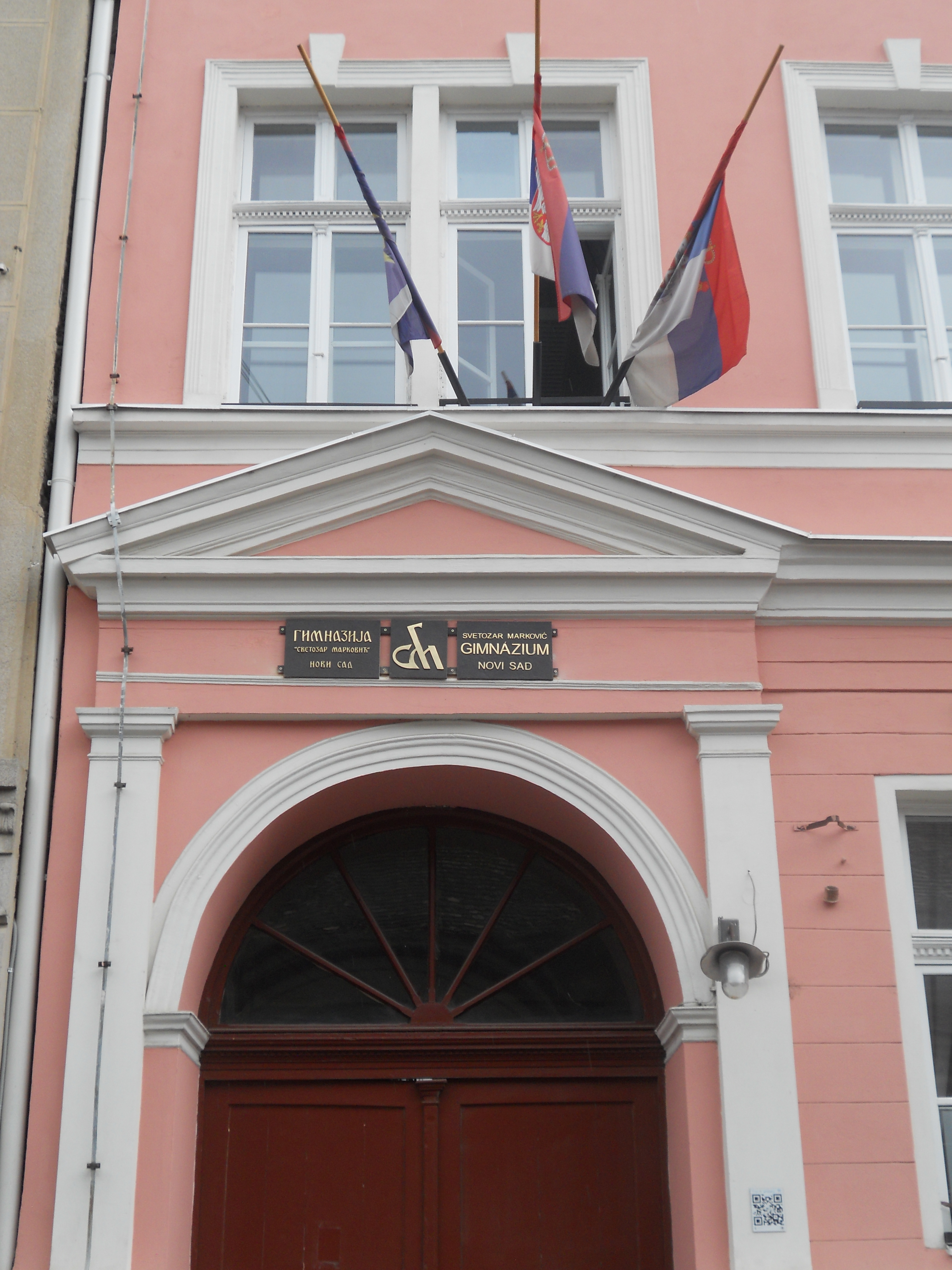
Gymnasium entrance, May 2020

The history of Svetozar Marković Gymnasium is inextricably linked to other Novi Sad gymnasiums. Three gymnasiums opened on 28 February 1945: Men's Real Gymnasium (located in the "Platoneuma" building); Women's Real Gymnasium, which started in the building of the former Serbian Civic School (men's and women's) in Negoševa 22, and just across the street in Negoševa 9, in the building of the Catholic monastery "Kloster" (former residence of Isidor Bajić Music School), where for a time the Hungarian Civic School moved into the Mixed Real Gymnasium. At Futoška Street (in the building of today's Mihajlo Pupin Electrical School) was the Đuro Daničić Gymnasium done in Serbian and Pap Pavle Gymnasium in Hungarian, which since 1957 have merged under the single name Moša Pijade.

Since the proclaimed principle of the separation of church and state, and since the church has become only one of many social organizations, the school's teaching becomes universal, based on scientific foundations, without religious interference or influence.

Following the liberation of all places in Vojvodina and the ousting of the Military Administration, a new stage in the development of education and training begins, the foundations of which date back to the socialist revolution of Yugoslavia and will continue until 1957. This next period had varied phases until the first major school reforms in the early 1960s. The very beginning is characterized by expansion and the desire to educate as many citizen as possible. This was also the case in Novi Sad and in the Higher Mixed Gymnasium, where in the first years after the revolution the school's eighth grade had more than a 1,000 pupils.

=== Reforms and naming ===
Soon after schools started moving, finding new, larger and more appropriate areas for teaching. Mixed Gymnasium moves from "Kloster" to the Serbian Grand Orthodox Gymnasium of Novi Sad (today's Jovan Jovanović Zmaj Gymnasium) building on 30 June 1945, from which the Bulgarian army finally left, while Men's Real Gymnasium moved from "Platoneum" to JNA Street 77 (building of today's Electrical School).

The "Real" status was removed from gymnasiums in 1948. The Men's consistently remained Men's Gymnasium until 1950, while the Mixed Gymnasium became the Comprehensive Mixed Gymnasium in 1949. In 1951, they both became more mixed gymnasiums because Men's and Women's Gymnasium were merged. Soon, both First and Second Mixed Gymnasium were moved to an old high school building near the Saborna Church.

In 1952, a new reorganization followed. In that year, the lower classes (from 1st to 4th) were selected from all the gymnasiums and attached to primary schools, so that the gymnasiums became upper secondary four-year schools.

That same year, the Svetozar Marković Secondary Mixed Gymnasium and the Jovan Jovanovic Zmaj Secondary Mixed Gymnasium were formed. The move, among other things, has meant that most of the major subjects in gymnasiums were professionally represented. In the 1952/53 school year, 112 students enrolled at the Svetozar Marković Secondary Mixed Gymnasium, which was divided into three departments. The Principal was Novak Radović.

In 1960. National Republic of Serbia has opted for the introduction of two-courses Gymnasiums, the science-mathematics and humanities-linguistics courses has been introduced. In the 1959/1960 school year there was a merger of the Svetozar Marković and Jovan Jovanović Zmaj mixed gymnasiums into a single school, attended by 787 students that year.

=== First gymnasium re-founding ===
Svetozar Markovic Gymnasium was re-established in 1963. Teachings started in the building of the then Electrical School near the Post Office building. The electrical school occupied the ground floor and the first floor, and the gymnasium occupied the second floor.

Preparations for work were made at the Jovan Jovanovic Zmaj Gymnasium and the Moša Pijade Gymnasium. At the Jovan Jovanović Zmaj Gymnasium in the previous 1962/63 school years, there were two second year classrooms (one humanities-linguistics and the other science-mathematics) and four first year classrooms, prepared for the transition to the new Gymnasium. These departments did not even teach in the Jovan Jovanović Zmaj Gymnasium building, but in the Đorđe Natošević primary school building. A number of professors have graduated from Jovan Jovanović Zmaj and Moša Pijade gymnasiums moved to the new gymnasium.

After 1966, the Svetozar Marković Gymnasium was officially elected by the Republican Institute for Basic Education and Teacher Education as an "experimental" school, in which theses programs on pupil education would be carry out.

Since 1971, the gymnasium has moved to the building where it is housed today. In the 1970s, the school taught a joint secondary education program. This type of class lasted until 1983.

=== Reorganization and change of purpose ===
In 1983, the gymnasium has been re-organised and is changing its name to the Svetozar Marković Pedagogy Academy OOUR Secondary School. The school is registered as a Worker's Organisation of Pedagogy Academy with two OOUR's: Svetozar Marković OOUR Secondary School and Moša Pijade Secondary School. In the 1985/86 school year, the first generation of the educational profession, whose professional education lasted four years, was enrolled. The school was organised in Serbian and Hungarian languages.

=== Second gymnasium re-founding ===
Svetozar Marković Gymnasium was re-founded in 1990 as a general course gymnasium. Since 1996, the gymnasium was expanded, adding a building in Laze Lazarevića Street 1 in Telep. Since 1997, the Laza Kostić Gymnasium has been established in the area of Telep where the extended department of Svetozar Marković Gymnasium was originally located.

== Notable alumni ==
- Aleksandra Ivošev, 1996 Summer Olympics gold and bronze medalist in sport shooting
- Dušan Kovačević, playwright, scriptwriter, film director, academic best known for his theatre plays and movie scripts, served as the ambassador of Serbia in Lisbon, Portugal
- Tea Tairović, singer, songwriter and dancer
