= Laza Kostić Gymnasium =

High school in Novi Sad, Serbia

- Гимназија "Лаза Костић"; Gimnazija "Laza Kostić"
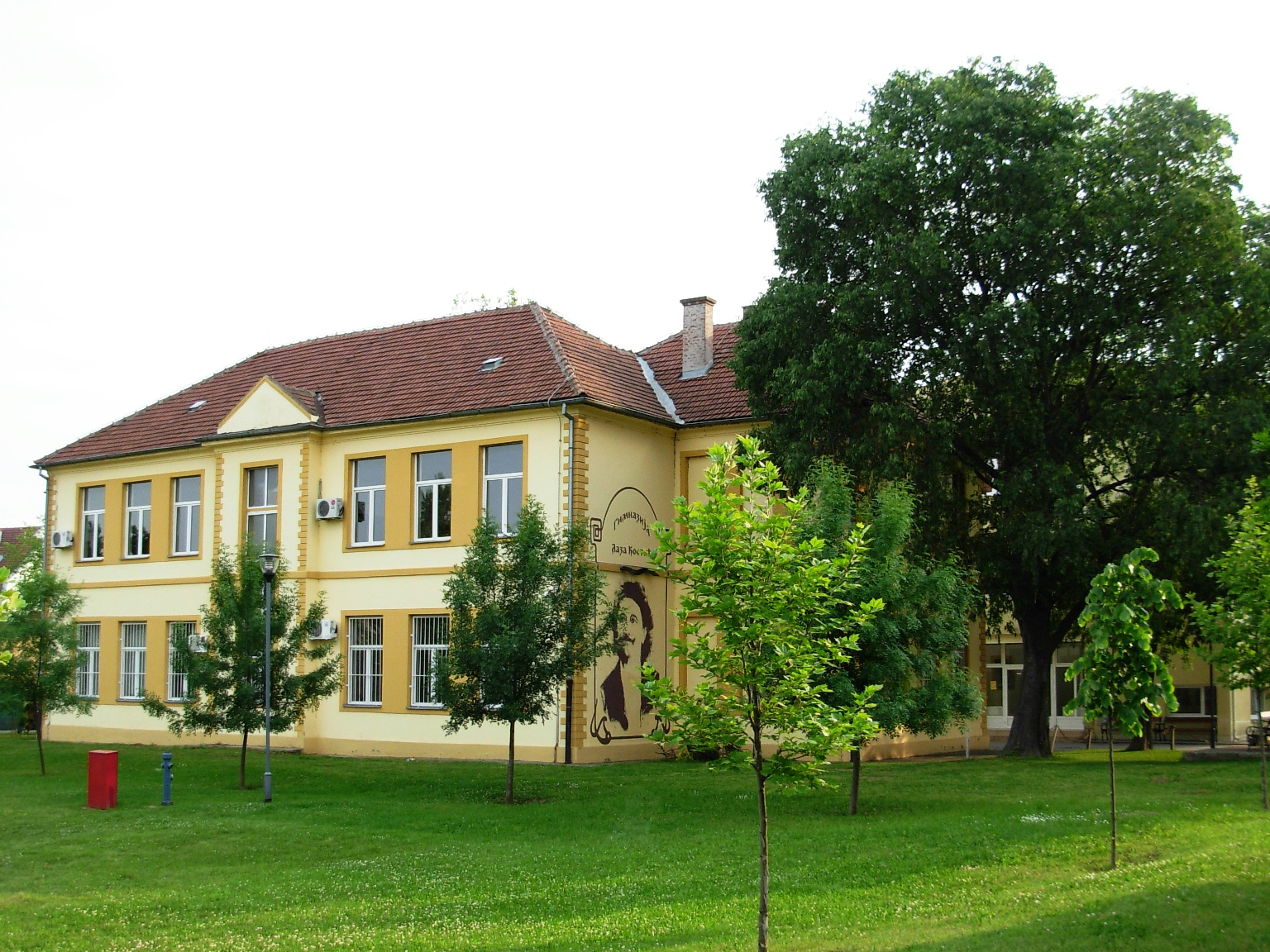
- Front view of the main Gymnasium building

Location
- Laze Lazarevića 1 Novi Sad, South Bačka, Vojvodina; Serbia
- Coordinates: 45.23861111°N 19.82055556°E

Information
- School type: Public, gymnasium
- Established: 1 September 1996; 29 years ago
- Status: open
- Principal: Vukašin Lazović
- Gender: Coeducational
- Language: Serbian
- Newspaper: Kalambur
- Website: gimnazijalazakostic.edu.rs

Laza Kostić Gymnasium (Serbian: Гимназија "Лаза Костић", Gimnazija "Laza Kostić") is a secondary school in Novi Sad, Serbia. It is named after Laza Kostić, a famous Serbian writer and poet. It was founded in 1996, and is the youngest of the four gymnasiums in Novi Sad. Classes are done exclusively in Serbian.

== History ==
While Laza Kostić Gymnasium is one of the youngest gymnasiums in the country, the building it resides in was built in 1926. Several schools would exchange the use of the building, until 1 September 1996, when the department of Svetozar Marković Gymnasium was formed. On 28 May 1998, it was temporarily named as Gymnasium with full responsibility, while on 17 May 2000, the government decided to rename the school to its current name of Gymnasium "Laza Kostić".

In 2006, the school was extensively renovated, when the old pavilions were replaced by two modern school buildings, where most of the classes and the school theater are held. The renovations were completed by fall of 2007.

Since 2008, the Novi Sad New Theater (Serbian: Новосадски Нови Театар, Novosadski Novi Teatar) is hosted in the school with the goal of spreading the love of theater and dramatic performances among the youth through local and international theater performances.

In May 2023, plans for the school gym building for physical education classes were revealed. The construction is set to be completed for the 2025/26 school year, with an estimated cost around half a million Serbian dinars.
