= Christelijk Gymnasium Utrecht =

Coordinates: 52.082°N 5.121°E

The Christelijk Gymnasium Utrecht is a Dutch grammar school in Utrecht, in the Netherlands. It was founded in 1897.

The Koni or West is building of the school, located on the Koningsbergerstraat in Lombok, which explains its nickname Koni. The school is located in the building of a former secondary school, the De Bruijne Lyceum.

The Diac or Oost was the former building. It was located in the city centre, on the Oudegracht and near the Ledig Erf and the Twijnstraat. This part of the school doesn't exist anymore.

The CGU has about 943 pupils, 70 teachers, 5 headmasters and 14 other employees.

== About the CGU ==
The Christelijk Gymnasium Utrecht was founded in 1897 on the Janskerkhof, with only 13 students and only one girl. In the thirties, the school moved to a bigger location, the Diaconessenstraat. Recently, the school has gone through a long period of searching for a building big enough to house all students. Before 2006, the school was located in two buildings on the Oudegracht, at walking distance called the Diac and the PAS. The school even had a third location in the academic year 2005–2006 on the campus of University College Utrecht. The PAS has now been closed and the University College-location couldn't be maintained in academic year 2006–2007. The school was first promised a building on a street near the Central Station, but the costs required to refurbish the building were too high.

The marks of the CGU on national examinations have been above average for many years. In the year of 2005, the school was listed 7th on a nationwide ranking. In the schoolyear 2006–2007, 99 out of 100 students doing their final examinations passed. In 2011, the school was listed 1st on a nationwide ranking.

== School song ==
The anthem of the Christelijk Gymnasium Utrecht was penned by Dr. Dolf Peeters and was created in 1946/47 to commemorate the school's 50th anniversary.
