= Willem Lodewijk Gymnasium =

Coordinates: 53.2083°N 6.5503°E

- Groningen

Information
- Type: Gymnasium
- Denomination: Christian
- Founded: 1909
- Rector: Mrs. E. van der Velden
- Staff: 78
- Enrollment: 710 (2014/15)
- Website: http://www.wlg.nl/

The Willem Lodewijk Gymnasium is a Christian gymnasium (secondary school) in Groningen, Netherlands. It is the smaller of two non-comprehensive gymnasiums in Groningen, along with Praedinius Gymnasium. As of 2015, the gymnasium had approximately 710 students and 78 staff members.

== History ==
On March 11, 1909, a group of parents founded the school. It was named the Willem Lodewijk Gymnasium after Count William Louis of Nassau-Dillenburg.

== Academic results ==
An average of 71% of all students pass the Dutch final exams without repeating a class. The average mark for the final exams is 6.8 out of 10.

== Facilities ==
The gymnasium was originally located at 46 Oosterstraat. In 1923, it was relocated to 11 Oosterstraat as enrollment increased. In 1969, the school relocated to 220 Verzetstrijderslaan.
