= Bibliography of Pope Pius XII =

This bibliography on Church policies 1939–1945 includes mainly Italian publications relative to Pope Pius XII and Vatican policies during World War II . Two areas are missing and need separate bibliographies at a later date.

- The bibliography does not include theology, theological issues and publications on the Theology of Pope Pius XII, Mariology of Pope Pius XII, on his ecclesiastical promulgations such as the dogma of the Assumption of the Virgin Mary, Church reforms, or, the Beatifications of Pope Pius XII, Saints canonized by Pope Pius XII, Encyclicals of the Pontiff and other theological issues.
- Policies after World War Two are also not included such as Pope Pius XII Church policies after World War II, Persecutions of the Catholic Church and Pius XII, and Vatican policies regarding the Church in Russia, Poland and China and other countries.

== A ==
- ADSS – Actes et Documents du Saint-Siège relatifs à la Seconde guerre mondiale. Libreria Editrice Vaticana, Città del Vaticano 1972. (in English, French, and Italian)
- Giorgio Angelozzi Gariboldi. Pio XII, Hitler e Mussolini. Mursia, Milan 1988. ISBN 88-425-2875-7
- Mark Aarons e John Loftus. Unholy Trinity: The Vatican, The Nazist and the Swiss Banks. St Martin's Press, New York 1998. ISBN 0-312-18199-X. (in English)
- David Alvaretz. Spie in Vaticano. Newton & Compton, Rome 2003. ISBN 88-8289-919-5

== B ==
- Zygmunt Bauman. Modernità e Olocausto, trad. it. di Massimo Baldini, il Mulino, Bologna 1992, pp. 280, ISBN 88-15-03686-5 (versione online)
- Gerhard Besier. Der heilige Stuhl und Hitler-Deutschland, Die Faszination des Totalitären. DVA, München 2004. ISBN 3-421-05814-8. (in German)
- Luigi Bizzarri. Il principe di Dio. La vera storia di Pio XII. Ancora 2004.
- Pierre Blet S.J. Pio XII e la seconda guerra mondiale negli archivi vaticani. Edizioni San Paolo, Cinisello Balsamo 1999, pp. 392, ISBN 88-215-4078-2.
- Schneider Burkhart. Pio XII. Con un contributo del rabbino David Dalin in difesa del pontefice, Edizioni San Paolo, 2002, pp. 160, ISBN 88-215-0797-1

== C ==
- Judith Cabaud. Il rabbino che si arrese a Cristo, Edizioni San Paolo, 2002
- Jorge Camarasa. Organizzazione Odessa. Mursia, Milan 1998. ISBN 88-425-2342-9
- James Carroll. Constantine’s Sword. The Church and the Jews: A History [La spada di Costantino. La Chiesa e gli ebrei. Una storia], Houghton Mifflin Company, Boston (Massachusetts) 2001.
- Luigi Castiglione. Pio XII e il nazismo. Borla, Turin 1965.
- Philippe Chenaux. Pio XII. Diplomatico e Pastore. Edizioni San Paolo, 2004.
- John Cornwell. Il papa di Hitler (Hitler's Pope: The Secret History of Pius XII, Viking 1999). Garzanti, Milan 2000. ISBN 88-11-67682-7
- Franco Cuomo. I dieci. Chi erano gli scienziati italiani che firmarono il manifesto della razza. Baldini Castoldi Dalai, Milan 2005. ISBN 88-8490-825-6

== D ==
- Francesca Di Giovanni, Giuseppina Roselli. Inter arma caritas. L’Ufficio Informazioni Vaticano per i prigionieri di guerra, istituito da Pio XII (1939–1947), Archivio Segreto Vaticano, Città del Vaticano, 2004 .
- David G. Dalin. La leggenda nera del papa di Hitler (The Myth of Hitler's Pope). Piemme 2007

== F ==
- Carlo Falconi. Il silenzio di Pio XII. Papa Pacelli e il nazifascismo. Kaos, Milan 2006. ISBN 88-7953-158-1
- Emma Fattorini. Germania e Santa Sede. Le nunziature di Pacelli tra la Grande Guerra e la Repubblica di Weimar. Il Mulino, Bologna 1992. ISBN 88-15-03648-2.
- Emma Fattorini, Pio XII, Hitler e Mussolini. La solitudine di un papa, Einaudi 2007
- Michael F. Feldkamp. Die Beziehungen der Bundesrepublik Deutschland zum Heiligen Stuhl 1949–1966. Aus den Vatikanakten des Auswärtigen Amts. Eine Dokumentation, Colonia et al., 2000, ISBN 3-412-03399-5 (in German)
- Michael F. Feldkamp. Pius XII. und Deutschland, Göttingen 2000, ISBN 3-525-34026-5 (recensione critica: ) (in German)
- Michael F. Feldkamp. Goldhagens unwillige Kirche. Alte und neue Fälschungen über Kirche und Papst während der NS-Herrschaft, Monaco di B., 2003, ISBN 3-7892-8127-1 (in German)
- Saul Friedländer. L’ambiguità del bene. Il caso del nazista pentito Kurt Gerstein. Mondadori, Milan 2002. ISBN 88-424-9592-1
- Saul Friedländer. Pio XII e il Terzo Reich. Documenti, Feltrinelli, Milan 1965.

== G ==
- Luigi Ganapini. La repubblica delle camicie nere. Garzanti, Milan 1999. ISBN 978-88-11-69309-3
- Carlo Gasbarri. Quando il Vaticano confinava con il Terzo Reich. Messaggero, Padua 1984. ISBN 88-7026-541-2
- Antonio Gaspari. Gli ebrei salvati da Pio XII, Logos, Rome 2001.
- Peter Godman. Hitler e il Vaticano. Dagli archivi segreti vaticani la vera storia dei rapporti fra il nazismo e la Chiesa (Der Vatikan und Hitler. Die geheimen Archive. Droemer, Ulm 2004). Lindau, Turin 2005. ISBN 88-7180-558-5
- Daniel Jonah Goldhagen. Una questione morale. La chiesa cattolica e l’olocausto. Mondadori, Milan 2003. ISBN 88-04-51253-9
- Uki Goni. Operazione Odessa. Garzanti, Milan 2003. ISBN 88-11-69405-1
- Giordano Bruno Guerri. Gli italiani sotto la chiesa. Mondadori, Milan 1992. ISBN 88-04-43469-4
- Patrick J. Gallo. Pius XII, the Holocaust and the Revisionists, 2006

== H ==
- Raul Hilberg. La distruzione degli ebrei d’Europa, trad. it., n. ed. riveduta e ampliata, a cura di Frediano Sessi, 2 voll., Einaudi, Turin 1999. ISBN 88-06-14592-4
- Rolf Hochhuth. Il Vicario, dramma in 5 atti, trad. it., con una prefazione di Carlo Bo, Feltrinelli, Milan 1964. (l'opera che per alcuni ha iniziato la "leggenda nera" su Pio XII)
- Rolf Hochhuth. Il vicario (Der Stellvertreter. Ein christliches Trauerspiel, 1963, trad. di I. Pizzetti). Wizarts Editore, P.S. Elpidio (AP), nuova ed. 2003. ISBN 88-88510-16-8
- Alois Hudal. Die Grundlagen des Nationalsozialismus: eine ideengeschichtliche Untersuchung von Katholischer Warte. Leipzig-Wien 1937. (in German)

== I ==
- Johan Ickx. Le Bureau. Les Juifs de Pie XII. Éditions VdH, Melsele 2020. ISBN 978-2-7499-3747-2 (in French)

== K ==
- David Kertzer. I papi contro gli ebrei. Il ruolo del Vaticano nell’ascesa dell’antisemitismo moderno. Rizzoli, Milan 2002. ISBN 88-17-86947-3

== L ==
- Annie Lacroix-Riz. Le Vatican, l’Europe et le Reich de la Premiere Guerre mondiale à la Guerre froide. Armand Colin, Paris 1996. ISBN 2-200-21641-6. (in French)
- Pinchas Emilio Lapide. Roma e gli ebrei. L’azione del Vaticano a favore delle vittime del Nazismo, trad. it., Mondadori, Milan 1967.
- Jeno Levai. Hungarian Jewry and the papacy. Pope Pius XII did not remain silent. Reports, documents and records from church and state archives assembled by Jeno Levai [L’ebraismo ungherese e il papato. Papa Pio XII non restò in silenzio. Resoconti, documenti e testimonianze dagli archivi ecclesiastici e statali raccolti da Jeno Levai], ed. inglese, con introduzione di Robert M. W. Kempner, Sands and Co. Ltd., Londra 1968.
- Guenter Lewy. I nazisti e la chiesa. Net, Milan, 2002. ISBN 88-515-2019-4
- Guenter Lewy. I nazisti e la Chiesa, trad. it., Il Saggiatore, Milan 1965.
- Joseph L. Lichten. Pio XII e gli ebrei, trad. it., Edizioni Dehoniane, Bologna 1988.

== M ==
- Marilyn Mallory, Pope Pius XII and the Jews: What's True and What's Fiction?, Amazon.com, Kindle 2012, pp. 220, ASIN: B006KLOARW
- Margherita Marchione, Pio XII e gli ebrei, Editoriale Pantheon, Rome 1999, Piemme, Casale Monferrato 2002, pp. 288, ISBN 88-384-6483-9
- Margherita Marchione, Pio XII attraverso le immagini, Libreria Editrice Vaticana, 2000, pp. 216, ISBN 88-209-7338-3
- Margherita Marchione, Pio XII. Architetto di pace, Editoriale Pantheon, Rome 2000, Piemme, Casale Monferrato 2002, pp. 416, ISBN 88-384-6482-0
- Margherita Marchione, Il silenzio di Pio XII, prefazione di Antonio Spinosa, traduzione di Ingenito M., Sperling & Kupfer, Milan 2002, pp. XXIV–308, ISBN 88-200-3437-9
- Margherita Marchione, La mia vita. Incontri con i papi e i letterati del '900, Libreria Ancora, Milan 2003, pp. 160, ISBN 88-514-0092-X
- Margherita Marchione, Pio XII. Il papa dei bambini, Editrice Shalom, Camerata Picena 2004, pp. 32, ISBN 88-8404-059-0
- Margherita Marchione, Pio XII è veramente un santo, Editrice Shalom, Camerata Picena 2004, pp. ..., ISBN ... (da verificare)
- Margherita Marchione, Crociata di carità. L'impegno di Pio XII per i prigionieri della seconda guerra mondiale, Sperling & Kupfer, 2006, pp. XXXII–414, ISBN 88-200-4204-5
- Ralph McInerny. The Defamation of Pius XII [La diffamazione di Pio XII], St. Augustine's, South Bend (Indiana) 2000.
- Gerald Messadié. Storia dell’antisemitismo. Piemme, Casale Monferrato (AL) 2002. ISBN 88-384-6921-0
- Giovanni Miccoli. I dilemmi e i silenzi di Pio XII. Rizzoli, Milan, 2000. ISBN 88-17-86364-5
- Georges Minois. La chiesa e la guerra. Dalla Bibbia all’era atomica. Dedalo, Bari 2003. ISBN 978-88-220-0552-6
- Renato Moro, La Chiesa e lo sterminio degli ebrei, Il Mulino, Bologna, 2002.

== N ==
- Matteo Luigi Napolitano e Andrea Tornielli. Il Papa che salvò gli ebrei. Dagli archivi segreti del Vaticano tutta la verità su Pio XII, Piemme, Casale Monferrato 2004, pp. 202, ISBN 88-384-8403-1
- Matteo Luigi Napolitano. Pio XII tra guerra e pace. Profezia e diplomazia di un papa (1939–1945), Città Nuova, 2002, pp. 294, ISBN 88-311-0336-9

== P ==
- Giovanni Maria Pace. La via dei demoni. La fuga in Sudamerica dei criminali nazisti: segreti, complicità, silenzi. Sperling & Kupfer, Milan 2000. ISBN 88-200-3034-9
- Léon Papeleux. Les silences de Pie XII. Vokaer, Bruxelles 1980. (in French)
- Georges Passelecq, Bernard Suchecky. L’enciclica nascosta di Pio XI. Un’occasione mancata dalla chiesa cattolica nei confronti dell’antisemitismo. Corbaccio, Milan 1997. ISBN 88-7972-209-3
- Phayer, Michael (2000). The Catholic Church and the Holocaust, 1930–1965. Bloomington and Indianapolis: Indiana University Press. ISBN 0253214718.
- Phayer, Michael (2008). Pius XII, the Holocaust, and the Cold War. Bloomington and Indianapolis: Indiana University Press. ISBN 9780253349309.

== R ==
- Barbara Raggi, Ruggero Taradel. La segregazione amichevole. «La Civiltà Cattolica» e la questione ebraica 1850–1945, Editori Riuniti, Rome 2000. ISBN 88-359-4818-5
- Anthony Rhodes. Il Vaticano e le dittature: 1922–1945 (tit. or. The Vatican in the Age of the Dictators: 1922–1945. Hodder & Stoughton, London 1973). Mursia, Milan 1975. SBN IT\ICCU\RLZ\0038325
- Andrea Riccardi (a cura di), Pio XII, Laterza, Bari, 1985
- Ernesto Rossi. Il manganello e l’aspersorio. 1ª ed. Parenti, Florence 1958. Nuova ed. Kaos, Milan 2000. ISBN 88-7953-094-1
- Rivelli, Marco Aurelio (1998). Le génocide occulté: État Indépendant de Croatie 1941–1945 [Hidden Genocide: The Independent State of Croatia 1941–1945] (in French). Lausanne: L'age d'Homme. ISBN 9782825111529.
- Rivelli, Marco Aurelio (1999). L'arcivescovo del genocidio: Monsignor Stepinac, il Vaticano e la dittatura ustascia in Croazia, 1941-1945 [The Archbishop of Genocide: Monsignor Stepinac, the Vatican and the Ustaše dictatorship in Croatia, 1941-1945] (in Italian). Milan: Kaos. ISBN 9788879530798.
- Rivelli, Marco Aurelio (2002). "Dio è con noi!": La Chiesa di Pio XII complice del nazifascismo ["God is with us!": The Church of Pius XII accomplice to Nazi Fascism] (in Italian). Milan: Kaos. ISBN 9788879531047.
- Robert Ventresca, Soldier of Christ. The Life of Pope Pius XII, Harvard University Press, 2013, p. 405, ISBN 0674049616

== S ==
- Pietro Scoppola. La chiesa e il fascismo. Documenti e interpretazioni. 1ª ed. 1971. Nuova ed. con prefazione Laterza, Bari-Rome 2006. ISBN 88-420-8014-4
- Gitta Sereny. In quelle tenebre. 1ª ed. 1994. Nuova ed. Adelphi, Milan 2005. ISBN 88-459-1044-X
- Antonio Spinosa. Pio XII. Un papa nelle tenebre. 1ª ed. 1992. Nuova ed. Mondadori 2004.

== T ==
- Ruggero Taradel. L’accusa del sangue. Storia politica di un mito antisemita. Editori Riuniti, Rome 2002. ISBN 88-359-5128-3
- Gordon Thomas. The Pope's Jews. New York: Thomas Dunne, 2012. ISBN 9780312604219.
- Harold Tittmann. Il Vaticano di Pio XII. Uno sguardo dall'interno. Corbaccio, Milan 2005. ISBN 88-7972-693-5
- Andrea Tornielli. Pio XII. Il Papa degli ebrei. Piemme, Casale Monferrato 2002, pp. 411, ISBN 88-384-4763-2
- Andrea Tornielli. Pio XII. Eugenio Pacelli. Un uomo sul trono di Pietro. Mondadori 2007, pp. 661,
- Andrea Tornielli e Matteo Luigi Napolitano. Pacelli, Roncalli e i battesimi della Shoah, Piemme, Casale Monferrato 2005, ISBN 88-384-1043-7

== V ==
- Guido Verucci. La chiesa nella società contemporanea. Laterza, Bari-Rome 1999. ISBN 88-420-3007-4

== W ==
- Garry Wills Papal Sin. Structures of Deceit [Peccato pontificio. Strutture d’inganno], Doubleday, New York 2000.

== Z ==
- Susan Zuccotti, Proprio sotto le sue finestre. Il Vaticano e l’olocausto in Italia, Mondadori, Milan 2002. ISBN 88-424-9810-6

== See also ==
- Bibliography of World War II
