= Lamp of Brotherhood =

Decorative oil lamp as a symbol of reconciliation

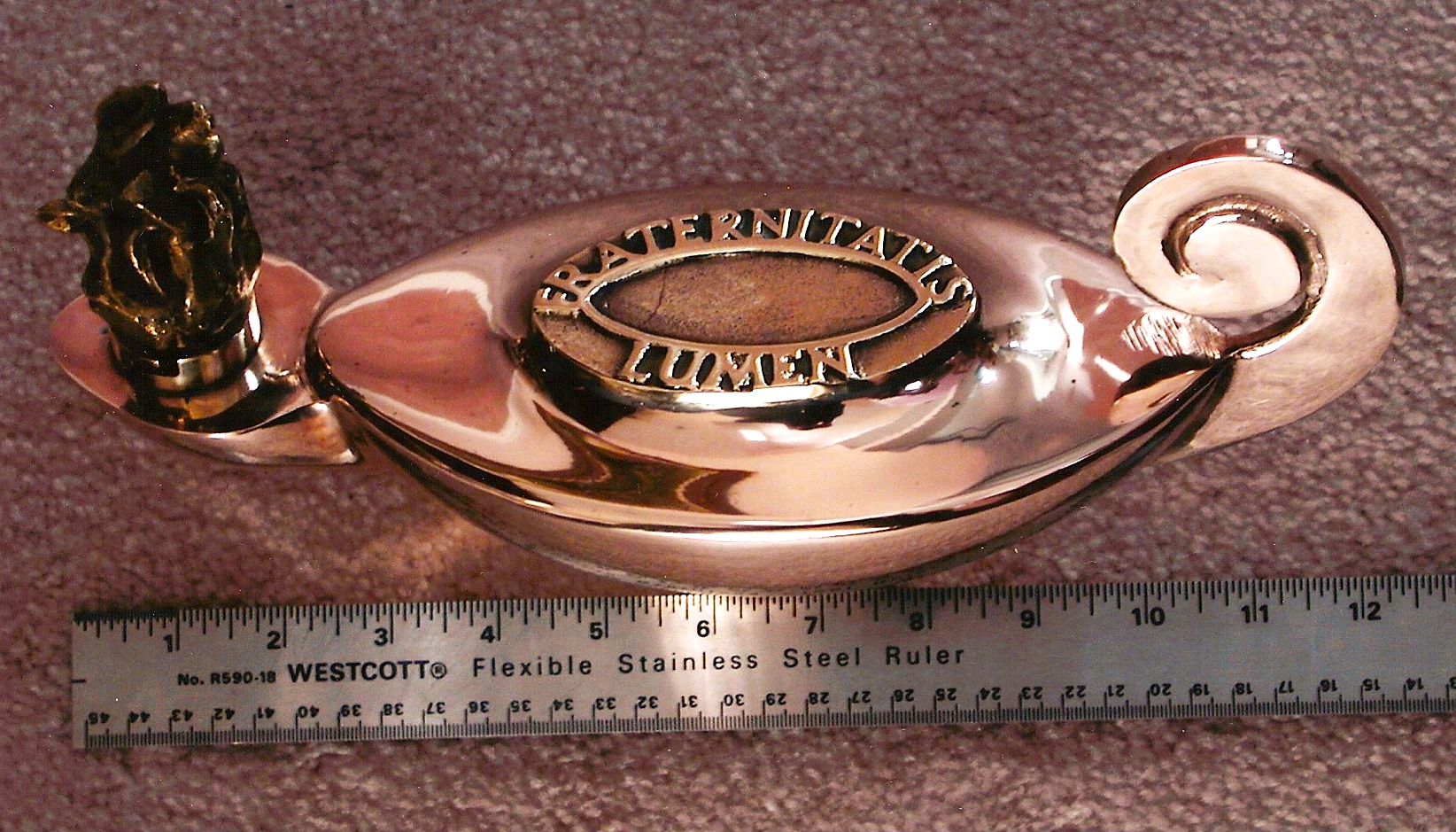
Lamp of Brotherhood in Vancouver

A Lamp of Brotherhood or Fraternitatis Lumen is one of 84 decorative oil lamps cast from the bronze doors of the destroyed Monte Cassino Abbey in Italy. The original Lamp was first lit in the Abbey in 1950.

The "Lamp of Brotherhood" presently in Vancouver, British Columbia, Canada, is 31 cm long, 10.5 cm wide, and 14.5 cm high. Text on the upper surface reads: "Fraternitatis Lumen".

== History ==
After World War II, Italian war widows began a movement to reconcile nations that had participated in the war, on both sides. In 1950, they organized a visit of families of those who had died in the war to several sites, including the Monte Cassino Abbey, where the original Lamp of Brotherhood was placed.

This initiative grew and by the late 1950s it had become the World Organization of the Lamp of Brotherhood (Opera Mondiale della Lampada della Fraternità), a subsidiary of the Pontificia Commissione di Assistenza led by Bishop Ferdinando Baldelli. A ceremony was held in the partially re-built Monte Cassino in 1956, in which Lamps were given to representatives of many nations. Each country that received a Lamp was intended to create a national Lampada organization, which was to have custody of the Lamp.

=== Vancouver Lamp ===
The Vancouver Lamp arrived in Vancouver through the participation of Air Vice Marshal Ken Guthrie in the original Lamp service in 1956. Guthrie said that he and his wife were the only representatives from North America at this Lamp-giving ceremony and it was placed in their custody.

No "Lampada" organization was started in North America, and so the Lamp remained in the custody of Ken and Kay Guthrie. The Lamp was a focal point at a ceremony in Sainte-Agathe, Quebec in 1959. A Mrs. Stockdale, National President of the Mothers of the Silver Cross Association laid the Lamp at the base of the Cenotaph. The Guthries brought the Lamp to Vancouver in 1964. There, the Lamp has been a focal point of the annual Battle of Britain ceremony at the Air Force Garden of Remembrance in Stanley Park.

== Known lamps ==
Italy – Monte Cassino Abbey
The original Lamp
Belgium (West Flanders) – Zuidschote monument
This monument to the victims of the first poison gas attack in World War I has a niche containing one of the Lamps of Brotherhood.
Canada – Vancouver
The Lamp is used in the annual Battle of Britain ceremony.
England – St Mary's Church, Banbury
A Lamp of Brotherhood from Monte Cassino was installed in 1964. It is cited as one of 84.
Netherlands – Christus Koning Church (Vredeskerk) at Venray
The church was designed as a peace memorial, where a Lamp of Brotherhood would burn as a symbol of peace. The church closed in 2000, and has been converted into an office building.
Netherlands – Margraten
In 1957 a Lamp was lighted at the American military cemetery in Margraten.
New Zealand – National War Memorial
The Lamp is mounted in the Hall of Memories of the War Memorial.

== See also ==
- Coventry Cross of Nails – Symbol of peace and reconciliation after the Second World War
