= Pope Pius XII foreign relations after World War II =

The Church policies after World War II of Pope Pius XII focused on material aid to war-torn Europe, the internationalization of the Roman Catholic Church, its persecution in Eastern Europe, China and Vietnam, and relations with the United States and the emerging European Union.

After 1946, Church policies, with wars ongoing in Korea, the Mandate of Palestine and other places, continued to propagate peace and aid the afflicted, especially in war-torn Europe. Pius XII began a process of worldwide reconstruction of war-damaged Catholic institutions. He promoted the internationalization of the Church with reforms of the Church, internationalizing the College of Cardinals in two consistories. For working women he repeatedly demanded equal pay for equal work.

== Church policies ==
After World War II, some 60,000,000 Catholics were under the influence of Communist regimes in Eastern Europe. Relations with the United States were cordial. Faced with a war in the Middle East, Pius called for mutual respect for and between the three major religions, Christianity, Judaism and Islam. He insisted on their free access to Holy Sites, especially in Jerusalem. In his war-time message, Pius had called for an international order and the establishment of international organizations. He therefore welcomed the creation of such organizations after the war, and appointed papal representatives or observers to them. Pacelli supported a unification of Europe. In 1957, following the signing of the Treaty of Rome, he received the heads of government and State of the newly founded European Union, to express his gratification and give his blessings.

== Papal charity: policies and practices ==
=== Displaced persons and prisoners of war ===
On 6 January 1946, the encyclical Quemadmodum issued an urgent call for charity. The Pope described the misery of millions of people in war-torn areas, and insisted that all persons must help. He was especially concerned with the millions of small children without families, food or shelter. As in the war years, the Pope offered material help. During the war, some 200,000 messages were sent via Vatican identifying displaced persons and prisoners to their respective families.

Pius was an outspoken advocate of clemency for those accused of war crimes, including Ernst von Weizsäcker, who was ambassador to the Vatican in the last two years of the war. The U.S. nuncio appealed to commute the sentences of several Germans convicted by the occupation authorities. The Vatican, opposed to the death penalty, asked for a blanket pardon for all those who had received death sentences after the ban on execution of war criminals was lifted in 1948. After the war, the Vatican continued its information services. Vatican Radio began a daily hour for prisoners and interned to South Africa, Belgian Congo, Kenya, North Africa, Australia, India, England and North America. The DPs created often special problems, because many thousands of them did not have any identification. Preliminary identity papers and food were distributed to long lines of persons, waiting for hours. Identity papers were issued throughout Italy by Vatican charity officials and Red Cross representatives. Forty years later, controversy arose as to whether some Nazi officials benefited from these Red Cross or Vatican papers, issued in the grand chaos of 1945–1947. Most certainly, neither the Red Cross nor the Vatican had the time or resources to check individual identity claims at the time. This situation was possibly exploited by the controversial Alois Hudal, who was later dismissed from his posts, the rat line, but by also many persons of other persuasions, who wanted to start a new life under a new name away from friends and family.

== Immigration rights ==
As millions of refugees without any home or place to go, wandered all over the Europe, Pius XII insisted that immigration is a natural right and duty. In 1946, he declared, that all people have a right to immigration, because the Creator himself demands access to material goods. In addition, compassion supports immigration rights. Conversely, no state which can support additional people, has a right to close its immigration doors without reason.

  - Natural law even more than mere compassion compels States to secure people a chance of immigration, because the Creator demands that the goods of this world should be at the service of all mankind. Therefore, no state whose territory is in a condition to feed more people, has the right to refuse admission to foreigners without good and acceptable reasons.

== Charitable works ==
=== Madre Pascalina ===
Pius dealt with the human tragedies by organizing a two-tier papal charity. Monsignore Ferdinando Baldelli, Carlo Egger and Otto Faller started on behalf of the pope the official Pontificia Commissione di Assistenza. Madre Pascalina Lehnert was asked by the Pope to direct his personal charity efforts, officially under Monsignore Montini, later Pope Paul VI. To assist the pope in the many calls for his help and charity, Pascalina organized and led the Magazino, a private papal charity office, which began with 40 helpers and continued until 1959. "It started from modest beginnings and became a gigantic charity". Lehnert organized truck caravans filled with medicine, clothing, shoes and food to prison camps and hospitals, provided first aid, food and shelter for bomb victims, fed the hungry population of Rome, answered emergency calls for aid to the Pope, sent care packages to France, Poland, Czechoslovakia, Germany, Austria and other countries. After the war, the calls for papal help continued in war-torn Europe: Madre Pascalina organized emergency aid to displaced persons, prisoners of war, victims of floods, and many victims of the war. Pascalina distributed also hundreds of religious items to needy priests. In later years, priests with very large parishes received small cars or motor bikes." The Pope was personally involved, constantly asking bishops from the United States, Argentina, Brazil, Switzerland, Canada, Mexico and other countries for help." Cardinals and bishops freely visited Madre Pascalina, who by now was nicknamed "Virgo Potens" (:Powerful Virgin").

The papal Commissione di Assistenza to the most needy populations of Europe delivered more than ninety thousand crates. They were shipped by rail from Vatican station to dozens of countries In 1946, the Pontiff invited 50,000 children to receive a full meal after which the Pope thanked the benefactors of the United Nations for their generosity.

As Bishop of Rome he increased papal soup kitchen rations from three million annually to forty million by 1947. At Christmas 1944, he personally gave gift packages to three thousand Roman children and delivered another four thousand to children on the Feast of Epiphany, two weeks later. By Christmas 1945, Pope Pius had forty thousand packages. The Swedish King Gustav V awarded Pope Pius XII with the "Prince Carl Medal", given annually to the person with the most outstanding record in charity in the world. Pope Pius responded in his Easter message to Communist leaders who attacked his policies:

The Church of Rome is subjected these days to public denunciations and the most unjust attacks. In vain, the Church multiplied its charities to this city, the centre of Christianity. In vain, the Church accepted, protected, and saved persons of all kinds, including its most ardent opponents. In vain she was upholding in times of tyrannic repression the rights and dignity of every person. In vain, she fed the population of Eternal Rome in times of need and massive hunger. The Church which helped, is now allegedly responsible for the impoverisation and proletarisation of the masses, which in times of need she assisted and continues to assist."

In his 1944 speech to the directors of the Pontifical Missionary Society, he stated:

The herald of the Gospel and messenger of Christ is an apostle. His office does not demand that he transplant European civilization and culture, and no other, to foreign soil, there to take root and propagate itself. His task in dealing with these peoples, who sometimes boast of a very old and highly developed culture of their own, is to teach and form them so that they are ready to accept willingly and in a practical manner the principles of Christian life and morality; principles, I might add, that fit into any culture, provided it be good and sound, and which give that culture greater force in safeguarding human dignity and in gaining human happiness.

== China ==
For centuries, access to the people of China was difficult for the Catholic Church, because it did not recognize the ancient local Confucian customs of honouring deceased family members. The Vatican regarded these as religious exercises which conflicted with Catholic dogma. As a result, the Church made little progress in China. Within months of his election, Pope Pius issued a dramatic change in policies. On 8 December 1939 the Sacred Congregation for the Propagation of the Faith issued at the request of Pius XII new instructions, by which Chinese customs were no longer considered superstitious but rather an honourable way of esteeming one's relatives, and therefore permitted by Catholics.

The government of China established diplomatic relations with the Vatican within a short interval. The papal degree changed the ecclesiastical situation in China in an almost revolutionary way. As the Church began to flourish, Pius established a local ecclesiastical hierarchy and received the Archbishop of Peking, Thomas Tien Ken-sin, SVD, into the College of Cardinals. The establishment of Mao Zedong's communist regime in 1949 put these early advances on hold and led to the persecution of thousands of clergy and faithful in China.

== Japan ==
Diplomatic relations with the Japanese government were established in 1942, during the war. Following the defeat of the Japanese Empire, these relations were broken, but were reestablished in 1952 as Japan regained its independence.

== Korea ==
In 1947 when Pope Pius XII sent the first apostolic delegate, Father Patrick James Byrne to Korea, shortly after the liberation of Korea from Japanese dominion. By sending a permanent delegate, the Holy See was one of the first countries to recognize Korea as an independent nation after the liberation from the Japanese colonization. Patrick James Byrne, American missionary of the Maryknoll's fathers, was consecrated Bishop in 1949, but when the Korean War broke out in 1950, he was kidnapped and died in prison.

In those years, the South Korean government sent a delegation to the Paris conference in 1948 to be recognized as the only government of the Korean peninsula. At that time the Holy See and the Apostolic Nuncio in Paris (then Angelo Roncalli, later Pope John XXIII) greatly helped the Korean delegation to obtain recognition from many delegations of Catholic countries.

== Africa and Asia ==
For more than a hundred years, the Church has been building up infrastructures for education and health services in large parts of their African and Asian missions, including basic health stations but also specialized hospitals and universities. WWII had been a disaster for Catholic missions, educational and health institutes in Asia and Africa. In Europe, the houses of various orders and congregations, which prepare candidates for work oversees, were emptying. Priests and lay brothers, teachers and nurses, were called home from oversees to participate in military duty. Missionaries with the "wrong" passport were interned or expelled from the countries they worked in. After Japan declared war, much of Asia including the Philippines and Indochina became battlefields. Catholic churches, hospitals and schools were destroyed or closed. Under Japanese occupation, many missionaries were living in concentration camps and were mistreated. After the war, Pius helped rebuild the institutional presence and accelerated the pace of turning over control to local authorities. His encyclicals, Evangelii praecones and Fidei donum, issued on 2 June 1951 and 21 April 1957, respectively, increased the local decision-making of Catholic missions and recognition of local culture, especially in Africa. Continuing the line of his predecessors, Pius supported the establishment of local administration and a reduction of colonial influence in Church affairs: In 1950, the hierarchy of Western Africa became independent, 1951 Southern Africa and 1953 in British Eastern Africa. Finland, Burma and French Africa became independent dioceses in 1955. They remained financially dependent, however, from Western resources.

== Latin America ==
Latin America had independent Catholic hierarchies in 1939, when Pius XII was elected as Pope. During the war years, the governments and faithful of Latin America had been helpful, with large shipments of food items and clothing for Vatican charity services such as the Commissione Di Assistenza. Pius XII negotiated with Brazil a visa program for "non-Aryan" Catholics, a program subject to stringent conditions until its premature termination. After the war, Pius devoted special attention to the subcontinent, addressing in each country virtually every major Church meeting over Vatican Radio in the years 1946–1958. Concerned about the continuing lack of clergy in Latin America, he formed in 1958 the foundation of the permanent Papal Commission for Latin America. Several orders, Dominicans, Jesuits and even the Trappists, made foundations there at the request of the Pope.

== Europe ==
After the war, Pius rejected the concept of "collective guilt". Pointing to the enormous crimes committed, he demanded punishment of the guilty and stiff penalties for persons guilty of war crimes or crimes against humanity. He supported the Nuremberg trials with documentation, and was repeatedly quoted in the proceedings against Nazi war criminals. One year after the German capitulation, in June 1946 he challenged the Allies to finally close the Nazi concentration camps, which they had kept running to accommodate POWs and DPs. Pius did not protest the expulsion of millions of Germans from their homes by Poland, Hungary, Romania, Czechoslovakia and the Soviet Union due to the diplomatic deadlock with those (then) Soviet-bloc nations. His material assistance from the Commissione Di Assistenza reached many. He did not support changes of borders. Throughout his pontificate, he refused to engage in border issues, such as the Polish-German border disputes.

== Italy ==
In July 1940, L'Osservatore Romano informed its readers:

During the War, the Roman-born Pontiff was very concerned with the question, how to save the eternal city from the fate of destruction. He decided to stay day and night in Rome as not to give an excuse for bombings in his absence. He also communicated with FDR and Churchill regarding a sparing for his city. As German troops withdrew from the South of Italy, he helped to negotiate an open city agreement, by which German military circumvented Rome and thus did not offer military targets there. After the Germans left, the Roman population flocked to St. Peter's square to thank the "Savior of Rome" One of them was Pietro Nenni, the socialist leader who first refused to kneel down, until his wife forced him to. Later, Pope Pius was named saviour of the city and of civilisation.

But due to the international climate, and the communist persecution of the Church in the East, relations between the Vatican and Communism soured. The 1948 were seen as a watershed for the future of Italy and Europe and became a fight between the Catholic Church and the Communist Party of Italy. In his Easter homily of 1948, Pius appealed to the Roman people:

"There is no room in our conscience for faint-heartedness, for comfort, for the indecisiveness of many who, in this crucial hour, believe they can serve two masters."

With 49% of the vote, the elections of 18 April 1948 went in favor of the anti-Communist Christian Democrats. On 15 July 1948, L'Osservatore Romano published a degree which excommunicated those who propagate "the materialistic and anti-Christian teachings of communism", which was widely interpreted as an excommunication of the Communist Party of Italy, which however, was not mentioned in the decree. The excommunication extended to any Italian Catholic who was a Communist candidate in the parliamentary elections. It specifically did not include persons, who distributed Communist books, papers or leaflets, although those actions were condemned as well. Azione Cattolica very actively supported the Christian Democratic Party. In 1949, the Holy Office issued the Decree against Communism, which excommunicated any Catholic who joined or collaborated with the Communist Party.

== A United Europe ==
In 1933, Pacelli met the president of "Pan-Europe" Count Coudenhove-Kalergi, giving his support to the idea of a European federation. He embraced the initiative of Winston Churchill for a "Congress of Europe" in 1948, and sent a papal delegate to the Hague meeting. The European Economic Community was founded in Rome in 1957, the last year of Pius XII's papacy. As Europe recovered, Pius had encouraged European unification attempts and the foundation of the EU. He addressed the heads of State and governments from Italy, France, Germany, and the Benelux countries at this historic occasion. On 13 June 1957 he demanded a united Europe, aware of its foundations, with common institutions, a common foreign policy, and a strong European parliament to control the institutions and the council of ministers.

== United States ==
President Harry Truman believed that permanent peace can only be achieved on a Christian basis, and informed the Pope, "Your Holiness, we are a Christian Nation, as the US Supreme Court decided more than half a century ago" and re-appointed Myron C. Taylor as a representative to the Holy See. Vatican relations with America were cordial and largely free of conflict. Joseph P. Kennedy, father of John F. Kennedy, attended the papal coronation as representative of President Franklin D. Roosevelt. William Henry O'Connell of Boston was the first Cardinal invited by the new Pope after his election. Cardinal George Mundelein of Chicago was his second guest. In 1936, then Cardinal Pacelli was the first Pope to ever visit the United States. He toured the nation with Bishop Francis Spellman, visiting twelve of sixteen ecclesiastical provinces and meeting with seventy-nine bishops. He gave a policy address at the National Press Club in Washington, D.C. He had meetings with President Roosevelt which ... led to a resumption of de facto diplomatic relations between the Vatican and the US, which had been in limbo since 1868.

Pius had left the initiative to the American president, realizing the complicated situation he faced in the American Congress, which had refused to approve a papal minister in 1868, thus de facto closing the doors for an American presence at the Vatican. He privately protested repeated American bombings of Rome. After the war, Pius supported the Truman and Dwight D. Eisenhower administrations to rebuild war-torn Europe and to defend freedom.

In a well-publicized appeal, he wrote to President Eisenhower to spare the lives of Julius and Ethel Rosenberg, sentenced to death because of alleged espionage for the Soviet Union.

Pius invited Americans, Europeans, Africans and Asians in the Italian-dominated Vatican Curia. He encouraged young Americans to enter Vatican service. To provide better training and international exposure of American theology students, he welcomed the establishment of a large seminary exclusively for Americans in Rome. It was opened and blessed by him in the presence of virtual all American bishops. He was close to Francis Spellman, a friend of Domenico Tardini. Spellman was the first American ever to work in the Secretariat. In 1931, Pacelli consecrated him to be the first American bishop in Saint Peter's Basilica. Spellman was elevated to the seat of New York immediately after the election of Pope Pius XII. Spellman, who accompanied a groups of American pilgrims to Rome in October 1958, was also the last American and one of the last foreign dignitaries to see Pope Pius before his death on 9 October 1958.

== Concordats and treaties of Pope Pius XII ==
After WWI, the Church was confronted with a variety of short-lived government styles, monarchies, military rule, fascism, communism, and left-wing and right-wing regimes as well as some democratic governments. To fulfill its mission under changing circumstances, the Vatican insisted on freedom of religion for Catholics. Already under Pope Benedict XV, but especially under Pope Pius XI, a record number of new concordats were concluded. To Pius XII, Church freedom was the ultimate priority:

"We turn to the leaders of people, in order for the Church to live in freedom. Concordats are legal instruments. Taking into consideration the best for the population and the State, they are intended to create the space, in which the Catholic Church and the Catholics of a given country can freely live their faith and develop it".

Pius concluded some thirty concordats and state treaties during his pontificate. Treaties were concluded with Brazil (1950), Canada (1951), France (1952), Great Britain (1953), the Netherlands (1957) and the United States of America (1957). New apostolic delegations were established in Indonesia (1947), Palestine and Jordan (1948), Dakar (1948), Pakistan (1950) and Thailand (1957). New nunciatures were established in Uruguay (1939), Lebanon (1947), the Philippines (1951), China (1946), Indonesia (1950), Egypt (1947), India (1948), Liberia (1951), Pakistan (1951), Japan (1952), Syria (1953), Iran (1953), and Ethiopia (1957). A personal representative of the president of the United States of America was accredited at the Vatican since December 1939. Representatives of the Vatican were sent to several United Nations Organizations, such as UNESCO and ILO.

== Quotations of Pope Pius XII ==
We know full well, that the bare text of international law does not impose on the conquerors the obligation to liberate the prisoners of war, before peace is made. But the spiritual and moral needs of the prisoners themselves and of their relatives, the sacred rights of marriage and family, speak a loader and stronger voice than all judicial texts, and demand that we bring the system of war prisoners and concentration camps to an end.

- It seems desirable to us, to secure a new domicile in oversees countries for many of these people, who in the latter years were exiled from their land, or who live in over-populated countries, in which neither agriculture nor industry can give sufficient livelihood even in normal times. And we are confident, that the states which still dispose of ample possibilities of existence, will not fail to open their frontiers for immigration, because this is a sublime form of Christian charity.
- The natural law even more than mere compassion compels he states to secure people a chance of immigration, because the creator demands that the goods of this world should be at the service of all mankind. Therefore, no state whose territory is in a condition to feed more people, has the right to refuse admission to foreigners without good and acceptable reasons.
- We have remarked on previous occasions, that women should receive equal pay for equal work and equal results.
- The Church is not afraid of the light of truth, not for its past, nor its present, nor for its future. The time will come, conditions and human emotions permitting, when unpublished documents about this terrible war will be made public. Then the foolishness of all accusations will become obvious in clear daylight. Their origin is not ignorance but contempt of the Church.

== Sources ==
- Acta Apostolica Sedis, Vatican City, 1946, 1949
- Discorsi E Radiomessaggi di sua Santita Pio XII, Vatican City 1939–1959
- Oskar Halecki, Pius XII: Eugenio Pacelli: Pope of peace. Farrar, Straus and Young. 1954
- Pope Pius XII, Easter Message 1948, Herder Korrespondenz, Orbis Catholicus, FreiburgiBr. 1947–1948
- Pascalina Lehnert, Ich durfte Ihm Dienen, Naumann, Würzburg, 1986
- Robert Leiber, "Pius XII." Stimmen der Zeit, November 1958. Repr. in Pius XII. Sagt, Frankfurt 1959
- Herbert Schambeck, Pius XII, Butzon & Becker, Kevelaer, 1986
- Smit, Jan Olav, Pope Pius XII, London & Dublin, Burns Oates & Washbourne, 1950
- The trial of Ethel and Julius Rosenberg, International Socialist Review Issue 29, May–June 2003, USA Today, 6/17/2003
