= Pave the Way Foundation =

Coordinates: 40.752363°N 73.51°W

Pave The Way Foundation
- Founder: Gary Krupp, Meredith Krupp
- Location: 395 Twin Lane South, Wantagh, New York 11793-1942
- Key people: Chairman Elliot M. Hershberg; President Gary L. Krupp; Secretary Meredith S. Krupp; Treasurer Harry M. Epstein
- Website: www.ptwf.org

The Pave the Way Foundation (also known as PTWF) is a non-sectarian organization that aims to identify and eliminate non-theological obstacles between religions. The organization is dedicated to achieving peace by addressing intolerance, furthering education, and practical relations between religions through cultural, technological, and intellectual exchanges. PTWF strives to eliminate the use of religion as a tool to justify conflict.

Through inter-religious projects and concrete gestures of goodwill, PTWF identifies and eliminates obstacles between people of faith. PTWF utilizes an earned level of trust in order to "pave the way" towards improving "interreligious" relations and encouraging "intrareligious" exchanges. PTWF tasks the faithful of all beliefs to recognize that the true danger to international peace is the extremist ideologies that exist within every faith.

== The Work ==
In September 2000, in recognition of donating over 20 years of consulting services and negotiating the acquisition of medical equipment resulting in millions of dollars in savings to Casa Sollievo della Sofferenza Hospital in San Giovanni Rotondo, Italy, Gary Krupp was made a Knight Commander of the Order of St. Gregory the Great by Pope John Paul II, only the seventh Jew to be so honored. Mr. Krupp also assisted the Hospital in 2006 by facilitating a sale of MRI equipment to the hospital by General Electric.

Receiving the honor from the Pope inspired Krupp, a developer of medical facilities from Long Beach, New York, to follow the example of his fellow Jewish Knight Commanders in dedicating himself to the work of reconciliation between the Catholic and Jewish religions, In 2002 he founded the Pave the Way Foundation.

The Foundation promotes the philosophy, "Embrace the Similarities - Savor the Differences", through cultural exchanges, talks, pilgrimages, and youth projects. PTWF has developed a Palestinian-Israeli Prosperity Plan that is designed to help provide meaningful jobs and thereby reduce one of the fundamental factors that contribute to hostilities and violence. In an effort to bring people closer together, it has coordinated the purchase of baby formula and diapers by Americans for impoverished families in the Holy Land, but the purchases are made by and for people of different faiths (e.g., Jewish Americans buying for Palestinians). Similarly, PTWF has provided blankets to Holocaust survivors in Jerusalem. PTWF also developed a manual of etiquette to help to train Israeli security personnel in response to Christian criticisms.

PTWF has commended Islamic clerics who condemn violence in the name of their religion, explaining that such statements are important "in bringing an end to the chain of violent events that now endanger every human being on the planet." PTWF also calls upon all world religions to speak out against violence and deaths perpetrated in the name of their religion and shun any persons who pervert the name of their religion to support violent and destructive goals.

The Foundation also works to foster a strong partnership between the Vatican and the State of Israel. Krupp has lobbied the Israeli government to address the concerns of the Vatican on matters including the legal status of Catholic entities in Israel, issue of visa for Church employees and access of pilgrims to major shrines.

PTWF has done considerable research on the papacy of Pius XII and has sought to deconstruct negative stereotypes such as "Hitler's Pope". In his Pius XII related work, Krupp has criticized historians who let down the general public by failing to do proper research. Krupp, while not a historian himself, has "sponsor[ed] a three-day symposium in Rome and publish[ed] four editions of a glossy, illustrated volume of evidence supporting his view that Pius XII spared no effort to save the lives of persecuted Jews."

It arranged the digitizing of the manuscripts of the Franciscan Custody of the Holy Land for permanent archiving and protection. It negotiated the acquisition of high tech medical equipment for Casa Sollievo Della Sofferenza the hospital of St. Padre Pio in Italy. It sponsored the exhibit "Pope John Paul II and the Jewish People - A Blessing to One Another" in New York City. It is also working to help bring peace to the Middle East promoting the Wasatia Forum.

Krupp and the Foundation have played a role in diplomatic/political mediation between the Vatican and the State of Israel. When Israeli representatives withdrew from negotiations between the Catholic Church and Israel over proposed legislation relating to the Fundamental Agreement of 1993, Krupp acted as lead mediator between the two sides. Pave the Way lobbied Israeli diplomats, Jewish philanthropic organizations, Jewish congress-members, and influential Jewish leaders to contact the Israeli Prime Minister's office and emphasize the importance of cementing the relationship between the Catholic Church and the Israeli state. The Israelis resumed negotiations.

Another instance where the Foundation's intervention in Church-Israeli State affairs was important was after the election of a new Greek Orthodox Patriarch of Jerusalem, Theophilus III. The newly elected Patriarch was unable to discharge his duties when the Israel Government delayed recognition, Pave the Way Foundation, acting "in the interest of inter-religious harmony and positive, improved relations," made representations to the Prime Minister of Israel and the King of Jordan, urging them to give the problem their attention. Theophilos III acknowledged the role of Krupp's intervention in helping move the Patriarchate's affairs forward.

Pave the Way is a not-for-profit, tax-exempt 501(c)3 organization. Pave the Way's 2012 Internal Revenue Service report states that Krupp and his wife were the organization's only two employees, with Gary Krupp earning $100,022, and his wife $36,667. Pave the Way is largely funded by twenty-two members of the Board of Directors and contributions for special projects. During 2013, income amounted to $589,787. Direct project expenses were the second-highest expenditure after the wages paid to the Krupp's. Pave the Way Foundation has active volunteers who identify specific needs projects in 15 countries."

== Vatican Loan of the Maimonides Manuscripts ==
As a result of Gary Krupp's unique position as a Jewish man invested in both Catholic and Anglican Orders of Chivalry, he has been able to arrange for the mutual exchange of and access to, priceless historical artifacts and ancient documents of incalculable religious, theological, and societal significance. This ongoing project began as an effort to open the Vatican Library for the study of the previously unavailable writings of the 12th century Rabbi, philosopher, and physician Moses Maimonides. Revered by the Jewish, Christian, and Muslim religions, the writings and message of reconciliation by Maimonides, born of understanding the similarities of the three faiths, highlight the convergence of these faiths. The project has hence expanded to include much more. Phase one of the "Maimonides Project" came to fruition in September 2002. Pave the Way Foundation requested and was granted permission to bring Jewish scholars to view the original manuscripts of Maimonides at the Vatican Library. The Library was specially opened for this occasion by Fr. Raffaele Farina SBD, Prefect of the Library, and H.Em. Jorge Cardinal Mejia, Vatican Librarian and Archivist.

Pave the Way initiated the Vatican loan of Maimonides’ works, along with other rare Hebrew manuscripts, for exhibit in Jerusalem, at the Israel Museum's 40th anniversary, September 27, 2005. This historic commemoration was the first time in history that these manuscripts were on Israeli soil, and provided a rare opportunity for the scholarly study of these materials. As a public venue, the exhibition greatly increased the exposure, to a modern audience, of the ancient philosophy of reconciliation and tolerance between religions put forth by this widely revered luminary.

== Mission of Gratitude to the Vatican to Meet Pope John Paul II ==
On January 18, 2005, 168 Jewish leaders, the largest Jewish audience in history, met with Pope John Paul II to thank the Pontiff for all he had done for the Jewish people. Three Rabbis blessed the Pope, Cantors sang, Gary Krupp delivered a message from the worldwide Jewish community and the Pope responded with a message for renewed peace among the religions of the world. It was later reported that the Pope himself considered this audience to be one of the most important events in Judeo-Catholic relations to occur during his Pontificate. This historic audience received vast media coverage. Another historical event sponsored by Pave the Way during the Mission of Gratitude was the first Cantorial Concert ever held in the Great Synagogue of Rome, which enabled Christian and Jewish participants to experience Ashkenazi Cantorial music together as a congregation.

== Acquisition of the Bodmer Papyrus ==
In 2006, Pave the Way was primarily responsible for the acquisition of the Bodmer Papyrus for the Vatican Library, which is one of the most important Christian manuscripts in existence today. The Foundation facilitated a private sale of the papyri of the Gospels of St. John and St. Luke from the Bibliotheca Bodmeriana in Cologny, Switzerland. PTWF then identified the donor, Mr. Frank Hanna III, who in turn donated them to the Vatican Library. Bodmer XIV and XV contain the oldest written version of the Gospels and the oldest written version of the Lord's Prayer. Bodmer Papyrus XIV & XV were written between 175 and 225 AD and were held as part of a private collection by the Bodmer Library since their discovery in 1952 at Pabau, Egypt. They were presented to Pope Benedict XVI on January 18, 2007.

== Covenants of Protection ==
PTWF has been working diligently to focus awareness of the world community on the existence of ancient Covenants of Protection. "This is a message signed with the handprint of the founder of Islam, the Prophet Muhammad ibn Abdullah in 628 CE, as a covenant to those who adopt Christianity, near and far, we are with them. No one of the nation (Muslims) is to disobey the covenant till the Last Day (end of the world)." The above quote is a partial translation of the document by Dr. Muqtedar Khan. The imprinted Covenant of Protection was written in 628 CE, as a guarantee of protection for the Christians of the Monastery of St. Catherine, at the base of Mount Sinai, which has remained safe under Muslim watch for 1,400 years. The breadth of the document in its entirety is stunning. It basically protects the right to property, freedom of religion, freedom of work, and security of a person. There are no strings attached, and nothing is expected in return for such security. The simple act of being a Christian guarantee this protection.

Collaborating with noted scholars of Islamic, Christian, and Jewish Studies, Pave the Way Foundation takes an active role in disseminating information, providing education and lectures to communities who might otherwise not have access to materials beyond their local resources.

== Halki Seminary ==
In 1971, the Turkish government closed the Halki seminary (Heybeliada), the oldest and most important religious education institution in the Christian Orthodox Church, creating a grave crisis.

This followed earlier Turkish Government decrees affecting the Patriarchate, including a requirement that the Patriarch must be a Turkish citizen and that the Turkish Government can veto the election of a new Patriarch. Previous Turkish Governments had objected to the Ecumenical Patriarch of Constantinople exercising his rights as the spiritual leader of more than 300 million Christian Orthodox faithful (the second-largest Christian denomination in the world), tried to restrict him to the leadership for only the tiny Orthodox community in Turkey and confiscated Church properties in Turkey. This was a reversal of several centuries of much greater tolerance. Although Turkey is an Islamic country, the government closed all Muslim schools as well in an effort to secularize the school system. As the only Christian Orthodox seminary in Turkey, Halki Seminary was closed as collateral damage.

May 2012, Pave the Way Foundation sent 5 letters to the Turkish government containing a Muslim request for Halki's reopening, together with its religious justification. The request was based on a covenant of protection for the "people of the book" (that is, Jews and Christians) guaranteed by the hand-printed signature of the Islamic prophet Muhammad in 628 AD. Muhammed, through his covenant, guarantees Islamic protection of the Christians and their churches from all of his followers until the end of time.

The letters were received by the prime minister, the president, the ambassadors to the United Nations, the United States, and the European Union in May 2012. On July 5, 2012, Professor Mehmet Gormez, the highest Muslim authority in Turkey, made an unprecedented historic visit to Greek Orthodox Patriarch Bartholomew I. On that day he embraced the Patriarch and called for the reopening of the Halki seminary in the name of Islam and stated:

"As the Religious Affairs Directorate, we see non-Muslim citizens living in Turkey as an integral part of this country. Regarding religious freedoms -- freedom of religion, freedom to receive an education, and the sacredness of places of worship -- we demand for them the same rights that we demand for ourselves. We think it is a fundamental right for people from every ethnicity and religion not only in our country but also in every part of the world to practice their religion freely, educate their children in accordance with their beliefs and raise their own theologians,"

== Praise for Pius XII Related Activities ==
Pave the Way's historical work regarding Pope Pius XII has been recognized for serving the common good by Archbishop Fernando Filoni, Substitute Vatican Secretary of State. One of Pave the Way Foundation's most important projects was helping the Vatican digitize and post its Actes et Documents collection of World War II documents on the Internet so that scholars from all over the world could review them. PTWF has also posted over 76,000 pages of primary documents, interview videos, and contemporary reports on its web page, making primary sources available at no cost to researchers from around the world. Many organizations, which have used this controversy for fundraising purposes have attacked PTWF for its attempt to make original material available for scholars to reach an educated conclusion.

In September 2008, PTWF sponsored an international conference on Pope Pius XII in Rome. Eighty participants, including Jewish and Christian clergy, historians, journalists, and authors – took part. Pope Benedict XVI addressed the group and paid tribute to "the tireless pastoral and humanitarian work of Pius XII, Pastor Angelicus." The New York Times reported that "several historians called to ask him to cancel his three-day conference in Rome, which ultimately drew many Vatican-friendly scholars but few with independent credentials".

One Catholic historian, Paul O’Shea, tried to warn Krupp that proponents of canonization might be trying to use him. He urged Mr. Krupp to wait for the Vatican to open its files, and for scholars to complete their work, before reaching conclusions.

Rabbi Eric Silver of Temple Beth David in Cheshire, Connecticut, who took part in the event, said: "We studied the documents in the Vatican’s archives and had eye-witness interviews, and what we learned was truly world-shaking. There is nobody who did more to rescue Jews than Pius." Later, many of the presentations and numerous documents were compiled in book format.

Among the scholars and researchers who have collaborated with Pave the Way are the late Sir Martin Gilbert, one of the leading Jewish historians of his generation; History Professor Édouard Husson, Vice Chancellor of the University of Paris – La Sorbonne; Israeli History Professor Limore Yagil, Tel Aviv University, advisor to the United States Holocaust Memorial Museum, Washington DC, Associate researcher in the University of Paris – La Sorbonne, author of several books on the Vatican efforts to save the Jews of France. Fr. Peter Gumpel, Professor emeritus of the Gregorian University (Rome) and relator in Pius XII's sainthood cause, Prof. Matteo Napolitano of Marconi University, Andrea Tornielli of Padua University, author of Francis Pope of a New World, Prof. Ronald J. Rychlak of the University of Mississippi and author of Hitler, the War, and the Pope, Ion Mihai Pacepa, former head of Romanian foreign intelligence and co-author of Disinformation: Former Spy Chief Reveals Secret Strategies for Undermining Freedom, Attacking Religion, and Promoting Terrorism, William Doino, a regular contributor to First Things and compiler of the massive bibliography of work on Pius XII in The Pius War: Responses to the Critics of Pius XII, the late Dan Kurzman, author of "Hitler's Secret Plot to Seize the Vatican and Kidnap Pope Pius," Michael Hesemann, German journalist and co-author with Georg Ratzinger Hesemann of "My brother, the Pope," and Sr. Margherita Marchione, PhD, former faculty member at Fairleigh Dickinson University and author of numerous books on Pope Pius XII. Dr. Frank P. Oliveri, founder of Courage Italia: Italian Resistance to the Holocaust Community Project and recipient of the Phi Delta Kappa Leadership Award in Holocaust Research. holds a PhD in history from Harvard University and La Sapienza University in Rome, wrote the following: "Having engaged in serious Holocaust research for the last 35 years, though my research has focused almost purely on individuals who sheltered, protected and in fact saved countless Jewish lives, after having reviewed Gary Krupp's compilation of documents in defense of Pope Pius XII, (Eugenio Pacelli), in two words, I have found his book astonishing and overwhelming. It is those very documents in Mr. Krupp's book that actually linked it all as it has never done before, by all historians and researchers put together, including this writer. Gary Krupp's work and passion have done more to bring Christians and Jews closer together, in an atmosphere of collaboration, greater understanding, and brotherhood than has ever happened during the long history of these two jealous sisters, Judaism and Christianity. It is now up to all of us to, more than ever before, recognize, pay tribute and honor more of those who in the face of evil, demonstrated Goodness, in the face of barbarism, demonstrated Humanity, and in the face of cowardice, demonstrated exceptional Courage.". Dr. Oliveri also stated, "That it is regrettable, the critics of the Pius XII documents project have resorted to personal attacks against Mr. Krupp, rather than register to actually come on to the site and examine the vast treasure trove of primary source information.

However the dearth of prominent Jewish scholars and historians let alone survivors at the conference was entirely predictable...The Vatican had not up until and including the time of the conference still did not permit unfettered access by independent scholars to its archives for the period encompassing the Holocaust years. References to dramatic new findings exonerating the Pope need to be understood in the context of Vatican officials essentially cherry-picking and spoon feeding this material. The scholar and best selling author David I. Kertzerer attended the Rome Conference and in several meticulously researched publications (e.g., The Pope at War: The Secret History of Pius XII, Mussolini, and Hitler) provides ample evidence of the Pope's over-arching interest in protecting Catholic institutions as opposed to curtailing the Jewish slaughter. En masse, even the relatively small Jewish population of Rome itself was not spared. They were rounded up and taken off to be exterminated during Pius XII's reign. After the war the Pope was rightly criticized for his paucity of attention to/comment upon the grave moral crisis during which 2/3 of European Jewry was exterminated while the world (and he) silently looked-on or away. The issue at hand is not whether the Pope had a good heart or even a best friend during childhood who was Jewish (RE: the latter he apparently did according to testimony provided at the conference) but rather whether he behaved as a truly righteous soul in his position ought to have.

Pope Benedict XVI has offered his thanks "to the Pave the Way Foundation for its ongoing activity in promoting relationships and dialogue between religions, as witnesses of peace, charity, and reconciliation." Rabbi Carlos C. Huerta, Chaplain (Major) United States Military Academy at West Point said of PTWF: "without organizations like yours our world would be far worse than it is and religious intolerance would be so rampant. I only pray that G-d gives you the strength to continue this important work." H.E. Ambassador Alon Pinkas, former Consul General to New York for the State of Israel, has called Gary Krupp "a committed individual with a kind heart [who] has utilized his unique position within the Catholic Church and commitment to his own heritage, Judaism, as a springboard for dialogue between the two faiths." Ambassador Oded Ben-Hur-Israeli Ambassador to the Holy See Rome called Krupp "a soldier of peace."

== Criticism of Pius XII Related Activities ==
Although the methodology of Pave the Way Foundation relating to the historical record of Pope Pius XII has been subject to harsh criticism from scholars and long-established Jewish organizations, the foundation is merely assembling primary source documents, eyewitness interviews, and published works on its website for scholarly study. To date over 76,000 pages of documentation have been posted on its website. Professor Dwork, Rose Professor of Holocaust History and Director of the Strassler Center for Holocaust and Genocide Studies at Clark University, said Mr. Krupp's research was "amateurish, worse than amateurish — risible." and that "He may be well-meaning, but his lack of experience in international affairs and historical research makes Mr. Krupp highly vulnerable to being manipulated by factions inside the Vatican. John T. Pawlikowski, a Catholic priest and founding member of the board of the United States Holocaust Memorial Museum, and Professor Emeritus of Social Ethics at Catholic Theological Union in Chicago, said the Vatican was "discrediting itself by associating itself with this kind of questionable scholarship."

Eric Greenberg, Director of Interfaith Policy at the New York-based Anti-Defamation League asserted "Whether he [Gary Krupp] understands it or not, he is waging a campaign of misinformation...He's been given out-of-context documents and is coming to overblown conclusions about Pius XII's personal involvement and that is a disservice to historians and to the historical truth." Rabbi Joseph Potasnik of the New York Board of Rabbis, who was once a supporter, resigned from the board of directors of Pave the Way and commented "Many of us are very troubled by the stance Mr. Krupp has taken...Thus far there's only been a superficial examination (of Pius XII). Given the seriousness of the subject, we need to be much more deliberate and have as much historical factual information." Pave the Way's claims of finding new documents that exonerate Pius XII are disputed by John Pawlikowski, Professor of Ethics at Catholic Theological Union in Chicago, who argues that Krupp's evidence has already been studied by experts and that "We know that Pius did some things that were good, but they tended to come rather late, they were mostly behind the scenes and were relatively minor gestures." The Anti-Defamation League asked Holocaust historian Paul O'Shea to examine other material published by Pave the Way. The ADL concluded that "materials presented by Pave the Way Foundation are part of a campaign of misinformation by some Pius apologists who use selective church documents and issue unsubstantiated conclusions about Pius XII. O'Shea commented on the claims made by Pave the Way "To use the Campagna files to suggest that Pope Pius XII was active in attempting to rescue Jews is to demand something that historical record cannot sustain,"

In 2011, Pave the Way published claims that a new document they had recently uncovered showed that Pius XII had been pressured by the allies not to make a radio broadcast that would save the lives of Hungarian Jews. Eric J. Greenberg points out that, contrary to the claims made by Pave the Way, "the 1944 cable is an old, well-known document, and by itself does not make the case for Pope Pius" and that "You can’t distribute or release an out-of-context letter or document and make a global claim for it. This is an example of Pave the Way’s campaign of misinformation that makes a disservice to Catholic and Jewish scholars". O'Shea, of the Australian Institute of Holocaust and Genocide Studies, also asserts that "Pave the Way" are masters at creating a media flurry. "They are not trained historians. They believe that by creating a deluge of paper with information that is favorable to their perception of Pius XII, they can create a new reality about the wartime pope.".

== Awards Accepted by Gary Krupp on Behalf of Pave the Way Foundation ==
● Jerusalem Medal from the Franciscan Custody of the Holy Land

● Al Aqsa Fatwa awarded by the Grand Mufti of Jerusalem

● Order of Knighthood from the Anglican Church-St John of Jerusalem

● Medal from the Greek Orthodox Patriarch of Jerusalem

● Tree of Life Award awarded by the Jewish National Fund

● Special Star of David made by Palestinians in Bethlehem

● Servitor Pacis Award (Servant of Peace) Awarded by the Holy See Mission at the United Nations

● Old Friends New Friends sculpture presented in gratitude for help with a concert in Venice in support of the Hospital of St. Padre Pio

● Order of Knighthood awarded by Pope John Paul II

● Medal of Peace presented to Gary Krupp by Pope John Paul II January 18, 2005

● Rosaries presented by Pope John Paul II and Pope Benedict XVI

● Order of Knighthood by Pope Benedict XVI

● Humanitarian Award presented by The New Seminary, United Nations

● Nostra Aetate Award, Sacred Heart University Center for Christian–Jewish Understanding

● Bronze Statues of Padre Pio given by the Hospital of St. Padre Pio

● Cross presented by the Macedonian Orthodox Church

● Original relic of St. Pio di Pietrelcino given by the Hospital of St. Padre Pio

● Given to Pave the Way Foundation by artist Yulia Gould

● King Solomon Award from Inside the Vatican Magazine

● Bronze and Silver Benemerenti Medals of Good works from the Sacred Military Constantinian Order of St George

● Premier International Giuseppe Sciacca Award 2010

● Elected Top Ten in the World for 2010 by Inside the Vatican Magazine

● Special letter of appreciation and a "Class One" relic awarded to PTWF by the Postulator General, Marc Lindijer

● Certificate of Gratitude for the protective equipment donated by PTWF to the Bazellet Brigade stationed at the Gaza Border

● Knight of the Grand Cross and Dame of the Grand Cross of the Pontifical Equestrian Order of Saint Gregory the Great
