= Thomas Baumer =

Swiss psychologist (born 1960)

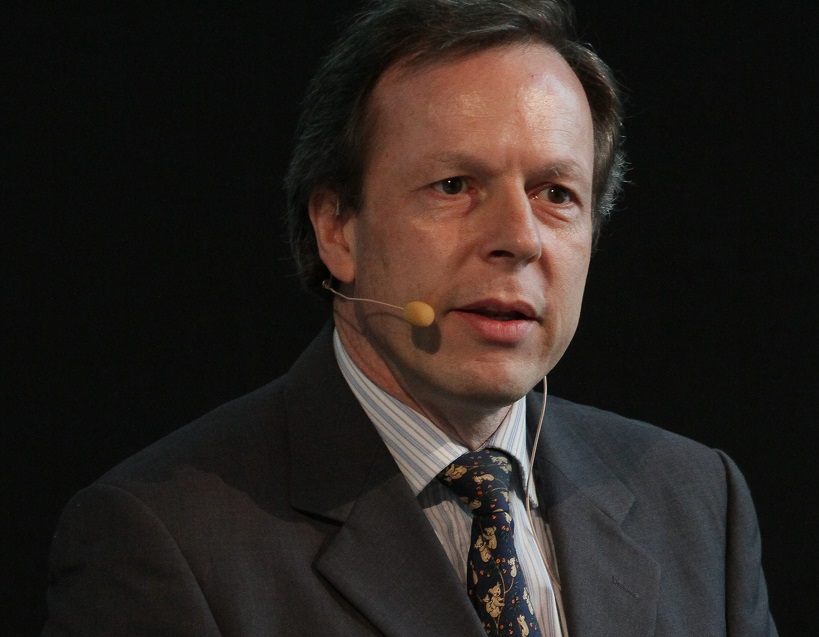
- Thomas Baumer in 2012
- Born: 1960 (age 65–66); Fribourg, Switzerland
- Education: Zurich University of Applied Sciences
- Occupations: Economist, Intercultural competence expert, Personality assessment expert
- Years active: 1986–present
- Organization(s): CICB Center of Intercultural Competence Ltd., CACB uCenter for Assessment and Coaching
- Known for: Development of parts of prognostic personality and abilities assessment

Thomas Baumer (born 1960 in Fribourg (Switzerland) is a Swiss economist and expert for Intercultural competence and Personality assessment. He developed parts of the prognostic personality and abilities assessment and coined this term especially within the German speaking countries.

== Personal life ==
Thomas Baumer attended the Jesuit school Stella Matutina in Feldkirch (Austria) and studied business economics at the Zurich University of Applied Sciences in Zurich (Switzerland).

He is married and the father of two children.

== Career ==
From 1986 to 1999, he worked at the former Swiss national airline Swissair, last as division manager and deputy general manager at the Swissair Training Center (recruiting of pilots and management members at Swissair and other companies, formation of pilots and flight attendants, human aspects development). He is the founder and chairman of the institute CICB Center of Intercultural Competence Ltd. which was founded in 2000 and, expanded with the department CACB uCenter for Assessment and Coaching, runs as an incorporated, multilingual company since 2010.

Baumer researches and holds courses, preparations for missions abroad and performed, so far, over 500 assessments and coachings (with or without focus on intercultural competence) in English, German, French and Spanish. He developed and coined essential areas of the prognostic personality and abilities assessment which allows, in extension to the findings with known personality assessment methods (e. g. Assessment center) and Potential analysis, a concise and verifiable conclusion not only concerning existing abilities and potentials (talents) of someone, but also concerning attainable goals, with the necessary frame conditions and the needed period of time.

== Bibliography ==
- Handbook Intercultural Competence (Handbuch Interkulturelle Kompetenz), Vol. 1; Orell Füssli Publishing, Zurich; 2002. ISBN 3-280-02691-1
- Handbook Intercultural Competence (Handbuch Interkulturelle Kompetenz), Vol. 2; Orell Füssli Publishing, Zurich; 2004. ISBN 3-280-05081-2
- Prognostic Assessment. Anticipate abilities and personal development (Prognostisches Assessment. Fähigkeiten und persönliche Entwicklung voraussehen); HRM Dossier; SPEKTRAmedia Publishing, Zürich; 2013. ISBN 978-3-908244-94-3
