= Pascalina Lehnert =

German Catholic religious sister

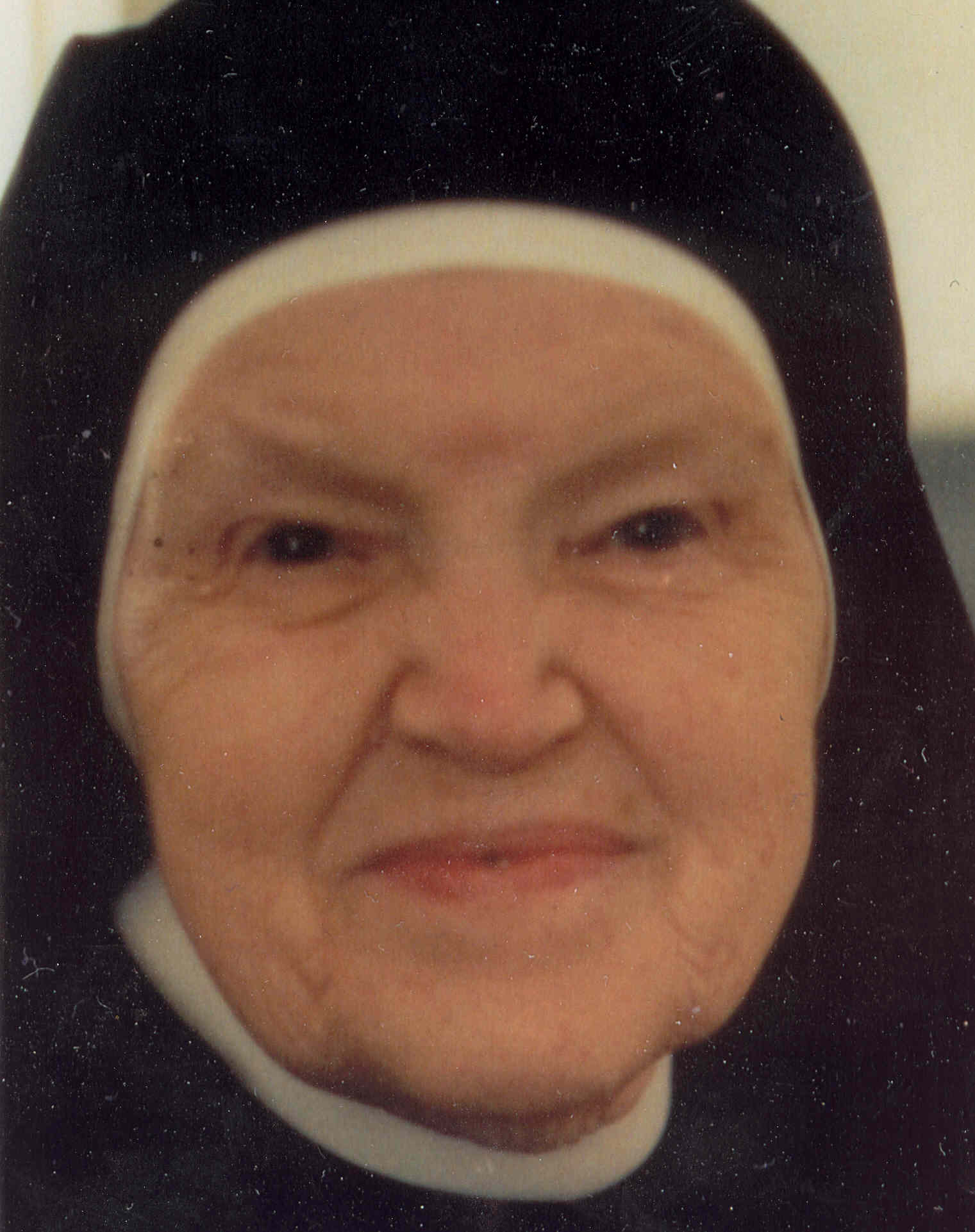
- Madre Pascalina in 1983 at age 88
- Born: Josefina Lehnert; 25 August 1894; Ebersberg, Kingdom of Bavaria, German Empire
- Died: 13 November 1983 (aged 89); Vienna, Austria
- Occupations: Religious sister Papal secretary and organizer Papal charity office manager

Pascalina Lehnert (25 August 1894 – 13 November 1983), born Josefina Lehnert, was a German religious sister who served as Pope Pius XII's housekeeper, confidant, and secretary from his period as Apostolic Nuncio to Bavaria in 1917 until his death as pope in 1958. She managed the papal charity office for Pius XII from 1944 until the pontiff's death in 1958. She was a Sister of the Holy Cross Menzingen.

== Early career ==
"Madre Pascalina", as she was called, led Eugenio Pacelli's household in the nunciature in Munich, Bavaria, from 1917 to 1925 and in the nunciature to Germany and Prussia in Berlin from 1925 to 1929, where Nuncio Pacelli was Dean of the Diplomatic Corps. There she became known for organizing the Pacelli parties, "which were auspicious, tastefully sprinkling glitter with the strictest European etiquette. [...] The nunciature was soon a major centre of Germany's social and official worlds. Streams of aristocrats, including President Paul von Hindenburg [(in office 1925–1934), who had served as one of Germany's Field Marshals during World War I], were frequent callers, blending with students and workers, anyone whom Pacelli, the shrewdest of diplomats, chose to smile upon."

Pacelli was recalled to Rome in 1929 to become Cardinal Secretary of State. Pascalina soon resided as housekeeper with two other sisters in the Vatican. During this time Pacelli's sister Elisabetta reportedly displayed some rivalry toward Madre Pascalina. She soon assumed responsibility for managing the domestic affairs of the Vatican residence, overseeing staff, visitors, and correspondence. Her administrative ability and discretion earned her considerable respect among clergy and diplomats alike. During this period, she coordinated charitable efforts and hospitality for numerous official functions, continuing the organizational style she had developed in the nunciature in Germany. Her influence extended to the coordination of daily schedules and the supervision of household operations within the Apostolic Palace, where she became a trusted and efficient steward of the papal household’s internal affairs.

== Papacy of Pius XII ==
=== Papal Charities ===
Pius XII responded to Madre Pascalina in the aftermath of the war by organizing a two-tier papal charity. Monsignor Ferdinando Baldelli, Carlo Egger and Otto Faller started, on behalf of the pope, the official Pontificia Commissione di Assistenza. Madre Pascalina was asked by the Pope to direct his personal charity efforts, officially under Monsignor Giovanni Battista Montini, later Pope Paul VI, with whom she seemed to have a complicated relationship. To assist the pope in the many calls for his help and charity, Pascalina organized and led the Magazzino, a private papal charity office which employed up to 40 helpers and continued until 1959. "It started from modest beginnings and became a gigantic charity."

By Christmas 1944, housing had been provided at the Papal Palace of Castel Gandolfo for 5,000 refugees from the invading Nazi forces. Inside the Vatican, Mother Pascalina was in charge of housing, clothing and food for as many Jewish refugees as the walls could hold. By the end of the war, no less than 200,000 Jews had been sheltered and fed inside the Holy City under her supervision. In addition to this, 12,000 packages were delivered to the children of Rome alone, many of which were handed out by Pope Pius XII himself.

== Later life ==
In recognition of her achievements, John XXIII awarded Mother Pascalina the papal honour Pro Ecclesia et Pontifice. This was the highest honour the Catholic Church could bestow on women until 1993.

=== Autobiography ===
Madre Pascalina wrote her autobiography in 1959. Church authorities permitted its publication only in 1982.

== Works ==
- Lehnert, Pascalina. Ich durfte Ihm Dienen, Erinnerungen an Papst Pius XII. Naumann, Würzburg, 1986
- Lehnert, Pascalina; Susan Johnson (transl.). His Humble Servant: Sister M. Pascalina Lehnert's Memoirs of Her Years of Service to Eugenio Pacelli, Pope Pius XII. Saint Augustine's Press, South Bend. February 2014. ISBN 978-1-58731-367-7. (first English translation)
