= St Mary's Church, Banbury =

St Mary's Church
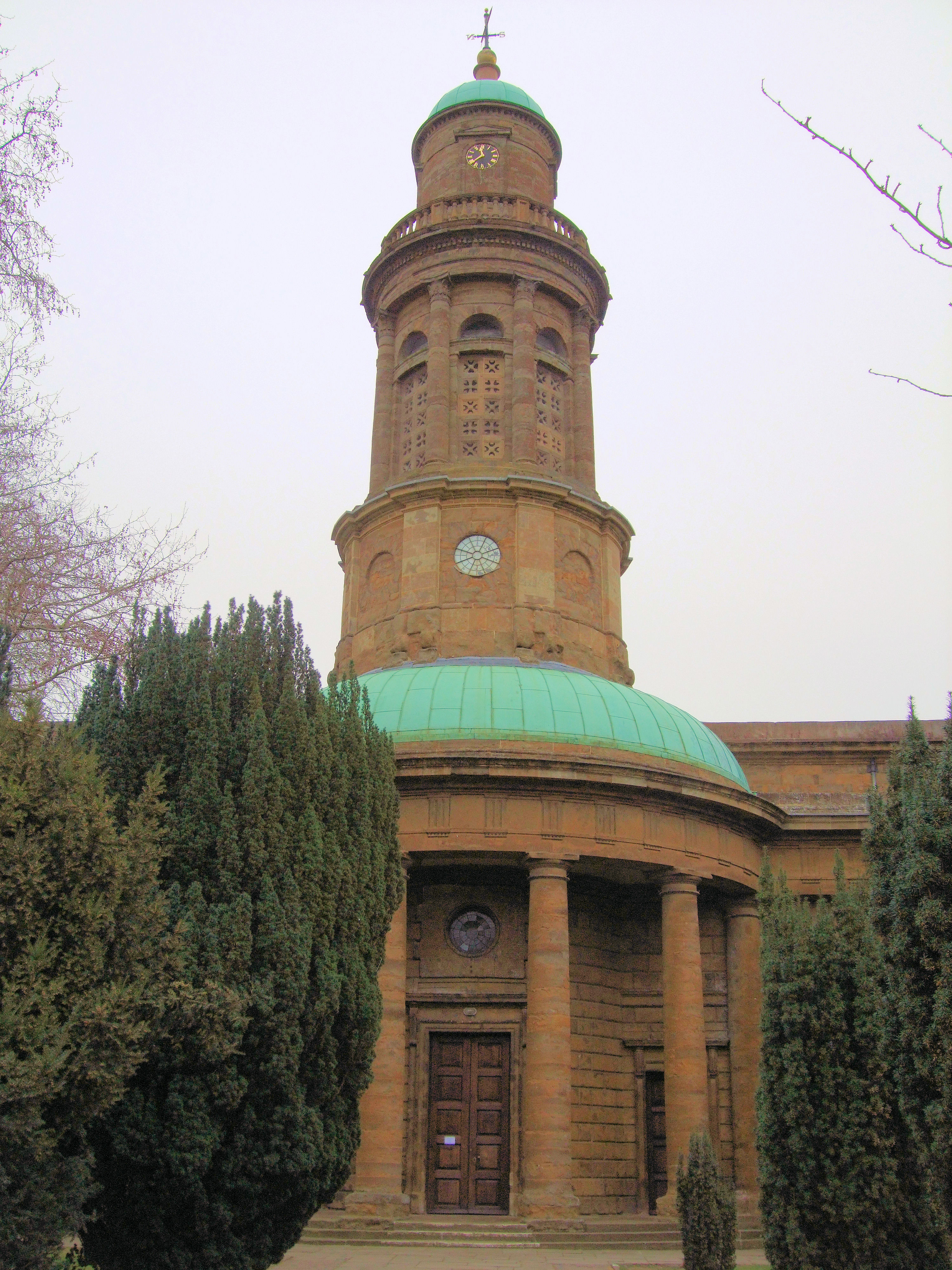
- St Mary's Church, seen from the west
- St Mary's Church
- 52.061483°N 1.339084°W
- OS grid reference: SP 45408 40551
- Country: England
- Denomination: Church of England
- Churchmanship: Central

History
- Status: Active

Architecture
- Functional status: Parish church
- Heritage designation: Grade I listed
- Architect(s): Samuel Pepys Cockerell; Charles Robert Cockerell

Administration
- Diocese: Diocese of Oxford
- Archdeaconry: Archdeaconry of Dorchester
- Parish: Banbury St. Mary

Clergy
- Vicar: The Revd Serena Tajima

St Mary's Church is a Church of England parish church in Banbury, Oxfordshire in the Diocese of Oxford. The church is a Grade I listed building.

== History ==
St Mary's Church was built in the 1790s to replace the Medieval one damaged during the English Civil War. The church was designed by Samuel Pepys Cockerell, with a tower and portico added by Charles Robert Cockerell in 1818 to 1822.

The inside of the church was re-ordered in the 1860s and 1870s by the then vicar Henry Back, an Anglo-Catholic, to make it more suitable for Eucharistic worship. He commissioned Arthur Blomfield to oversee the re-ordering and to decorate the church in a Byzantine style. It was during this time that stained-glass windows designed by Robert Turnill Bayne (1837–1915) were added, including one depicting The Parable of the Talents.

=== Present day ===
St Mary's Church stands in the central tradition of the Church of England. It is a member of Inclusive Church.

From 1993, the church was shared by the Church of England and the United Reformed Church; it was not, however, a Local Ecumenical Partnership. This agreement ended by the time of the 2019 vacancy.

The church's Resurrection Chapel is home to one of the 84 Lamps of Brotherhood that were made after World War II as a sign of reconciliation between nations.

== Notable clergy ==
- David Thomson, vicar from 1984 to 1994, later Bishop of Huntingdon
- Anthony Williams, vicar from 1931 to 1946, later Bishop of Bermuda

== Gallery ==
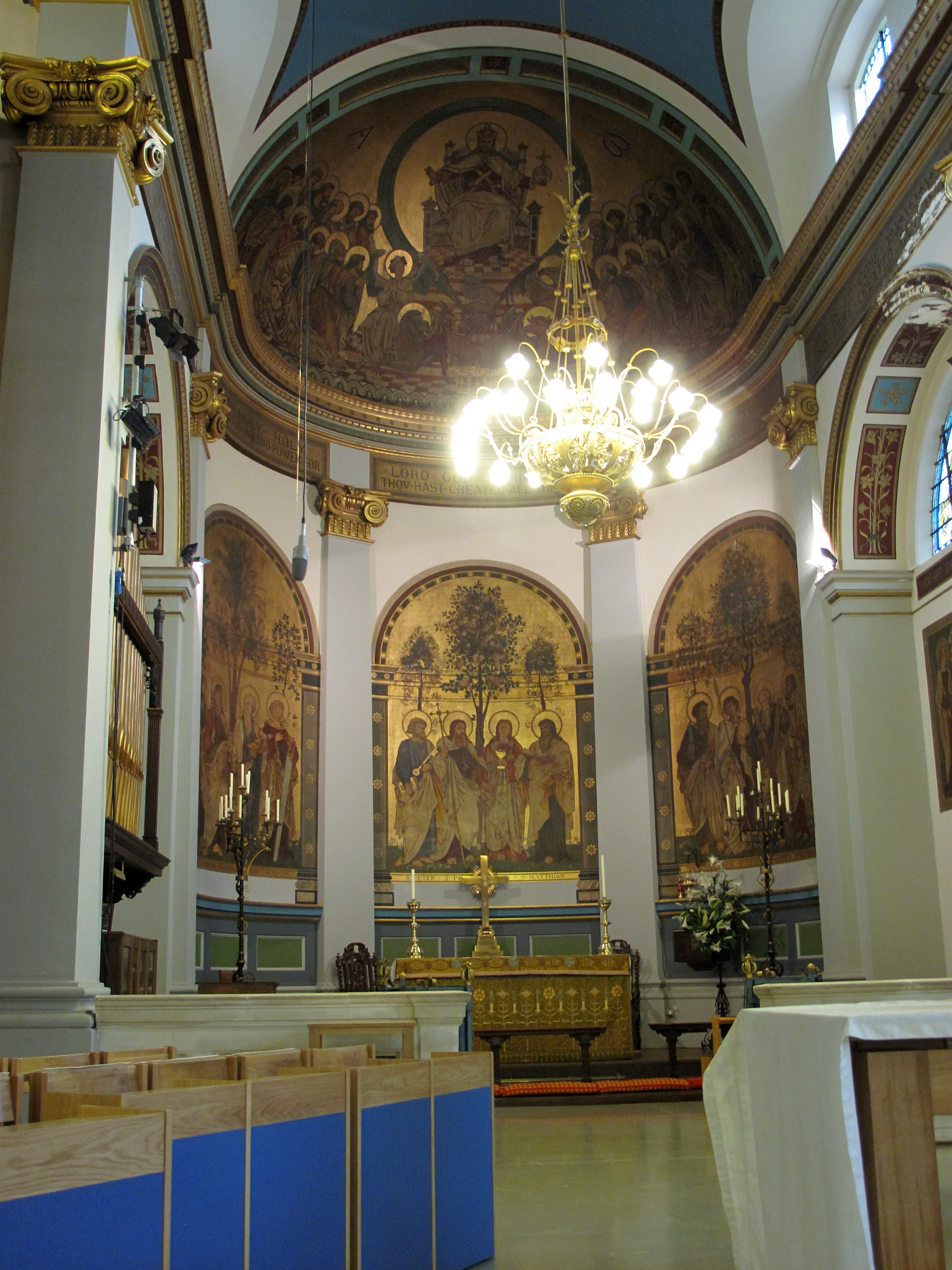
Chancel, with altar and wall paintings

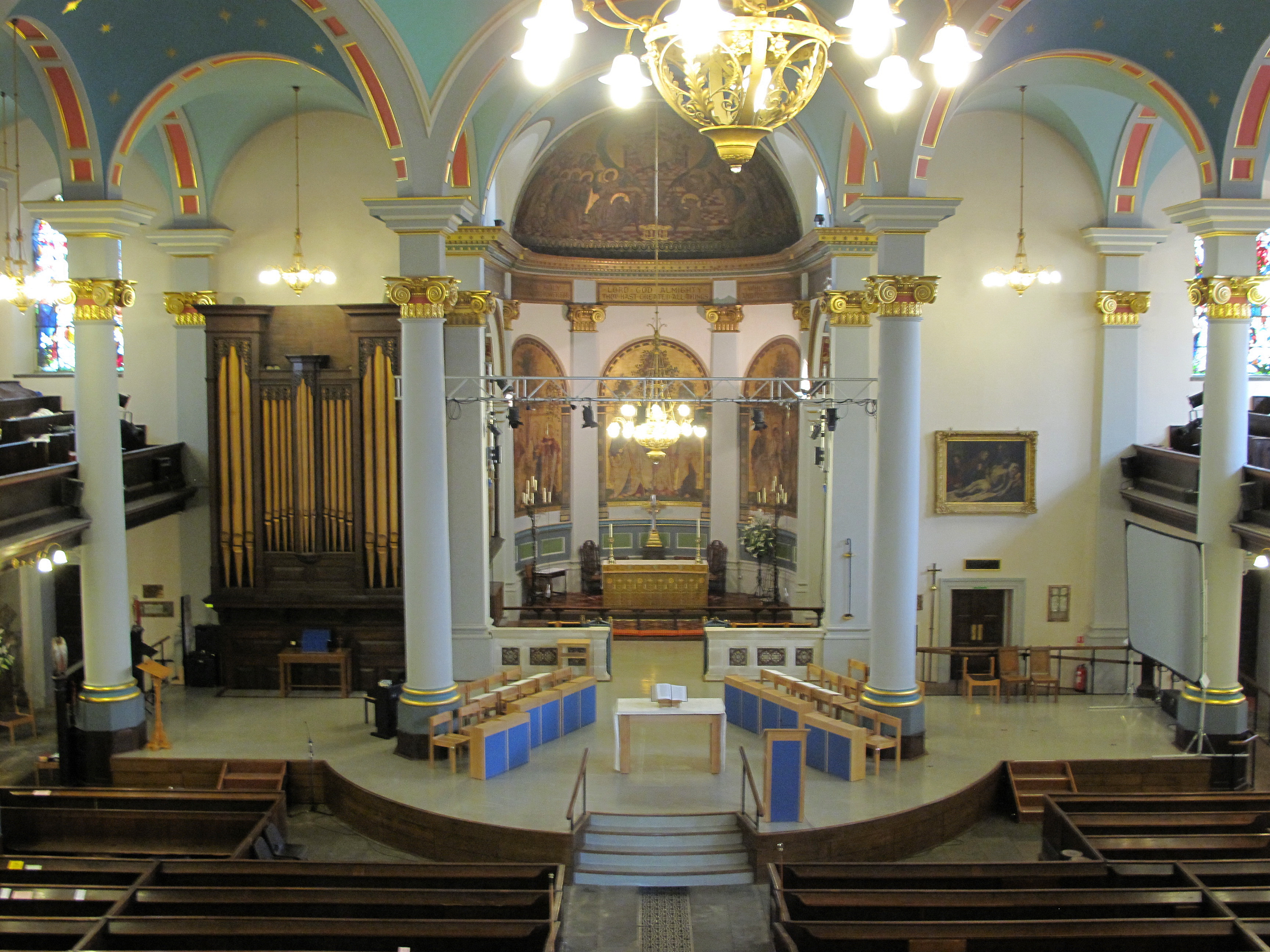
Down onto nave from balcony

== See also ==
- 18th-century Western domes
