= Franz Ehrle =

German Jesuit priest and cardinal (1845–1934)

His Eminence, Franz Ehrle, S.J.
- Cardinal Deacon of San Cesareo in Palatio
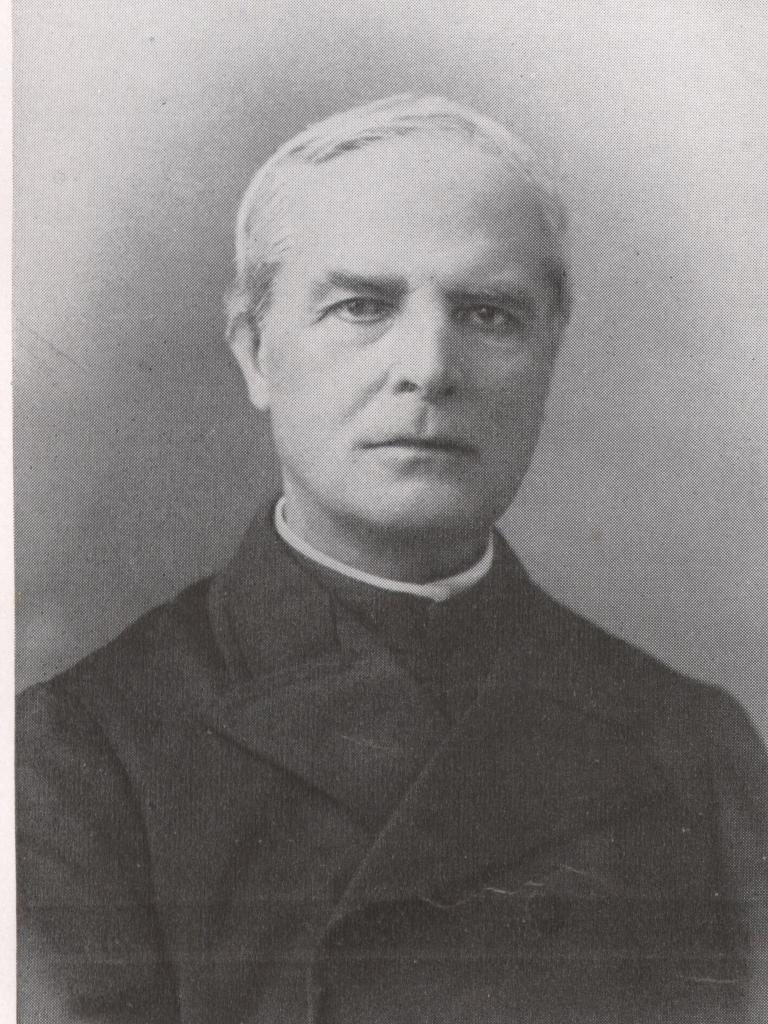
- Other post: Prefect of the Vatican Library (1895–1914)

Orders
- Ordination: 24 September 1876
- Created cardinal: 11 December 1922 by Pope Pius XI
- Rank: Cardinal Deacon

Personal details
- Born: October 17, 1845 Isny im Allgäu, Kingdom of Württemberg, German Confederation
- Died: March 31, 1934 (aged 88) Rome, Kingdom of Italy
- Buried: Campo Verano
- Parents: Franz Ehrle & Berta von Frölich
- Education: Maria Laach Abbey (1868); Ditton Hall, Liverpool, England (1877)

Coat of arms of Cardinal Ehrle

Franz Ehrle SJ (17 October 1845 – 31 March 1934) was a German Jesuit priest and a cardinal of the Catholic Church. He served as the Archivist of the Secret Archives of the Vatican, in the course of which he became a leading agent in the revival of Thomism in the teachings of the Catholic Church.

== Early years and formation ==
He was born in Isny im Allgäu in the Kingdom of Württemberg, the son of Franz Ehrle, a physician, and Berta von Frölich; he was educated at the Jesuit school Stella Matutina in Feldkirch. He joined the Society of Jesus on 20 September 1861. After completing the two years of his novitiate program of formation at Gorheim, Hohenzollern, he studied followed humanities at college in Münster, and later studied philosophy at the Jesuit Maria Laach Abbey (1865–1868). For the regency phase of his training in the Jesuit order from 1868-1873, Ehrle was sent to teach at his old secondary school, Stella Matutina, where he taught English, French and philosophy. Due to an anti-Jesuit policy that followed the publication of the Kulturkampf in Germany, Ehrle, along with other German companions, had to carry on his studies abroad; he studied theology at Ditton Hall, a Jesuit seminary in Liverpool, England (1873–1877).

After being ordained a priest on 24 September 1876 in Liverpool, Ehrle carried out pastoral work in a home for the poor at Preston, Lancashire, before being transferred in 1878 to Tervuren, Belgium, where the German Jesuit periodical Stimmen aus Maria-Laach (Voices from Maria Laach) had established its office in exile, to serve as its editor.

== Working in the Vatican Archives ==
When Pope Leo XIII opened the Vatican Secret Archives in 1880, Ehrle was called to Rome to do research on the official correspondence between the Holy See and Germany during the Thirty Years War. The work progressed very slowly as a large number of documents were as yet lacking detailed catalogs. Ehrle became more and more involved, but, responding to Pope Leo's call for a renewal in Thomistic studies, his interests shifted to gathering and cataloging books and manuscripts relating to scholasticism, and he visited other European libraries to do so. Publications began in 1885 with the Bibliotheca Theologiae et Philosophiae Scholasticae selectae (5 volumes). In the beginning of 1890 he began the publication of a Historia Bibliothecae Romanorum Pontificum, a comprehensive history of the papal libraries from both Avignon and Rome.

In September of that same year (1890), Ehrle was made a member extraordinary of the Board of Councilors of the Vatican Library, serving from 1890 to 1895, after which he served as its prefect until 1914.

In 1898 (30 September – 1 October), Ehrle organized an international conference on the preservation of manuscripts at the Swiss Abbey of St Gall. As a result of the conference, a committee was established:

- to study the processes of preservation that had been suggested and to recommend those which seem appropriate,
- to publish the processes of preservation discussed at the conference,
- to liaise with libraries and technical experts.

Ehrle published an account of the meeting and the proceedings were also published. This conference was particularly important as the first international meeting of those charged with the preservation of the historical heritage. Nothing similar took place again until the 1930s when the international museum committee of the League of Nations organized conservation conferences in Rome, Paris and Athens.

== Modernization of the Vatican Library ==
Under Ehrle's direction the printed books housed in the Appartamento Borgia were consolidated and moved to be stored with the main library collection. His measures of reorganization allowed for research scholars to finally have access to the public reference collection. Ehrle also worked to have reference librarians available to assist researchers. Extending the library's hours of operation to meet the needs of researchers, he opened to them use of the entire catalog, and eased restrictions on scholars' use and research of Vatican library treasures. Ehrle's efforts to meet the needs of researchers led to increase use of the Vatican Library and in 1910 a reading room was created in space formerly occupied by the Vatican printworks. This change also improved readers' access to the stacks. Ehrle also began a descriptive cataloging project for the Vatican Library's collection that he projected would take 80 to 100 years to complete. Ehrle's forward thinking nature also led him to introduce the use of photography to preserve endangered manuscripts before other libraries began the practice. Such photographical techniques also permitted researchers increased access to information on manuscripts. Ehrle sought not only to provide for the protection and repair of Vatican manuscripts, but also to make available the facilities of Vatican workshops to aid in preserving endangered manuscripts from around the world.

Ehrle resided in Münich from 1918 to 1919. Returning then to Rome, he served as a faculty member of the Pontifical Biblical Institute until 1922 and of the Pontifical Gregorian University. He was promoted to the office of Cardinal Deacon by Pope Pius XI at the papal consistory of 11 December 1922, and given the titular church of San Cesareo in Palatio. He died on 31 March 1934 in Rome at the age of 88. For the last year of his life, he had been the oldest member of the College of Cardinals. He was buried in the Campo Verano.

Records
Preceded by Andreas Frühwirth	Oldest living Member of the Sacred College; 9 February 1933 – 31 March 1934	Succeeded by Pierre Andrieu
