= Stella Matutina (Jesuit school) =

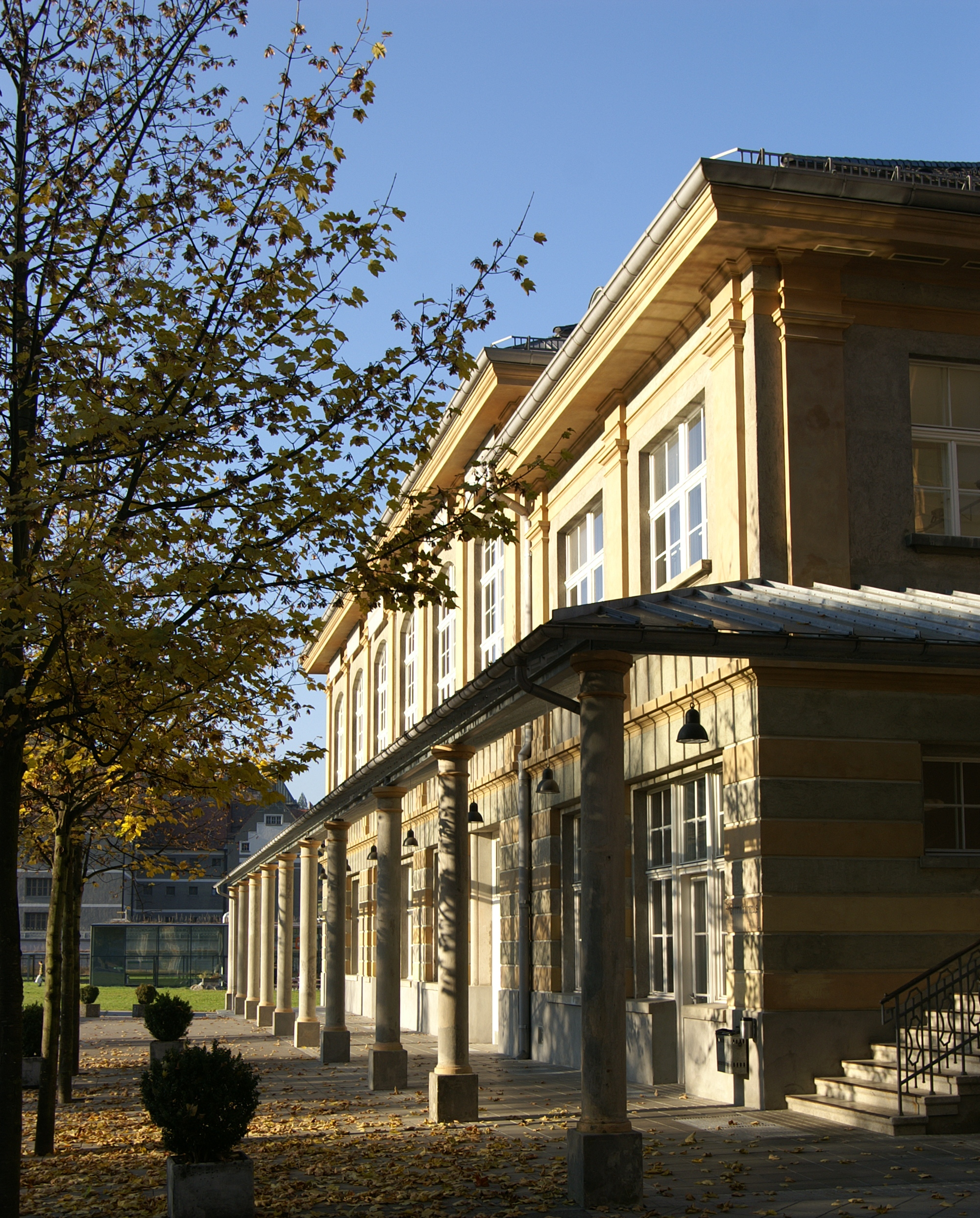
- Stella Matutina in Feldkirch
- Feldkirch, Austria

Information
- Established: 1651
- Closed: 1979
- Affiliation: Jesuit (Catholic)

Stella Matutina in Feldkirch, Austria, was a Jesuit school that operated in 1651–1773, 1856–1938, and 1946–1979.

== History, scholarship, international flair ==
The “Kolleg” began in 1649 but opened formally in 1651. In 1773, when Pope Clement XIV discontinued the order of the Society of Jesus, the school closed. It was reopened under Emperor Franz Joseph I of Austria in 1856 with the support of Pope Pius IX in Feldkirch by Fr. Clemens Faller, S.J. Students came from today's Austria, Hungary, Poland, Czech Republic, Italy, Croatia, and also Germany, France, England, Switzerland, and the United States. The highly-international teacher and student body flourished there until the outbreak of World War I. The conversational language was Latin.

The Stella Matutina scholars were well known at the time. Achille Ratti, later Pope Pius XI, and Ludwig von Pastor went to Feldkirch to conduct joint research with Jesuit professors of the Stella. The Jesuit professors were expected to publish in their respective fields and not a few of them taught at the Gregorian University before or after their time at the Stella. A 1931 volume of 26 publications shows a wide range of topics, from theology to law and natural sciences.

After the outbreak of World War I, the Stella lost much of its international flair and educated mainly students from German-speaking countries, including much of the Catholic aristocracy.

The religious spirit of Stella Matutina manifested itself in occupational choices after graduation. Over twenty of the graduates (1896–1938) entered the priesthood, in many cases the Jesuits. It operated until 1938, when the Nazis forced the closing of the school. With the help of French occupation forces, headed by a former student, Stella Matutina reopened in 1946 and continued until 1979. Today the building houses the Vorarlberger Landeskonservatorium, with over 400 students of music.

== Stilts game and soccer ==
According to Feldkirch authorities, in the late 19th century, English students introduced soccer to the Stella and thus to Austria. This is debatable. From 1856 on, sports at the Stella was dominated by the now defunct stilts game, "soccer on stilts". The stilts, usually made from wood, were relatively short. They reached "with a transverse grab handle up to the middle of the thigh ... where they were clasped with a firm grip." Arm and leg muscles were activated by running on stilts and particularly by striking the ball with them.

On the playground there was ... only a gang of savage boys who, a big stalk in each hand, fought like possessed for a leather ball. ... There were some real masters among us, at home on the stalks just as on their own legs. ... As far as I am concerned, I was soon able to overtake in a race a good foot runner, to take obstacles jumping, to hop on one stalk - the other one swinging - across the whole width of the yard.

Since the stilt "was played with fanaticism", there were dangerous wounds – broken legs, lost teeth, etc. – and there were always quarrels among the players, who had the habit of hitting each other with the stilts. Because of these violent consequences, the stilts game was forbidden at the Stella Matutina and the "entombment of the stilts did not take place without streams of tears." The students went on strike, and the Jesuits permitted the less violent soccer version to be played. Unlike today's soccer, the players were allowed to use hands and there was no referee.

Not only soccer was popular. The pride of the school was a larger-than-Olympic size indoor pool, which was completed in 1912, the only one in Austria-Hungary at the time. A delegation from the ministry in Vienna complained in 1912 that there is no other school in Austria with an indoor pool, not to mention such a large one. Ninety minutes were available in the afternoon on a daily basis for sports. The students had six large play grounds, which were converted for ice skating and hockey in winter.

== Famous faculty and alumni ==
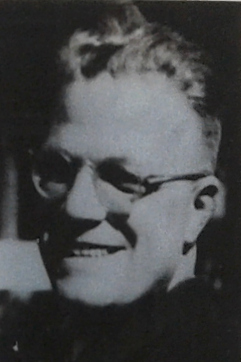
Alfred Delp, SJ

Stella Matutina had a series of well known professors and educators; including Joseph Hermann Mohr (Jesuit priest, hymn writer, and hymnologist); Franz Xavier Wernz (Provincial General of the Jesuit Order); Hans Urs von Balthasar (Swiss theologian); Cardinal Franz Ehrle (Professor and Rector of Innsbruck University); Hugo Rahner (Jesuit priest and historian); Erich Przywara (author); Otto Faller (papal advisor, scholar and superior); Johann Georg Hagen (Jesuit priest and astronomer); Niklaus Brantschen (Zen master, author, and founder of the Lassalle-Institute); Michael Czinkota (Professor of International Business Economics at Georgetown University in Washington, D.C.); Thomas Baumer (Swiss interculturalist and personality assessor); and Sir Arthur Conan Doyle (Scottish physician and writer). Other notables include Jesuit priests Alfred Delp, Alois Grimm, Augustin Rösch, and Oswald von Nell-Breuning.

Some professors and educators were previous students, such as Jesuit General Franz Xavier Wernz, Cardinal Franz Ehrle, and Professor Johann Baptist Singenberger. Other Stella Matutina students include Blessed Clemens August Cardinal von Galen; Kurt Schuschnigg (the last Chancellor of Austria before Hitler's take-over in 1938); and Heiner Geißler (German politician and federal minister).

== Literature ==
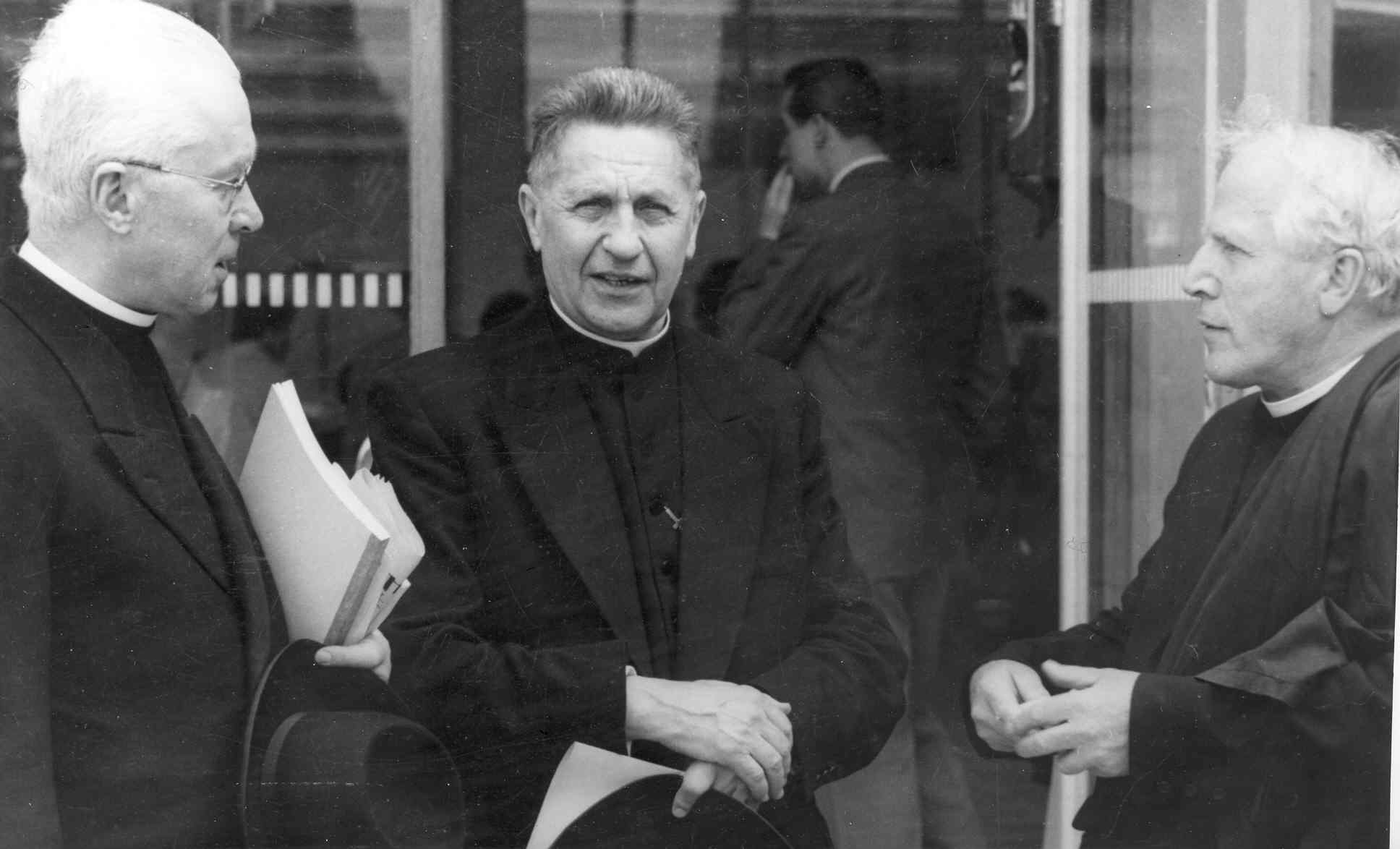
Director Otto Faller, left (1924–1934)), and Generalpräfekt Augustin Rösch, right (1929–1935) headed Stella Matutina

- Alex Blöchlinger SJ Die Bewegte Geschichte des Kollegs Stella Matutina von 1856–1938 und 1946–1979; Illustrierte Buchausgabe: Bucher Verlag, Hohenems 2006, 155 Seiten, ISBN 978-3-902525-52-9
- Otto Faller SJ 25 Jahre Kolleg St.Blasien, in: "Kollegbrief 1959" Kolleg St. Blasien (Hrsg), St. Blasien 1959, Seiten 20–25
- Albert Heitlinger SJ Über alte Jesuitenkollegien und ihre Pädagogik in: "Kollegbrief Weihnachten 1954" Kolleg St. Blasien (Hrsg), St. Blasien 1954
- Josef Knünz SJ 100 Jahre Stella Matutina 1856–1956 J.N.Teutsch, Bregenz 1956
- Alois Koch SJ, Play and Sport at the Jesuit College "Stella Matutina" in Feldkirch, Published in: W. Schwank (and others ed.): Begegnung. Schriftenreihe zur Geschichte der Beziehung zwischen Christentum und Sport, volume 4. Aachen 2003
- Josef Stiglmayr SJ Festschrift zur Feier des Fünfzigjährigen Pensionats U L F Stella Matutina in Feldkirch Feldkirch, Austria, 1906
- Stella Matutina (Hrsg.) 75 Jahre Stella Matutina Band 1–3; Selbstverlag, Feldkirch, Austria, 1931; Band I: Abhandlungen von Mitgliedern des Lehrkörpers; Band II: Abhandlungen von ehemaligen Zöglingen; Band III: Stellazeiten und Stellaleben, geschildert von Zöglingen mit 103 Bildtafeln
- Stella Matutina Jahresberichte, Stella Matutina Feldkirch, (annual reports)
- Anton Ludewig SJ Briefe und Akten zur Geschichte des Gymnasiums und des Kollegs der Gesellschaft Jesu in Feldkirch (1649–1773) in: Jahresberichten des Privatgymnasiums Stella Matutina (1908–1911)

== See also ==
- Stella Matutina College of Education in Chennai, India
- List of Jesuit sites
