= Margherita Marchione =

American Roman Catholic nun (1922–2021)

Sister Margherita Marchione (February 19, 1922 – May 20, 2021) was an American Roman Catholic sister, writer, teacher and apologeticist, who dedicated herself in her later years to the defense of Pope Pius XII.

== Early life ==
Marchione was born in February 1922 in Little Ferry, New Jersey, one of eight children of Crescenzo and Felicia Marchione, immigrants from Campania, Italy. She attended St. Mary's School in nearby Hackensack, and in 1935 she joined the Religious Teachers Filippini. She became a nun in 1938 at the age of 16.

Marchione received her B.A. from Georgian Court College, and her M.A. and Ph.D. from Columbia University, and eventually became a professor at Fairleigh Dickinson University, after earning a doctorate on philosophy at Columbia. She was the first nun to become a tenured professor at Fairleigh Dickinson University, where she taught Italian language and literature for nearly two decades.

== On Filippo Mazzei ==
Marchione's interest in Filippo Mazzei began in 1974 bicentennial. Filippo Mazzei (1730–1816) was an Italian physician, philosopher, diplomat, and author, who moved to Virginia, fought in the American Revolution, and became a lifelong personal friend of Thomas Jefferson.

The author of seven volumes on Mazzei, Marchione donated approximately 2,500 printed and published artifacts, works of art and decorative objects of Philip Mazzei to the Thomas Jefferson Foundation. Foundation librarian Jack Robertson stated, "The collection compiled by Sister Margherita includes not only facsimiles of all of Mazzei's correspondence, but relatively obscure publications on the role of Italians in American history." She launched an ultimately successful campaign to get the United States Postal Service (USPS) to designate a stamp to commemorate Mazzei in the form of a 40 cent airmail stamp in 1980 to commemorate Mazzei's 250th birthday.

== Pius XII ==
Sister Marchione claimed pressure from the international Jewish community is a major contributing factor to the Vatican's failure to beatify Pius XII. Throughout her life she launched numerous appeals to Yad Vashem to change its unflattering characterization of Pius XII and declare the wartime Pope a "Righteous Gentile".

Yad Vashem's Righteous Gentiles Department had informed Marchione that the museum would consider changing the negative presentation of Pius' role during the Holocaust if at least two Jews (or their descendants) were to come forward with proof they were saved from the Nazis due to Pius' personal intervention. Marchione claimed she has interviewed scores of elderly Italian Jews who expressed gratitude to the Pope for the fact that they were hidden in Vatican institutions during that period. After Pope Benedict XVI's first major meeting with Jewish leaders in 2005, Rabbi David Rosen, director of interreligious affairs for the American Jewish Committee, told the Catholic News Service that "there would be very many [people] within the Jewish world who would see the beatification of Pius XII as an act of intentional insensitivity".

Marchione has stated:

If Jewish leaders say today that Pius XII did nothing to save Jews, they are disputing the testimony of other Jews who said he did quite a lot ... It is terribly unfair to put so much blame on Pius, who had no army besides a few Swiss Guards with which to resist Hitler, while leaders like Franklin Roosevelt and Winston Churchill, who had the means to bomb the concentration camps, failed to do so.

In 2012, in light of better scholarship, Yad Vashem removed the negative evaluation of Pius XII. The memorial now highlights the pope's efforts to save Jews by secret rescue missions.

== Activism ==
In the mid-1990s, she learned that her own order, the Religious Teachers Filippini, had sheltered 114 Jews from 1943 to 1944 at their convent in Rome. She then wrote a book, Yours Is a Precious Witness, which was published in 1997 by the Paulist Press. The book included extensive interviews with Italian Jews who expressed gratitude for having been hidden by convents and monasteries during the Nazi occupation of Rome. She continued to write more books on the same theme, including Pope Pius XII, Architect for Peace (2000) and Consensus and Controversy, Defending Pope Pius XII (2002).

Marchione contended it is inconceivable that the heads of so many convents and monasteries would have sheltered Jews unless they were acting at the Pope's direction, citing a comment by Father David Maria Jaeger, an Israeli-born Jewish convert to Roman Catholicism and a prelate auditor of the Roman Rota, who argued: "Anyone who has any acquaintance with the law and culture of the Catholic Church at that time would understand [that] those things could not have taken place without specific orders of the Pope, and those orders could not have been in written form."

== Defenders ==
Marchione's defenders include:

- Dr. Eugene Fisher, associate director of the Secretariat for Ecumenical and Interreligious Affairs of the United States Conference of Catholic Bishops.
- Gary Krupp, president of the New York-based Pave the Way Foundation, said he believes Jewish groups should drop their opposition to the beatification of Pius to buttress a Jewish-Vatican alliance in the face of the rise of radical Islam. According to Krupp, "Margherita Marchione has done important research on Pius' efforts on behalf of the Jews during the Holocaust and is highly respected within the church for her accomplishments. More people should listen to what she is saying."

== Personal life ==
On August 19, 2011, it was revealed that the 90-year-old Marchione was treated surgically for intestinal cancer.

Marchione died in May 2021 at the age of 99.

== Honors ==
- In 1984 Marchione was honored by the National Italian American Foundation for Achievement in Literature.
- On September 29, 2004, Fairleigh Dickinson University conferred an honorary Doctor of Humane Letters on Sr. Margherita Marchione.
- Fulbright Scholar
- Columbia University Garibaldi Scholar
- Star of Solidarity of the Republic of Italy February 19, 1977
- Induction into the New Jersey Literary Hall of Fame
- Pro Ecclesia et Pontifice cross

== Works ==
- Twentieth Century Italian Poetry: A Bilingual Anthology (edited, 1974)
- Philip Mazzei: Jefferson's "Zealous Whig" (1975)
- Clemente Rebora: A Man's Quest for the Absolute (1979)
- Philip Mazzei: My Life and Wanderings (edited, 1980)
- Philip Mazzei: Selected Writings and Correspondence (edited in 3 Volumes, 1983)
- From the Land of the Etruscans: The Life of Lucy Filippini (1986)
- A Pictorial History of the Saint Lucy Filippini Chapel (1992)
- Philip Mazzei: World Citizen (1994)
- Americans of Italian Heritage (1995)
- Yours Is a Precious Witness: Memoirs of Jews and Catholics in Wartime Italy (1997)
- Pope Pius XII: Architect for Peace (2000)
- The Fighting Nun: My Story (2000)
- Consensus & Controversy: Defending Pope Pius XII (2002)
- Shepherd of Souls: A Pictorial Life of Pope Pius XII (2003)
- Crusade of Charity: Pius XII and POWs 1939-1945 (2006)
- Did Pope Pius XII Help the Jews? (2007),
- The Truth Will Set You Free: Commemorating the 50th Anniversary of the Death of Pope Pius XII (2009)
- The Religious Teachers Filippini in America: Centennial, 1910-2010 (2010)
