= Judith Cabaud =

Judith Cabaud (born 8 July 1941, New York City) is an American-born French writer and musicologist. She was born into a Jewish family of Polish and Russian heritage.

After studying science at New York University, she went to Paris and obtained her degree in French civilization in 1960 at the Sorbonne, and converted to Catholicism.

A musicologist and a professor of English, she is the author of several books on relations between Judaism and Christianity, the role of Pius XII during World War II, and the Grand Rabbi of Rome, Eugenio Zolli. She has also been a music critic at the Bayreuth Festival in Germany since 1994.

== Bibliography ==
- Where Time Becomes Space, Franciscan Herald Press, 1979
- Sur les balcons du ciel, Dominique Martin Morin, 1985 (preface of Raymond Leopold Bruckberger). Second edition in 1999
- Mathilde Wesendonck, ou, Le rêve d'Isolde, Actes Sud, 1990
- La Blessure de Jonathan P., L'Age d'Homme, 1998
- Eugenio Zolli : Prophète d'un monde nouveau, François-Xavier de Guibert, 2002 (translated into six languages)
- La Tradition hébraïque dans l'Eucharistie : Eugenio Zolli et la liturgie du sacrifice, François-Xavier de Guibert, 2006
- La Poule rebelle et autres contes du Gajun, François-Xavier de Guibert, 2007
- Postface de Histoire des Juifs, d'Abraham à nos jours par Bernard Antony, Godefroy de Bouillon, 2007
- Préface de Béni soit celui qui vient au nom du Seigneur : Du judaïsme hassidique au catholicisme, histoire d'une conversion par Elisabeth Smadja, François-Xavier de Guibert, 2007

== Translations ==
- Eugenio Zolli, Avant l'aube : Autobiographie spirituelle, François-Xavier de Guibert, 2002
- Roy H. Schoeman, Le Salut vient des Juifs : Le rôle du Judaïsme dans l'histoire du salut depuis Abraham jusqu'au Second, Francois-Xavier De Guibert, 2006
- Roy H. Schoeman, Le miel du rocher. Seize témoignages d'accomplissement de la foi d'Israël dans le Christ, Francois-Xavier De Guibert, 2008
