= Johan Ickx =

Johan Ickx (born 1962) is director of the historical archive of the Section for Relations with States of the Holy See's Secretariat of State. He has spent his career in several departments of the Roman Curia. He has published research on a wide variety of subjects related to the history of the Catholic Church from the Middle Ages to the 19th-20th centuries.

Johan Ickx studied religious sciences, theology and philosophy at the Catholic University of Leuven and earned his doctorate in church history at the Pontifical Gregorian University. He worked as academic assistant at the journal Archivum Historiae Pontificiae, as an official of the Congregation for the Doctrine of the Faith, and as archivist of the Tribunal of the Apostolic Penitentiary.

On 26 June 2008, while working at the Penitentiary, he was appointed to a five-year term as a consultor to the Congregation for the Causes of Saints. His appointment was renewed on 19 December 2013.

He is the author of a study of the Holy See's assessment of Germany's tactics in occupied Belgium during the First World War, La Guerre et le Vatican (2018). He argued that Eugenio Pacelli, the future Pope Pius XII who was then secretary of the Department of Extraordinary Ecclesiastical Affairs played a key role in bringing the Vatican to discount German propaganda and recognize Germany was trying "to terrorize the population" of Belgium.

In April 2018, he received the Romulus Prize (14de Romulusprijs) from the Rome Society of Leuven.

== Selected writings ==
Author

- Ickx, Johan (2020). Le Bureau. Les Juifs de Pie XII (in French). Melsele: Éditions VdH. ISBN 978-2-7499-3747-2. Translated as Ickx, Johan (2021). Pio XII e gli ebrei (in Italian). Milano: Rizzoli. ISBN 978-88-17-14952-5.
- Ickx, Johan (2018). Diplomazia segreta in Vaticano (1914-1915). Eugenio Pacelli e la resistenza alleata a Roma (in Italian). Siena: Cantagalli. Translated as Ickx, Johan (2018). La guerre et le Vatican. Les secrets de la diplomatie du Saint-Siège (1914-1915) (in French). Paris: Éditions du Cerf.
- Ickx, Johan (2018). "L'Ostpolitik di Pio XII. Il "modus vivendi" proposto a Mosca 1946-1947. Il caso di padre Alessandro Töhötöm Nagy S.J.". In Hrabovec, Emilia; Brugnotto, Giuliano; Jurčaga, Peter (eds.). Chiesa del silenzio e diplomazia pontificia 1945-1965 / Umlčaná Cirkev a pápežská diplomacia 1945-1965 (in Italian). Vatican City: Libreria Editrice Vaticana. pp. 155–179.
- Ickx, Johan (2018). "Nem, nem, soha! – Io non faccio della politica... La partenza del nunzio apostolico mons. Lorenzo Schioppa da Budapest". In Gottsmann, Andreas; Piatti, Pierantonio; Rehberg, Andreas E. (eds.). Incorrupta monumenta Ecclesiam defendunt. Studi offerti a mons. Sergio Pagano, prefetto dell'Archivio Segreto Vaticano (in Italian). Vatican City: Vatican Secret Archive. pp. 291–310.
- Ickx, Johan (2018). "The Holy See and Refugees (1933-1945)". In Katz, Steven T.; Wetzel, Juliane (eds.). Refugee Policies from 1933 until Today: Challenges and Responsibilities. Berlin: Metropol - International Holocaust Remembrance Alliance. pp. 63–95.
- Ickx, Johan (2011). "Campo Santo Teutonico und Santa Maria dell'Anima als Drehscheiben der Geheimdiplomatie im Umfeld der Papstwahl von 1903". In Buhlmann, Nicolaus U.; Styra, Peter (eds.). Signum in bonum. Festschrift für Wilhelm Imkamp zum 60. Geburtstag. Regensburg: Verlag Friedrich Pustet. pp. 347–373.
- Ickx, Johan (2005). La Santa Sede tra Lamennais e san Tommaso d'Aquino. La condanna di Gerard Casimir Ubaghs e della dottrina dell'Università Cattolica di Lovanio (1834-1870) (in Italian). Vatican City: Vatican Secret Archive.
- Ickx, Johan (2007). "n.a.". In Gevers, Lieve; Bank, Jan (eds.). Religion under Siege: The Roman Catholic Church in Occupied Europe (1939-1950). Vol. I. Louvain: Peeters.

Editor

- Ickx, Johan; Sodi, Manlio, eds. (2009). La Penitenzieria apostolica e il sacramento della penitenza. Percorsi storici-giuridici-teologici e prospettive pastorali (in Italian). Libreria Editrice Vaticana.
