= Anthony Rhodes =

British writer

Anthony Rhodes (September 24, 1916 – August 23, 2004) was a British writer of memoirs, novels, travelogues, reviews and histories.

Rhodes was born in Plymouth, England, and was the eldest of three sons of Dorothy and Colonel George Rhodes CBE. His early years were later spent at Lucknow and Delhi in India where his father served in the British Army. He was educated at Rugby School and the Royal Military College. Though his main interest was English literature he studied mechanical sciences at Trinity College, Cambridge, where he obtained his degree in 1939.

Rhodes served in the British Army during World War II and was involved with retreat of the British Army from Dunkirk. He wrote of his war time experiences in the 1942 book Sword of Bone, in a style that reminded reviewers of Evelyn Waugh. After being promoted to captain he lectured in Canada and the United States, where he met and married a niece of Gustav Mahler. The marriage was short-lived and led to a nervous breakdown. He was invalided out of the Army 1945.

In the early post-war years he taught at Geneva University whilst reading for a degree in Romance languages. He published in 1949 The Uniform, a satirical novel about “young society women who worshipped Hitler”. Though Rhodes was not yet a Roman Catholic he embarked on a pilgrimage during the Holy Year of 1950. His journey from Terni to Rome with a donkey was later recorded in his 1952 travel book, A Sabine Journey. In 1952 he returned to England and taught romance languages at Eton College. His novel A Ball in Venice, about a comic struggle between an Englishman, an American millionairess, an art critic, and the Communist mayor, was published in 1953. Another novel, The Prophet's Carpet (1961), struck a more sombre tone. In it the character of Mr Sanderson tries to commercialise the Balkan state of "Blagoland" and this leads to conflict with a British consul who is determined to respect the people's culture and Islamic faith.

Rhodes married his second wife Rosaleen Forbes in 1956. Forbes had previously worked with General Edward Spears in Damascus and had been an ambulance driver across Africa, earning the Croix de Guerre. The Rhodes became prominent figures in London's literary circles, with Rose Macaulay, Arthur Koestler, the Sitwells and other literary figures often in attendance at the parties they held in Lower Belgrave Street.

Rhodes went to Hungary when news broke of the uprising in 1956. He likely supplied British Intelligence with reports during this period as well as writing articles on the crisis for the Daily Telegraph. He recounted this period in his subsequent book, Journey to Budapest. His biography of the 19th-century Italian writer and proto-Fascist Gabriele D'Annunzio, was published in 1960 under the title The Poet as Superman. Another biography, this time of the French car manufacturer Louis Renault, who collaborated with Hitler, was published in 1969. In 1976 he published with Victor Margolin Propaganda - The Art of Persuasion: World War II (reprinted 1993).

Rhodes translated several books such as Egyptian and Ancient Eastern Painting and the memoirs of the former Moroccan monarch King Hassan, with whom he struck up a friendship. He was an advisor to King Hassan on cultural matters for seventeen years.

Between 1973 and 1992 Rhodes published, through the encouragement of a Papal Nuncio, three history books under the series title The Power of Rome in the Twentieth Century, the product of five years of research using the archives available at the Vatican and Bonn. The first volume in the trilogy, The Vatican in the Age of Dictators 1922-45 earned the praise of Rebecca West, who considered it “scrupulously fair and informative on matters obscured by the mutterings of fools”. The second volume of the series, The Vatican in the Age of Liberal Democracies, 1870-1922, was published in 1983 and drew upon the recently released archive material of Pope Leo XIII’s reign. The final volume, The Vatican in the Age of the Cold War, was released in 1992 but had a disappointing reception. For his work on the series he was made a Papal Knight by the Roman Catholic Church and he subsequently converted to Roman Catholicism.
