= Otto Faller =

German Jesuit educator (1889–1971)

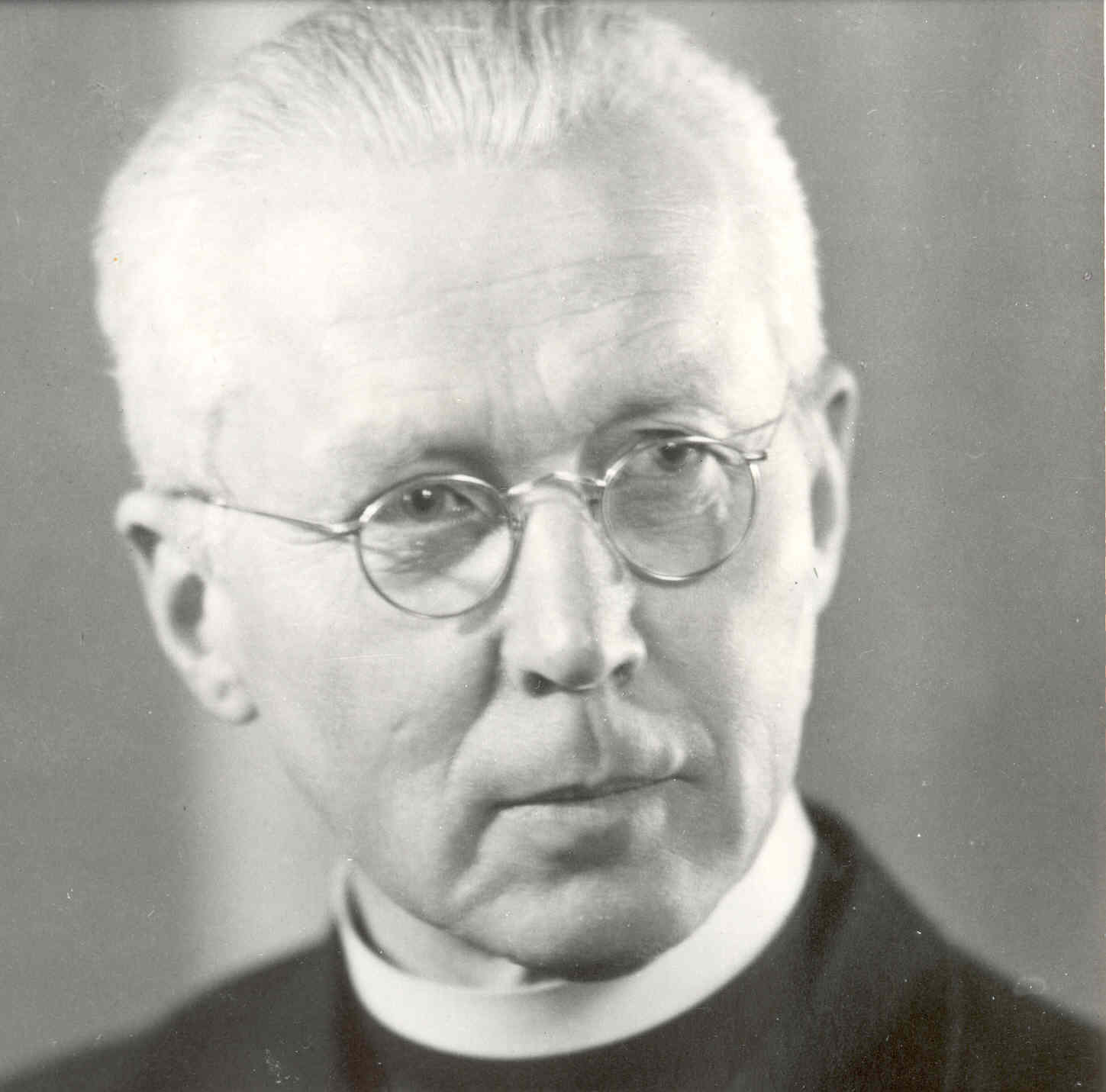
Rev. Faller in 1951

Rev. Otto Faller SJ (18 February 1889 – 16 May 1971) was Provincial Superior of the Jesuit order in Germany, educator, teacher and Dean at Stella Matutina in Feldkirch, Austria and Kolleg St. Blasien in Germany, professor of patristic studies at the Gregorian University. He was lifelong editor of the works of St. Ambrose. At the request of Pope Pius XII, he contributed to the preparation of the dogma of the assumption of Mary and organized new Papal charity and Papal refugee offices during World War II.

== Life ==
=== Early years ===
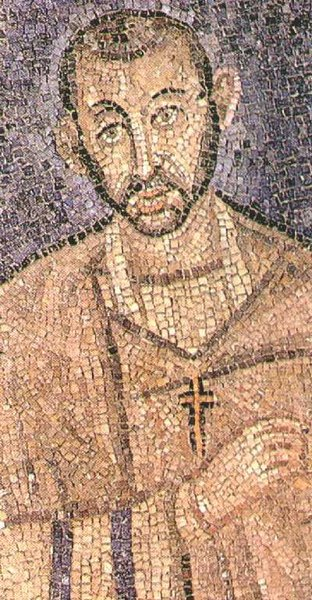
The Latin edition of the works of Saint Ambrose of Milan was the main preoccupation of Father Otto Faller

Otto Faller was born on 18 February 1889 in Saig, a small village in the Black Forest. He entered the Jesuit Order in 1910. As Jesuits had been outlawed in Germany since the time of the Kulturkampf, he studied theology in Tisis, Austria, and Valkenburg, Holland. After his philosophical and theological studies, he studied classical languages in Vienna and Münster, Germany. Otto Faller obtained two doctorates, in theology and philosophy. In 1918 he was ordained priest and in 1924 he began teaching at the prestigious Kolleg Stella Matutina in Feldkirch, Austria.

=== Educator ===
At first educator, then teacher, he was named director (dean) of the Stella Matutina Kolleg in Feldkirch, Austria. After the Nazis passed the "1000 Mark law" in 1933, which de facto prohibited any German entering Austria without prior payment of the tax and thus excluded German students from attending Austrian schools, he helped in the foundation of Kolleg St. Blasien in the Black Forest and became its dean. Five years later, the National Socialist forced the closing of the school, which was to become an Adolf Hitler school. Like several other Jesuits, he was asked to leave Germany, despite an ardent protest by the local bishop.

=== Assistant to Pope Pius XII ===
Otto Faller went to Rome, where the General of the Jesuit Order Wlodimir Ledochowski named him Professor at the Gregorian University and Father Superior at the Scriptorium, then the residence of Jesuit scholars in Rome. Together with Monsignor Ferdinando Baldelli, he was asked in 1943 by Pope Pius XII to develop a Papal charity Pontificia Commissione di Assistenza from scratch. This was developed quickly in cooperation with the charity efforts of Sister Pascalina Lehnert and Monsignore Giovanni Battista Montini. In 1944 the Pope asked him to form a new Papal refugee office to assist the tens of thousands of displaced persons in Italy.

In this capacity he was involved in the organisation of charities, especially food items, clothing and shelter for Italians and displaced persons, the negotiation of the transfer of all portable religious art from Monte Cassino, prior to its destruction. Much effort was devoted behind the scenes to a plan by the Pope, to create a Papal fleet in order to allow refugees to leave Europe for the Americas and to bring in badly needed food shipments from there; safe conduct could not be obtained by the war parties.

=== Career After 1946 ===
After the war in 1946 he returned to the Black Forest and reopened Kolleg St. Blasien against the initial advice of his superiors, but with significant material assistance of Pope Pius XII via Madre Pascalina Lehnert. In 1949, he initiated the formation of a nationwide Jesuit alumni association.

As a leading educator and Dean, Faller had experienced the State, to determine content and orientation of education on a local and national level at the expense of private educational institutions. In 1949, he formed an alliance of Catholic, Protestant and secular non-governmental schools to assure some freedom for private educational institutions especially in the State of Baden-Württemberg. They succeeded in influencing relevant legislation in several State parliaments and on the national level. On 24 September 1967, the President of the Federal Republic of Germany awarded him the pour le merite first class for his effort.

In 1950, the Jesuit general Jean-Baptiste Janssens named Father Otto Faller the head the German Jesuit Province, which included in those days the province of Kerala in India and parts of Indonesia. As Provincial, he continued pushing for the interests of private schools in Germany. In 1951, he forwarded all necessary documentation for the beatification of Rupert Mayer to Rome, and successfully supported it: Only five years later, in 1956, Pope Pius XII declared Rupert Mayer a Servant of God. Otto Faller was considered to be intelligent, compassionate, caring but also strict as superior. In 1970, he referred apologetically to this: Do not remind me of the time of my youthful transgressions. After a heart attack in 1956, he stepped down and continued his publications of Ambrose for the Commission for Editing the Corpus of the Latin Church Fathers (CSEL) in Vienna, Austria. He died at Kolleg St. Blasien on 16 May 1971.

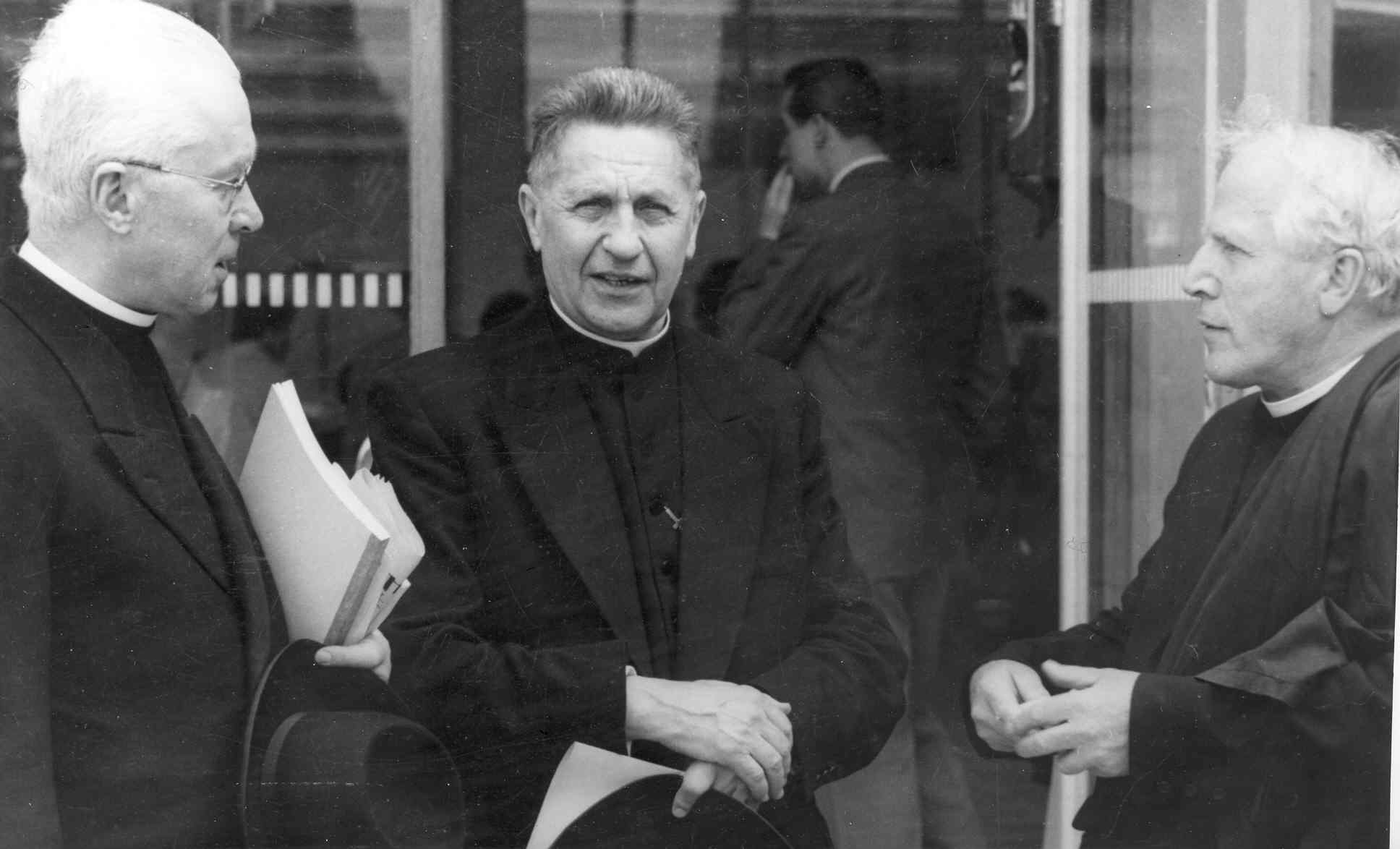
Provincial Otto Faller (left) with his predecessor Augustin Rösch (right)

== Writings ==
Many of the writings of Faller are in various Journals. In Stimmen der Zeit, Otto Faller published a number of articles on patristic topics. Aside from his book on the assumption, his main focus was St. Ambrose.

=== Dogma of the Assumption of Mary ===
While in Rome, preparations for the dogma of the Assumption of Mary were underway. Pope Pius XII asked Otto Faller, then a patristic scholar at Gregorian University, to research this issue; from this research Faller published a book in 1946, On the Silence of the Early Centuries in Latin.

=== Saint Ambrose of Milan ===
Earlier, Otto Faller began research on the writings of Ambrose of Milan, one of only four Church Fathers and a Doctor of the Church. His publications focused on the authenticity of several writings attributed to Ambrose. At the expressed wish of Pope Pius XI, a devoted Ambrose scholar and former head of the Ambrosian Library, he began research with a text critical edition of the works of Ambrose underway for the Academy of Science in Vienna since 1860. He published Ambrose works on the sacraments, explanation of symbols, the mysteries, confession, fath, Holy Spirit, and the death of emperors Theodosius and Valentinian. The letters of Ambrose he completed shortly before his death, but without, the all-important prolegomena, which would have explained his apparatus and methods. Therefore, his last Ambrose publication Epistulae et acta raised some methodological questions.

== Selected publications ==
  - Otto Faller, De Priorum Saeculorum Silentio circa Assumptionem BMV, Rome, 1946
  - Otto Faller, Ambrosius, Explanatio symboli, De sacramentis, De mysteriis, De paenitentia, De excessu fratris Satyri, De obitu Valentiniani, De obitu Theodosii, Vienna 1955, CSEL Corpus Scriptorum Ecclesiasticorum Latinorum Vol. 73
  - Otto Faller, Ambrosius, De fide ad Gratianum Augustum, Vienna 1962, CSEL Corpus Scriptorum Ecclesiasticorum Latinorum, Vol. 78
  - Otto Faller, Ambrosius, De spiritu sancto, De incarnationnis dominicae, Vienna 1964, CSEL Corpus Scriptorum Ecclesiasticorum Latinorum Vol. 79
  - Otto Faller, Ambrosius, Epistulae et acta – Vienna, 1968, CSEL Corpus Scriptorum Ecclesiasticorum Latinorum; Vol 82/1
