= Pontificia Commissione di Assistenza =

Pontificia Commissione di Assistenza (PCA), also known as “Pontificia Commissione di Assistenza ai Profughi”, “Vatican mission” and “Vatican Relief”, was a papal ad hoc commission, created by Pope Pius XII on April 18, 1944, to provide quick, non-bureaucratic and direct aid to needy populations, refugees, and prisoners in war-torn Europe.

The needs of millions of people after the war and the thirty million refugees in Europe created new challenges for charities throughout the world. Its large-scale assistance was to be quick, to the victims and basic. On April 18, 1944, Monsignore Ferdinando Baldelli, Carlo Egger and Otto Faller started on behalf of the Pope the official Pontificia Commissione di Assistenza. Parallel to these efforts, Madre Pascalina was asked by the Pope to direct his personal charity efforts, the Magazine, officially under Monsignor Montini, later Pope Paul VI. As the Vatican has decided not to publish summary statistics on the full extent of its charity, only spotty information is available. The papal Pontificia Commissione di Assistenza to the most needy populations of Europe delivered more than ninety thousand crates, weighing well over six million pounds. They were shipped by rail from Vatican station to dozens of countries, Catholic, Protestant and Pagan”. The Pope asked the faithful, bishops, governments and the United Nations for help. In 1946, he invited 50 000 children to the Vatican. They each received a full meal after which the Pope thanked the benefactors of the United Nations for their great generosity.

As Bishop of Rome, Pope Pius XII felt a personal obligation towards needy Romans. He increased papal soup kitchen rations from three million rations annually to forty million by the year 1947. On Christmas 1944, he personally gave gift packages to three thousand Roman children and delivered another four thousand to children on the Feast of Epiphany, two weeks later. By Christmas 1945, Pope Pius had forty thousand packages. The Swedish King Gustav V, awarded Pope Pius XII with the “Prince Carl Medal”, given annually to the person with the most outstanding record in charity in the world. Millions of refugees and displaced persons existed in post-war Europe, many of them in Italy. The Red Cross and the PCA did their best to issue on the spot identity papers to these millions of victims, who had lost everything. After 1990, the activities of the PCA and the Red Cross were critically reviewed, as it became known, that both organizations had aided German and Croatian war criminals to leave Europe in the so-called Rat line. Furthermore, declassified British Foreign Office and CIA documents revealed that Pope Pius XII and his closest aides Giovanni Battista Montini (who would later become Pope Paul VI) and Domenico Tardini were well informed and even played an active role.

The temporary ad hoc organization received official status on June 15, 1953, when the Pontificia Commissione di Assistenza (PCA) was renamed into Pontificia Opera di Assistenza (POA). In Northern Italy, it assisted 300,000 flood victims over a long period of time in 1953. At the death of Pope Pius XII, it assisted eight million needy persons through diocesan offices throughout Italy. Pope Pius repeatedly supported these charity efforts in several messages, his annual Christmas messages and in his encyclical Haurietas Aquas. The French hierarchy created in 1946 its own Secours catholique and the Catholic American hierarchy initiated the War Relief Services WRS, which was associated to the National Catholic Welfare Conference. The Papal and other Catholic charities depended largely on the generosity of American Catholics after the war, who contributed thirty million dollars over a very short period of time.

As national Catholic charities began to mushroom, Pope Pius XII initiated the creation of an international Catholic Charity Conference and invited national organisations to a meeting in Rome on September 15, 1950. They agreed to a permanent cooperation and elected Ferdinando Baldelli as president. In the following years, Catholic charities developed in Latin America and Asia. As war relief services lost in importance, these charities specialized increasingly in emergency aid, such as Hungarian refugees after the revolution, earthquakes, or floods in The Netherlands, Belgium and Italy. In 1970, POA was changed into Caritas Italiana by Pope Paul VI.

Although Pope Pius XII began to speak on the subject in his last months of 1958, the concept of large-scale international development aid was not formalized during the time of Pope Pius.

== Magazino of Madre Pascalina Lehnert ==
To assist the pope in the many calls for his help and charity, Pascalina Lehnert organized and led the Magazino, a private papal charity office, which began with 40 helpers and continued until 1959. “It started from modest beginnings and became a gigantic charity”. Pascalina organized truck caravans filled with medicine, clothing, shoes and food to prison camps and hospitals, provided first aid, food and shelter for bomb victims, fed the hungry population of Rome, answered emergency calls for aid to the Pope, sent care packages to France, Poland, Czechoslovakia, Germany and Austria and other countries. After the war, the calls for papal help continued in war-torn Europe: Madre Pascalina organized emergency aid to displaced persons, prisoners of war, victims of floods, and many victims of the war. Pascalina distributed also hundreds of religious items to needy priests. In later years, priests with very large parishes received small cars or motor bikes.” The Pope was personally involved, constantly asking bishops from the United States, Argentina, Brazil, Switzerland, Canada, Mexico, and other countries for help”. cardinals and bishops freely visited Madre Pascalina, who by now was nicknamed Virgo Potens, powerful virgin.

== Literature ==
- L’Attivita della Santa Sede, Tipographia Poliglotta Vaticana, 1944–1958
- Erwin Gatz: Karitas und kirchliche Hilfswerke, in Handbuch der Kirchengeschichte, Herder, Freiburg, 1985
- A. Giovagnoli: La Ponteficia Commissione di Assistenza e gli aiuti americani 1945–1948, i Storia contemporanea n 5–6, 1978
- Uki Goñi: The Real Odessa. How Peron Brought the Nazi War Criminals to Argentina, Granta, London-New York, 2003 (revised edition)
- Primo Mazzolari: La Carità Del Papa, Pio XII e la ricostruzione dell’Italia, Edizione Paoline, 1991
- Jan Olav Smit: Pope Pius XII, Burns Oates & Washbourne, London-Dublin, 1950
