= Ferdinando Baldelli =

Ferdinando Baldelli (September 26, 1886 – September 20, 1963) was an Italian Catholic bishop. He was President of the Pontificia Commissione di Assistenza (1944–1959) and President of Caritas Internationalis (1951–1962).

== Biography ==
A native of Pergola, Ferdinando Baldelli was ordained as Catholic priest in 1909. In 1944 he suggested to Pope Pius XII the creation of a Papal Charity. Pascalina Lehnert credits Baldelli with the idea of a papal aid organization, which Pope Pius XII supported enthusiastically until his death. He founded Pontificia Commissione di Assistenza, sometimes called Pontificia Opera di Assistenza, together with Carlo Egger and Otto Faller. The Pope was personally involved, constantly asking Cardinals and Bishop from the United States Argentina, Brazil, Switzerland, Canada, Mexico, and other countries for help. The commissione existed until 1959.

During the Holy Year of 1950, Pope Pius XII decided to link and internationalize Catholic charity work. Following a suggestion by Monsignor Giovanni Battista Montini, a study week, with participants from 22 countries, was held in Rome to examine the problems of Christian Caritas work. As a result, the decision was made to set up an international conference of Catholic charities.

In December 1951, upon approval of the statutes by the Holy See, the first constitutive General Assembly of Caritas (charity) took place. Ferdinando Baldelli was elected as the first president. Founding members came from organisations in 13 countries: Austria, Belgium, Canada, Denmark, France, Germany, Holland, Italy, Luxembourg, Portugal, Spain, Switzerland, and the United States. In 1957, the confederation changed its name to Caritas Internationalis.

Pope John XXIII appointed him to be president of the Curia and titular bishop of Aperlae. October 25, 1959, he was ordained.

Baldelli died September 20, 1963, in Rome.

== Sources ==
- Lehnert, Pascalina (1984). Ich durfte Ihm Dienen. Würzburg: Naumann.
- Mazzolari, Primo (1991). La carità del Papa - Pio XII e la ricostruzione dell'Italia. Edizioni Paoline.
