= Zuccotti =

Zuccotti is a surname. Notable people with the surname include:

- John Eugene Zuccotti (1937–2015), Italian-American businessman
  - Zuccotti Park, New York City park
- Susan Zuccotti (born 1940), American historian, wife of John
