= Jaquelin T. Robertson =

American architect (1933–2020)

Jaquelin Taylor Robertson, informally known as "Jaque," (March 20, 1933 – May 9, 2020) was an American architect and urban designer, working at Cooper Robertson. He was a representative of New Urbanism and New Classical Architecture.

== Early life and education ==
Robertson was born and raised in Richmond, Virginia on a classical family-owned estate. His family was aristocratic and lived in a Georgian-style house; he is a descendant of presidents Zachary Taylor and James Madison. His father Walter worked for the U.S. State Department and was special envoy to China for several years. After graduating from Yale College with a Bachelor of Arts degree in 1954 and spending a year at Oxford University as a Rhodes Scholar, Robertson received a Master of Architecture degree from Yale School of Architecture in 1961.

== Career ==
Working in New York City Planning, he was the founder of the New York City Urban Design Group, the first Director of the Mayor's Office of Midtown Planning and Development, and a City Planning Commissioner.

In 1975, he spent three years in Tehran, Iran, directing the planning and design of the country's new capitol center Shahestan Pahlavi in the Abbas Abad district of Tehran.

From 1980 to 1988, Robertson was Dean of the University of Virginia School of Architecture where there is now an Endowed Professorship in his name entitled the "Jaquelin T. Robertson Visiting Professorship in Architecture." At UVA, Robertson often invited notable guest speakers and organized a famous symposium with 25 of the nation's leading architects, including Robert A. M. Stern and Léon Krier, that resulted in the publication of a book entitled The Charlottesville Tapes. During this same period (1980 to 1987), he was partnered with Peter Eisenman in the firm Eisenman/Robertson Architects in New York City.

In 1988, he stepped down from the University of Virginia post and his partnership with Peter Eisenman to join his Yale School of Architecture classmate Alex Cooper in his firm in New York City, established now under a new name: Cooper, Robertson & Partners.

His notable work includes the New Albany Country Club in New Albany, Ohio outside Columbus, the Visitor Center at the Lewis Ginter Botanical Garden in Richmond, Virginia, the Henry Moore Sculpture Garden at the Nelson-Atkins Museum of Art, the Master Plan for Celebration, Florida for the Disney Development Company as well as the Golf Clubhouse there, The Institute for the Arts & Humanities at the University of North Carolina at Chapel Hill, the Master Plan for the new community of Val d'Europe, outside Paris, France, the Sony Pictures Imageworks Headquarters Building in Culver City, California, and numerous private residences.

Having designed many AIA (American Institute of Architects) award-winning houses, many of which are in the Hamptons on the East End of Long Island and in the Caribbean, Robertson was named one of "the AD 100," Architectural Digest's list of the top 100 architects and interior designers whose work has been published by Architectural Digest over the years.

Robertson was both a Fellow of the American Institute of Architects and a Fellow of the American Institute of Certified Planners.

Robertson died of Alzheimer's disease in East Hampton, New York, in May 2020.

== Career awards ==
- Thomas Jefferson Medal in Architecture (1998)
- Seaside Institute Prize (2002)
- Richard H. Driehaus Prize (2007)
- Athena Medal from the Congress for the New Urbanism (2010)

== Quotes ==
- "The symbolic hard currency of architecture is classical,... It's gold in the bank. The other stuff is leveraged buy-outs and soybean futures."
- “We [architects] don’t seem to understand very well yet how our society works or what our people want or need, and we are continually caught up in a kind of Alice-in-Wonderland situation of either giving answers to questions no one is asking or ignoring completely some of the more pressing and obvious problems.”
- “Architects must have in front of them some notion about the order of the whole, not just the parts.”
