= Cooper Robertson =

US-based architecture and urban design firm

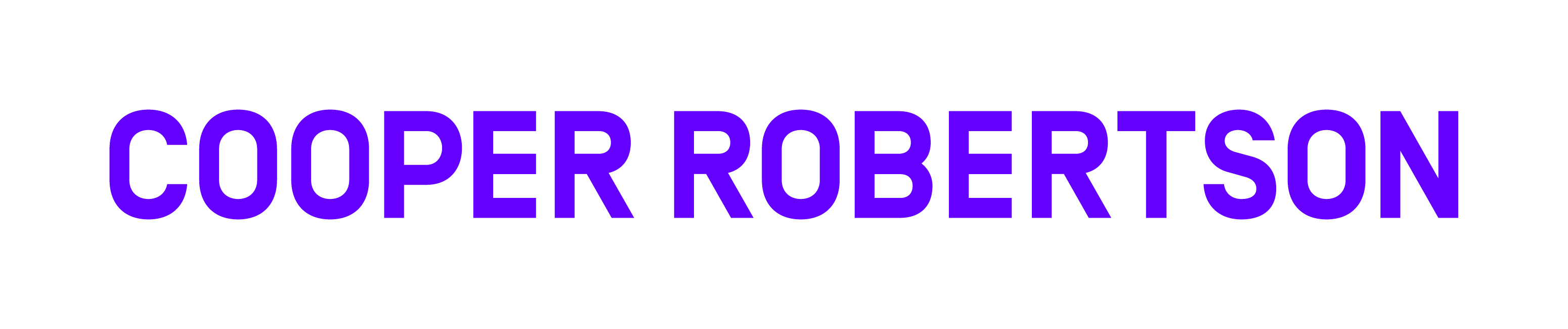
- Industry: Architecture
- Founded: 1979; 47 years ago New York, NY
- Founder: Alex Cooper FAIA; Jaquelin T. Robertson FAIA (1933–2020)
- Defunct: November 3, 2025; 6 months ago
- Fate: Acquired by Corgan
- Successor: Corgan
- Headquarters: 123 William Street, New York City, U.S.
- Area served: International
- Key people: Michael Aziz, AIA, LEED AP; Donald Clinton, AIA, MRAIC, LEED AP; Bruce Davis, AIA LEED AP; Erin Flynn, RA, LEED AP; John Kirk, AIA
- Services: Architecture, Urban Design, Planning
- Website: www.cooperrobertson.com

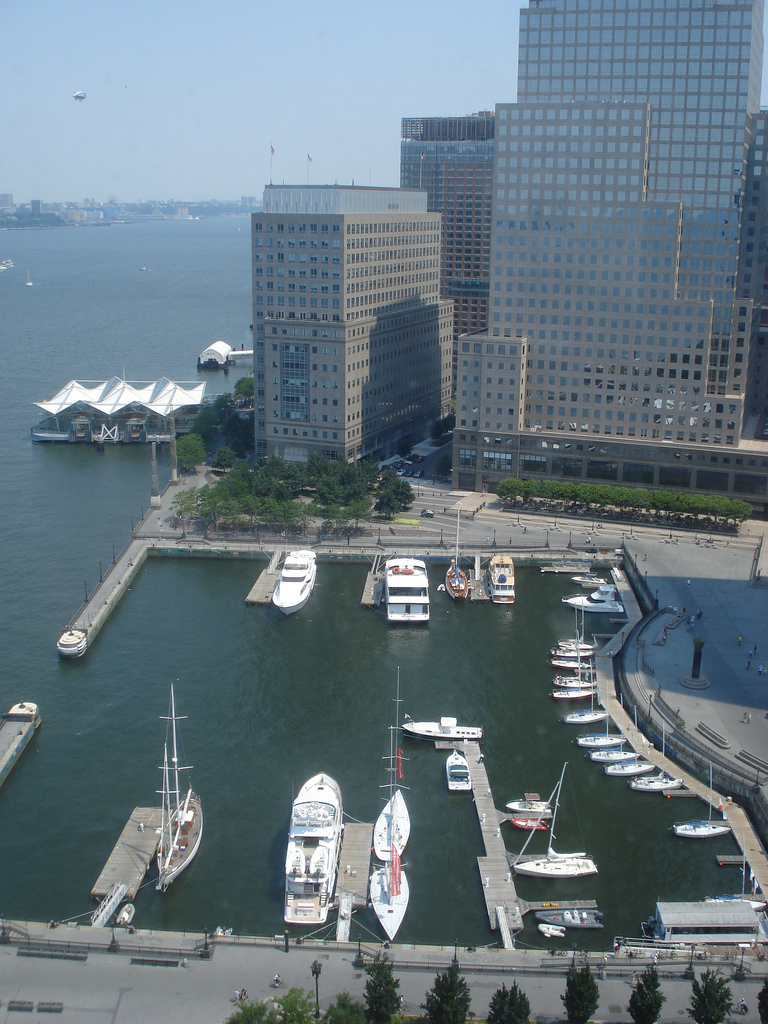
Battery Park City North Cove

Cooper Robertson was an international architecture and urban design firm, headquartered in New York City. It was founded in 1979 by Alex Cooper and Jaquelin T. Robertson. On November 3, 2025, Cooper Robertson was acquired by Corgan and fully integrated into the firm.

== History ==
Cooper Robertson was founded in 1979, by Alex Cooper under the name Alexander Cooper and Associates. Both Cooper and Robertson attended Yale College during the same period, later working together at the New York City Department of City Planning. The firm changed its name to Cooper, Robertson & Partners when Robertson joined in 1988. In 2015, they rebranded again to "Cooper Robertson".

The firm's work has included planned communities, urban infill, transit-oriented developments, including Battery Park City in New York and the new communities of Celebration, Florida, Watercolor, Florida and Val d'Europe outside Paris, France. In the past, the firm has focused on architecture, open space design, and university campus planning. The firm's work includes a plan for the expansion of Harvard University's campus into Allston, Massachusetts, MOMA QNS, (the Museum of Modern Art's temporary home in Queens, New York), the New Albany Country Club in New Albany, Ohio outside Columbus, the new Columbia University School of Social Work building in Upper Manhattan, the Visitor Center at the Lewis Ginter Botanical Garden in Richmond, Virginia, the Framework for Campus Planning for Yale University, Zuccotti Park, and numerous housing developments, primarily located in the Hamptons on the East End of Long Island and in the Caribbean.

== Awards and distinctions ==
Some of the awards Cooper Robertson have received include, but are not limited to:

- The American Architecture Award for the Museum at the Gateway Arch, 2019
- DOCOMOMO Modernism in America, Civic Design Award of Excellence for the Museum at the Gateway Arch, 2019
- Society of American Registered Architects (SARA) National Design Award for The Edible Academy, 2018
- American Institute of Architects New York State Award of Excellence for the Master Plan of the Central Delaware, Philadelphia, Pennsylvania, 2013
- Alex Cooper & Jaquelin T. Robertson, Seaside Prize from the Seaside Institute, 2002
- Robertson on "the AD 100," Architectural Digest's list of the top 100 architects and interior designers whose work has been published by Architectural Digest.
- Jaquelin T. Robertson, Thomas Jefferson Medal in Architecture, 1998
- Jaquelin T. Robertson, Driehaus Prize for Classical Architecture, 2007
- Urban Land Institute Award for Excellence: Europe Competition for Val d'Europe, 2008
- Prix Rotthier pour la Reconstruction de La Ville for Val d'Europe, 2008
- American Institute of Architects (AIA) Honor Award in Regional and Urban Design for Zuccotti Park, 2008
- AIA Excellence in Design Award for MOMA QNS 2004
- National AIA Citation for Excellence in Urban Design for Battery Park City Master Plan 1991

== Select Projects ==
Work by Cooper Robertson includes:

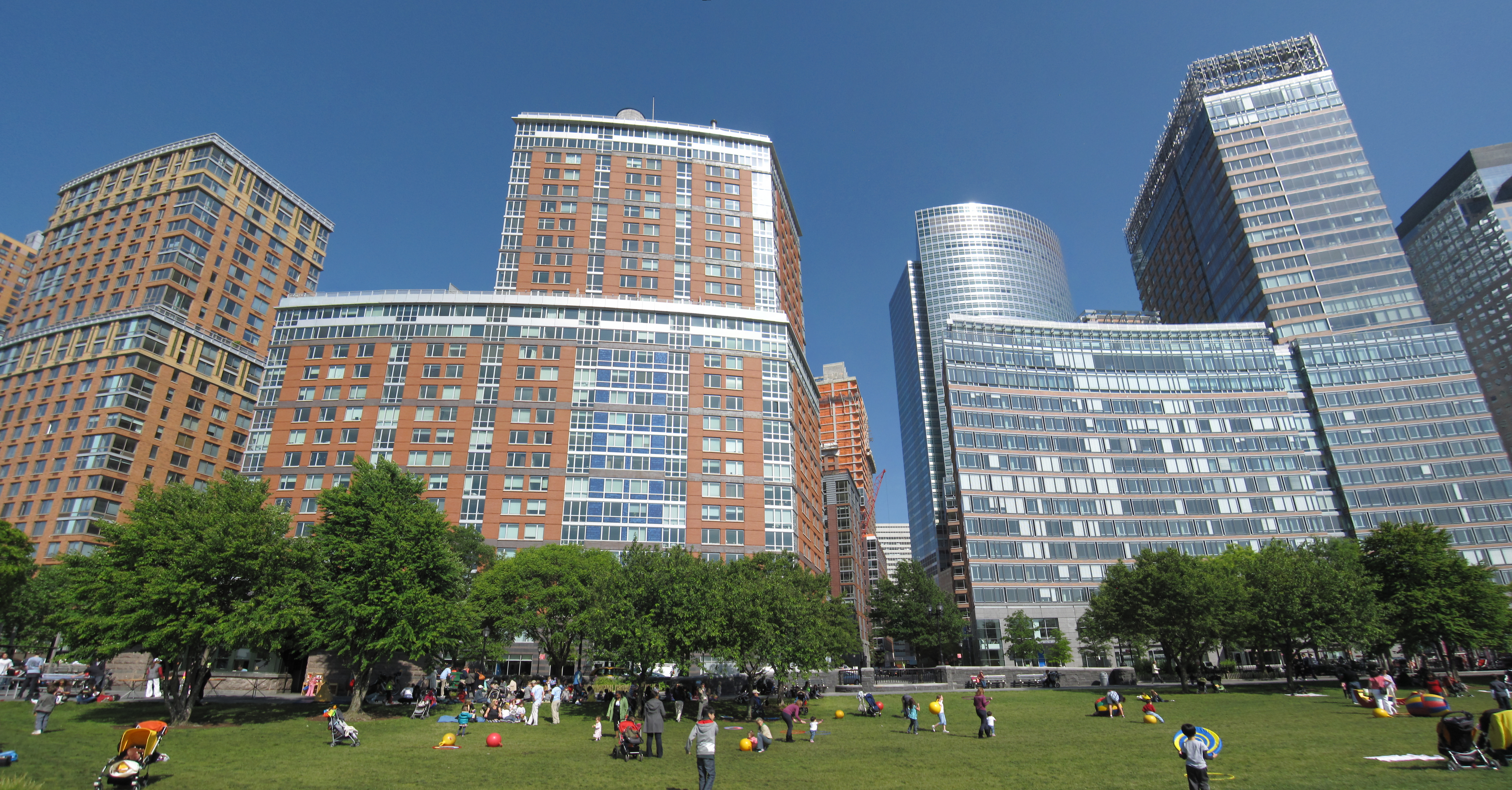
Battery Park City Master Plan (1980)

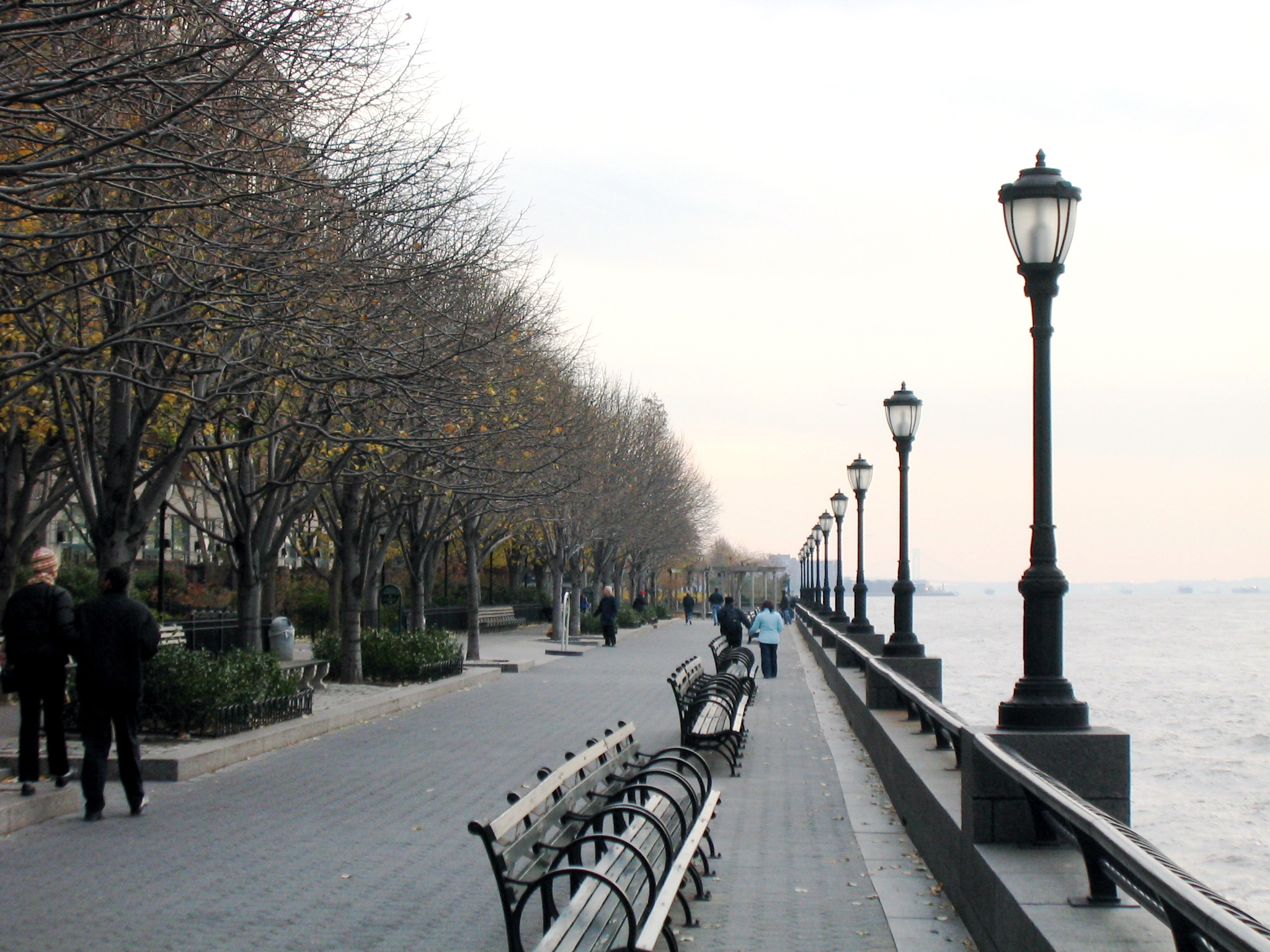
Battery Park City Esplanade (1985)

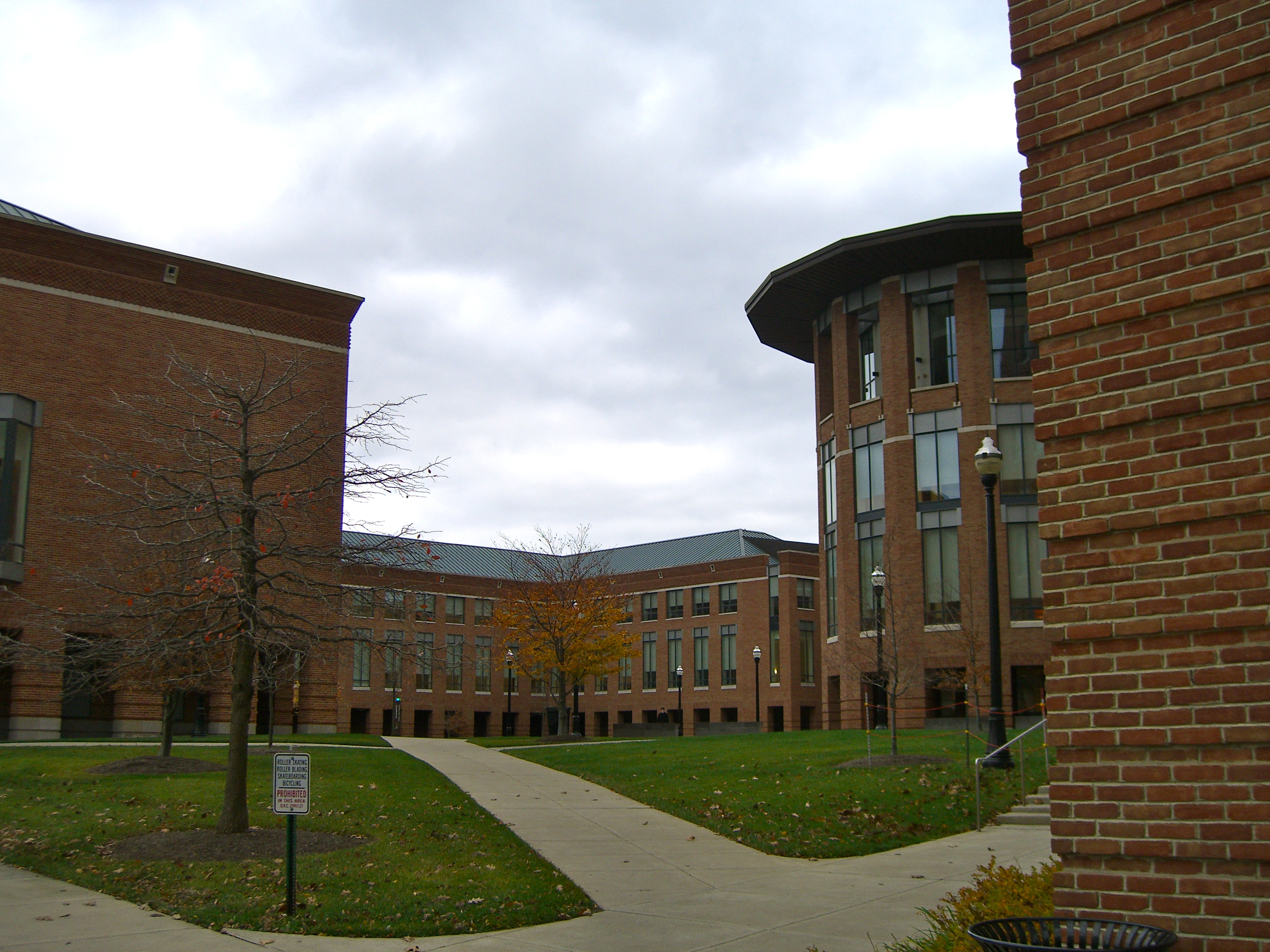
Max M. Fisher College of Business at the Ohio State University (1999)

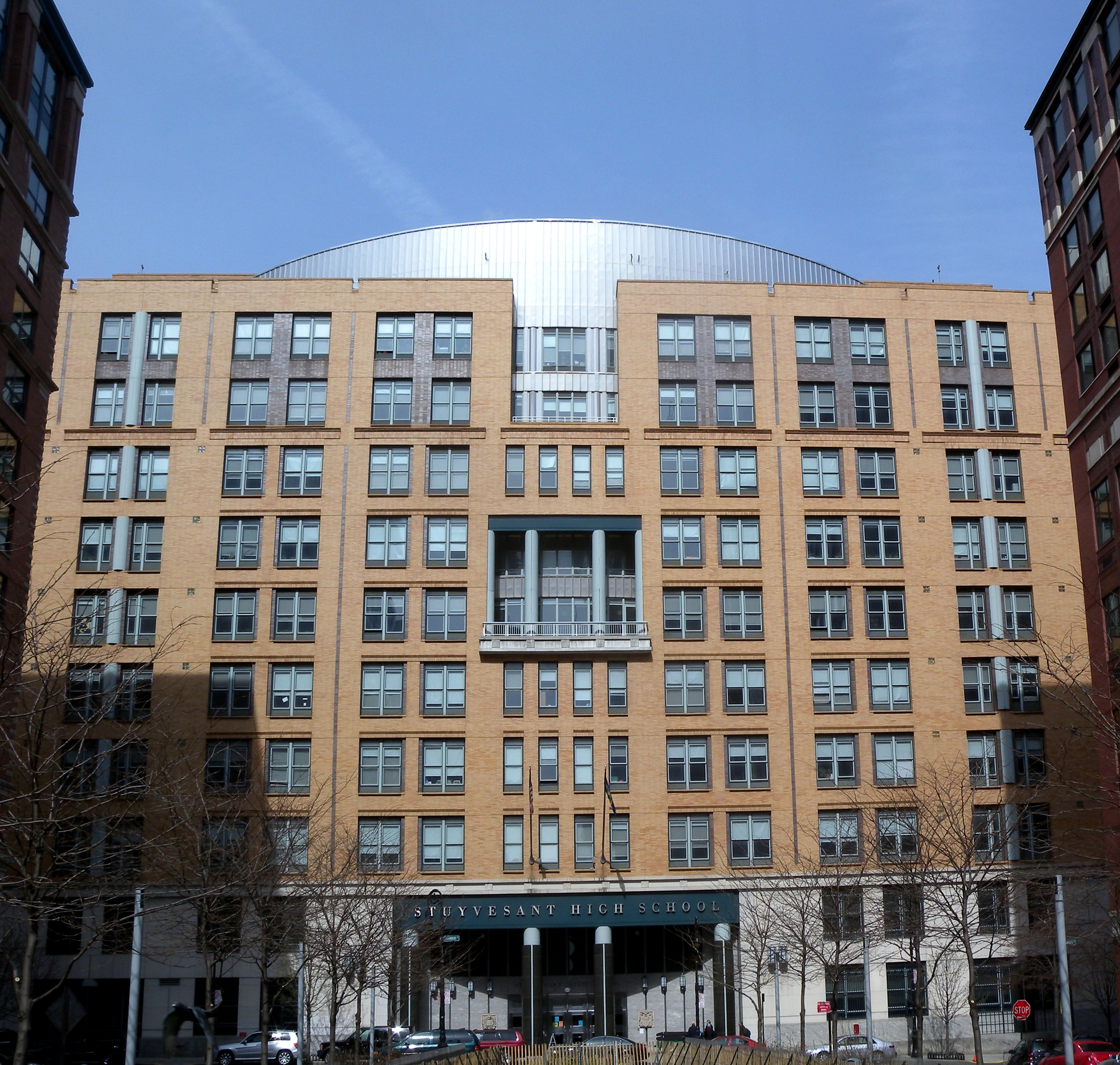
Stuyvesant High School (1992)

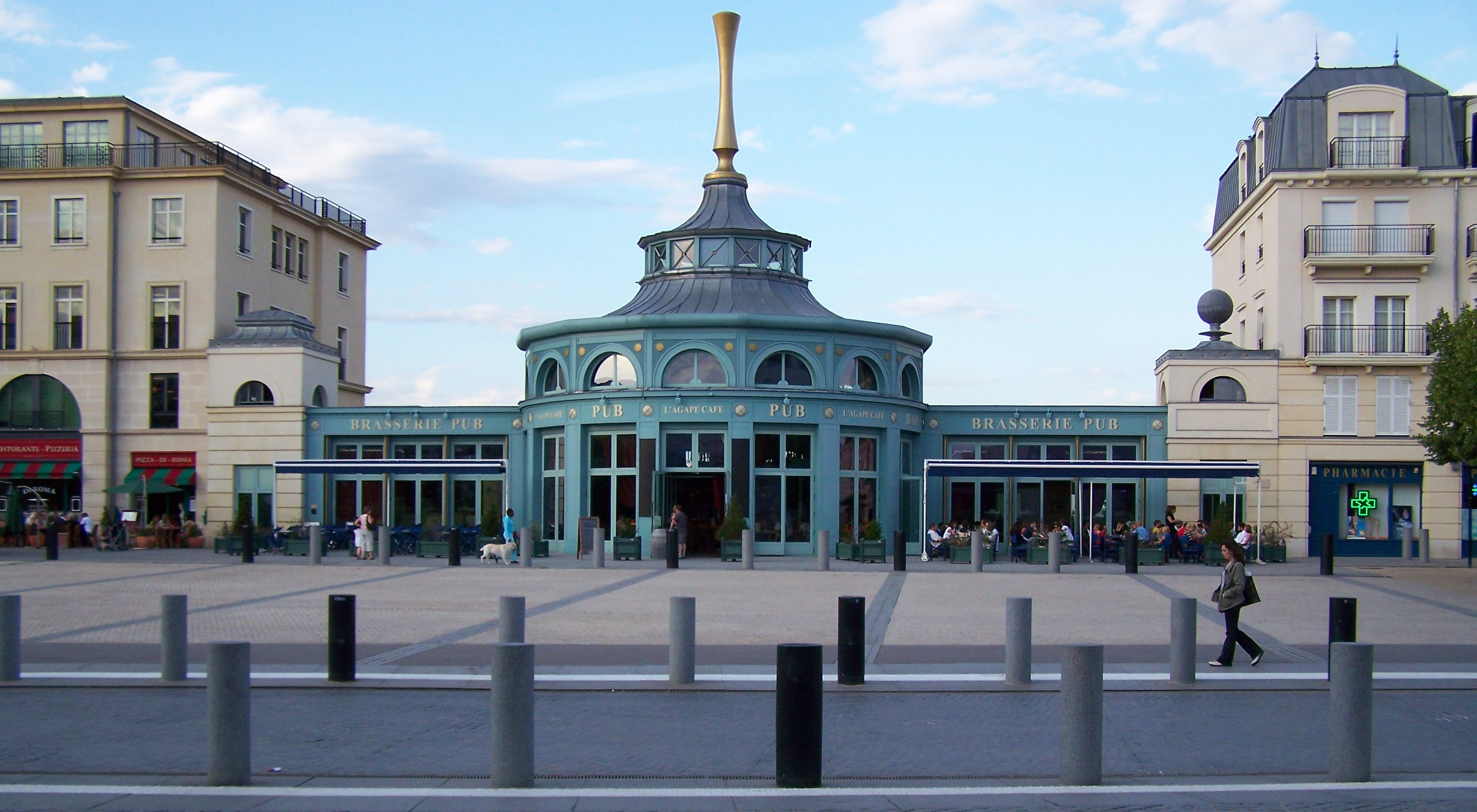
Val d'Europe (2002)

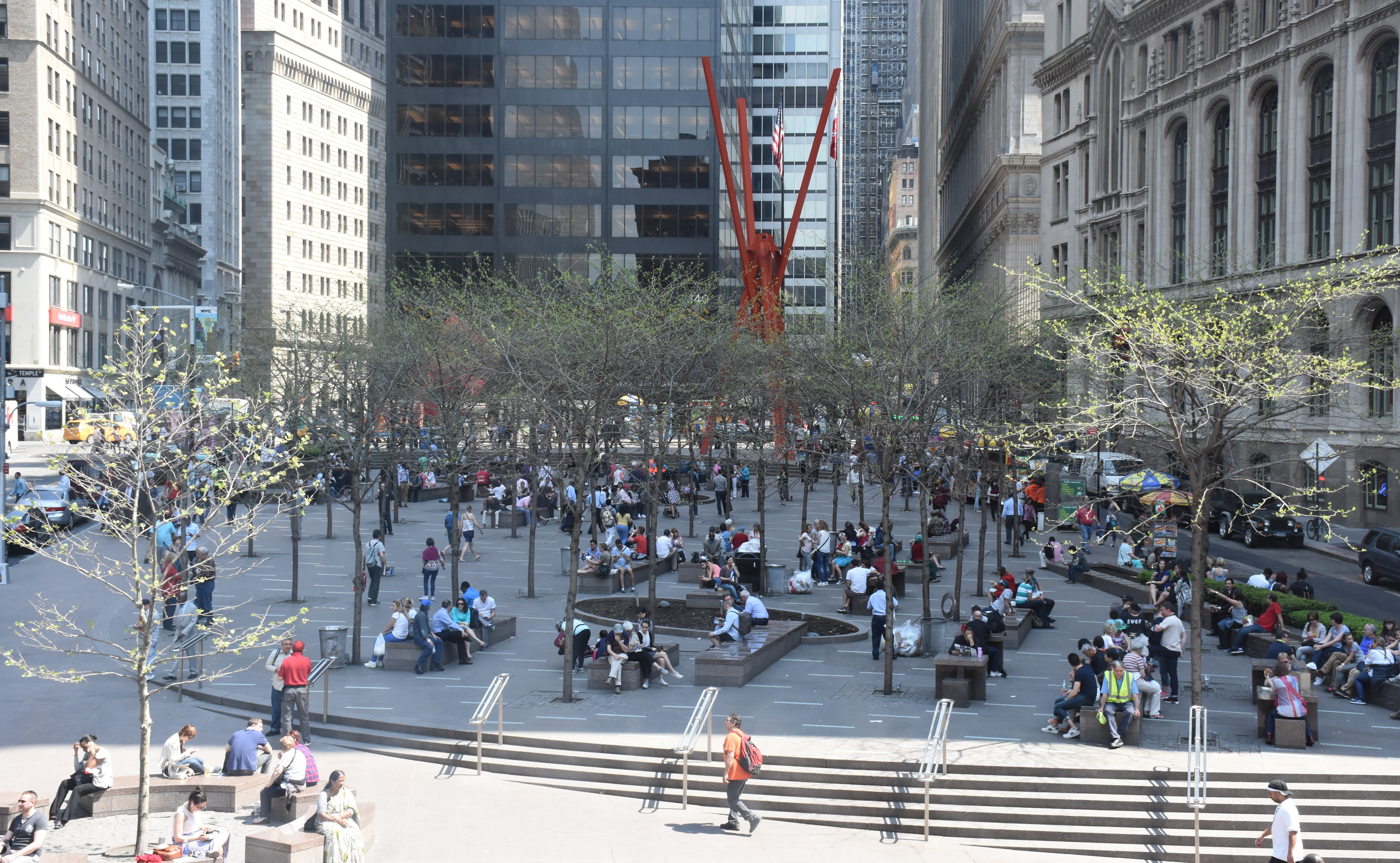
Zuccotti Park (2006)

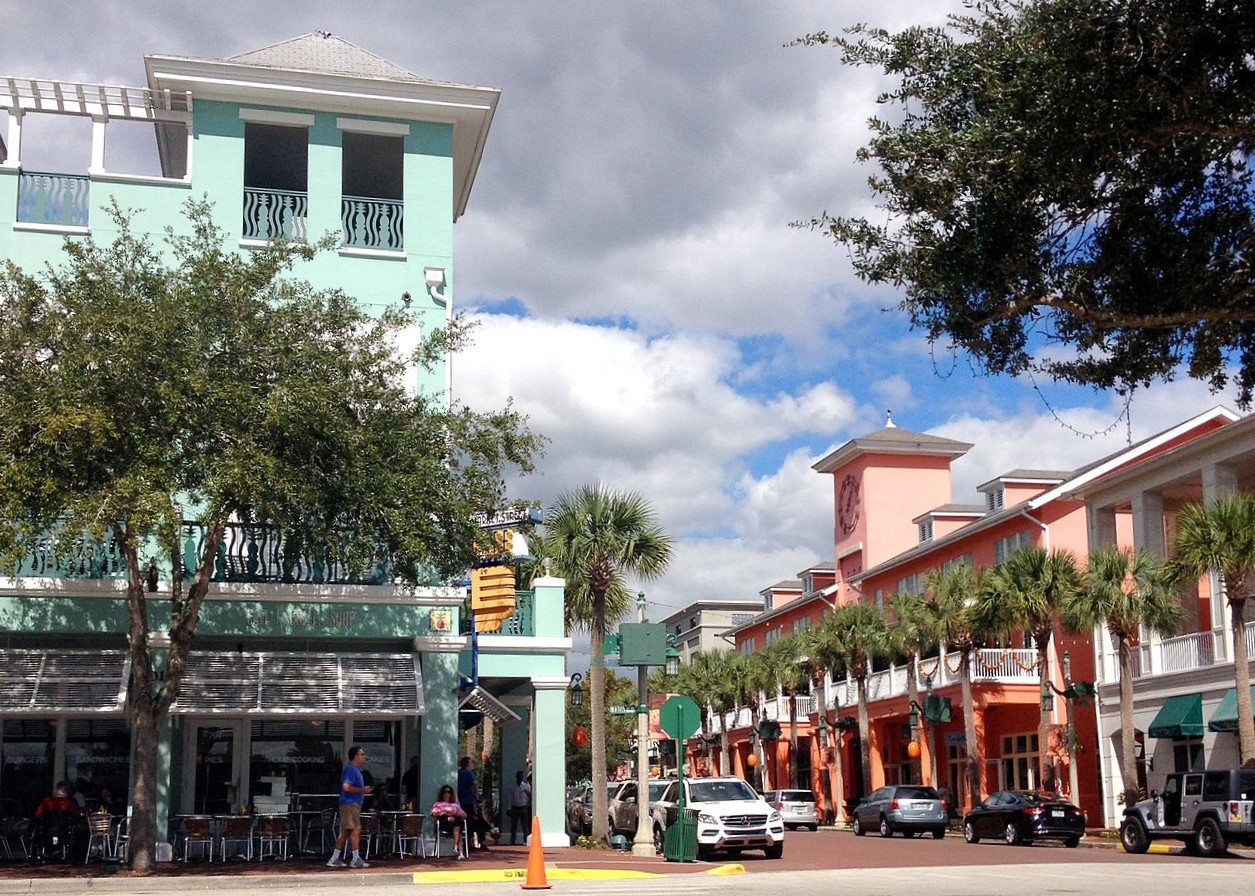
Master Plan for Celebration, Florida for the Disney Development Company (1997)

- Princeton University Art Museum (2025)
- The Museum at the Gateway Arch (2018)
- Miracle Mile & Giralda Avenue Streetscape in Coral Gables, Florida (2018)
- The Edible Academy at New York Botanical Garden (2018)
- Drury University Master Plan (2017)
- Museum Park (Miami) Master Plan (2014)
- Harlem Village Academies High School (2013)
- University of Miami Master Plan (2012)
- Richard Rodgers Amphitheater in Marcus Garvey Park (2011)
- Ethical Culture Fieldston School (2007)
- Zuccotti Park (2006)
- Fordham University at Lincoln Center Campus Master Plan (2006)
- WindMark Beach, Florida for the St. Joe Company (2005)
- Hudson Yards Redevelopment Project (2005)
- Chula Vista Bayfront Master Plan (2004)
- Columbia University School of Social Work (2004)
- Watercolor, Florida for the St. Joe Company (2003)
- County of Charleston Judicial Center in Charleston, South Carolina (2003)
- The Inn At Perry Cabin (2002)
- The Institute for the Arts & Humanities at the University of North Carolina at Chapel Hill (2002)
- Val d'Europe (2002)
- Memphis Riverfront Master Plan (2001)
- MOMA QNS 2000
- Yale University Framework for Campus Planning (2000)
- Disneyland Resort Expansion Plan (2000)
- Max M. Fisher College of Business at the Ohio State University (1999)
- Boston Seaport Public Realm Plan (1999)
- Duke Clinic at Duke University Medical Center (1999)
- Lower Manhattan Streetscape Project (1998)
- Master Plan for Celebration, Florida for the Disney Development Company (1997)
- Golf Clubhouse at Celebration, Florida (1997)
- Trinity College Campus Master Plan (1997)
- E. Claiborne Robins Visitors Center and the Anne Holt Massey Greenhouses at the Lewis Ginter Botanical Garden (1997)
- Disney's Hilton Head Island Resort (1996)
- Sony Pictures Imageworks Headquarters Building (1996)
- Stapleton Airport Redevelopment Plan (1996)
- Calvin Klein Cosmetics Company Headquarters (1995)
- Genesis Apartments at Union Square (New York City) for HELP (the Housing Enterprise for the Less Privileged) (1994)
- Daniel Island Master Plan (1993)
- New Albany Country Club: Golf Clubhouse and Bath & Tennis Club (1993)
- Stuyvesant High School (1992)
- Henry Moore Sculpture Garden at the Nelson-Atkins Museum of Art (1988)
- Battery Park City Esplanade (1985)
- Battery Park City Master Plan (1980)
- International Trade Center Master Plan, Mount Olive Township, New Jersey (1979)
