= Alex Cooper =

Alex Cooper may refer to:

- Alex Cooper (architect) (born 1936), American architect
- Alex Cooper (footballer) (born 1991), Scottish footballer
- Alex Cooper (podcaster) (born 1994), American podcaster

== See also ==
- Alexander Cooper (1609–1660), English Baroque miniature painter
