= Alex Cooper (architect) =

American architect

- Born: 1936 (age 89–90); Pittsburgh, Pennsylvania, US
- Education: Yale University
- Occupation: Architect
- Awards: AIA Thomas Jefferson Award for Public Architecture (2012), Seaside Prize (2002)
- Practice: Cooper, Robertson & Partners
- Buildings: Columbia University School of Social Work, Stuyvesant High School, Clinic at Duke University Medical Center, Fisher College of Business at OSU, Genesis on 13st.
- Projects: Battery Park City, Central Delaware Plan, International Trade Center, Yale University Framework for Campus Planning, Central Delaware Riverfront, Ethical Culture Highschool Addition & Renovation

Alexander Cooper, FAIA, (born 1936) is an American architect and urban designer. In his 1987 piece on Cooper in The New York Times, Paul Goldberger wrote that Cooper "might be the most influential architect in New York right now. Surely, no architect is having as much impact, not only on the design of individual buildings, but on the shape of wide swaths of the city."

Cooper has worked in Chicago, Boston, Denver, and Baltimore, as well as campus plans and buildings at Yale University, Georgetown University, and University of California, Santa Cruz. He has worked most extensively in New York City, where he has designed and planned many of the city's major sites such as Battery Park City, the Times Square Theater District, redevelopment projects throughout the area, and Hudson Yards.

== Design approach ==
Cooper said in a 1985 interview that: "An urban designer is someone who designs, rather than plans, major pieces of cities. Urban design, then is the art of city design."

Cooper also believes that in urban design, the public's needs are paramount: "the public is out there on the streets. They're not paying to use the space, but they occupy the city. The point of urban design is to make their lives more satisfactory, and to make them feel good about being in the city and what the city provides".

== Early career ==
After graduating from Yale University, Cooper got a Master of Architecture degree from Yale School of Architecture. After graduation, he worked with the architects Philip Johnson and Edward Larrabee Barnes. While working for Johnson, Cooper worked on Philips' Glass House in New Canaan.

Soon after, Cooper began work in the public sector for the City of New York, first as Director of Design for New York's Housing and Development Administration, then as Director of the Urban Design Group and the Mayor's Urban Design Council of the New York City Department of City Planning under John Lindsay's administration. His final position in the public sphere was as a member of the New York City Planning Commission.

While working at the Urban Design Group within the Department of City Planning, Cooper created a new section of the Zoning Resolution, "Housing Quality". This new section created a scoring system, which rewarded good practices that include corridors that provided daylight, and appropriate scale of buildings. This approach became an optional standard for all housing design within the city.

== Cooper, Robertson & Partners ==
Cooper's private practice began in 1979, when he founded Alexander Cooper & Associates in New York City after 12 years of public service. In 1988, Cooper partnered with his Yale School of Architecture classmate Jaquelin T. Robertson, changing the firm's name to Cooper, Robertson & Partners.

The firm has written many design guidelines under Cooper's supervision, which are now industry standards for plan implementation. In total, the firm has written guidelines for over 25 million square feet of completed development.

Cooper's projects have created settings that did not exist prior to his work, including Battery Park City, the Hudson River Esplanade and Zuccotti Park in the busy Financial District of Manhattan. He has created walkways in several cities that millions use annually, and created open spaces.

== Major projects ==
His notable work-to-date in urban design includes Battery Park City, New York City's west side Hudson Yards Redevelopment Project, the expansion of the Museum of Modern Art, the International Trade Center, Yale University's Framework for Campus Planning, and Zuccotti Park.

His work in architecture to date includes the Columbia University School of Social Work, Stuyvesant High School in lower Manhattan, Duke University Medical Center's Clinic, and both Fisher Hall and Pfahl Hall at the Fisher College of Business at the Ohio State University in Columbus, Ohio.

== Other interests and awards ==
As an academic, Cooper directed the Graduate Urban Design Program at GSAPP, Columbia University.

He is a Fellow of the American Institute of Architects. He received the Seaside Prize from the Seaside Institute in 2002.
