= Corpus Christi Catholic Church (Celebration, Florida) =

Coordinates: 28.3125°N 81.5478°W

Corpus Christi Catholic Church of Celebration Florida
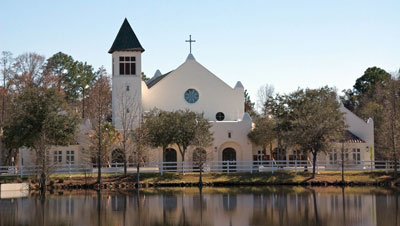
- Motto: Christmas is the reason for Living
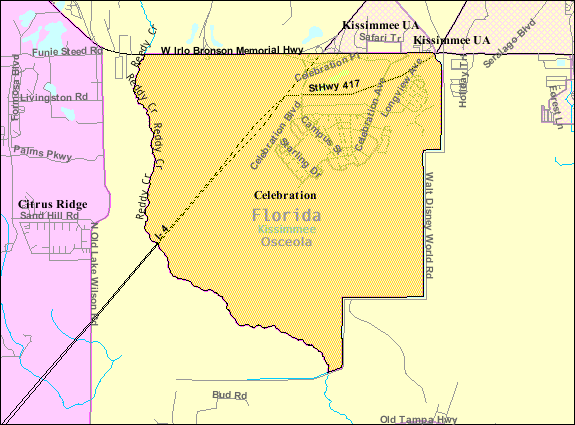
- Country: United States
- State: Florida
- County: Osceola
- City: Celebration
- ZIP code: 34747
- Area code: 321
- Website: http://www.celebrationcatholic.org/

The Corpus Christi Catholic Church is located at Celebration, Florida, a master-planned community in Osceola County, Florida, United States, near Walt Disney World Resort. The church is part of the Roman Catholic Diocese of Orlando. The parish population was made up of around 100 families at the start of the community in 2005, but as of 2017 is estimated to be more than 1,000 families.

Church services were first held at the Celebration K8 School and then later in the Celebration High School cafeteria. The church was designed by Cooper Johnson Smith Architects & Town Planners. Groundbreaking for the church was in November 2008, though construction (by general contractor Brasfield & Gorrie) did not begin in earnest until the following January. Rev. Gregory Parkes, the parish priest, was able to say the first Mass in the building on the morning of Christmas Eve.

Construction was completed on December 24, 2009, and it was consecrated on Saturday, January 16, 2010, with Bishop Thomas Wenski of Orlando presiding.

Today, the church is led by Fr. Richard W. Trout, Jr.
