= John Eugene Zuccotti =

Italian-American businessman (1937–2015)

- Born: John Eugene Zuccotti; June 23, 1937; Greenwich Village, New York City, U.S.
- Died: November 19, 2015 (aged 78); Brooklyn, New York City, U.S.
- Occupation: Real estate developer
- Spouse: Susan Zuccotti
- Children: 3
- Parent(s): Angelo and Gemma Zuccotti
- Relatives: Andrew Zuccotti

John Eugene Zuccotti ([dzukˈkɔtti]; June 23, 1937 – November 19, 2015) was an American businessman active in real estate and development in New York City. He is best known as the namesake of Zuccotti Park.

== Early life and education ==
Zuccotti was born on June 23, 1937, in Greenwich Village, New York City, to Angelo and Gemma Zuccotti. He had one brother, Andrew. His father was an Italian immigrant to the United States who was known in New York City's high society as the longtime maitre d' of El Morocco, a nightclub frequented by the rich and famous.

Zuccotti graduated in 1959 from Princeton University with a bachelor's degree. He earned a JD degree from Yale Law School in 1963.

== Career ==
Zuccotti served in a number of governmental and civic positions including member of the New York City Planning Commission starting in 1971, of which he became chairman in 1973. In mid-November 1975, he was named first deputy mayor of the city by Mayor Abraham D. Beame, serving until 1977 Zuccotti practiced law from 1977 until 1990.

Zuccotti served as assistant to the secretary of Housing and Urban Development and as chairman of the Real Estate Board of New York. He was also a board member of groups as diverse as World Trade Center Memorial Foundation and the Visiting Nurse Service of New York.

As a businessman, Zuccotti was active in the development of New York City, as a partner in a number of real estate firms including Olympia & York, and law firms such as Brown & Wood, Tufo + Zuccotti, and Weil, Gotshal & Manges, and as the U.S. chairman of Brookfield Properties.

Politically, Zuccotti was active in both Democratic and Republican politics on both the local and national level, serving at various times on the National Republican Congressional Committee and Joe Biden's presidential campaign.

Zuccotti was married to Susan Sessions Zuccotti, the author of a number of books relating to the Holocaust. He died of a heart attack on November 19, 2015. aged 78.
