= Celebration, Florida =

MPC and CDP in Osceola County, Florida

- CDP
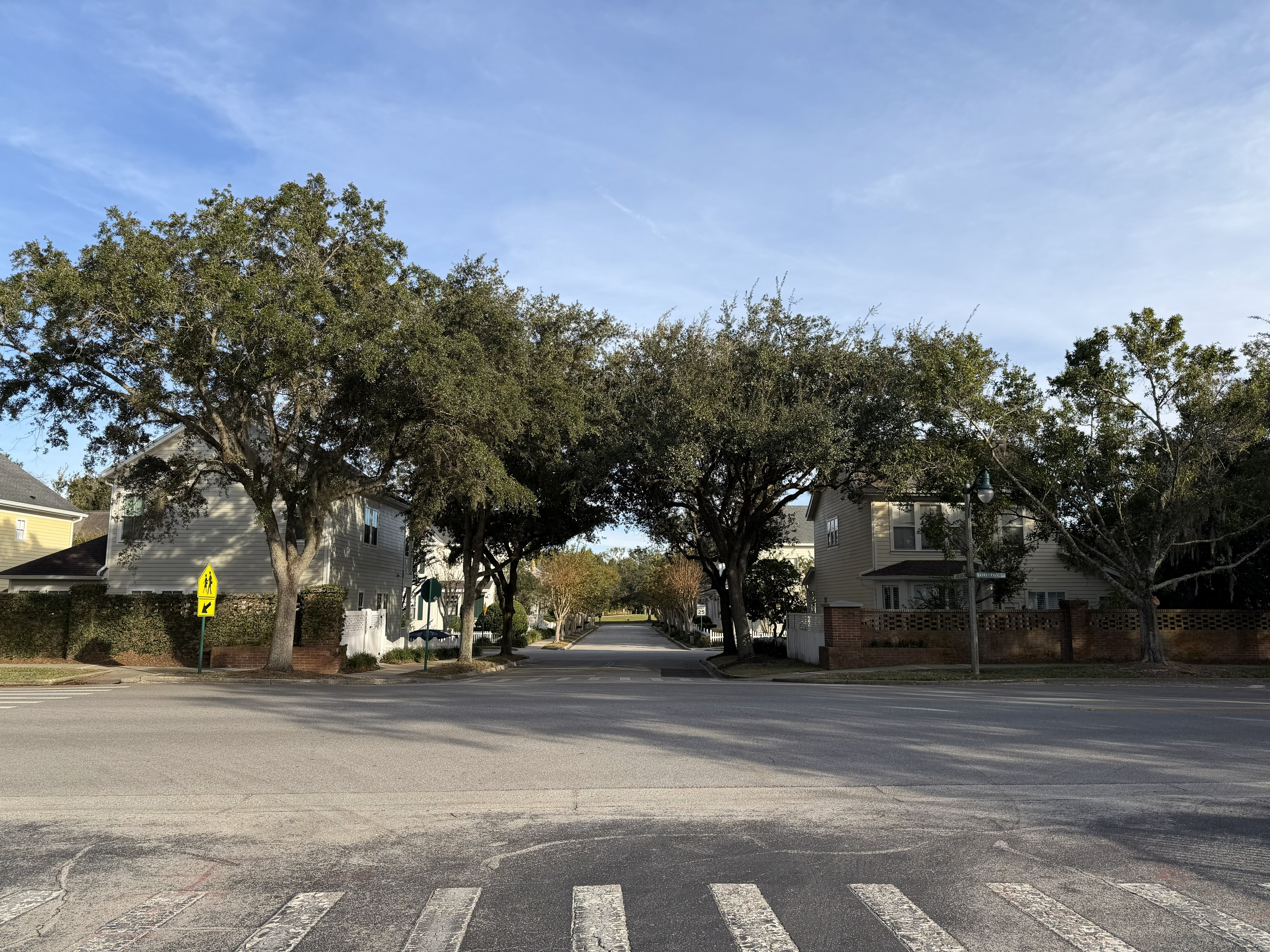
- Celebration residential street

- Location in Osceola County and the state of Florida

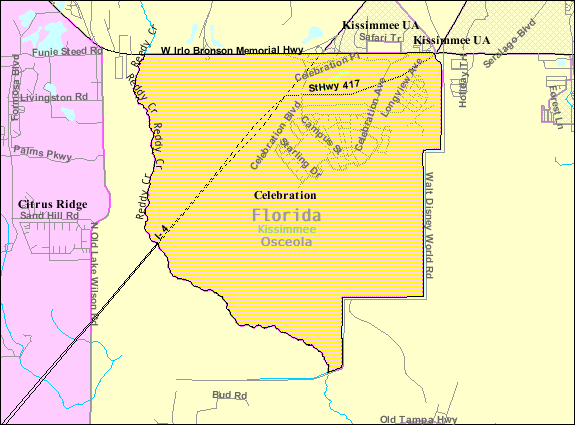
- U.S. census map
- Coordinates: 28°18′37″N 81°33′03″W
- Country: United States
- State: Florida
- County: Osceola
- Established: 1994

Area
  - Total: 10.58 sq mi (27.40 km^{2})
  - Land: 10.53 sq mi (27.26 km^{2})
  - Water: 0.054 sq mi (0.14 km^{2})
- Elevation: 85 ft (26 m)

Population (2020)
  - Total: 11,178
  - Density: 1,062.1/sq mi (410.06/km^{2})
- Time zone: UTC-5 (Eastern (EST))
  - Summer (DST): UTC-4 (EDT)
- ZIP code: 34747
- Area codes: 321 & 407, 689
- FIPS code: 12-11285
- GNIS feature ID: 2402754
- Website: www.celebration.fl.us

Celebration is a master-planned community (MPC) and census-designated place (CDP) in Osceola County, Florida, United States. A suburb of Orlando, Celebration is located near Walt Disney World Resort and was originally developed by the Walt Disney Company. Its population was recorded as 11,178 in the 2020 United States census.

After founding Celebration, Disney followed its plans to divest most of its control of the town. Several Disney business units continue to occupy the town's office buildings. The town itself is connected to the Walt Disney World resorts via one of its primary streets, World Drive, which begins near the Magic Kingdom.

Various New Classical architects participated in the design of buildings in Celebration. Downtown Celebration's post office was designed by Michael Graves, the adjacent Welcome Center by Philip Johnson, and the Celebration Health building by Robert A. M. Stern. Other well-known architects who have designed nearby buildings include Charles Moore (Preview Center), Graham Gund (Bohemian Hotel), Cesar Pelli (movie theater), and Robert Venturi and Denise Scott Brown (SunTrust Bank).

== History ==
=== Early development ===
In the early 1990s, the Disney Development Company (DDC) established the Celebration Company to spearhead its development within about 4,900 acres (20 km^{2}) of land in the southern portion of the Reedy Creek Improvement District. Total investment for the project is estimated at US$2.5 billion.

The master plan was developed by two Driehaus Prize winning architects, Jacquelin T. Robertson of Cooper, Robertson & Partners and Robert A. M. Stern. The extensive landscape, parks, trails and pathways were designed by the San Francisco firm EDAW (now AECOM). Urban Design Associates, of Pittsburgh, developed design guidelines, called an architectural pattern book, as a tool for the design of new architecture within the community. Celebration is planned in an early 20th-century architectural style and is not zoned for high-density residences. Celebration was named the "New Community of the Year" in 2001 by the Urban Land Institute. Disney hired graphic designer Michael Bierut to design community elements including street signs, retail signage, manhole covers, fountains, golf course graphics, park trail markers, as well as home sales brochures.

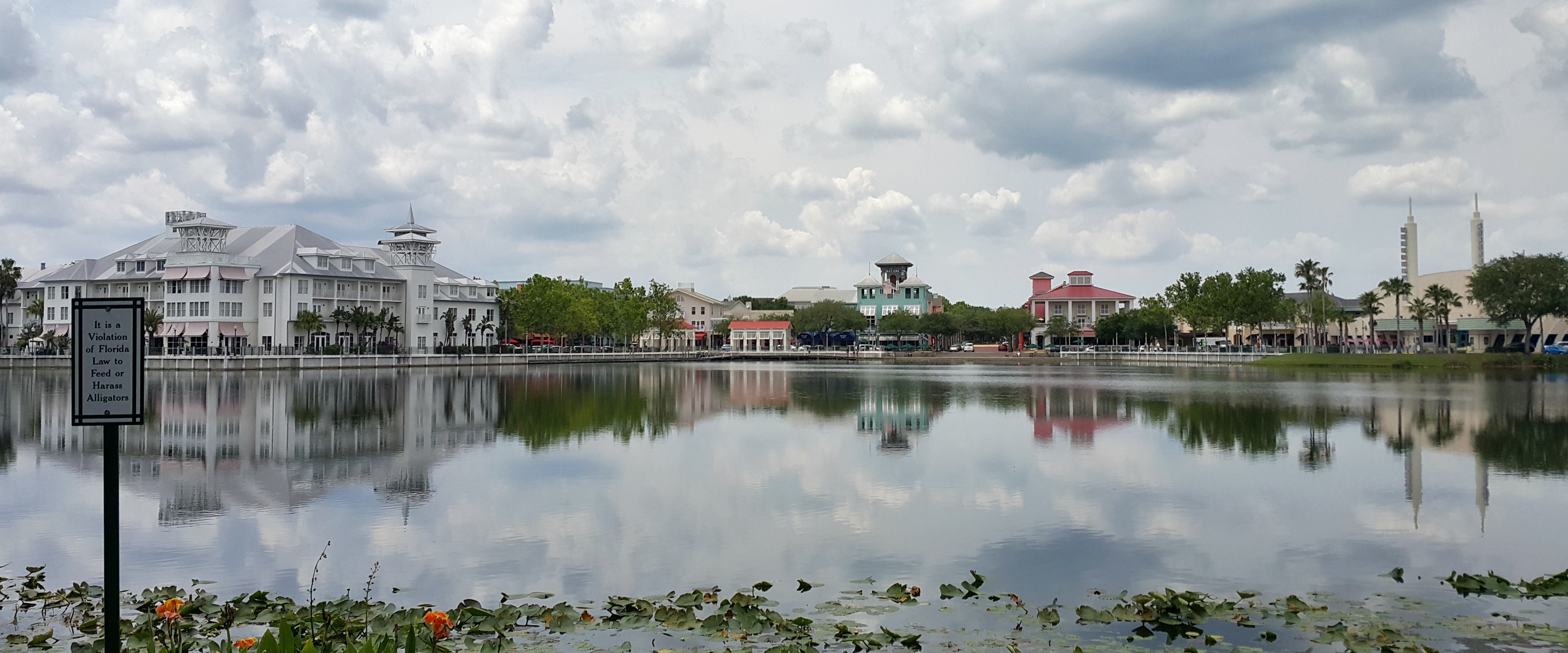
View of downtown Celebration over Lake Rianhard

The first phase of residential development occurred in the summer of 1996 with Celebration Village, West Village, and Lake Evalyn; this was followed by the North Village, South Village, East Village and Aquila Reserve and the final Artisan Park phases. Later phases included construction by a number of developers, including David Waronker.

Disney CEO Michael Eisner took an especially keen interest in the development of the new town in the early days, encouraging the executives at Disney Development Company to "make history" and develop a town worthy of the Disney brand and legacy that extended to Walt Disney's vision of an Experimental Prototype Community of Tomorrow (EPCOT). DDC executives collaborated extensively with leaders in education, health, and technology in addition to planners and architects to create the vision and operating policies for the town.

There were a series of car accidents involving a retention pond adjacent to World Drive which required the addition of more safety structures.

Disney attempted numerous efforts to encourage economic and ethnic diversity among residents in the early days of development. The company placed advertisements in newspapers and magazines that catered to African-American and Hispanic demographics, printed brochures featuring racial minorities, and hired African-American workers in the community's sales office. In addition, the owners of the first 350 houses and 123 apartments were chosen by a lottery in an effort to prevent racial discrimination against homebuyers. However, by 2000, it was revealed that the racial makeup of the community was 88% white, compared to the surrounding county's 59% white population. Demographers partially blamed the lack of diversity on Disney's decision to forego building subsidized housing inside the community, instead opting to donate $900,000 to Osceola County to help area residents buy houses under $80,000, below the market value of most housing in Celebration.

=== Civil suit ===
In 2016, The Wall Street Journal reported that Celebration Town Center condominium owners "are battling leaky roofs, balconies that have become separated from the sides of buildings and mold spreading in their walls. Their properties have become so dilapidated, they say, they're having trouble selling them."

An April 2016 civil suit seeks to force the Town Center Foundation, a controlling entity under sole direction of Lexin Capital, "which took control of part of Celebration in 2004, to pay for upward of $15 million to $20 million in repairs" which were deferred over ten years.

== Geography ==
According to the United States Census Bureau, the CDP has a total area of 10.7 square miles (28 km^{2}), of which 0.04 square miles (0.10 km^{2}), or 0.28%, is water. Celebration sits within USPS ZIP code 34747, sometimes known as Kissimmee: this is due to the city being unincorporated, as Celebration is not a subdivision and is still considered an unincorporated town.

In addition to the town center and luxury houses, the Celebration Nature Trails offer a high degree of walkability to the area. Celebration has over 23 miles (37 km) of nature trails connecting the entire neighborhood. The nature trails provide access to scenery and wildlife, and are accessible on foot or by bike.

== Demographics ==
Historical population
Census	Pop.	Note	%±
2000	2,736		—
2010	7,427		171.5%
2020	11,178		50.5%
U.S. Decennial Census

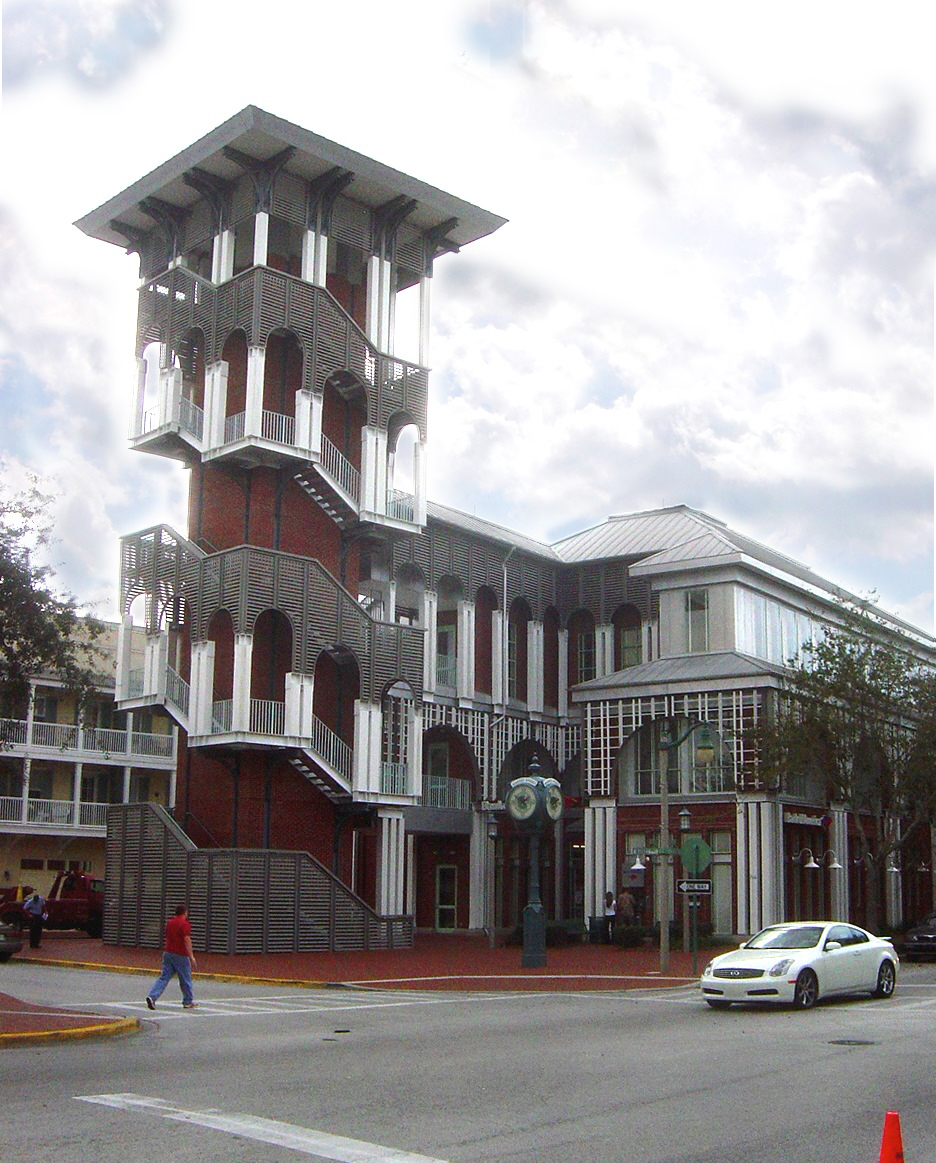
Bank of America building, downtown Celebration

=== 2020 census ===
As of the 2020 census, Celebration had a population of 11,178. The median age was 43.0 years. 20.0% of residents were under the age of 18 and 18.5% of residents were 65 years of age or older. For every 100 females there were 90.9 males, and for every 100 females age 18 and over there were 88.4 males age 18 and over.

99.1% of residents lived in urban areas, while 0.9% lived in rural areas.

There were 4,617 households in Celebration, of which 29.0% had children under the age of 18 living in them. Of all households, 53.9% were married-couple households, 14.9% were households with a male householder and no spouse or partner present, and 25.3% were households with a female householder and no spouse or partner present. About 25.6% of all households were made up of individuals and 8.2% had someone living alone who was 65 years of age or older.

There were 6,113 housing units, of which 24.5% were vacant. The homeowner vacancy rate was 3.0% and the rental vacancy rate was 18.5%.

Racial composition as of the 2020 census
Race	Number	Percent
White	8,254	73.8%
Black or African American	161	1.4%
American Indian and Alaska Native	23	0.2%
Asian	500	4.5%
Native Hawaiian and Other Pacific Islander	5	0.0%
Some other race	432	3.9%
Two or more races	1,803	16.1%
Hispanic or Latino (of any race)	1,705	15.3%

=== 2010 census ===
As of the census of 2010, there were 7,427 people, 3,063 households, and 716 families residing in the CDP. The population density was 704.9 people per square mile (272.2 people/km^{2}). There were 4,566 housing units at an average density of 102.4 units per square mile (39.5 units/km^{2}). The racial makeup of the CDP was 91.0% white (with 81.9% of the population non-Hispanic white), 1.5% black, 3.2% Asian, 2.2% from two or more races and 0.26% Native American. Hispanics or Latinos of any race were 11.2% of the population.

There were 3,063 households, out of which 32.7% had children under the age of 18 living with them, 57.0% were married couples living together, 4.5% had a female householder with no married spouse present, and 35.0% were non-families. 24.3% of all households were made up of individuals, and 3.6% had someone living alone who was 65 years of age or older. The average household size was 2.44 and the average family size was 2.96.

The age distribution was 25.6% under the age of 18, and 9.2% who were 65 years of age or older. The median age was 37 years. For every 100 females, there were 94.7 males. For every 100 females age 18 and over, there were 93.5 males in that age range.

=== Income and poverty ===
The median income for a household in the CDP was $74,231, and the median income for a family was $92,334. Males had a median income of $51,250 versus $46,650 for females. The per-capita income for the CDP was $39,521, and 4.1% of the population lived below the poverty line.

== Government ==
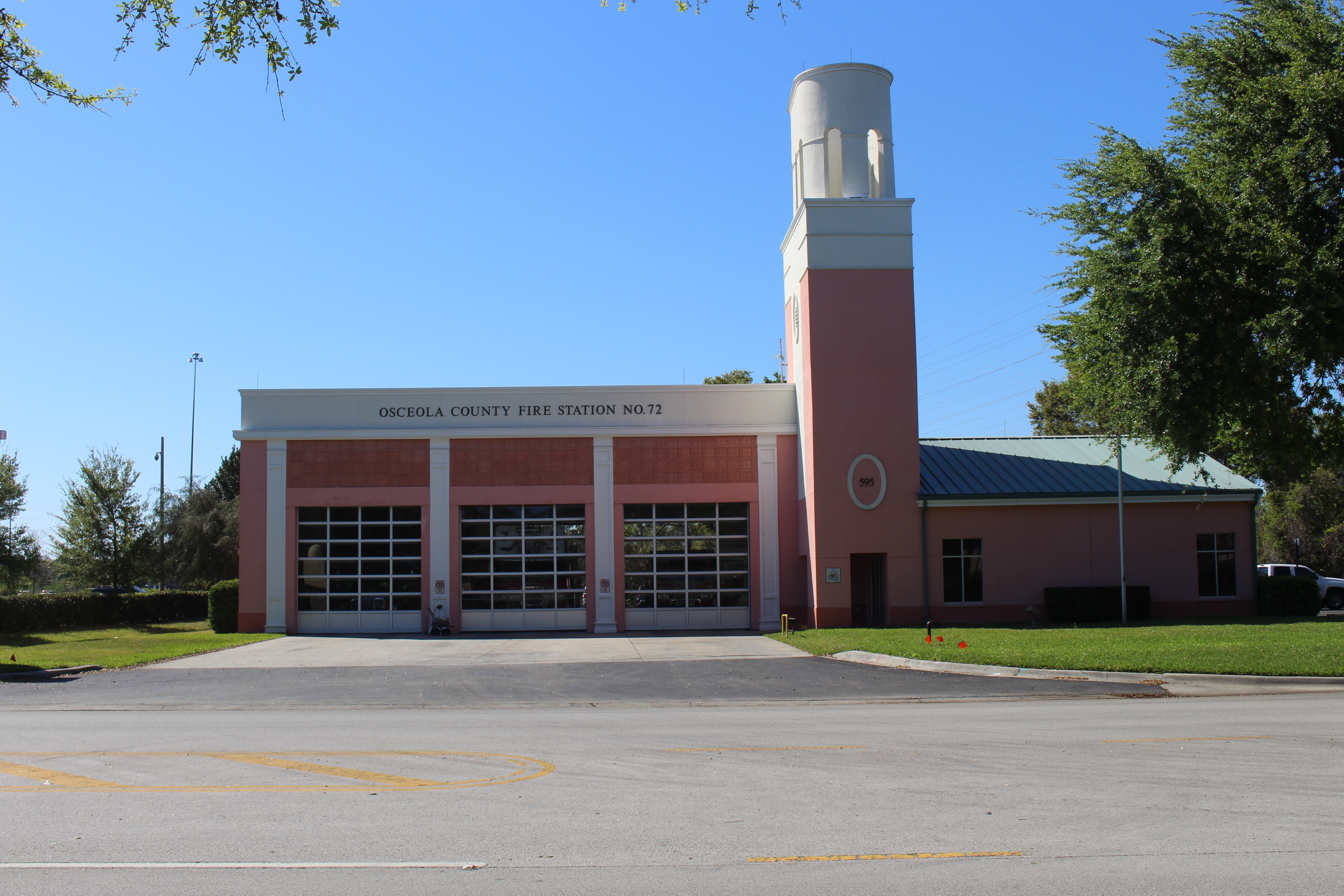
Osceola County Fire Station #72

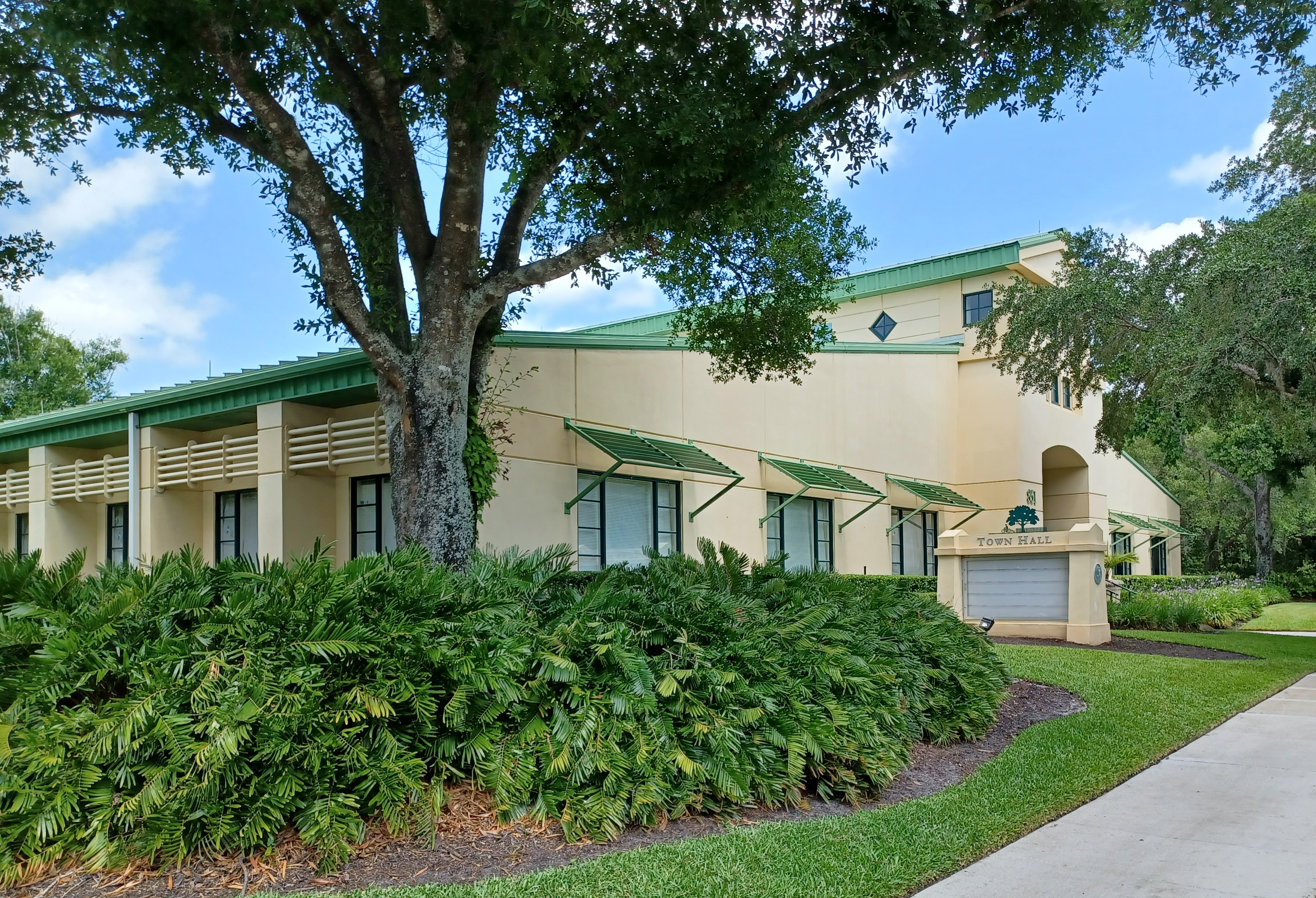
Town Hall

The area is organized under state law as a community development district (or CDD), which has a five-member elected Board of Supervisors. The CDD deals with major the infrastructural requirements of the area such as street lighting, public parks and pest control. Two owners' associations, the Celebration Residential Owners Association (CROA) and the Celebration Non-Residential Owners Association (CNOA) represent residents and commercial landowners, with a joint committee (CJC) composed of representatives of both the CROA and the CNOA. Services for residents, building repair, security and environmental improvements are organized and overseen by these bodies. The largest landowners are entities controlled by the Walt Disney Company.

Enterprise Community Development District is a distinct state law CDD also based in Celebration.

Celebration is entirely within Florida's 9th congressional district and is represented by Democrat Darren Soto in the U.S. House of Representatives. In the legislature, Celebration is represented by Democrat Kristen Arrington in the State Senate and Republican Carolina Amesty in the State House of Representatives.

For decades Celebration was very politically conservative.

== City life ==
=== Downtown ===
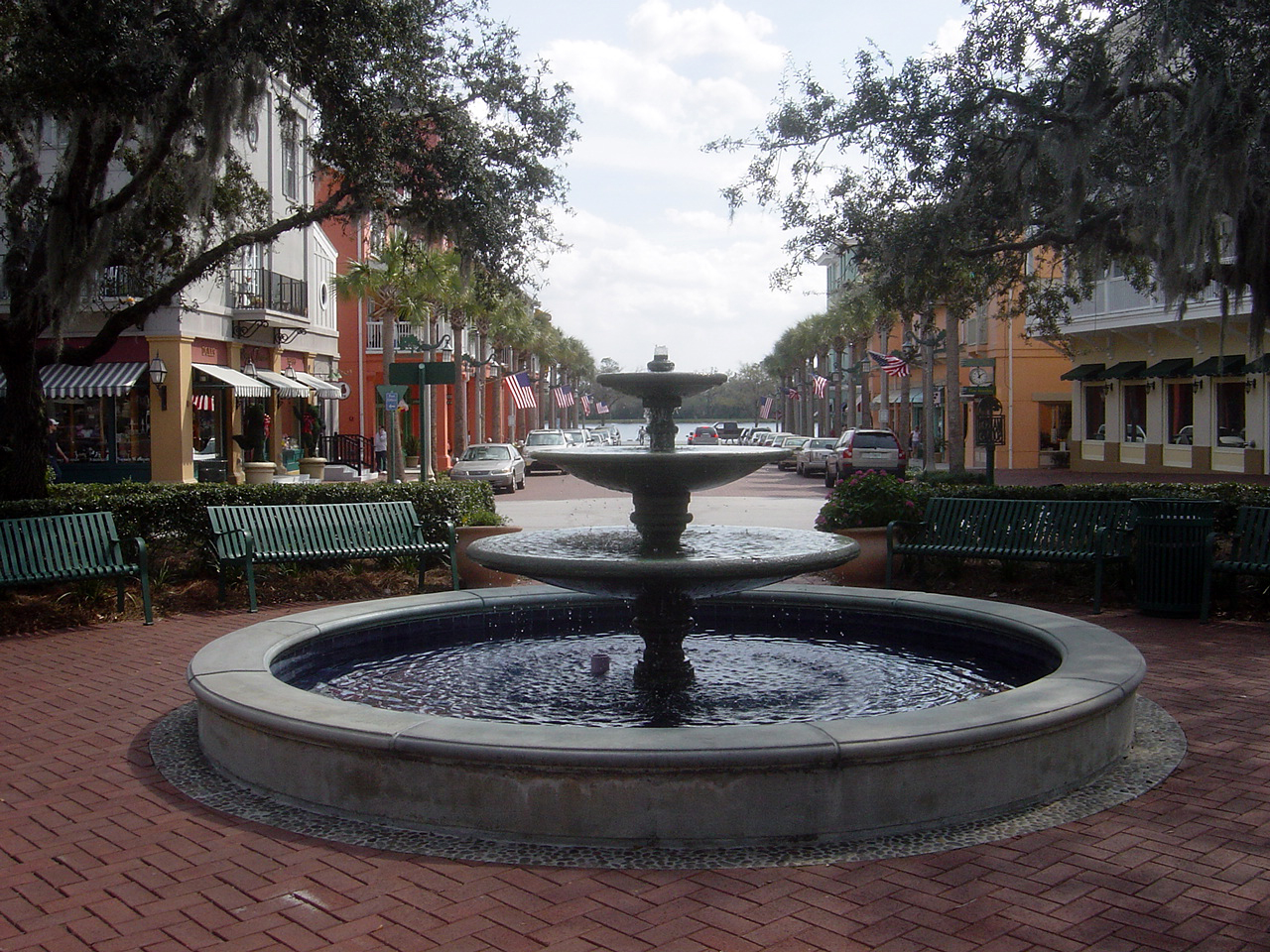
A view of downtown Market Street.

Celebration Town Center contains shops, restaurants, and other commercial establishments, as well as 106 residences.

=== Worship ===
Celebration has six Christian churches, one Jewish congregation, and one hospital ministry. Corpus Christi Catholic Church and the Community Presbyterian Church are both located on Celebration Avenue.

=== Commerce ===
There are now more than 500 registered companies listed as doing business in the shopping plazas, small office complexes, and the Disney World office building park. This community holds the only Class A office buildings in Osceola County.

=== Villages ===
Celebration is separated into areas referred to as "villages". The main village, closest to downtown, is where the first homes were constructed. North Village, closest to US-192, houses the Georgetown Condos as well as Acadia Estate Homes. East Village includes Roseville Corner and Aquila Loop. Lake Evalyn, generally considered its own area of Celebration but not quite its own village, includes a small lake where one can find a multitude of ducks, alligators, and the occasional river otter. South Village houses the Spring Park Loop estate homes and Heritage Hall. Additionally, Siena Condos complete the outer edge of South Village by Celebration Blvd. Mirasol includes condos with concierge service and a day spa. Artisan Park is at the end of Celebration Ave and houses condos, townhomes, single-family residences as well as a clubhouse consisting of a pool, gym, and restaurant.

=== Events ===
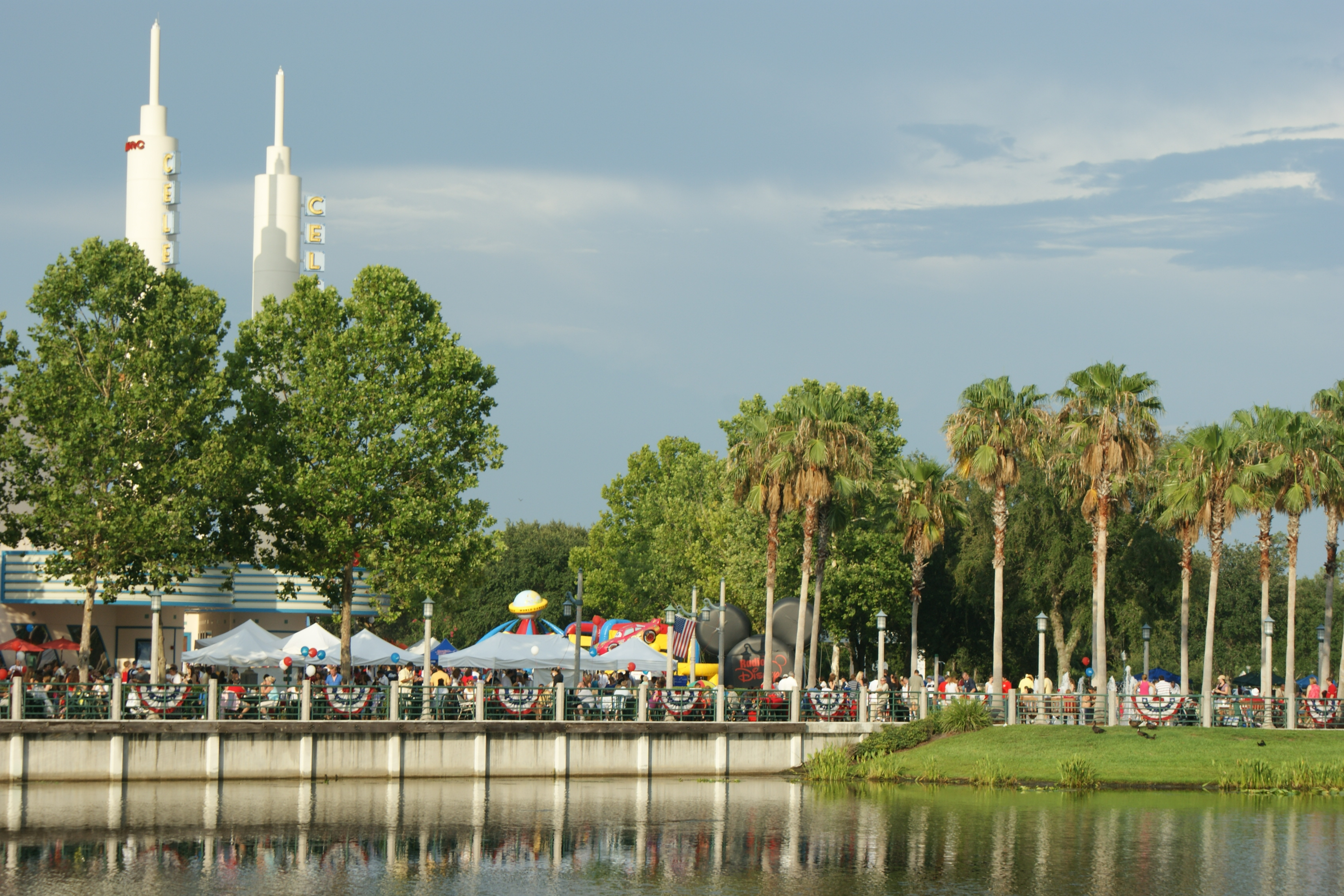
A gathering in Celebration on Independence Day

Celebration hosts many celebrations every year, including community-wide yard sales, an art show, an exotic car festival, an annual Radio Disney Holiday concert, an Oktoberfest Celebration, the "Great American Pie Festival" (televised on the Food Network), a "Posh Pooch" festival, and downtown events for the Fall and Christmas seasons when autumn leaves and "snow" (small-scale soap flakes) are released into the Town Center. The community also hosts a large Independence Day fireworks celebration. The town events are organized on the Internet by the Community Calendar.

== Education ==
=== Public ===
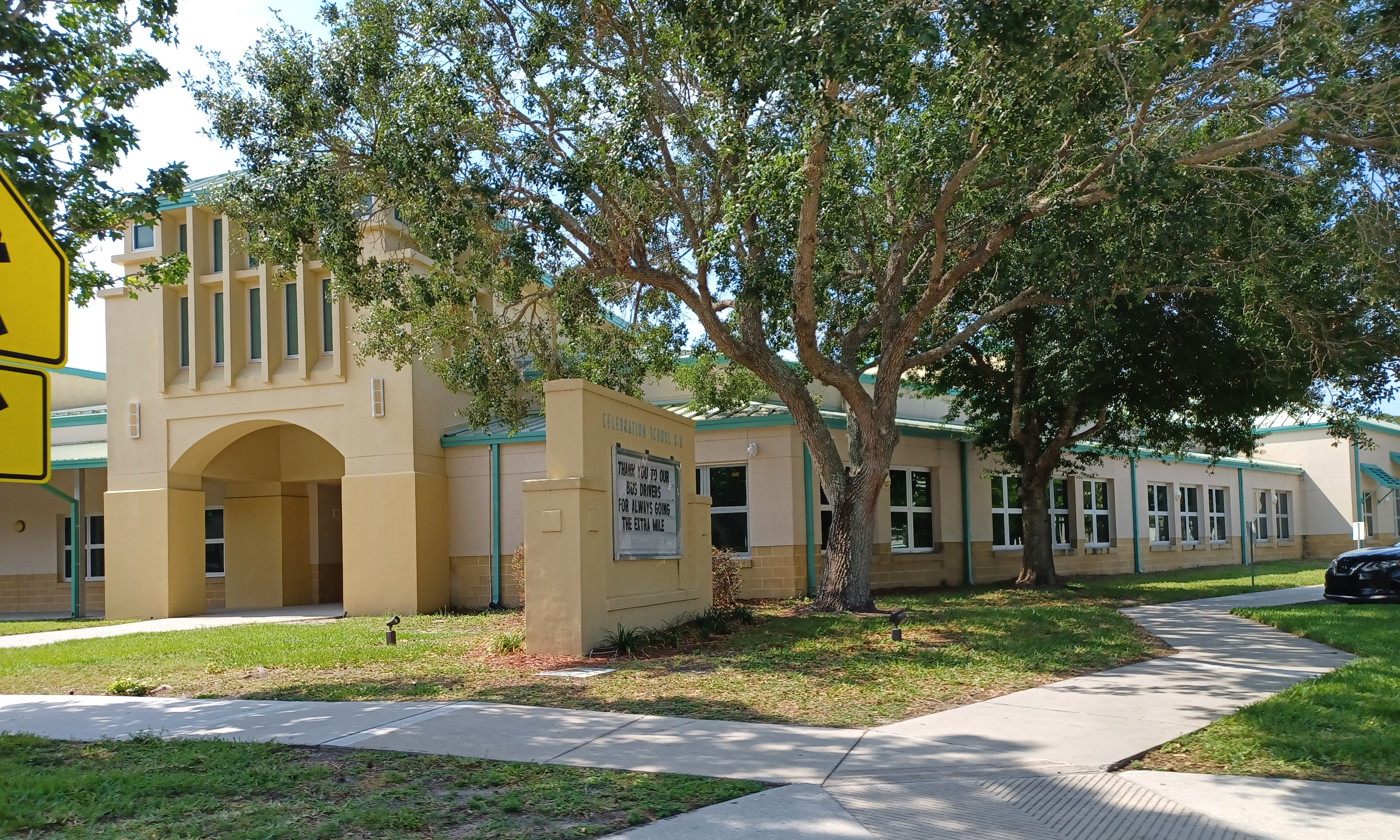
Celebration School

The School District of Osceola County, Florida, operates public schools in Celebration. Celebration is zoned to the Celebration School for K-8. Celebration High School, located in the city, serves Celebration for grades 9–12.

There are free classes offered at the community center by clubs for cooking, gardening, art, writing, and technology.

=== Private ===
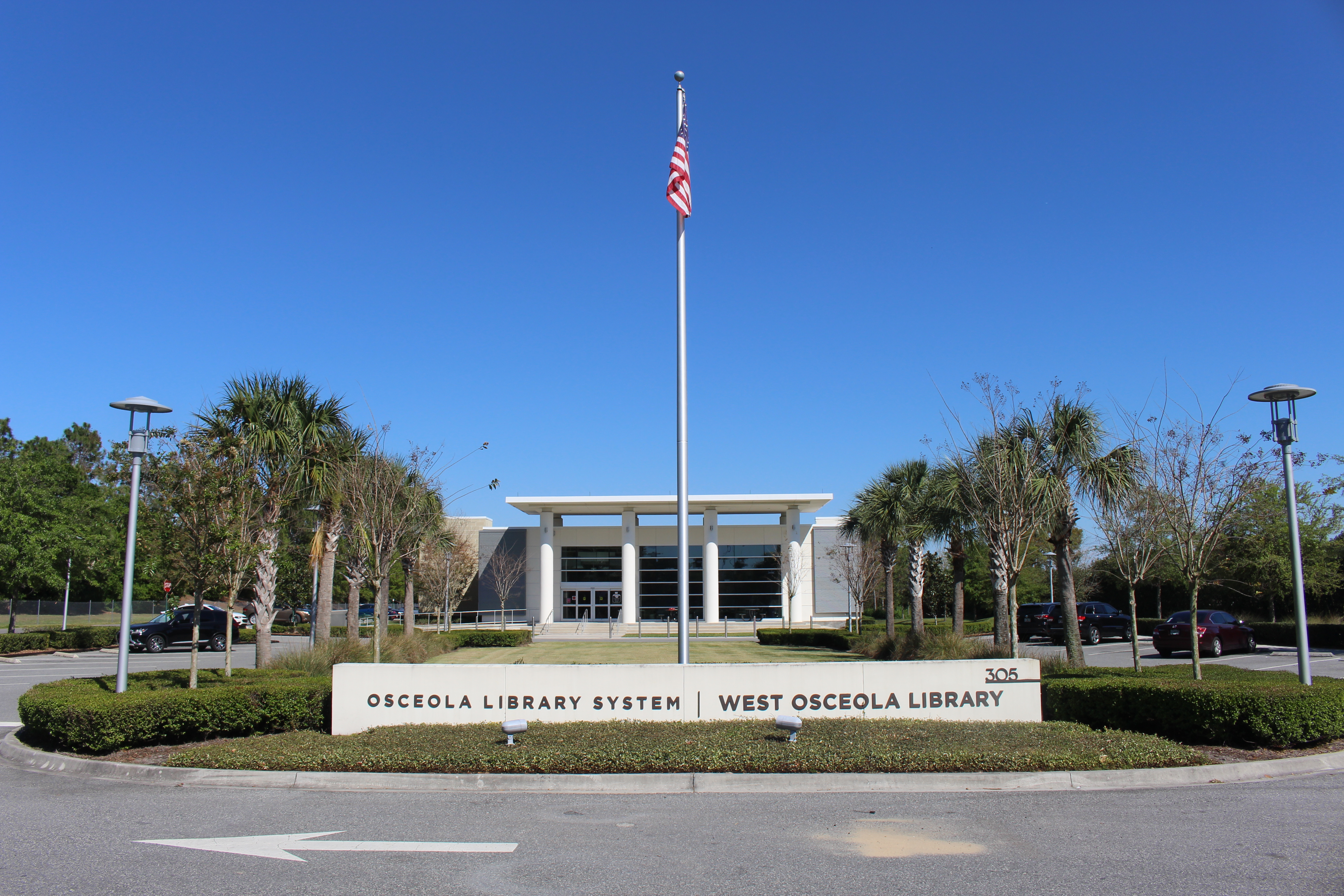
West Osceola Branch Library

There are private education options such as the Montessori Academy of Celebration, Creation Kids Village IB Diploma Programme School, and more.

Private graduate education was once offered at Stetson University Celebration Campus. The Stetson Celebration campus was sold in 2018 with plans to convert it into offices. It was purchased again in 2021 with intent to open a medical school in the building.

=== Library ===
The Osceola Library System operates the West Osceola Branch Library in Celebration.

== Infrastructure ==
=== Transportation ===
In 2011, 91% of residents who work outside their homes drove to work.

The two main roads going through the center of the Celebration's downtown area are Market Street and Front Street. Other streets in Celebration include:

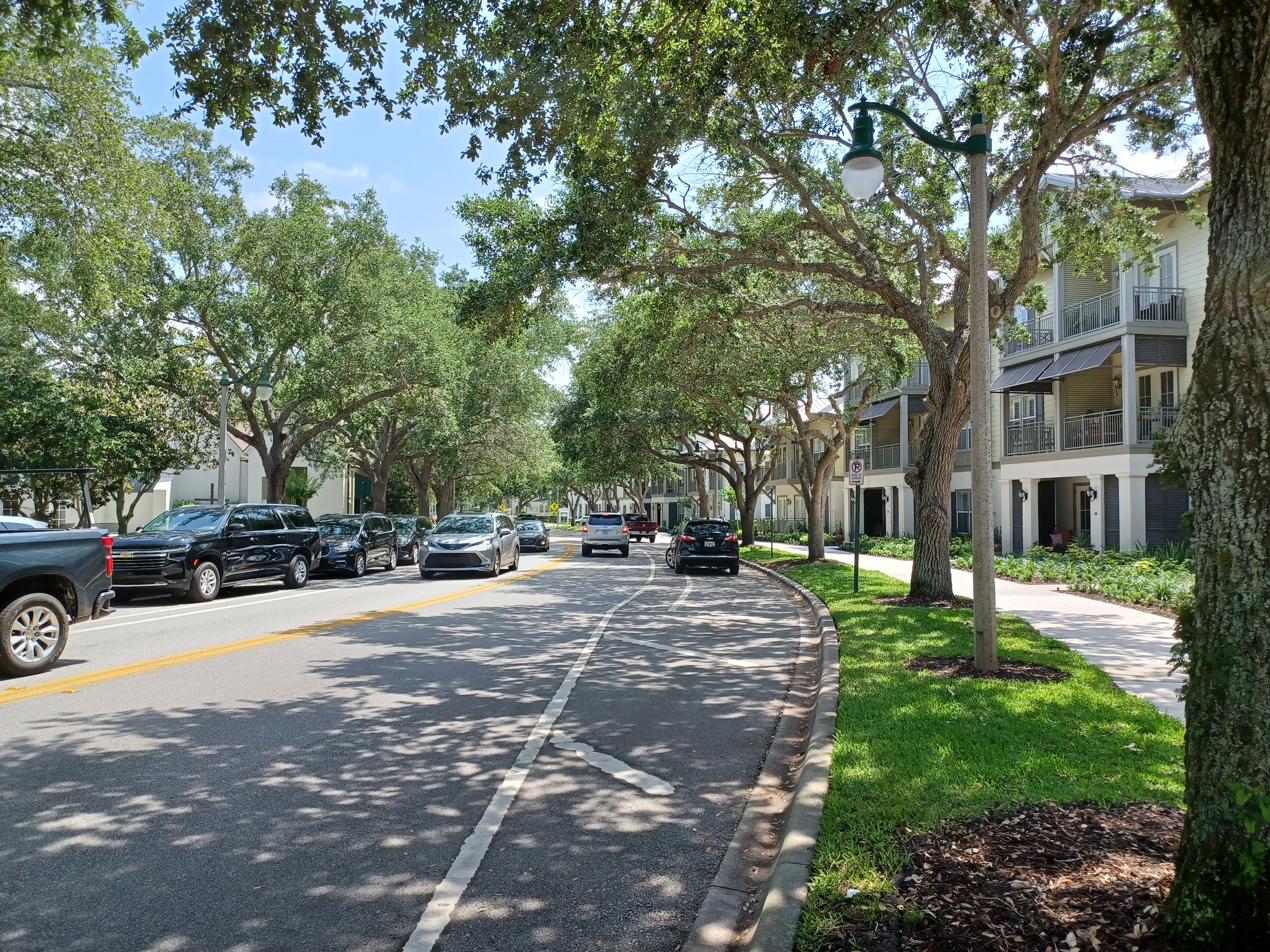
Celebration Avenue

Celebration Avenue
This is considered the main road in the town. The road stretches from U.S. 192 to Artisan Park where it ends in a traffic circle. Starting from U.S. 192 near the Disney Parks and the Celebration water tower, one can find a small shopping plaza. From there, Celebration Avenue passes the North Village, splits the Celebration golf course, winds through a few down-town shops and schools, and then proceeds into the parks and homes in the newer sections of Celebration.
Celebration Boulevard
Celebration Boulevard has two sections. The most public section is an avenue parallel to I-4 that includes many commercial businesses and Celebration High School. The architecture on the street is mostly Celebration Modern style. This style reflects art Streamline Moderne and Art Deco influences with its sleek lines, sparse but effective ornamentation, and ample opportunities for individually expressive special features. The entire street is lined with two rows of Washington Palms. The buildings on the street include sitting areas under the shade of trees and trellises along their frontage. The other section of Celebration Boulevard lies on the other side of the golf course, closer to the Celebration Water Tower in the North Village. Here, Celebration Boulevard is almost completely residential. In addition to the homes perched behind white picket fences, this section of Celebration Boulevard flows past the Georgetown condominiums, the community pool, and soccer fields.
Celebration Place
Celebration Place nearly spans the gap between the two sections of Celebration Boulevard, except that its eastern end terminates at the Water Tower Plaza instead of at the entrance to North Village on the other side of State Road 417. Celebration Place is a commercial road.

=== Healthcare ===
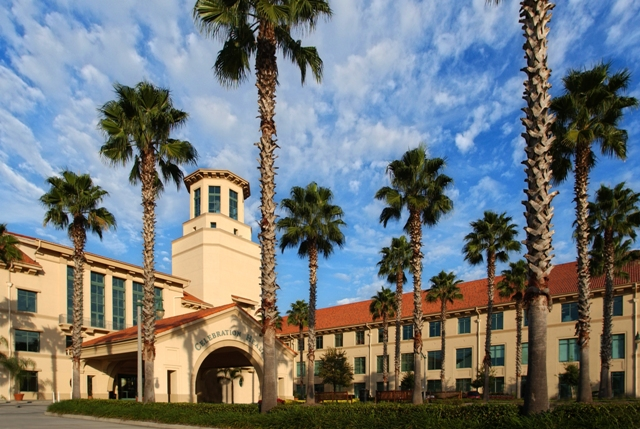
AdventHealth Celebration

The only hospital in Celebration is the non-profit hospital AdventHealth Celebration. The hospital is affiliated with AdventHealth Orlando. With its Mediterranean-style and proximity to Walt Disney World, the hospital attracts patients from around the world. In April 2024, AdventHealth announced it will add a 44,966-square-foot five story patient tower to the campus, with three operating rooms and 80 beds (increasing the number of hospital beds to 427). The hospital would be one of the largest hospitals in Osceola County.

== Notable residents ==
- Adam the Woo, YouTube travel vlogger
- Drake Bell, actor
- Pat Schroeder, former Congresswoman for Colorado

== See also ==
- EPCOT (concept)
- New Urbanism
- Golden Oak at Walt Disney World Resort – a similar concept high-end resort living community within the Walt Disney World Resort
- Baldwin Park, Florida - a similar mixed-use master-planned community that incorporates new urbanism, located in the city of Orlando, Orange County, Florida
- Val d'Europe – located around 35 km (22 mi) to the east of Paris, near Disneyland Paris. Val d'Europe was built in conjunction with the Walt Disney Company
- Seaside, Florida – a concept new urban resort living community in Walton County, Florida
- Lifestyle center
- Storyliving by Disney
- Todt family murders
