= Susan Zuccotti =

American historian (born 1940)

Susan Sessions Zuccotti (born November 14, 1940) is an American historian, specializing in studies of the Holocaust. She holds a PhD in Modern European History from Columbia University. She has won a National Jewish Book Award for Holocaust Studies, and the Premio Acqui Storia – Primo Lavoro for Italians and the Holocaust (1987). She also received a National Jewish Book Award for Jewish-Christian Relations, and the Sybil Halpern Milton Memorial Prize of the German Studies Association in 2002 for Under His Very Windows (2000). She was married to real estate developer John Zuccotti until his death in 2015.

Zuccotti has taught courses on Holocaust history at Barnard College and Trinity College.

== Work on Vatican's role in the Holocaust ==
Zuccotti argues in Under His Very Windows that Pope Pius XII knew of the mass murder of Jews during the Holocaust and could have done more to stop it.

== Books ==
- The Italians and the Holocaust: Persecution, Rescue and Survival (Nebraska: University of Nebraska Press, 1987)
- The Holocaust, the French, and the Jews (Nebraska: University of Nebraska Press,1993)
- Under His Very Windows: The Vatican and the Holocaust in Italy (New Haven: Yale University Press, 2000)
- Holocaust Odysseys: The Jews of Saint-Martin-Vésubie and Their Flight Through France and Italy (New Haven: Yale University Press, 2007)
- Pere Marie-Benoit and Jewish Rescue (Indiana: Indiana University Press, 2013)
