= Disney Development Company =

American company

The Disney Development Company (DDC) was a fully owned subsidiary of the Walt Disney Company, incorporated in Florida. Beginning in 1984, its primary role was in the master planning, design and construction of resort, commercial and business areas within the Walt Disney World Resort, and the development of the planned community, Celebration, Florida.

Completed Disney Development Company projects included but were not limited to:

- Disney's Grand Floridan Resort & Convention Center (WWAT&G, architect)
- The Crossroads of Lake Buena Vista (Hunton Brady & Associates, architect)
- Disney's AMC-10 Theaters, Disney's Caribbean Beach Resort
- Disney's Pleasure Island (Walt Disney Imagineering, architect)
- Disney's Casting Center (Robert AM Stern, architect)
- The WDW Swan Resort (Michael Graves, architect)
- The WDW Dolphin Resort (Michael Graves architect)
- Disney's Yacht & Beach Club Resorts (Robert AM Stern architect)
- Team Disney office building (Arata Isozaki, architect)
- Disney's Contemporary Resort Convention Center (Gwathmey Siegel, architect)
- Disney's Boardwalk Resort (Robert AM Stern, architect)
- Master Signage program
- Disney Vacation Club (in Lake Buena Vista, Hilton Head and Vero Beach)
- Disney's Port Orleans Resort
- Disney's Dixie Landings Resort
- Disney's Wilderness Lodge Resort (Peter Dominick, architect)
- Disney's Wide World of Sports
- Reedy Creek Improvement District (RCID) Fire Station
- Eagle Pines & Osprey Ridge golf courses & clubhouse
- Disney's Cruise Line and Cruise Line Terminal
- Disney's All-Star Resorts
- Fantasia Gardens Miniature Golf
- Disney's Winter Summerland Miniature Golf Course
- Disney's Fairytale Weddings pavilion, Celebration
- FL, Disney's Animal Kingdom Resort (Peter Dominick, architect)
- EuroDisney Resorts (architects included Graves, Stern, Gehry, Tigerman, Venturi & others) located east of Paris in Chessy, France.

In May 1996, the Disney Development Company merged with Walt Disney Imagineering to form a single entity.
