= Zuccotti Park =

Public park in Manhattan, New York

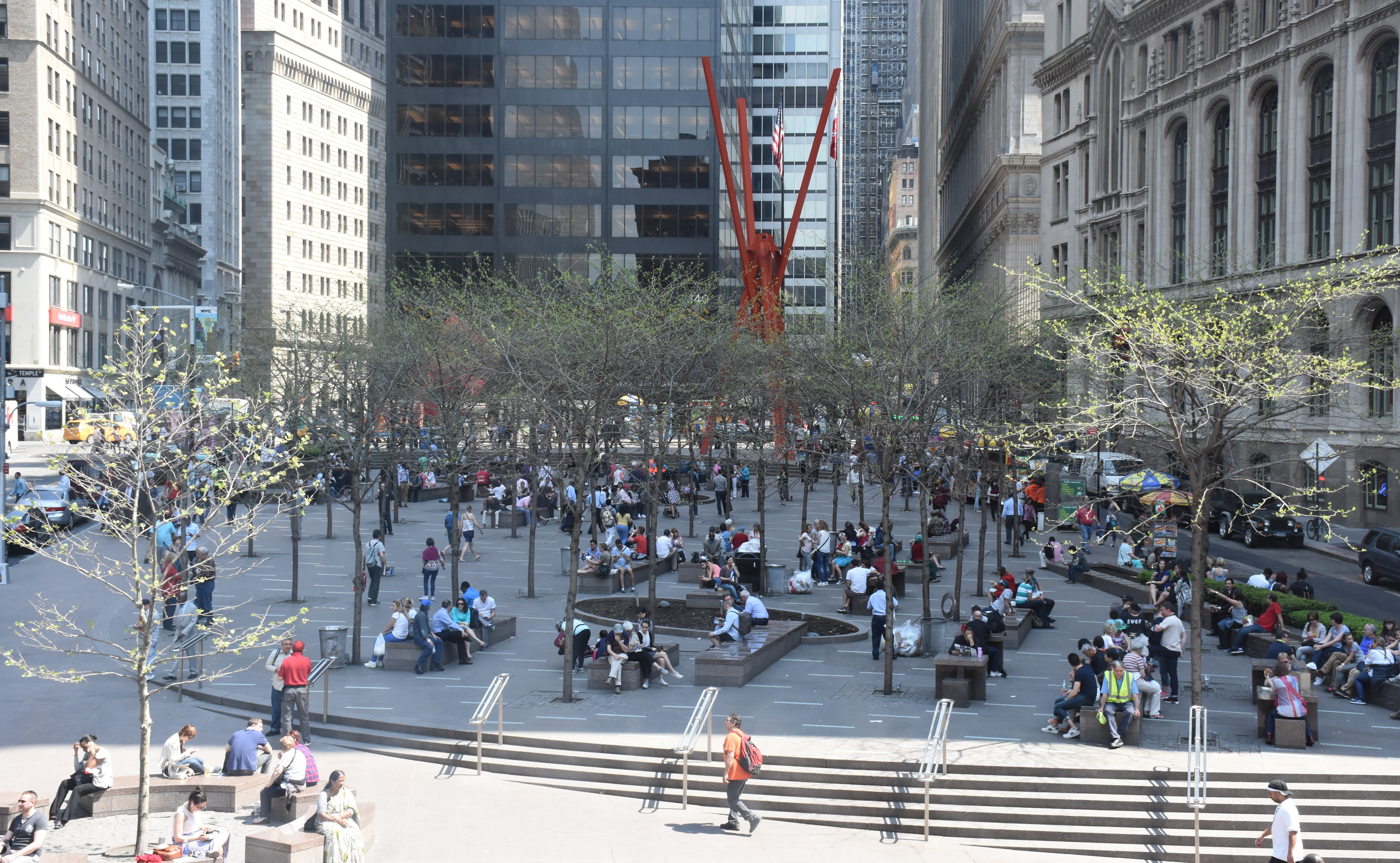
- Zuccotti Park in New York City in May 2015
- Interactive map of Zuccotti Park
- Type: Plaza
- Location: Financial District, Manhattan, New York City, U.S.
- Coordinates: 40°42′33″N 74°00′40″W
- Area: 33,000 square feet (3,100 m^{2})
- Created: 1968
- Etymology: John Eugene Zuccotti, Brookfield Properties CEO
- Operator: Brookfield Properties
- Status: Open all year

Zuccotti Park (formerly Liberty Plaza Park) is a 33,000-square-foot (3,100 m^{2}) publicly accessible park in the Financial District of Lower Manhattan in New York City. It is located in a privately owned public space (POPS) controlled by Brookfield Properties and Goldman Sachs. Zuccotti Park is bounded by Broadway to the east, Liberty Street to the north, Trinity Place to the west, and Cedar Street to the south.

The park was created in 1968 by Pittsburgh-based United States Steel, after the property owners negotiated its creation with city officials. It was named Liberty Plaza Park because it was situated one block south of One Liberty Plaza. The park's northwest corner is across the street from Four World Trade Center. It has been popular with local tourists and financial workers.

The park was heavily damaged in the September 11 attacks and subsequent recovery efforts of 2001. The plaza was later used as the site of several events commemorating the anniversary of the attacks. After renovations in 2006, the park was renamed by its current owners, Brookfield Properties, after company chairman John Zuccotti. Starting in September 2011, the plaza became the site of the Occupy Wall Street protest camp, during which activists occupied the plaza and used it as a staging ground for their protests throughout the Financial District; this was the first protest of what became the global Occupy movement.

== History ==
The site was the location of the first coffeehouse in colonial New York City, The King's Arms, which opened under the ownership of Lieutenant John Hutchins in 1696. It stood on the west side of Broadway between Crown (now Liberty) Street and Little Queen (now Cedar) Street. On November 5, 1773, summoned by the Sons of Liberty, a huge crowd assembled outside the coffee house to denounce the Tea Act and agents of the East India Trading Company who were handling cargoes of dutied tea. It was perhaps the first public demonstration in opposition to the Tea Act in the American colonies.

The park was created in 1968 or the early 1970s by Pittsburgh-based United States Steel, after the property owners negotiated its creation with city officials, in return for a height bonus for an adjacent building at the time of its construction. The structure, One Liberty Plaza, replaced the demolished Singer Building and City Investing Building.

The park is home to a signpost for Temple Street, a "ghost street" which appeared on Manhattan maps as early as 1695, but was redeveloped out of existence by the early 1970s.

=== September 11 attacks and renovation ===
The park was one of the few open spaces with tables and seats in the Financial District. Located one block from the World Trade Center, it was covered with debris, and subsequently used as a staging area for the recovery efforts after the destruction of the World Trade Center on September 11, 2001. As part of the Lower Manhattan rebuilding efforts, the park was regraded, trees were planted, and the tables and seating restored. Those who were working in the Zuccotti Park staging area of the recovery efforts, along with those who were living and working South of Houston Street in the months after the 9/11 attacks, have continued to develop cancers and other illnesses, for which they can seek compensation through the 9/11 Victim Compensation Fund.

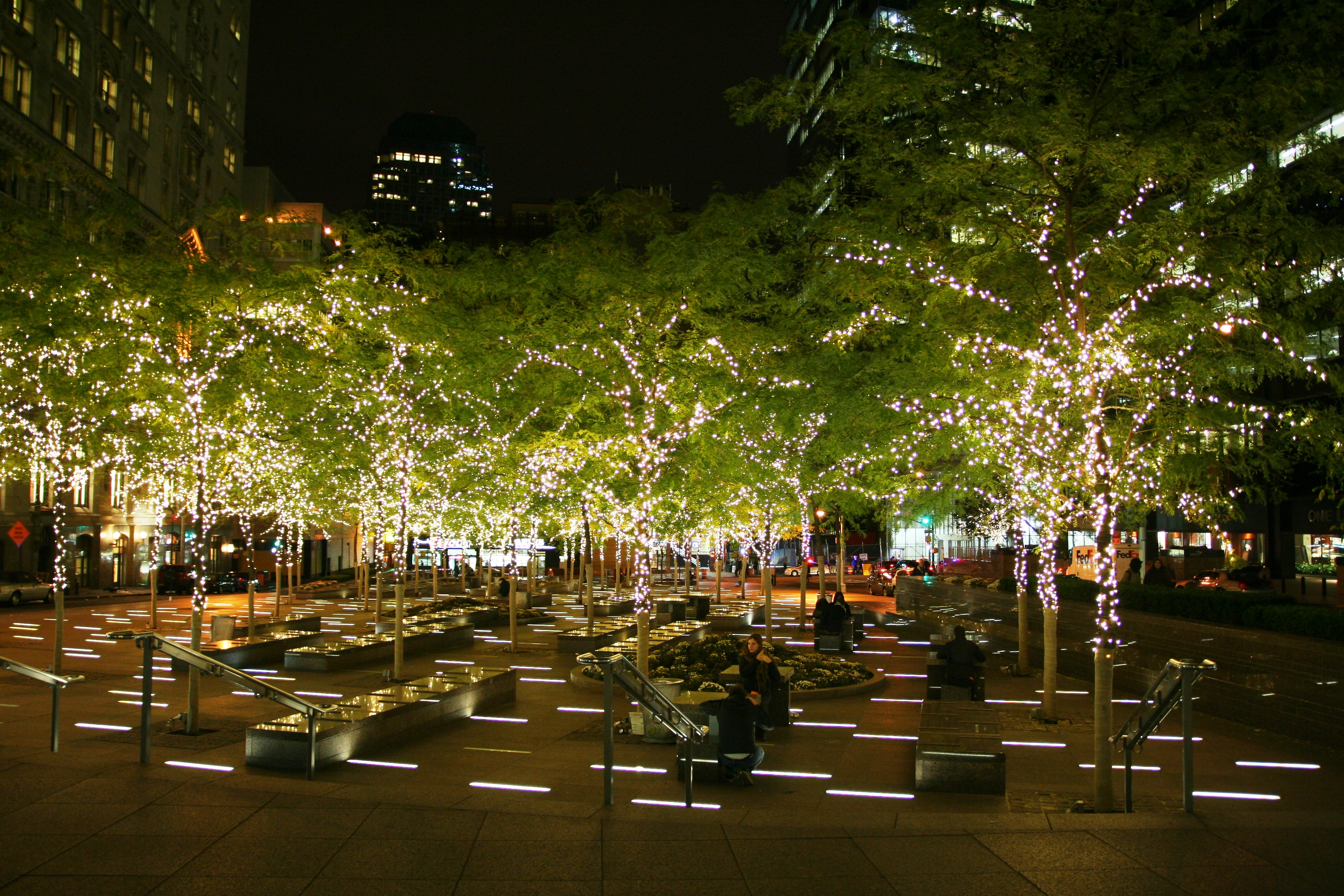
The park at night during the holiday season

On June 1, 2006, the park reopened after an $8 million renovation designed by Cooper, Robertson & Partners. It was renamed Zuccotti Park in honor of John E. Zuccotti, former City Planning Commission chairman and first deputy mayor under Abe Beame and the then-chairman of Brookfield Properties, which used private money to renovate the park. Currently, the park has a wide variety of trees, granite sidewalks, tables and seats, as well as lights built into the ground, which illuminate the area. With its proximity to Ground Zero, Zuccotti Park is a popular tourist destination. The World Trade Center cross, which was previously housed at St. Peter's Roman Catholic Church, was featured in a ceremony held in Zuccotti Park before it was moved to the 9/11 Memorial. The park won the 2008 American Institute of Architects Honor Award for Regional and Urban Design and was featured in Architectural Record and International New Architecture magazines.

=== Occupy Wall Street ===
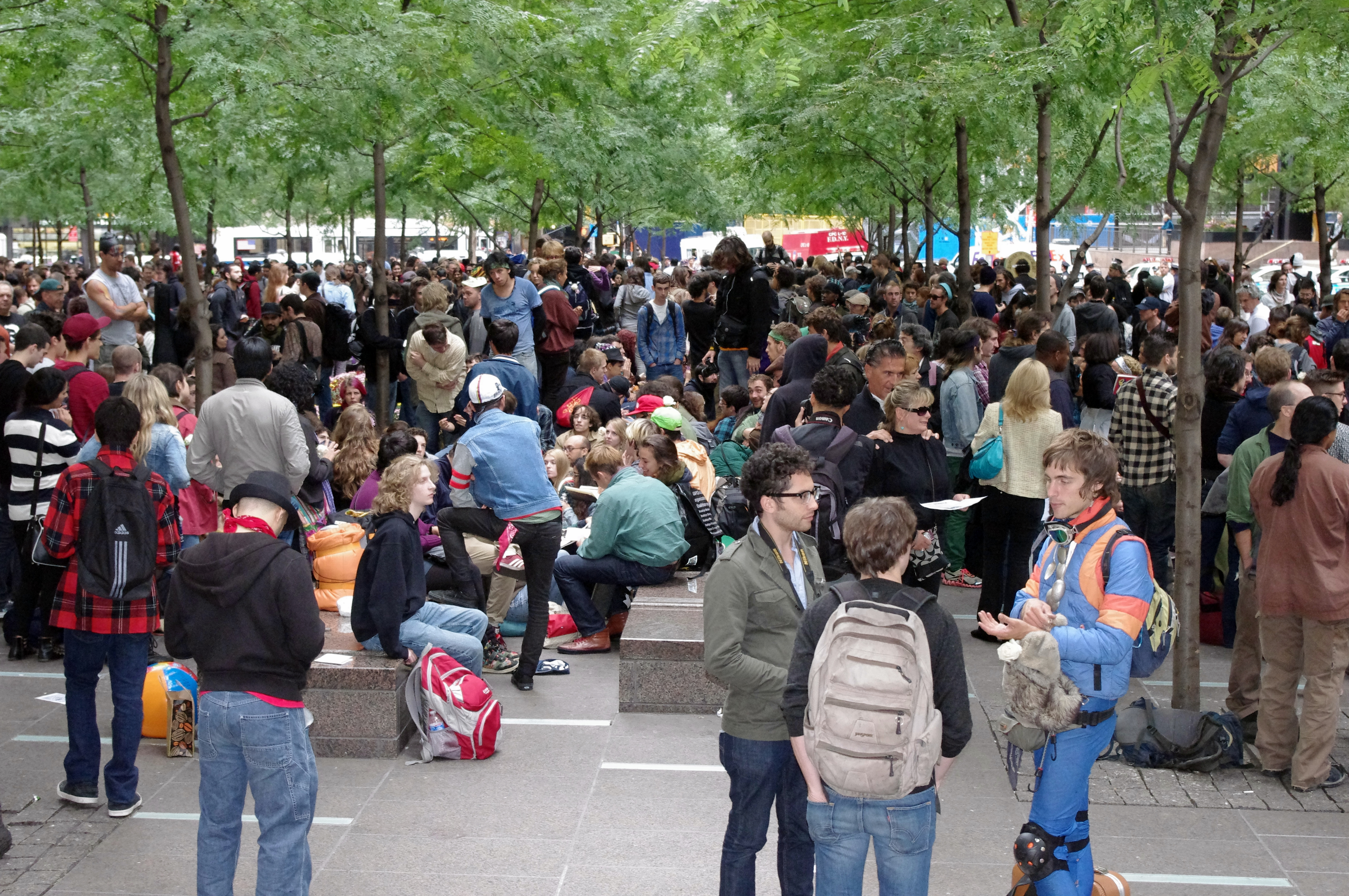
Beginning on September 17, 2011, Zuccotti Park was occupied by protesters during Occupy Wall Street

During the Occupy Wall Street movement, many protesters inhabited Zuccotti Park and spent their days and nights there, despite park rules prohibiting staying overnight. Attempts were made by the NYPD to disperse the protesters, but not until November 15, 2011, were they substantially evicted. At that time, police officers lit up the area with floodlights and began to clear out the park. Tents, tarps, and other forms of shelters were immediately removed, but protesters began to resist being driven out of the park. This led to the pepper-spraying and detainment of some protesters. After the park was reopened to the public, it was made known that protesters were still permitted to exercise their civil rights, but that this did not include sleeping and camping out at the park. Some protesters attempted to remain at the site after this, which led to continuing conflict with the police. After the complete eviction of the protesters from the park, they rallied again and attempted to take over other locations.

== Sculptures ==
The park is home to two sculptures. Joie de Vivre by Mark di Suvero, a 70-foot-tall sculpture consisting of bright-red beams, was installed in Zuccotti Park in 2006, having been moved from its previous installation in the Storm King Art Center. Benjamin Genocchio, an Australian then-New York-based art critic, commented that the sculpture suited the location, "nicely echoing the skyscrapers around it." The other sculpture is Double Check, depicting a bronze businessman sitting on a bench, by John Seward Johnson II. The park formerly had a third sculpture: Rose III by Isa Genzken, installed in 2018 at the northwest corner of the park.

== See also ==
- List of privately owned public spaces in New York City
- Occupation of Alcatraz
- People's Park (Berkeley)
