= Hirschfelder =

Hirschfelder is a German surname. Notable people with the surname include:

- David Hirschfelder (born 1960), Australian musician and film score composer
- Egbert Hirschfelder (1942–2022), German rower
- Gerhard Hirschfelder (1907–1942), German Catholic priest and martyr
- Joseph O. Hirschfelder (1911–1990), American physicist
