= Secular Institute of Schoenstatt Fathers =

Religious priestly institute of the Catholic Church

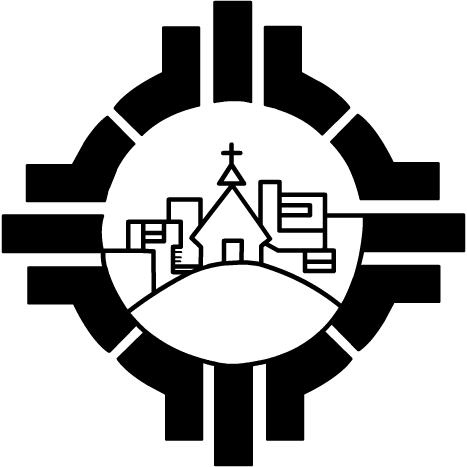
- Abbreviation: ISch
- Nickname: Schoenstatt Fathers
- Founder: Josef Kentenich
- Founded at: Schönstatt (Vallendar), Germany
- Headquarters: Berg Sion 1 - Vaterhaus, 56337 Simmern, Germany
- Coordinates: 50°23′51.1362″N 7°39′9.7812″E
- General Superior: Alexandre Awi Mello
- Parent organization: Catholic Church
- Website: http://www.schoenstatt-fathers.org

The Secular Institute of Schoenstatt Fathers (ISch) is a Catholic religious institute founded by the German Pallottine priest Josef Kentenich, as a part of the Schoenstatt Movement. It was canonically erected on 18 July 1965. It is a secular institute of pontifical right.

== History ==
The Schoenstatt Movement arose at the beginning of the 20th century in the Pallottine Seminary in a place named Schönstatt (Vallendar). It initially consisted mainly of Pallottine students (seminarians). The Pallottine Fathers and the Schoenstatt Movement remained closely connected for almost 50 years. Pallottine Fathers held spiritual functions in the Schoenstatt Movement. However, in the 1940s and 1950s tensions arose between Schoenstatt and the Pallottines, which finally led to the legal separation of the Schoenstatt Work from the Pallottines in 1964, as decided by Vatican authorities. As a result, the following year the Dicastery for Institutes of Consecrated Life and Societies of Apostolic Life established the Secular Institute of Schoenstatt Fathers for the priestly service of the Movement.

The Institute was international and multicultural from its beginning, as groups of former Pallottines from Latin America, the USA, Australia, South Africa and several European countries joined the newly founded community. Soon young men from different countries applied to be admitted to the Institute and began their formation in Münster, Germany in the late 1960s. In the 1990s, further formation houses were created in South America (Paraguay, Chile), India (Karnataka, Kerala, Tamil Nadu) and Africa (Burundi, Nigeria), as the number of vocations rose.

When the Schoenstatt Sisters of Mary (de) moved their generalate to Mount Schoenstatt in Vallendar, Germany in 1967, the Schoenstatt Fathers took over their former house called "Haus Sonneck" as the seat of the generalate. In 1992 the Schoenstatt Fathers' generalate moved into the newly built house on Mount Sion(Vallendar, Germany).

== Spirituality ==
Schoenstatt Fathers live their priesthood in the spirit of the founder Josef Kentenich, who was himself a priest. The nucleus of their spirituality has two main aspects: a covenant of love with Mary, the mother of Christ, and an ongoing search for the guidance of God in their lives ("practical faith in Divine Providence"). Furthermore, the founder has given the Schoenstatt Fathers a biblical image as their main source of identity: Mount Sion ("It is thus the seat of the action of Yahweh in history."), the place where the historical jewish main temple was built in Jerusalem, meaning that Schoenstatt Fathers aspire to be persons who help others to experience the presence and the action of God in their lives.

== Organization ==
As of July 2022, the institute is divided into a total number of 12 provinces, regions and delegations. It has 444 members in 21 countries: Austria, Czech Republic, Germany, Italy, Poland, Portugal, Spain, Switzerland, United Kingdom, Costa Rica, Mexico, United States, Argentina, Brazil, Chile, Ecuador, Paraguay, Burundi, Democratic Republic of Congo, Nigeria and India. Currently, there are 4 bishops, 377 priests, 2 deacons and 61 professed brothers (candidates for priesthood) in the institute. Additionally, there are 38 novices in the first stage of formation towards priesthood. Some of the most prominent members are the Chilean Cardinal emeritus Francisco Javier Errázuriz Ossa; Fr Alexandre Awi Mello, Secretary of the Dicastery for the Laity, Family and Life from 2017 to 2022 and advisor to the Pontifical Commission for Latin America; the Bishop of the Roman Catholic Diocese of Encarnación, Paraguay, Francisco Javier Pistilli Scorzara, Bishop emeritus Manuel Vial, Fr Déogratias Maruhukiru, the founder of Rapred-Girubuntu - African Network for Peace, Reconciliation and Sustainable Development Fr Ugochukwu Ugwoke, who is a Nigerian; and the late Church History expert Fr Joachim Schmiedl.

== Mission ==
The members of the Institute work to a large extent in pastoral functions in the various branches of the Schoenstatt Movement. Many are also active in parish ministry, in social projects, in school ministry or entrusted with other tasks by the local authorities of the Catholic Church. A few members live a contemplative life in community or as hermits. Some notable projects started and supported by the Institute are the Mariya Arafasha Foundation in Burundi; the María Ayuda Foundation in Chile; Sunrise Children's Village in southern Tamil Nadu, India, among others.

== General superiors ==
Period in office	Name
1965–1968	Wilhelm Wissing
1968–1974	Bodo Maria Erhard
1974–1991	Francisco Javier Errázuriz Ossa
1991–2003	Michael Johannes Marmann
2003–2015	Heinrich Walter (Catholic priest) (de)
2015–2022	Juan Pablo Catoggio
2022–2028	Alexandre Awi Mello

== Abuse and prevention of abuse ==
Some members of this Institute have been accused of Catholic Church sex abuse cases in Chile and the USA. Some of these cases have been or are still under investigation. In some countries, the Institute has made available the contact of people in charge of receiving reports about abusive behaviour by its members (Chile, Germany).
