= Schoenstatt Apostolic Movement =

Roman Catholic Marian movement based in Germany

Apostolic Movement of Schoenstatt
- Formation: 18 October 1914
- Type: Catholic movement
- Headquarters: Schoenstatt, Vallendar, Germany
- Region served: Worldwide, 110 nations
- Founder: Joseph Kentenich
- Website: schoenstatt.com

The Apostolic Movement of Schoenstatt (German: Schönstatt-Bewegung) is a Catholic Marian movement founded in Germany in 1914 by Fr Joseph Kentenich, who saw the movement as a means of spiritual renewal for the Catholic Church. The movement is named after the small locality of Schönstatt (which means "beautiful place") which is part of the town of Vallendar near Koblenz, in Germany.

As a movement of renewal within the Catholic Church, Schoenstatt works to revitalize the Church and society in the spirit of the Gospel. Its members seek to connect faith with daily life, especially through a deep love for Mary, the Mother of God, who helps, educates and guides them in becoming better followers of Christ. As an international movement, it has expanded to every continent and has members from all vocations and walks in life. It is a spiritual family whose many branches and communities join to form a single Schoenstatt Family.

== History ==
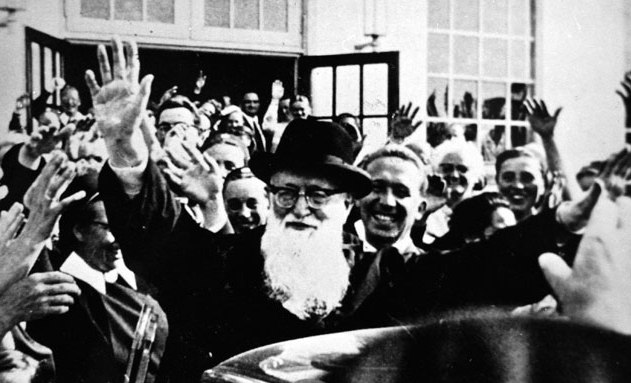
Father Joseph Kentenich

The Schoenstatt Movement was founded in 1914, when Father Joseph Kentenich, the spiritual director in a Pallottine school in Vallendar, Germany, and a young group of seminarians sealed the "Covenant of Love" with the Virgin Mary in a small chapel, now known as the Original Schoenstatt Shrine. Father Kentenich was inspired in part by the success of Bartolo Longo in establishing the Marian shrine to Our Lady of the Rosary of Pompeii, and felt called to establish a new shrine in Schoenstatt, to "create a spirituality which would be adaptable to conditions of rapid changes in the modern world".

Throughout its early years, Schoenstatt began to grow as a retreat center for different groups. During World War I, many of the young seminarians, such as Joseph Engling, were put to the test when they were called to serve at the battlefronts. There, “the lives and testimonies of the young Schoenstatt members attracted more people from different states of life.”

During the 1930s, with the rise of Adolf Hitler, Fr. Kentenich and other Schoenstatters, such as Fr. Franz Reinisch, criticized Nazism, and as a consequence the Schoenstatt Movement was registered as a threat to the Nazi regime. In 1941, Fr. Kentenich was arrested and sent to the Dachau concentration camp, where he began to expand Schoenstatt among the prisoners. He would remain there until 1945 when the concentration camp was liberated.

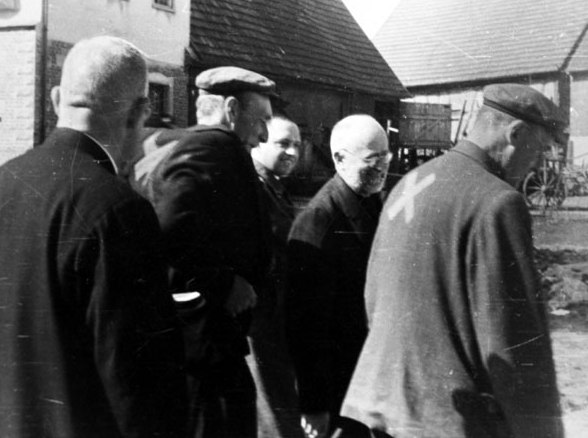
Father Joseph Kentenich in the Dachau concentration camp (second from the right).

Between 1947 and 1948, Fr. Kentenich visited South Africa, Brazil, Argentina, Uruguay, Chile and the United States to help communities in these countries to build up Schoenstatt. During this time, Fr. Kentenich met thousands of people, many of whom would play important roles in the development of the Movement, such as the Chilean Mario Hiriart and the Brazilian deacon Don Joao Pozzobon. In 1950, Pozzobon began the Pilgrim Mother Apostolate. He travelled thousands of miles on foot to evangelize in schools, prisons, hospitals, and homes.

In May 1949, Fr. Kentenich wrote a letter to the Church authorities in Germany, well known in Schoenstatt as "Epistola Perlonga". In this letter, Fr. Kentenich highlights the dangers that the Church faces due to some models of theological thinking which “separates the life of God from His creation and our Spirit of humanity.” The letter was considered offensive by German and Vatican Church authorities, and resulted in Fr. Kentenich's exile to Milwaukee (USA) for 14 years.

According to the Schoenstatt Movement, “the Second Vatican Council opened a new vision of the Church which better understood the Work of Fr. Kentenich. In 1965, he was called to return to his native land and was fully rehabilitated by Pope Paul VI.” During the following three years, he was able to continue his work with Schoenstatt. He died on September 15, 1968.

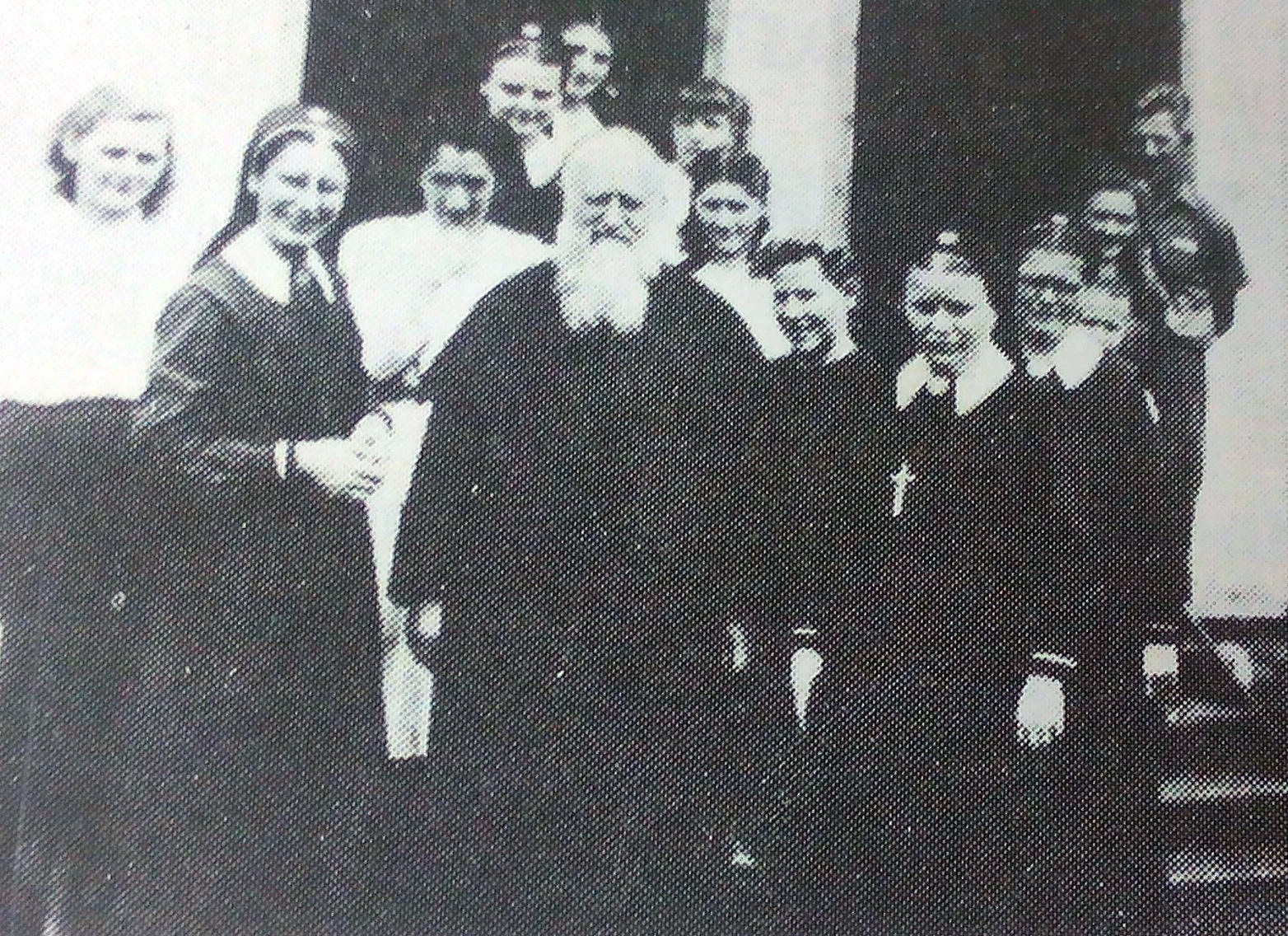
Fr. Kentenich in Oberá, Argentina with Sisters of Mary and other missionaries.

After the death of Father Kentenich, the Schoenstatt Movement “remained profoundly attached to the person of the Founder, working on the growth of creative loyalty to his mission and his charism, adapting itself to new cultural environments and historical challenges.” Schoenstatt has continued to grow through the Movement's various apostolates, such as the Pilgrim Mother Apostolate, which has reached millions of people in many countries, social and educational actions around the world, the development of Federations, Leagues, and other groups for families, youth, and pilgrims, and the expansion of Schoenstatt shrines (207 at the present).

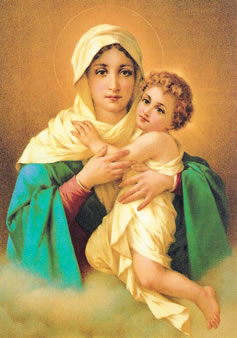
Mother Thrice Admirable Madonna by Luigi Crosio, 1898

== Mother Thrice Admirable ==
The picture of Mother Thrice Admirable (Mater ter Admirabilis in Latin) was donated by a teacher in 1915 to the Pallotine seminarians under the spiritual direction of Father Kentenich. It was painted in 1898 by Luigi Crosio under the title Refugium Peccatorum Madonna (Refuge of Sinners). It has since been called the Mother Thrice Admirable Madonna, a key symbol of the Schoenstatt movement.

== Communities of the Apostolic Movement of Schoenstatt ==
=== Secular Institutes ===
These are organized on the international level. According to the official website, "The members of a Secular Institute oblige themselves to a permanent apostolate and to an established form of community," and they "belong to the form of Consecrated Life in the Church and are of 'Pontifical right'."

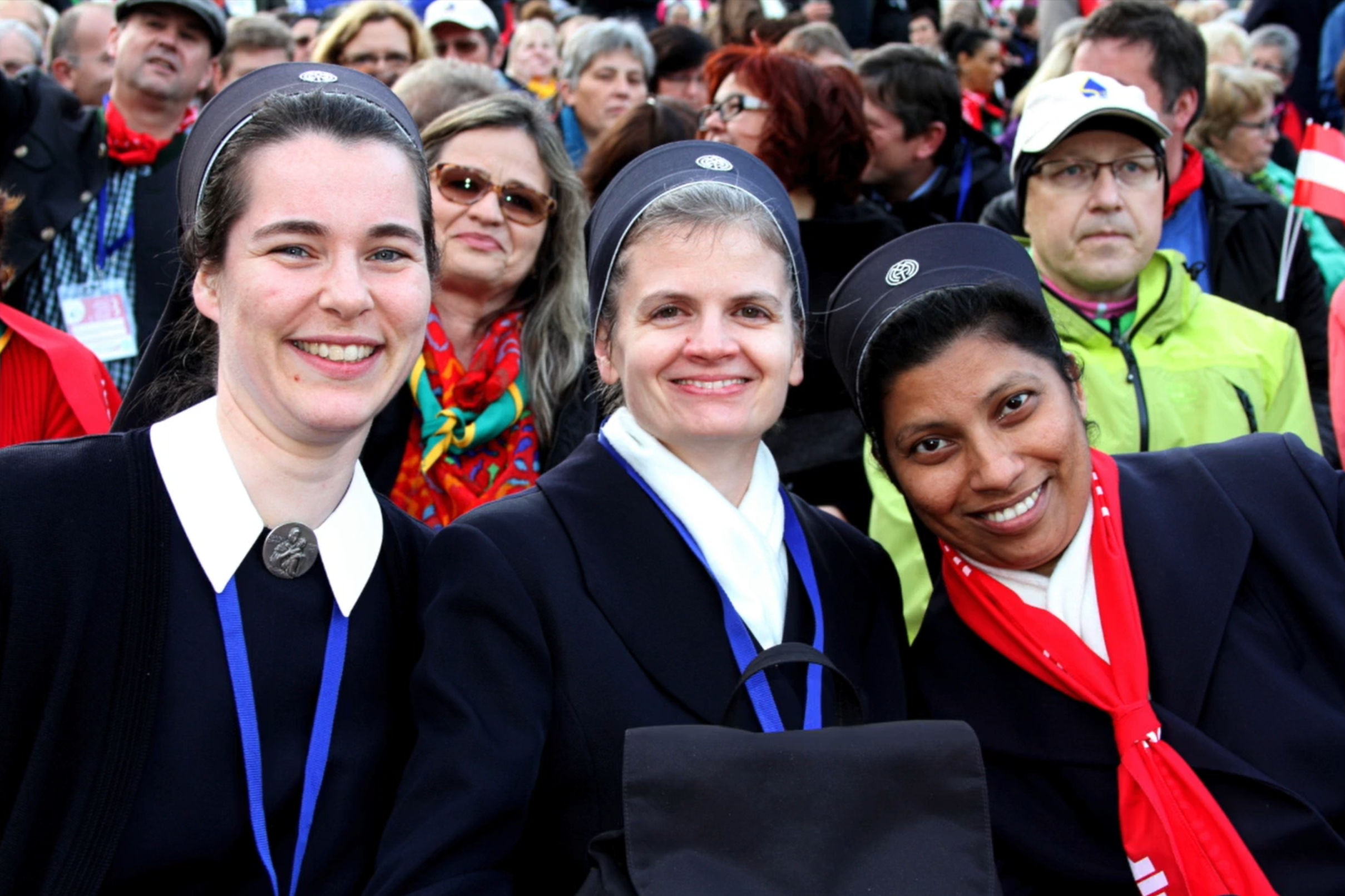
Currently there are around 1,800 Schoenstatt Sisters of Mary around the world.

There are six secular institutes in the Schoenstatt Movement:

- Secular Institute of the Sisters of Mary
- Secular Institute of the Brothers of Mary
- Secular Institute of Schoenstatt Diocesan Priests
- Secular Institute of Schoenstatt Fathers
- Secular Institute of Ladies of Schoenstatt
- Secular Institute of Families

=== Apostolic Federations ===
These are organized on the national level. According to the official website, "Members of the Federation oblige themselves to a permanent apostolic service and foster an established form of community. In the spirit of the evangelical counsels, they strive for perfection in keeping with their state in life."

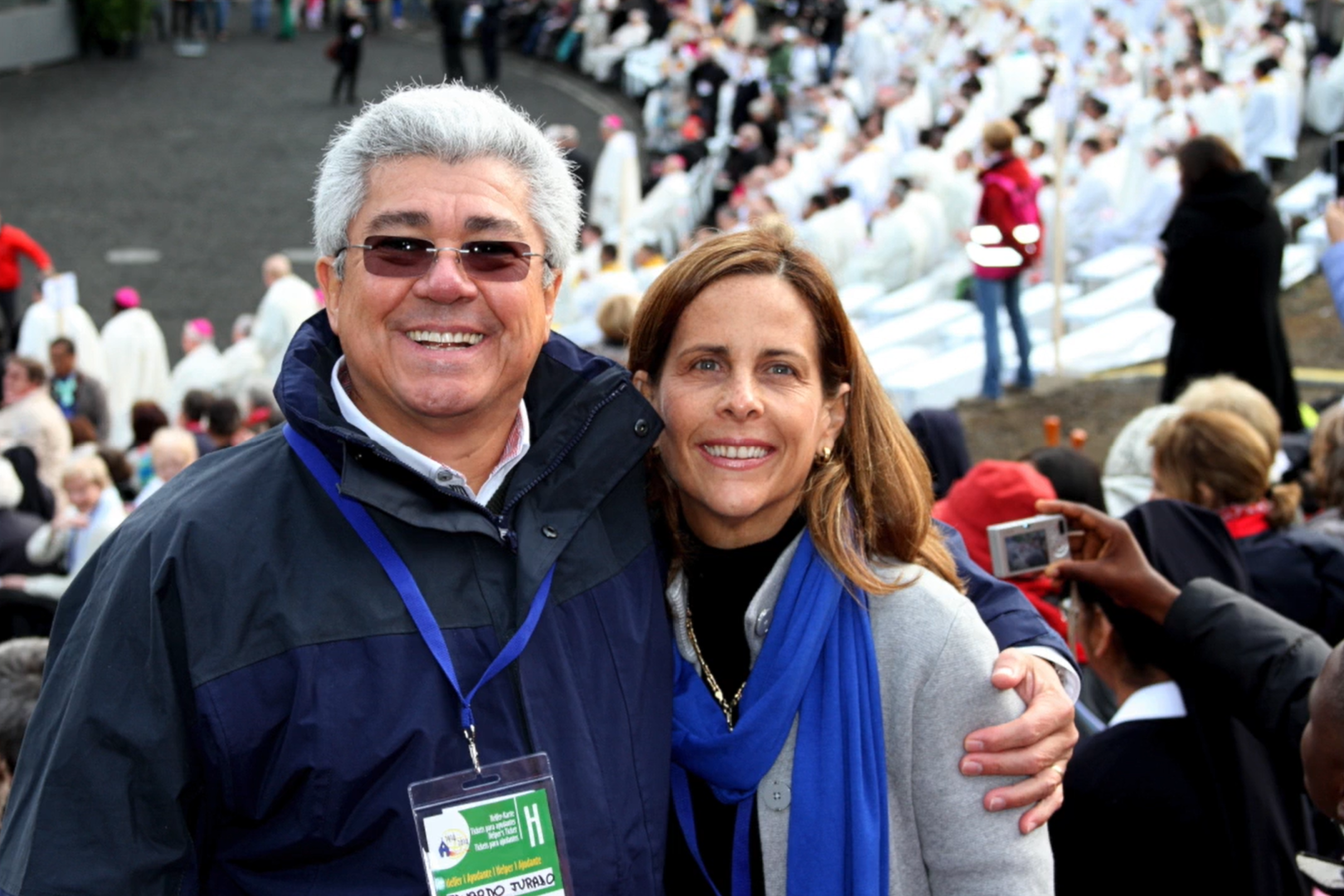
Couple from Ecuador at the 2014 100-Year Schoenstatt Jubilee

The following are the Apostolic Federations of the Schoenstatt Movement:

- Men's Federation
- Family Federation
- Women's Federation
- Mother's Federation
- Priest's Federation

=== Apostolic Leagues ===
These are organized on the diocesan level. According to the official website, "Belonging to the League are people who, aspiring to sanctity, allow themselves to be educated by Schoenstatt and in this way make efforts to carry out an apostolic activity service in their lives". Pilgrims are also associated to the Schoenstatt Apostolic Leagues. While they do not incorporate themselves to a specific branch of the movement, they maintain regular contact with the shrine and the Apostolic Movement.

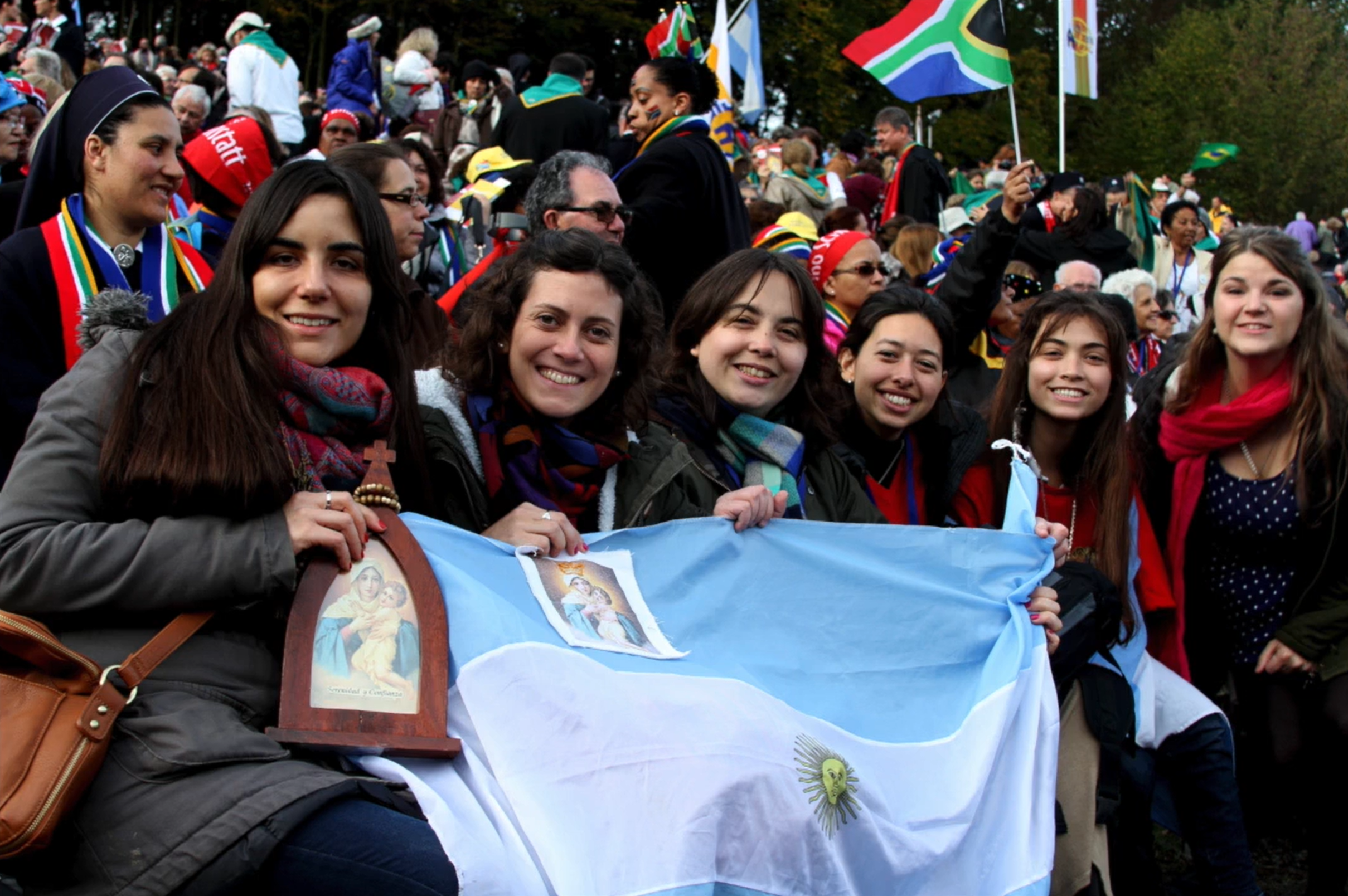
Schoenstatt Pilgrims from Argentina in the 2014 100-Year Schoenstatt Jubilee

The Apostolic League includes groups like Girl's Youth, Professional Women's League, Mother's League, Priest's League, Men's League, Boy's Youth, Family League, and People and Pilgrims.

== Organs of Coordination ==
=== At the International Level ===
- General Presidium - According to the official website, "The General Presidium represents the entire Apostolic Movement of Schoenstatt. In its relationship to the Holy See, the General Presidium is dependent on the Pontifical Dicastery for the Laity, Family and Life, to which it periodically informs about the life and activities of the Apostolic Movement of Schoenstatt". As of January 2021, Father Juan Pablo Catoggio (Argentina) is the president of the General Presidium of the Schoenstatt Movement.
- International Coordination of the Schoenstatt Movement - In addition to maintaining the Movement's official website and social media platforms, it collaborates in the unity of the Movement at the international level. Father Heinrich Walter (Germany) and Sister M. Cacilda Becker (Brazil) are the international coordinators of the Schoenstatt Movement.

=== At the National Level ===
- National Presidium - It represents the Apostolic Movement before the Bishops' Conference of that country.
- National Central Committee
- Diocesan Councils

== Schoenstatt Around the World ==
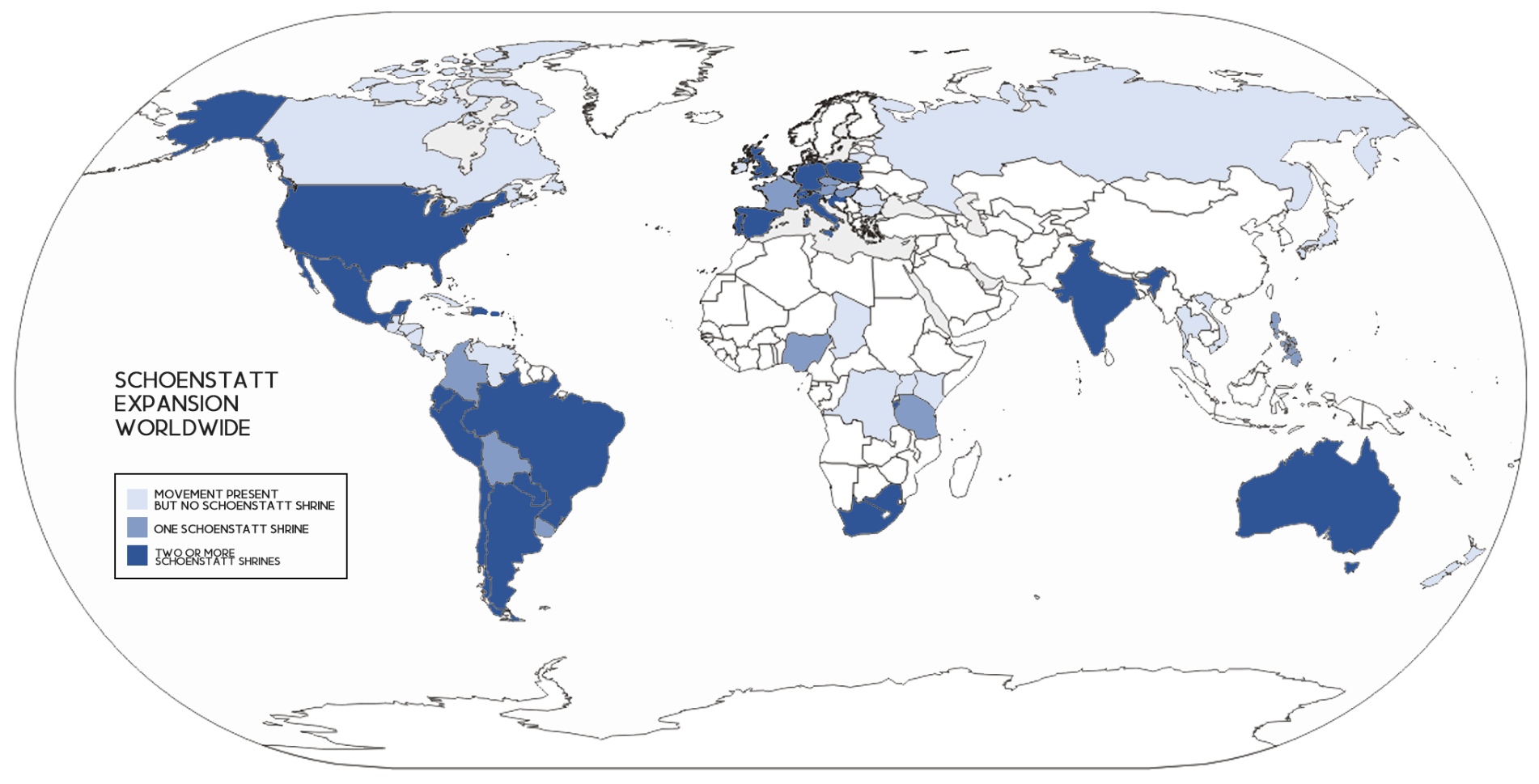
Schoenstatt Movement Expansion Around the World

The Schoenstatt Movement is expanded in more than 110 countries. Some of those are:

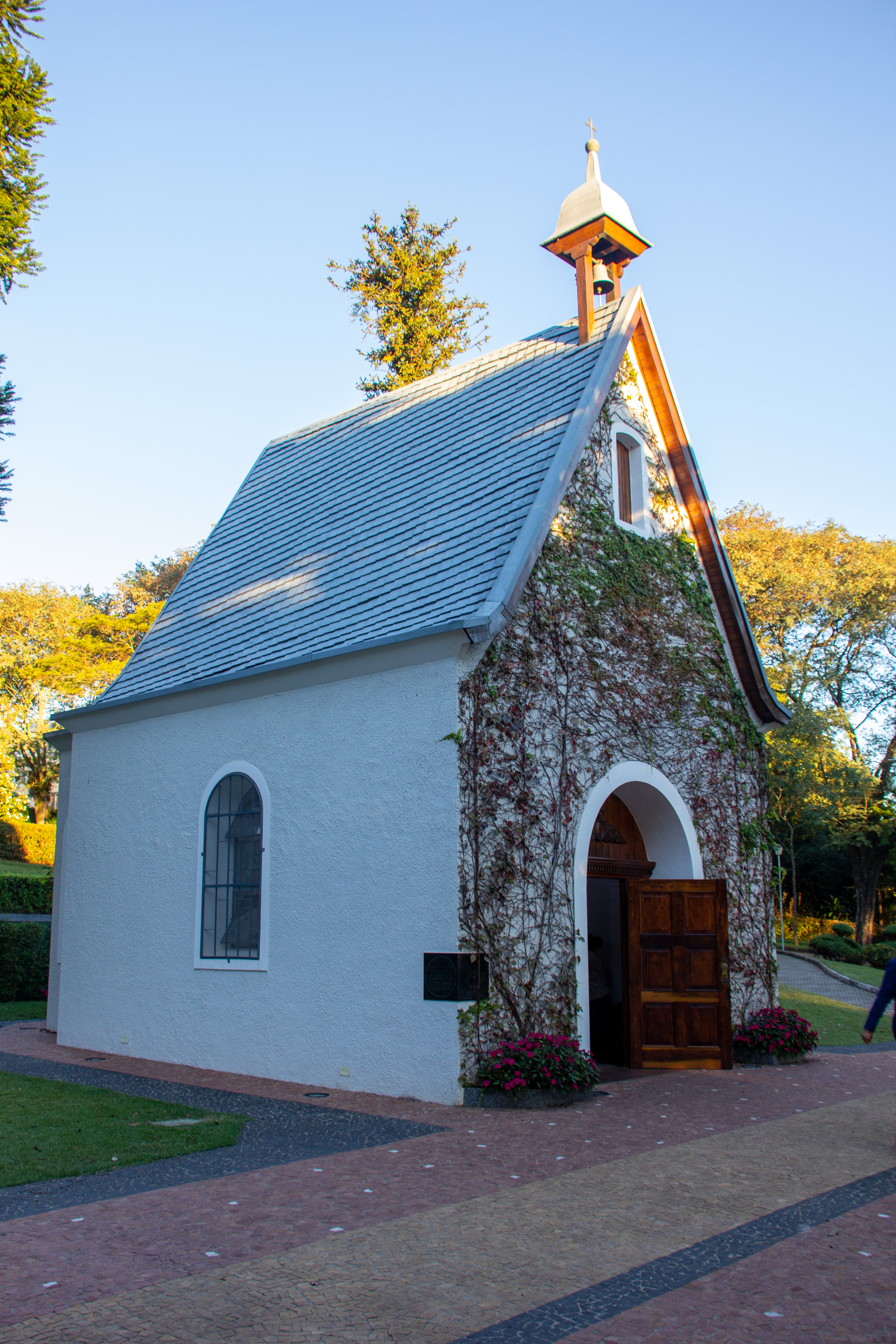
Schoenstatt Shrine, Atibaia, Brazil

Argentina (20 shrines), Australia (3 shrines), Austria (1 shrine), Belgium, Bolivia (1 shrine), Brazil (23 shrines), Burundi (2 shrines), Canada, Chad, Chile (25 shrines), Colombia (2 shrines), Congo, Costa Rica (1 shrine), Croatia (2 shrines), Cuba, Czech Republic (1 shrine), Dominican Republic (2 shrines), Ecuador (4 shrines), El Salvador, France (1 shrine), Germany (56 shrines), Guatemala, Honduras, Hong Kong, Hungary (1 shrine), India (6 shrines), Italy (2), Lithuania, Luxemburg, Mexico (4 shrines), Nicaragua, Nigeria (1 shrine), Panama, Paraguay (3 shrines), Peru (2 shrines), Philippines (1 shrine), Poland (6 shrines), Portugal (4 shrines), Puerto Rico (4 shrines), Romania, Russia, Slovakia, Slovenia, South Africa (5 shrines), Spain (3 shrines), Switzerland (7 shrines), Tanzania (1 shrine), United Kingdom (2 shrines), Uruguay (1 shrine), USA (10 shrines), Venezuela, Vietnam.

207 Schoenstatt Shrines have been built worldwide, providing a center for the Schoenstatt community in that region. According to the official website, "The Schoenstatt Shrine is one of the great places of pilgrimage of the Catholic Church with about 15 million people who regularly draw from its stream of graces". Schoenstatt also makes itself present through the Pilgrim Mother Campaign, which spans more than 110 countries in the world, with around 30 million members.

== Spirituality ==
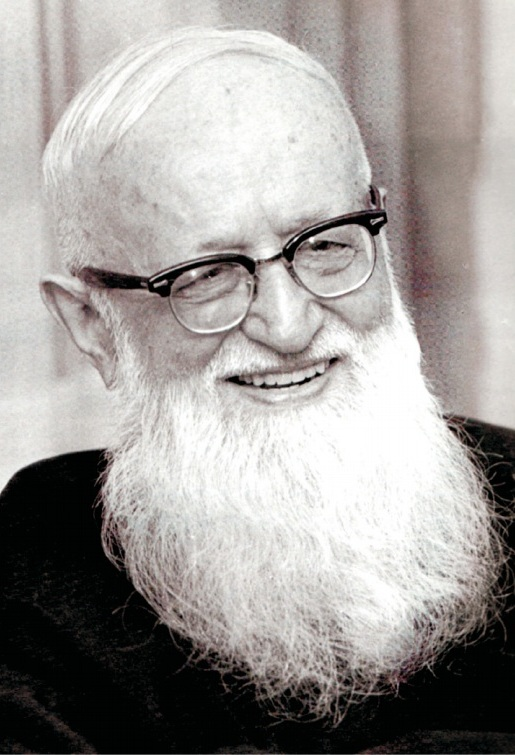
Father Joseph Kentenich, founder of the Schoenstatt Movement

The central issues in the Schoenstatt Movement are the ideas based on that which Father Joseph Kentenich founded the movement in 1914, including Christian personality development, orientation toward ideals, and community.

"[Schoenstatt] wishes to be understood as a universal vision, comprising time and eternity, this world and the next, the economic, social, ethical, political and religious needs of all people, including the dispossessed, the millions of masses. …It wants to help redeem the world not only from its earthly sufferings, but also from sin and from its alienation from God. It tries to do this under the guidance and in the school of Our Lady by applying the original principles of Christianity in a new way to restore the disturbed relationship between the individual person and society, the person and business, the person and technology, and the person and social advancement." - Joseph Kentenich

=== Marian Devotion ===
Since the founding in 1914, love for Mary has been at the heart of the Schoenstatt Movement and its spirituality. According to the official website, "Schoenstatt is deeply and devotedly Marian and has repeatedly experienced how the love of Mary opens new avenues to a vibrant relationship with Christ, to the Holy Spirit, and to God the Father, as well as a renewal of love of neighbor and self. [...] In the Schoenstatt Shrine, the Blessed Mother acts as mother and educator of all those who entrust themselves to her. She helps form the new person in the new community."

“An authentic Marian spirituality leads to a deep love for the Church.” - St. Pope John Paul II to the Schoenstatt Family (September 20, 1985)

=== Shrine ===
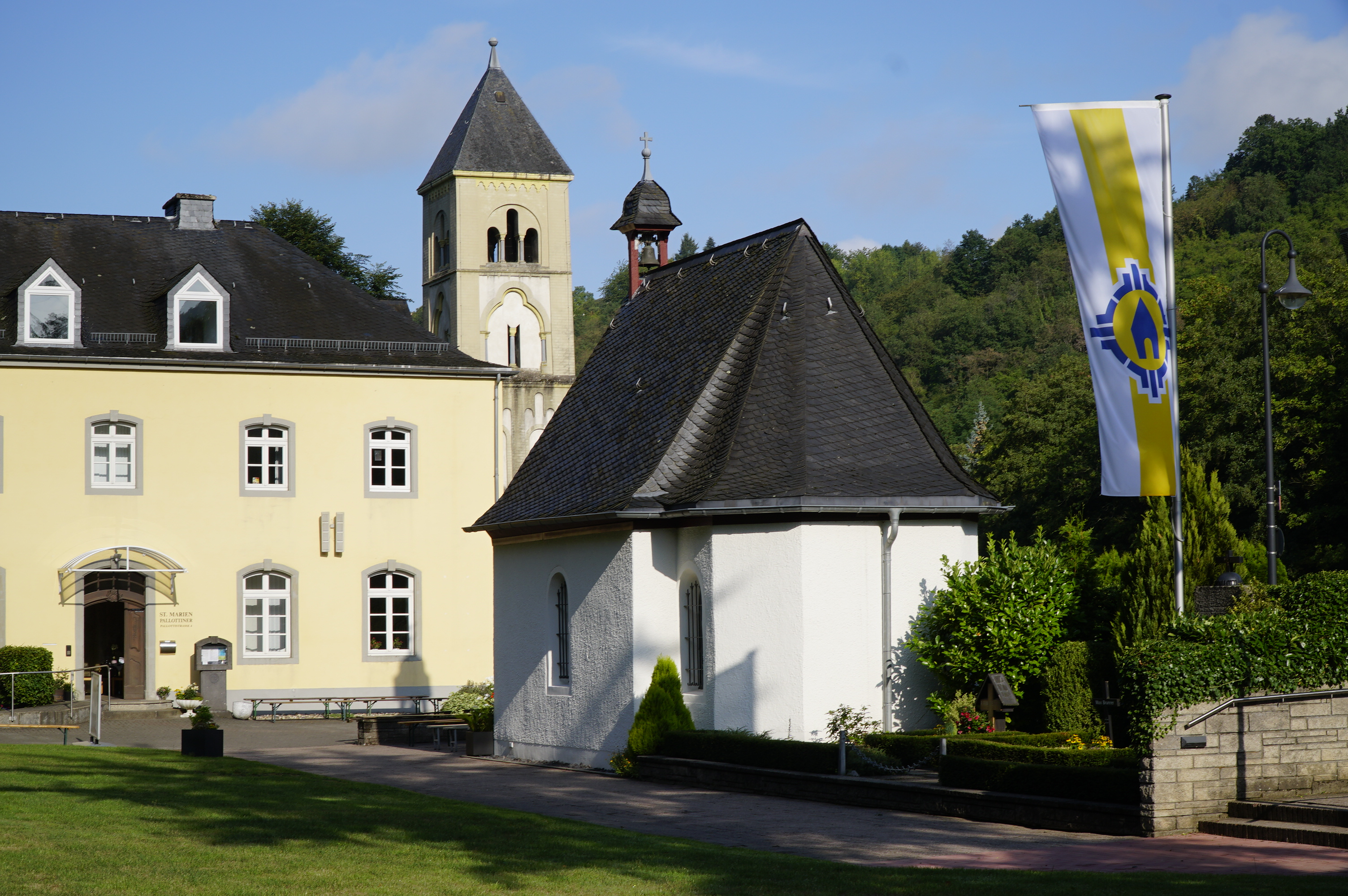
The Original Schoenstatt Shrine in Vallendar, Germany

It is Schoenstatt's conviction that the shrine is a place of grace and pilgrimage, "a certain place where God shows His presence and action in a special way, through Mary." Since the first Covenant of Love sealed by Father Kentenich and the founding members of Schoenstatt in 1914, millions of people have repeatedly observed that the shrine is a place of grace.

According to the official website, "Schoenstatt was founded in an act of invitation: The earthly partners offered their striving for sanctity, and the heavenly partner, Mary, was asked to come and actively dwell in the shrine as Mother and Educator. This is precisely what is known as the covenant of love upon which Schoenstatt was founded."

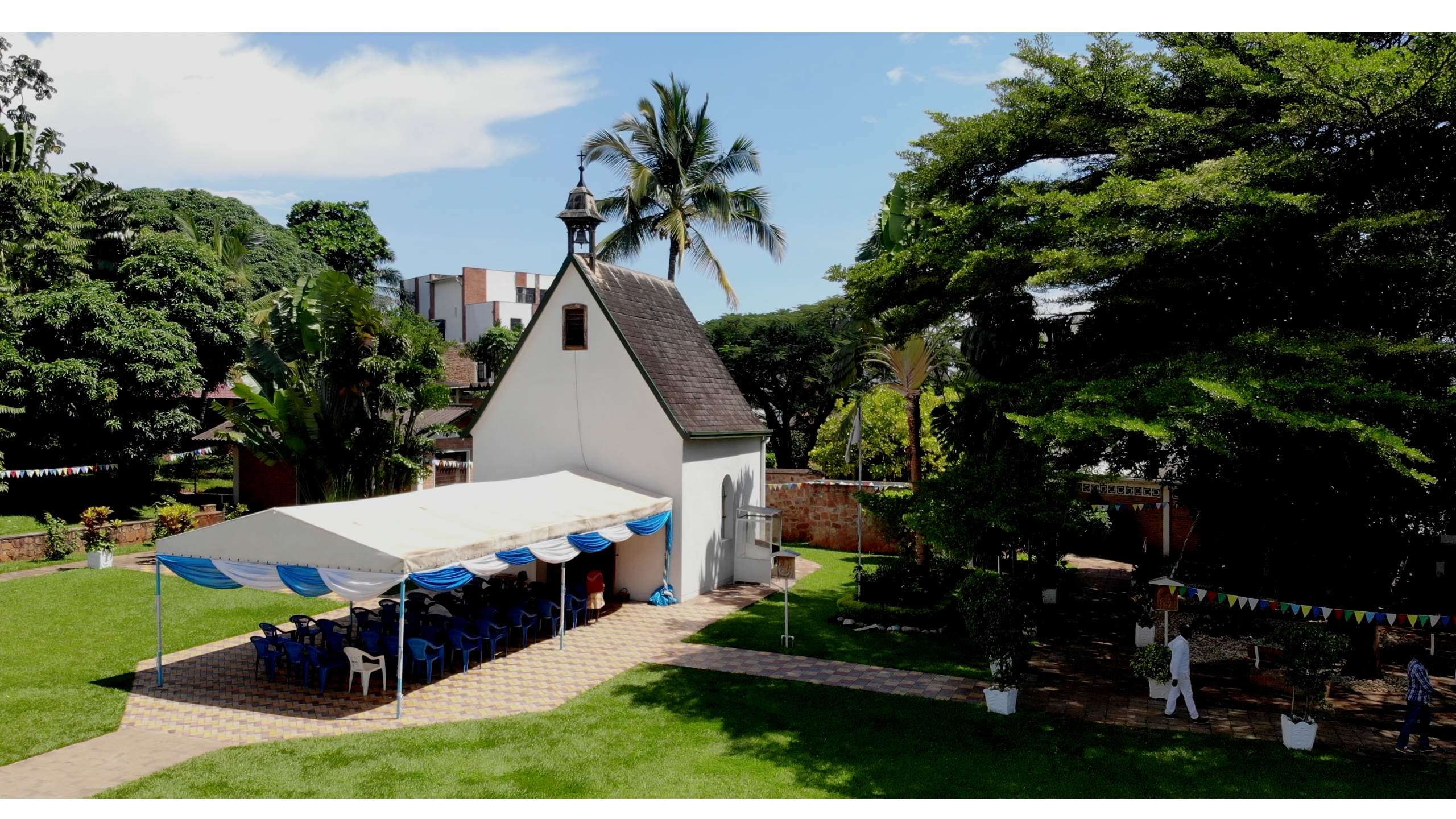
Schoenstatt Shrine Mutumbra, Burundi, Africa

What is now known as the Original Schoenstatt Shrine used to be a chapel devoted to St. Michael, near the Pallotine school where Father Kentenich served as spiritual director, in Vallendar, Germany. Since then, more than 200 "daughter shrines" - that is, exact replicas of the Original Shrine - have been built around the world. These shrines serve as the center of the Schoenstatt Movement in the community. From here, pilgrims and members of the Schoenstatt Movement receive the three graces of the shrine:

1. The grace of a home - It's the "awareness of knowing that Mary totally accepts you and gives you a home in her heart and in her shrine."
2. The grace of inner transformation - It is a "fruit of Mary’s intercession as mother and educator in the shrine, since she encourages us to become disciples of Christ, to interiorly transform and educate ourselves from within."
3. The grace of apostolic fruitfulness - When a person feels "completely at home and knows they are totally accepted and deeply transformed [that is, they have received the first two graces of the Schoenstatt Shrine] they are able to be more fully effective as an instrument of God."

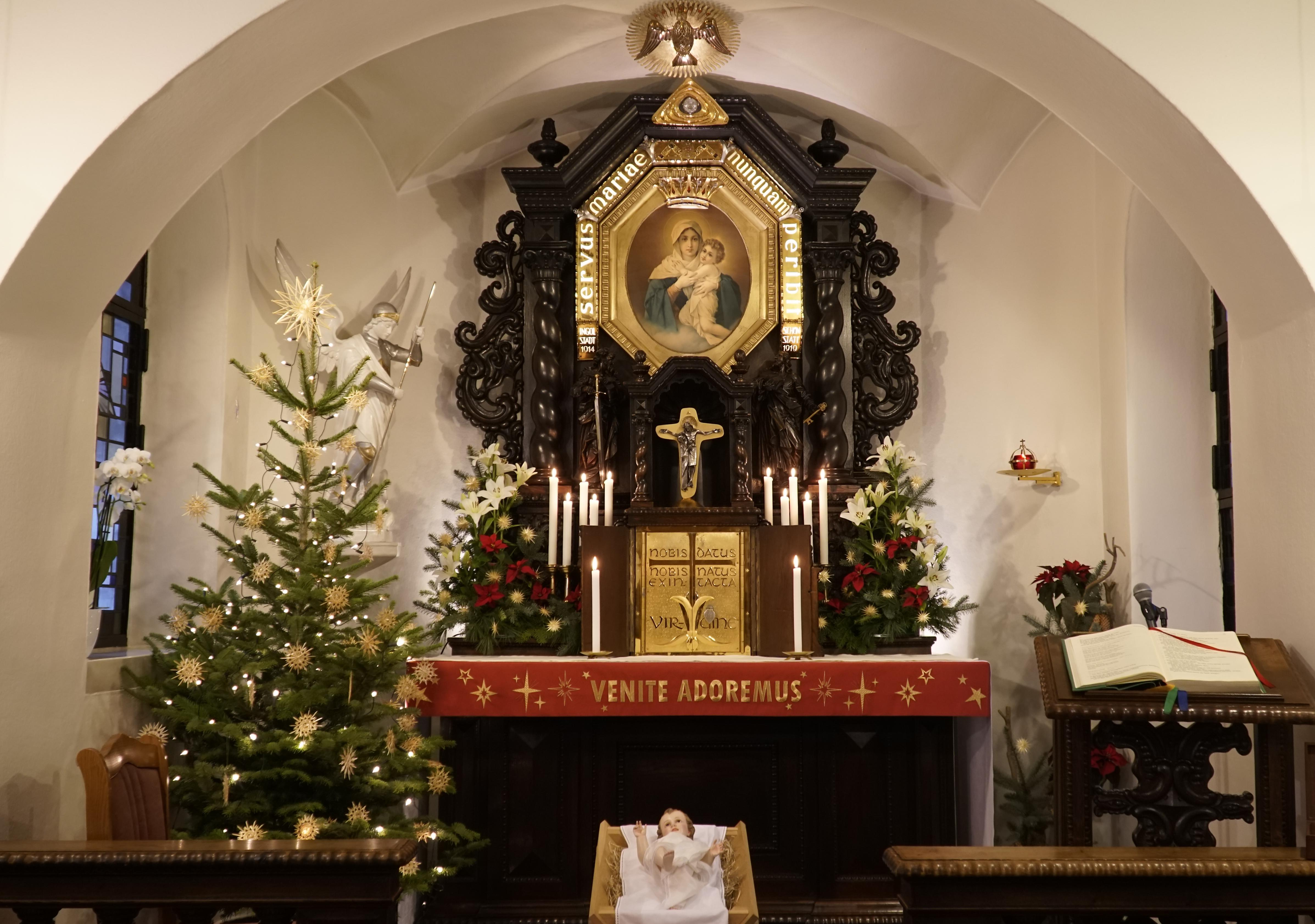
Schoenstatt Original Shrine on Christmas Eve

=== Covenant of Love ===
The Movement describes the Covenant of Love as "an act of consecration (as individual or community) to Mary as the Mother Thrice Admirable of Schoenstatt", and it is a recognized form of Marian consecration in the Catholic Church. For people who have sealed the Covenant of Love, this act of consecration brings about a deeper relationship with Mary, the Mother of God.

Schoenstatt's founding act in 1914 is the moment when Father Kentenich and the founding generation offered their striving for sanctity and asked Mary to come to dwell in their chapel, the Schoenstatt Shrine. It is from this original act that Schoenstatt's life, identity, and fruitfulness flow.

According to the official website, "Father Kentenich characterized Marian consecrations as a total and mutual exchange of hearts, goods, and interests. Through this exchange, one grows in love, in one’s overall spiritual life, and in the ability to fulfill one’s mission. In the Catholic experience, Mary has proven to be an outstanding consecration partner, leading persons, nations, communities, and generations to a deeper fervor of love and commitment to Christ and the Triune God."

=== Capital of Grace ===
The Catholic Church’s teaching on merits and "our possibility to cooperate in Christ’s work of salvation encourages us to actively strive for sanctity and make ourselves available for the building up of Christ’s Kingdom." In the Schoenstatt Movement, a unique way of expressing this is: contributions to the capital of grace. The Movement describes these contributions as stemming from the Covenant of Love with Mary, where members "consciously bring her our prayers, sacrifices, and striving for sanctity. We so-to-say turn over the merits of these good works to the MTA [Mother Thrice Admirable] for her mission in the service of Christ."

=== Everyday Sanctity ===
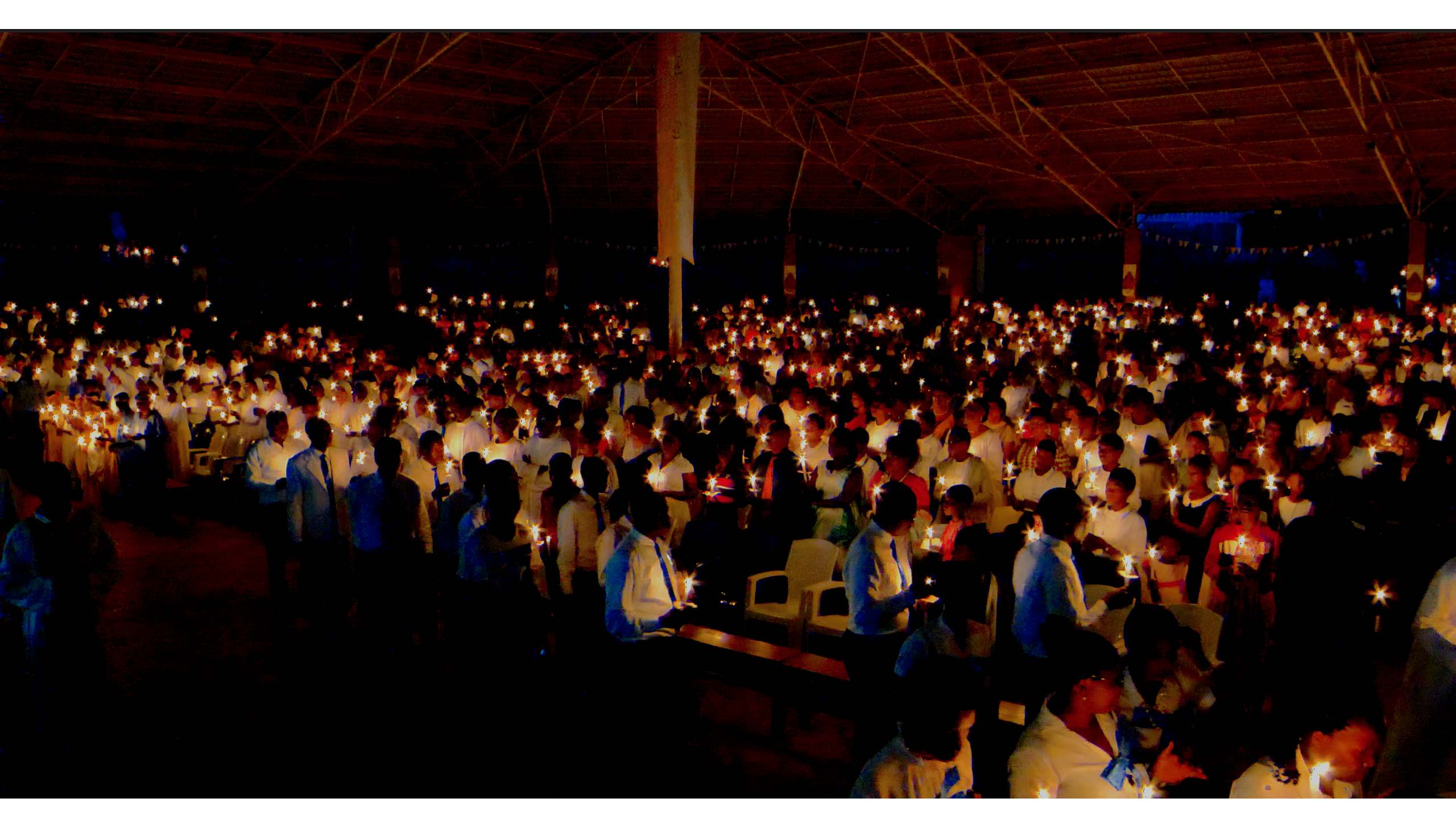
Schoenstatt Mass at the Easter Vigil in Mutumbra, Burundi

In Schoenstatt, the Christian vocation's call to holiness is understood as everyday (or workday) sanctity, meaning the integration of one's faith with every aspect of ordinary life.

The Schoenstatt Movement describes everyday sanctity as "doing one’s ordinary duties in an extraordinary way (ordinaria extraordinarie) or as fulfilling the duties of one’s state in life as perfectly as possible out of a total love for God." Father Kentenich developed its most comprehensive definition in 1932:

“Everyday sanctity is the God-pleasing harmony between wholehearted attachment to God, work, and fellow human beings in every circumstance of life.”

"Everyday sanctity is therefore being attentive about not neglecting God because of the world, nor one’s family because of apostolate, nor one’s neighbor because of work, nor one’s duties in life because of God. [...] Everyday sanctity also seeks to integrate work, prayer, and suffering." In this context, Schoenstatt understands "work as a person’s share in the creative activity of God, prayer as a dialogue of love with God, and suffering as a crucial part of the Christian vocation."

=== Practical Faith in Divine Providence ===
In Schoenstatt, Practical Faith in Divine Providence is "a faith in God and His loving care that has been made part of practical everyday life", and it has the form of "a message of trust in God’s care, of a constant dialogue with the God of life and history, and of actively seeking God’s will."

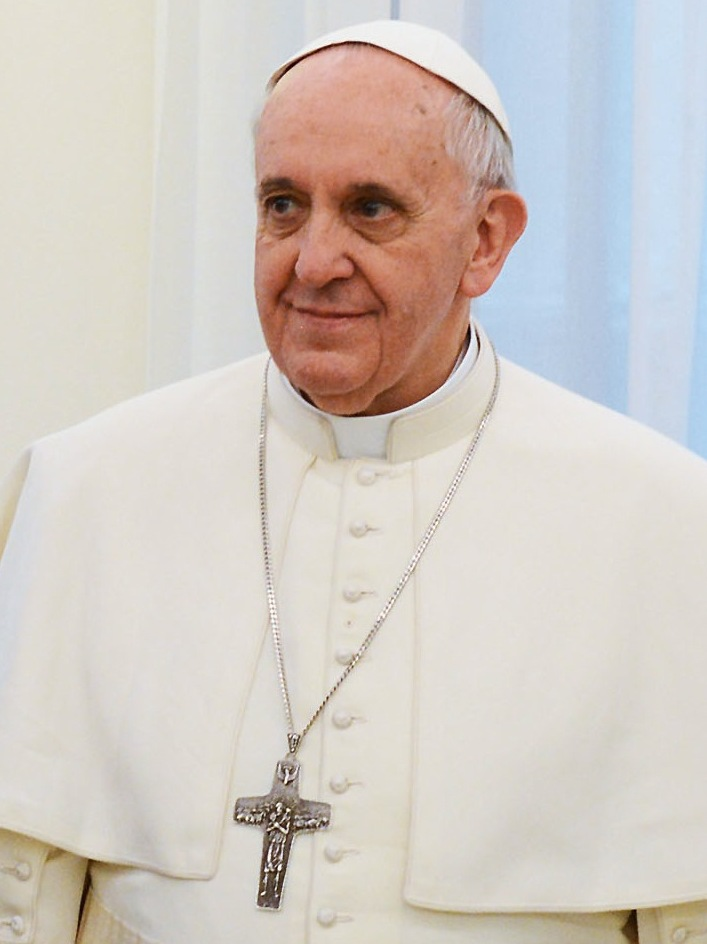
Pope Francis

In this practice of faith, one seeks God's message in every circumstance. Moreover, one seeks to live the covenant with God in an ongoing dialog of prayer and actions. In Schoenstatt, discerning God's voice involves "being attentive to the events around us, both on the large scale (Church and world) and on the small scale (personal and family life). One way of doing this is Schoenstatt’s method of meditation."

Fr Kentenich expressed it very well when he said that it was important to keep “an ear to the heart of God and a hand on the pulse of the times”. These are the two pillars of an authentic spiritual life. - Pope Francis addressing the Schoenstatt Fathers (September 3, 2015)

== Schoenstatt life ==
There are five aspects of the Schoenstatt Movement's life:

=== Church ===
As a movement of renewal within the Catholic Church, "it sees its main task as being to be close to the local and universal Church, in order to make the Church fruitful with its charism and at the same time allow itself to be fertilized by it". The Schoenstatt Movement works with parishes, dioceses, other communities, laity, couples and public officials.

=== Education/Pedagogy ===
One of Father Kentenich's major focuses in his work was pedagogy. He gave countless lectures to thousands of people, and retreats to families, priests, and other members of the Schoenstatt Movement. What is known today as Kentenich pedagogy "has been successfully applied in innumerable institutions, universities, life groups and religious communities, schools, homes, Children's Homes, families and companies", extending the Schoenstatt spirituality to broad areas of society.

=== Marriage and Family ===
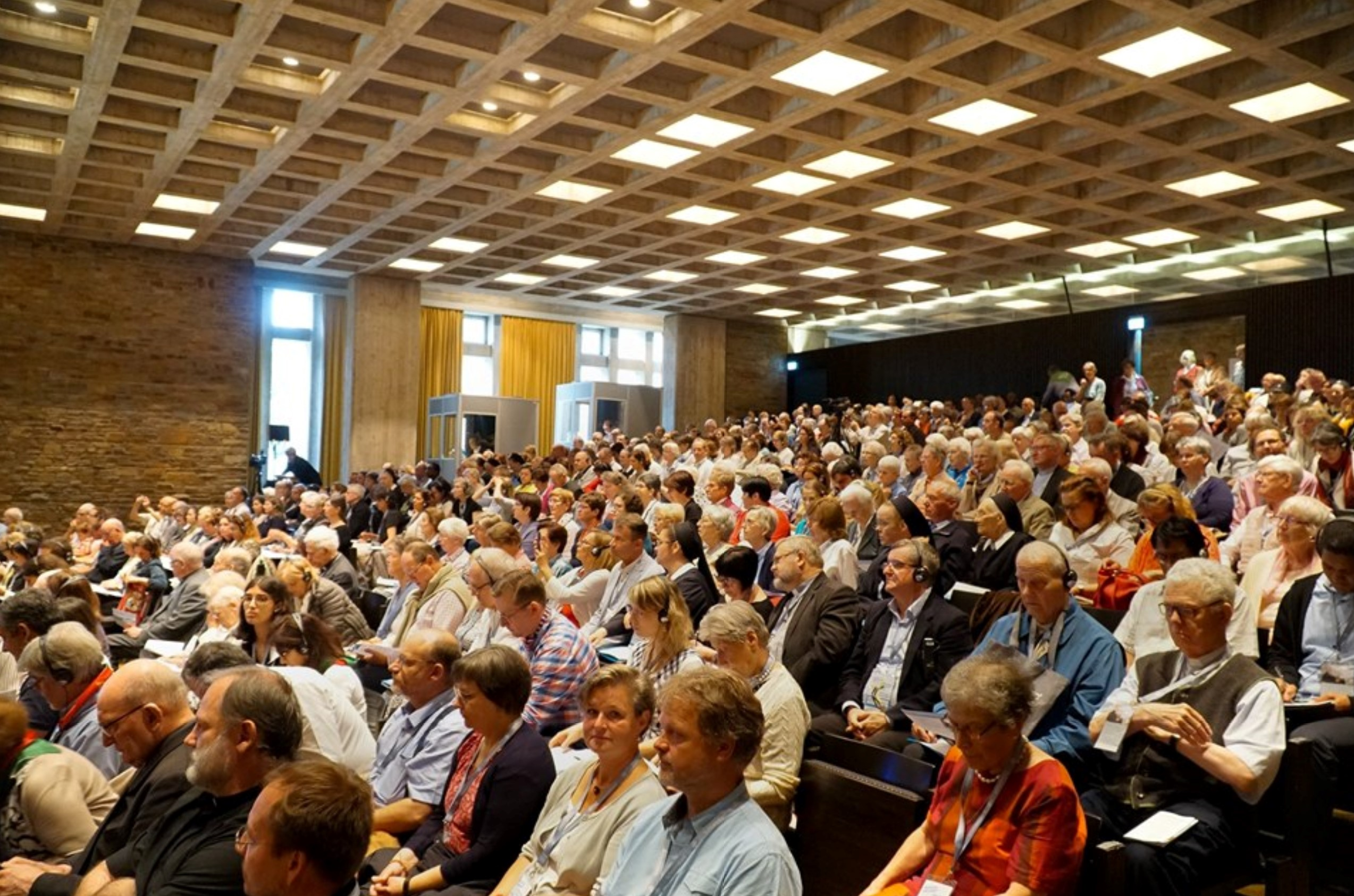
Lecture at the Schoenstatt Movement's 2019 Hoerde Conference in Vallendar, Germany

Family life is essential to the Schoenstatt Movement's spirituality and pedagogy. Around the world, in the Family Institutes, Federations, and Leagues, the Movement holds various retreats, seminars, and meetings on topics related to marriage, education, and family, all of which are meant to cultivate family relationships. In the field of formation, the Schoenstatt Movement's aims are "to strengthen the development towards a mature personality, someone who lives their relationships with responsibility with the world around them. In short, it is about discovering, cultivating, and forming marriage as a vocation of life."

"Whatever you achieve for the benefit of the family will show its effectiveness beyond the family, and will work in many men and women and within society. The future of the world and of the Church depends on the family." - Pope John Paul II to the Schoenstatt Movement

=== Society ===
The Schoenstatt Movement is active in the areas concerning social commitment, such as "the development of local communities, prison and hospital ministry, business and work, helping abandoned children and children from low-income families, commitment to the sick, commitment to the elderly, commitment to immigrants." There are countless social projects organized by members of the Schoenstatt Movement (such as the Schoenstatt Fathers, Sisters of Mary, families, and volunteers) that are present worldwide and that seek to transmit "a social spirit, which consists of virtues such as respect, dignity, radiating love, peace, and joy, believing in the good of each person, in their mission, their dignity and their value as a child of God."

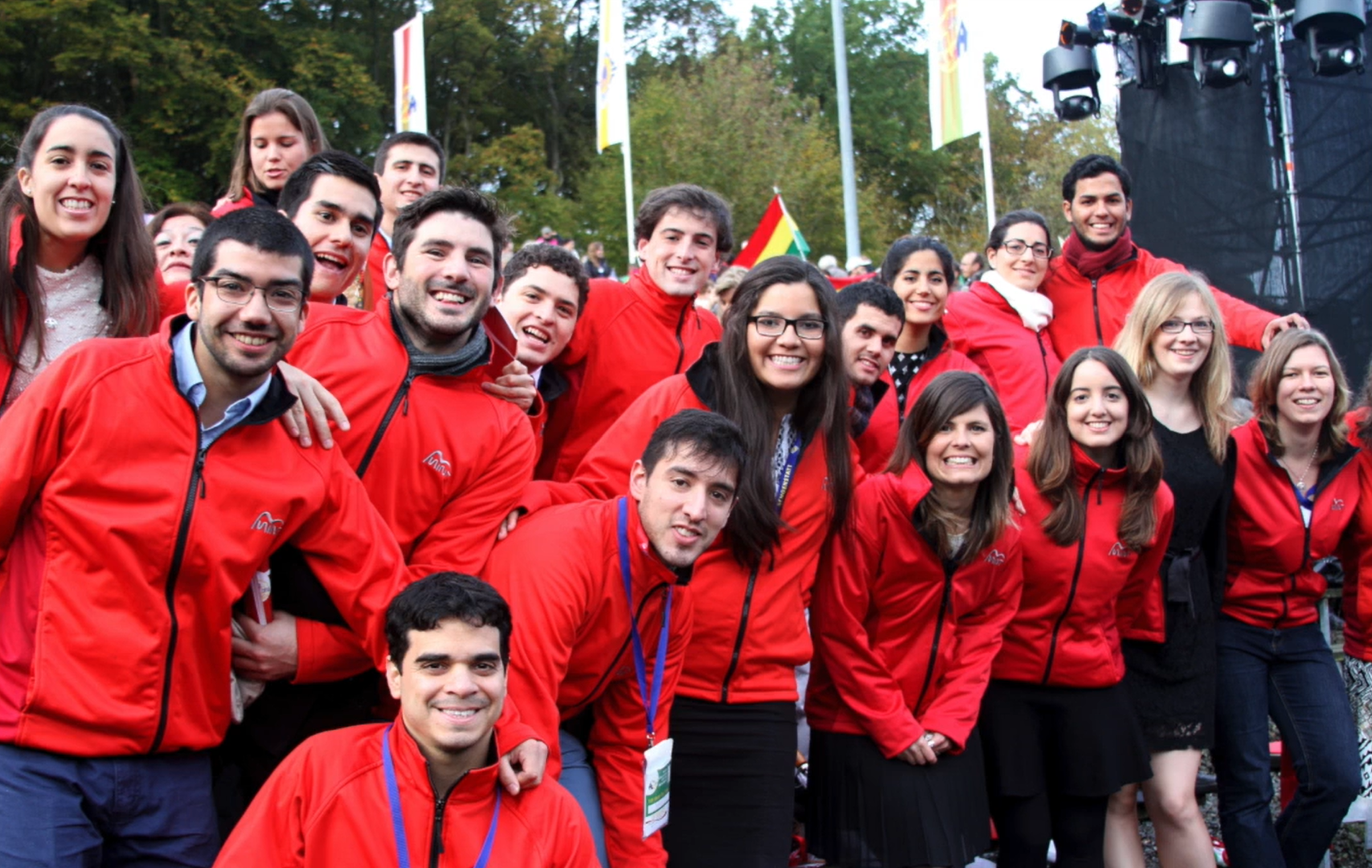
A group of Schoenstatt youth at the 2014 100-year Schoenstatt Jubilee

=== Youth ===
The Schoenstatt Movement "accompanies and guides young people to positively face the challenges they encounter in their everyday lives. [...] It offers them support, guidance, social networks, creative fields of action, a lived spirituality and a world of attachments. The youth use their physical, intellectual, and spiritual strengths in planning projects to promote improvements in their environment and in making them a reality". The Schoenstatt Youth organizes retreats and camps all over the world, celebrates religious festivals, pilgrimages, university, school and family missions, and commits itself in solidarity works.

== Apostolic actions ==
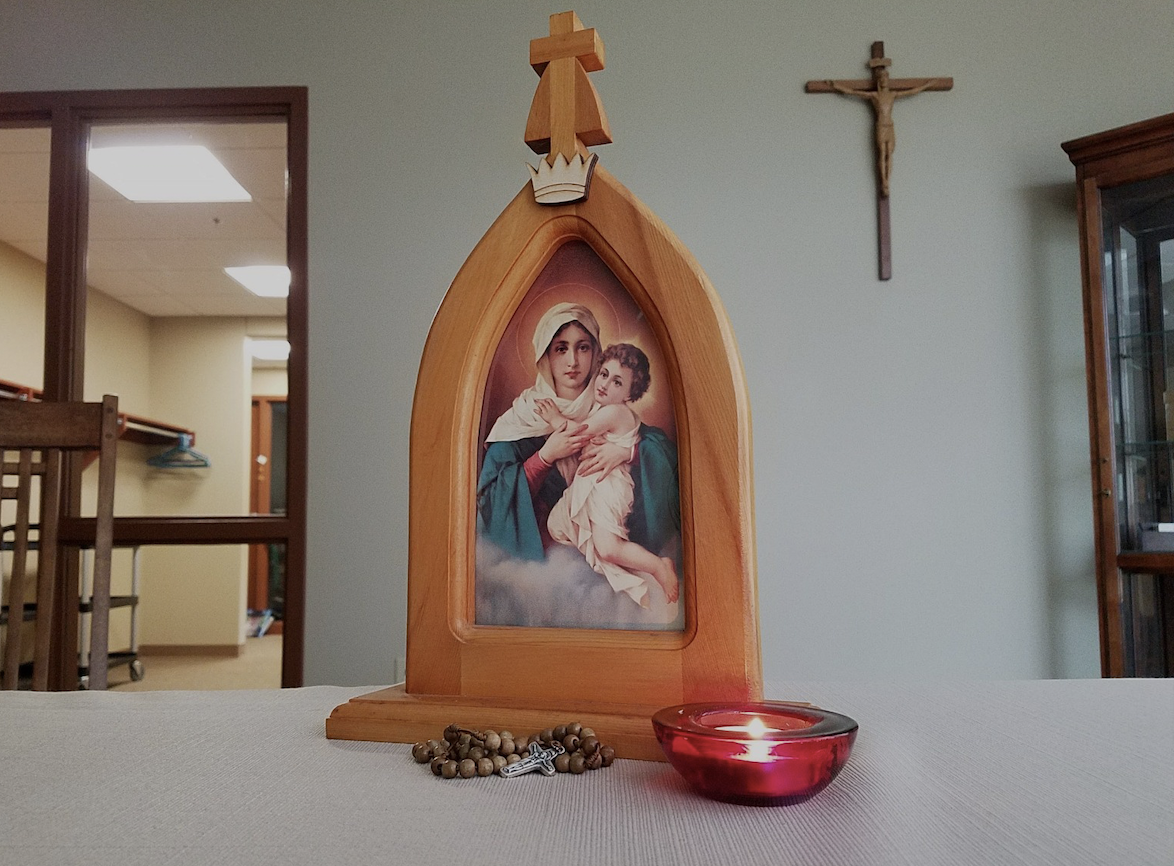
Pilgrim Mother of the Schoenstatt Movement, used to evangelize around the world. Images like this have been taken by missionaries to millions of people.

The movement is involved in several apostolic actions, including missionary work, charity, education, and other projects. The most widespread activity is the Pilgrim Mother Campaign, now spanning more than 110 countries in the world, with around 30 million members.

=== Schoenstatt 100-year Jubilee ===
On 18 October 2014 the Apostolic Schoenstatt Movement celebrated 100 years of its founding. According to the official website of the 2014 Jubilee, "this jubilee is a thanksgiving for a richly blessed history. It marks the outpouring of the Schoenstatt Movement into a new era, guided by the grace of its beginnings, and can be summarized by the expression: covenant of love."

Around 12,000 pilgrims from 100 countries gathered in Schoenstatt, Germany for week-long celebrations and festivities. From there, members went on a pilgrimage to Rome, where they had a General Audience with Pope Francis on 25 October 2014. These celebrations and General Audience with the pope were streamed live to hundreds of thousands of people around the world who celebrated and gathered in their local Schoenstatt shrines.

=== Youth festival ===
In 2005, about four thousand young people from around the world – Germany, Poland, England, Italy, Uruguay, Argentine, Chile, Mexico, Puerto Rico, Costa Rica, Africa, United States, etc. – gathered for almost a week in the Original Shrine in Schoenstatt, Vallendar, for the Schoenstatt Youth Festival prior to the World Youth Day in Cologne.

=== Schoenstatt Summer ===
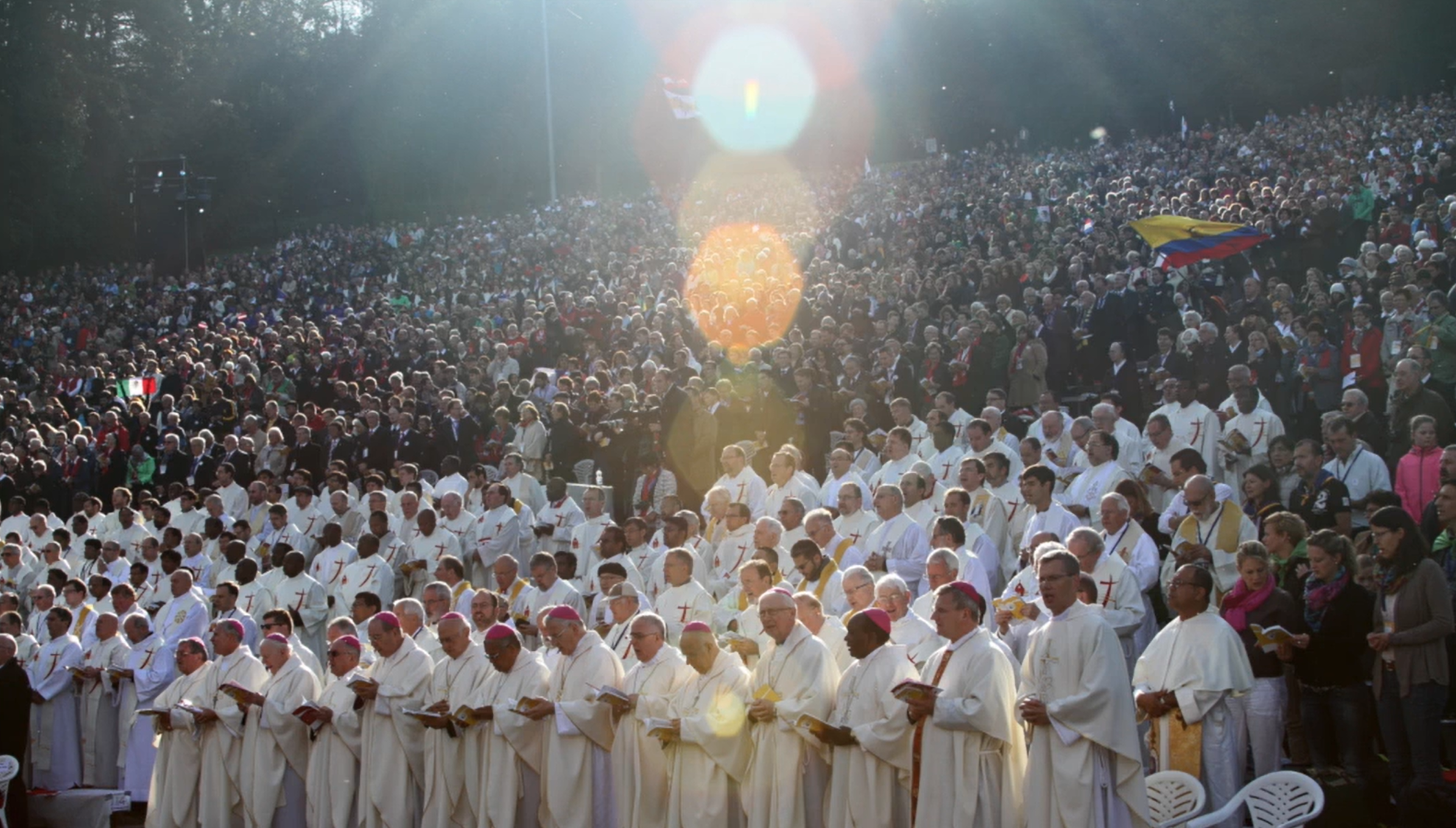
Priests, Bishops, and about 12,000 pilgrims present at the 2014 100-year Schoenstatt Jubilee Celebration

After the success of the youth festival the prior year, it became obvious that there should be something to bring together each year the youth of the world, around the original shrine. During 2006, volunteers from Germany, Mexico, the United States, Poland, Puerto Rico, Chile, Argentina, Portugal, and Kenya, worked together to create a month-long program for young pilgrims from all over the world. This was the first of many Schoenstatt Summers. The Night of the Shrine was the conclusion of this month-long program. At midnight on 27 August, over 400 people gathered for Mass around the original shrine. Together with them, the youth of the world in more than 90 shrines, spread around five continents, celebrated this Mass at the same moment. Each shrine celebrated in their own way, according to the traditions of their country, this World Youth Mass.

== Schoenstatt in the Vatican ==
Fr. Alexandre Awi Mello, Advisor to the Pontifical Commission for Latin America -CAL. Former Secretary of the Dicastery of Laity, Family and Life. He is a member of the Secular Institute of the Schoenstatt Fathers.

== Members Proposed for Canonization ==
Servant of God Fr. Joseph Kentenich (1885–1968), German Founder of the Schoenstatt Movement.

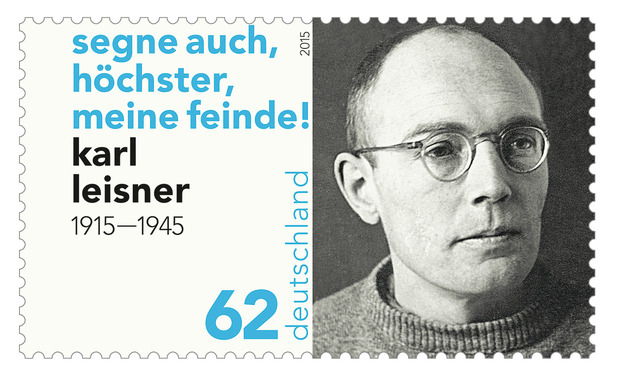
Blessed Karl Leisner

Blessed Karl Leisner (1915–1945), German priest and martyr

He died of tuberculosis after being freed from the Dachau concentration camp. He has been declared a martyr and was beatified by Pope John Paul II on 23 June 1996.

Blessed Gerhard Hirschfelder (1907-1942), German priest and martyr

He was a vocal critic of Nazism, and therefore imprisoned by the Nazi-Regime in the Dachau concentration camp, where he encountered the Schoenstatt Movement. He died due to starvation and pneumonia in 1942.

Blessed Alois Andritzki (1914 - 1943) priest and martyr

He was a German diocesan priest. He was sent to the Dachau concentration camp for being critical of the Nazi regime. There he participated in the first group of Schoenstatt priests. When he fell ill, he was killed by lethal injection. He was beatified on 13 June 2011 by Benedict XVI.

Venerable Emilie Engel (1983-1955), German, Schoenstatt Sister of Mary

She was one of the first Schoenstatt Sisters of Mary, Institute founded in 1926. She suffered a traumatic childhood, and through her encounter with Schoenstatt and Father Kentenich, "her anxiety was transformed into peace and passion for a mission." She died in 1955 as a result of complications from a severe illness and disability that spanned decades.

Venerable Mario Hiriart (1931–1964), Chilean

He was a part of the Institute of the Brothers of Mary and dedicated his life to spiritual formation and to the growth of the Schoenstatt Movement. He died of terminal cancer at the age of 32.

Venerable John Pozzobon (1904-1985), Brazilian deacon

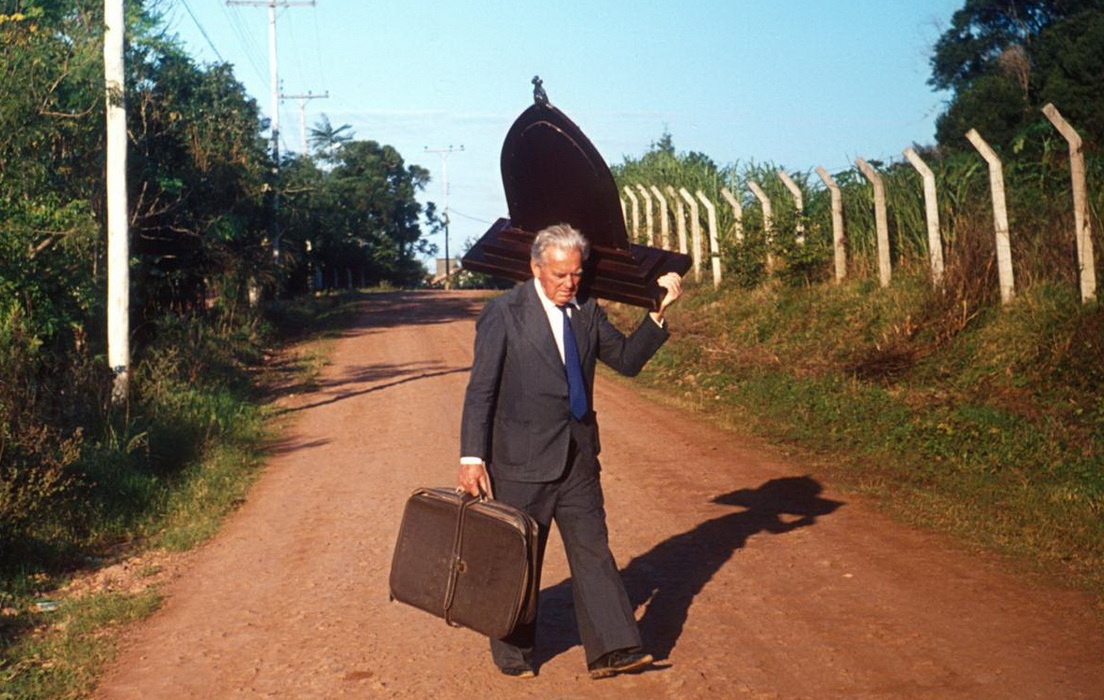
Don Joao de Pozzobon, founder of the Pilgrim Mother Apostolate, carrying an image of the Mother Thrice Admirable.

He was the founder of the Pilgrim Mother Apostolate (also known as the Pilgrim Mother Campaign or Rosary Campaign). In 1950 he was entrusted with a replica of the Mater Ter Admirabilis picture, so that he could evangelize and pray the rosary with families. With this image of the Pilgrim Mother of Schoenstatt (weighing 25 lbs, or 11 kg), Don Joao Pozzobon visited schools, prisons, hospitals, and homes, travelling more than 87,000 miles (140,000 km) in his almost 40 years of apostolate. Copies of Pozzobon's pilgrim image were made, in a smaller size, and have now been used throughout the world to evangelize millions of people through what is now known as the Pilgrim Mother Apostolate.

Servant of God Joseph Engling (1898–1918), German

He was a young seminarian in the early Schoenstatt Movement and was sent to the battlefield during World War I. In Cambrai, France, he sacrificed himself for other soldiers to bring them food and was killed by a detonating grenade. In Schoenstatt, Joseph Engling is seen as being an example of "heroic sanctity".

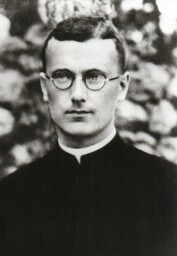
Servant of God Franz Reinisch

Servant of God Franz Reinisch (1903–1942), German priest and martyr

For refusing to take the oath of allegiance to Hitler, Fr. Franz Reinisch, a Schoenstatt priest, was executed by beheading by the Nazi regime.

Servant of God Gertrud von Bullion (1891-1930), German

She visited Schoenstatt in 1919 and in December 1920 sealed her consecration. This act is considered the foundation of the Women's Federation and the beginning of the women's communities in Schoenstatt. In 1921 she became ill with tuberculosis, which led to her death in 1930. In 1929 she had offered her life for the fruitfulness of the Movement.

Servant of God Fr. Hernán Alessandri Morandé (1935-2007), Chilean priest

In 1983, he founded the María Ayuda Charitable Corporation, which took care of abandoned children in the streets. The María Ayuda Corporation currently has "20 social programs throughout the country, where around 1700 children and adolescents who have suffered violations of their rights are sheltered."

== Bishops of the Schoenstatt Movement ==
Cardinal Francisco Javier Errázuriz Ossa, Archbishop of Santiago from 1998 to 2010. He has been a cardinal since 2001, was a member of Pope Francis' Council of Cardinal Advisers from its creation in 2013 until 2018, and was president of CELAM, Latin American Bishops Council, from 2003 to 2007. He was president of the Fifth General Conference of the Latin American Bishops Council in Aparecida, Brazil, from 13 to 31 May 2007. He is a member of the Secular Institute of Schoenstatt Fathers.

Archbishop Ignazio Sanna, President Emeritus of the Pontifical Academy of Theology. He is a member of the Schoenstatt Institute of Diocesan Priests. He was president of the Academy from June 3, 2019 to August 6, 2022.

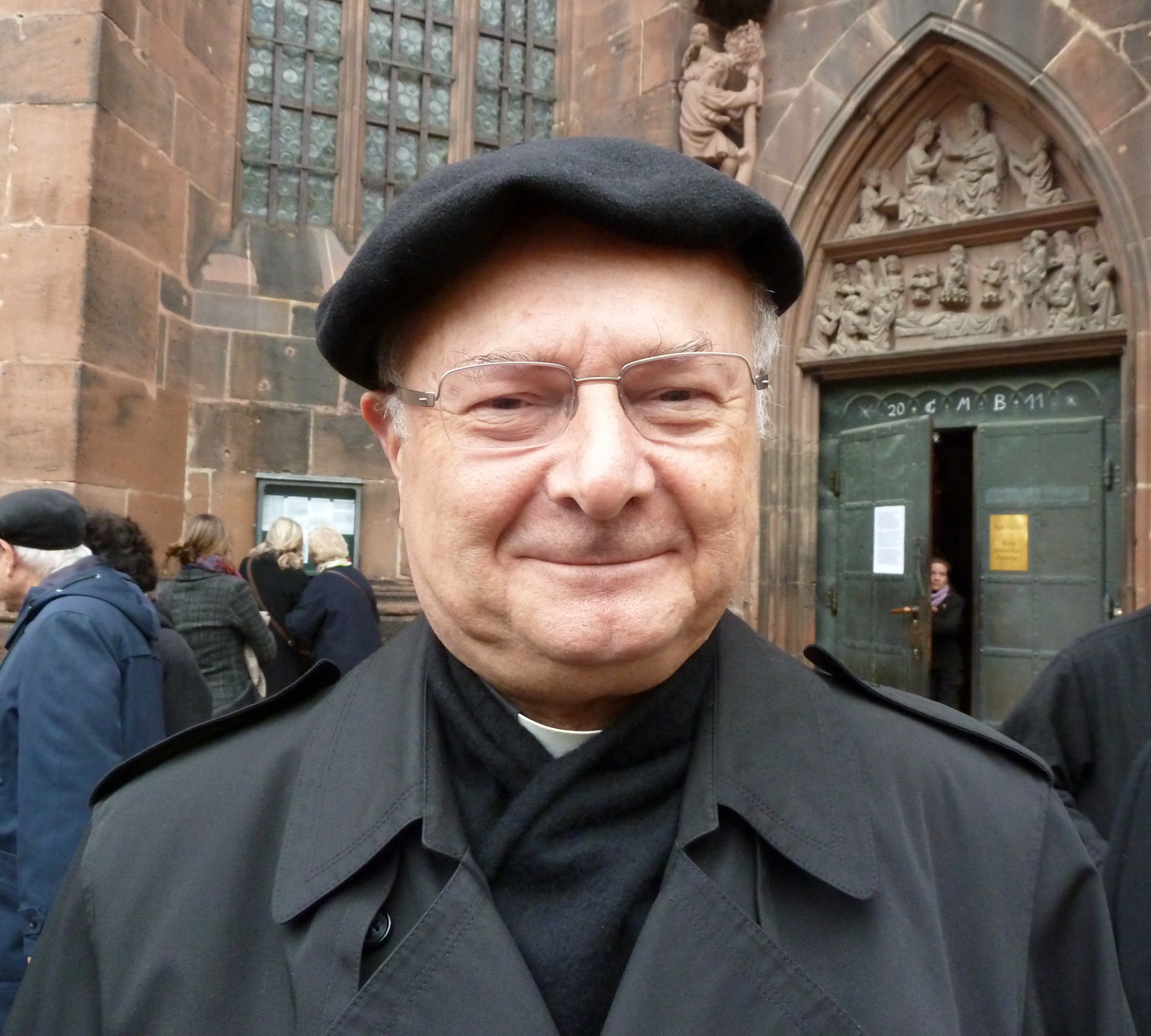
Robert Zollitsch, former Chairman of the German Episcopal Conference

Archbishop Robert Zollitsch, Archbishop of Freiburg im Breisgau from 2003 to 2013, Chairman of the German Episcopal Conference from 2008 to 2014. He is a member of the Schoenstatt Institute of Diocesan Priests.

Bishop Michael Gerber, Bishop of Fulda, Germany. He is a member of the Schoenstatt Institute of Diocesan Priests.

Bishop Rafael Bernaski, Bishop of Blumenau, Brazil. He is a member of the Schoenstatt Federation of Priests.

Bishop Francisco Pistilli Scorzara, Bishop of Encarnación, Paraguay. He is a member of the Secular Institute of Schoenstatt Fathers.

Bishop Andrés Napoleón Romero Cárdenas, Bishop of Barahona, Dominican Republic. He is a member of the Schoenstatt Institute of Diocesan Priests.

Bishop Reinaldo Nann, former Bishop of Caravelí, Peru. He is a member of the Schoenstatt Institute of Diocesan Priests.

Bishop Nicolas Nadji Bab, Bishop of Lai, Chad. He is a member of the Schoenstatt Federation of Priests.

Bishop Giovani Edgar Arana, Bishop of El Alto, Bolivia. He is a member of the Schoenstatt Federation of Priests.

Bishop Ramón Benito Ángeles Fernández, Auxiliary Bishop of Santo Domingo, Dominican Republic. He is a member of the Schoenstatt Institute of Diocesan Priests.

Bishop Manuel Camilo Vial Risopatrón, Bishop of Temuco, Chile, from 2001 to 2013. He is a member of the Secular Institute of Schoenstatt Fathers.

Bishop Jorge González, Auxiliary Bishop of La Plata, Argentina. He is member of the Schoenstatt Federation of Priests.

Bishop Claudio Giménez, Bishop Emeritus of Caacupé, Paraguay, was twice president of the Conference of Bishops of Paraguay. He is a member of the Secular Institute of Schoenstatt Fathers.

Bishop Basilio Mamani Quispe, Auxiliary Bishop of La Paz, Bolivia. He is member of the Schoenstatt Federation of Priests.

Bishop Dr. Fausto Ramón Mejía Vallejo, Bishop Emeritus of San Francisco de Macorís, Dominican Republic. He is a member of the Schoenstatt Institute of Diocesan Priests.

Bishop Ernesto Fernández, Auxiliary Bishop of Rosario, Argentina. He is a member of the Schoenstatt Institute of Diocesan Priests.

== Schoenstatt Shrines by country ==
The Schoenstatt Shrine is the center of a Schoenstatt community in a certain region (there are 207 around the world). Additionally, Schoenstatt's Pilgrim Mother Apostolate has reached millions of people around the world. Some countries where the Schoenstatt Movement is present:

Flag	Country	Number of Schoenstatt Shrines
Argentina	Argentina	20
Australia	Australia	3
Austria	Austria	1
Bolivia	Bolivia	1
Brazil	Brazil	23
Burundi	Burundi	2
Chile	Chile	25
Colombia	Colombia	2
Costa Rica	Costa Rica	1
Croatia	Croatia	2
Czech Republic	Czech Republic	1
Dominican Republic	Dominican Republic	2
Ecuador	Ecuador	4
France	France	1
Germany	Germany	56
Hungary	Hungary	1
India	India	6
Italy	Italy	2
Mexico	Mexico	6
Nigeria	Nigeria	1
Paraguay	Paraguay	3
Peru	Peru	2
Philippines	Philippines	1
Poland	Poland	6
Portugal	Portugal	4
Puerto Rico	Puerto Rico	4
South Africa	South Africa	5
Spain	Spain	3
Switzerland	Switzerland	7
Tanzania	Tanzania	1
United Kingdom	United Kingdom	2
Uruguay	Uruguay	1
United States	United States	10

== See also ==
- Pilgrim Mother Campaign
- Schoenstatt Shrine
