= Pilgrim Mother Campaign =

Pilgrim Mother / Schoenstatt Rosary Campaign
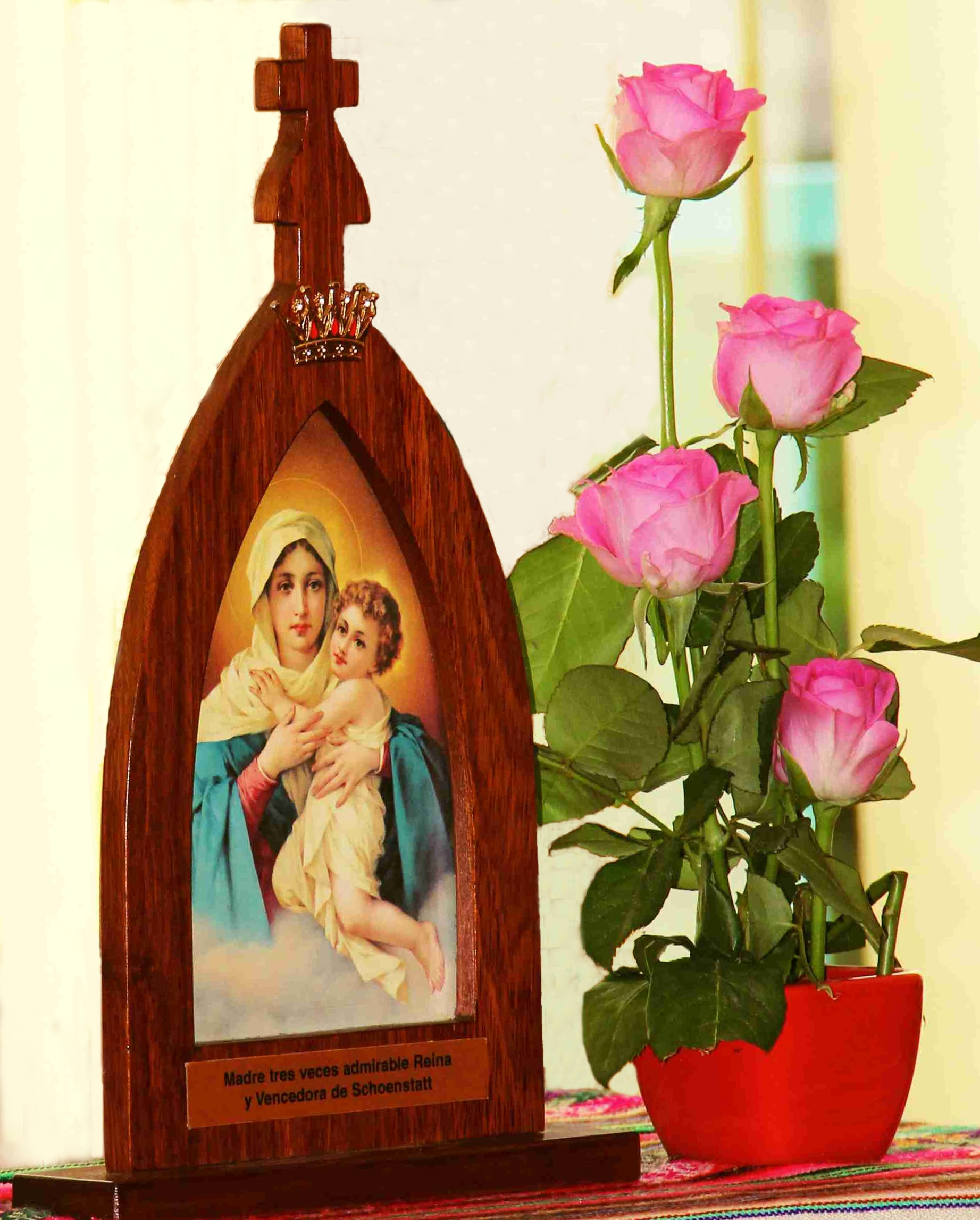
- The Pilgrim Mother of Schoenstatt Logo of the Schoenstatt Movement
- Formation: 10 September 1950
- Founder: Servant of God John Pozzobon
- Type: Catholic Lay Apostolate
- Purpose: Ministry of visitation of families, students, sick, elderly, prisoners, etc.
- Members: 30 million, in 120 nations (2017)

The Pilgrim Mother Campaign, also known as the Schoenstatt Rosary Campaign, is an apostolic work founded by the Servant of God John Pozzobon and coordinated by the Schoenstatt Movement, counting presently more than 30 million members in over one million groups spanning 120 nations of the world.

== Overview ==
The Campaign consists in the regular visit of an image of the Mother Thrice Admirable of Schoenstatt Madonna to families, schools, hospitals and all places where families or people accept to receive her. It is carried out by lay volunteers - missionaries and coordinators - organized at the parish, diocesan, regional or linguistic levels.

The pilgrim image employed in the campaign is the same venerated in the Schoenstatt Shrines. They are replicas of the 'original pilgrim image' with which the campaign began and have the form of a sanctuary to express the essential link to the Schoenstatt Shrine and all the graces that there are received. They are blessed and sent from a Schoenstatt Shrine. The Secretariats of the Campaign of the Pilgrim Mother of Schoenstatt have the function of coordinating and help the missionaries in their work and relationship with dioceses and parishes.

== History ==
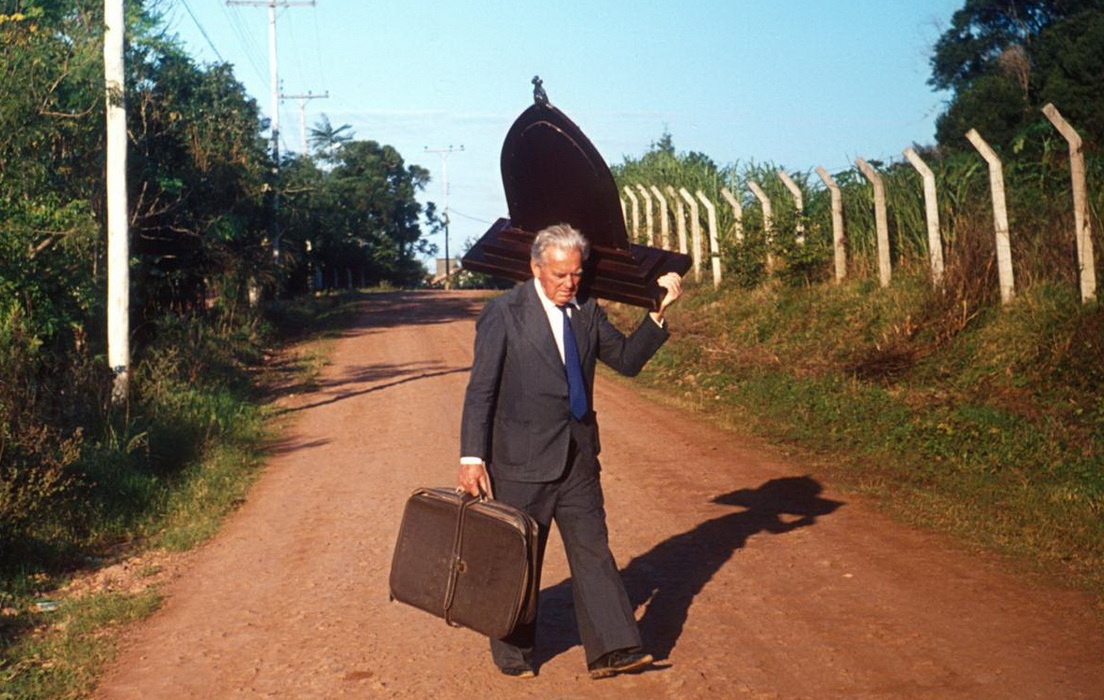
The Campaign's founder, John Pozzobon, carrying the Original Pilgrim Image to a village on foot, as he habitually did

It was initiated by the Servant of God, Deacon John Pozzobon, a Schoenstatt Movement's member, on 10 September 1950. Feeling an inner call to get involved in some apostolate with Our Lady, he receives an invitation from Sister Teresinha Gobbo, from the Secular Institute of Schoenstatt Sisters of Mary, to bring the image of the Mother, Queen and Winner Thrice Admirable of Schoenstatt to visit the families. Sister Teresinha entrusts him the image that had been blessed at the Schoenstatt Shrine of Santa Maria (Brazil) by Father Celestino Trevisan, telling him: "This image will be under your care. You don't need to pray the rosary every night. You should only take care that it peregrinates from home to home."

John accepted this invitation. He assumes the task of taking the Pilgrim Mother of Schoenstatt to the families and exercises this mission for 35 years until the date of his death on 27 June 1985. With her, he travels over 87,000 miles carrying the Madonna picture in a shrine-shaped frame weighing over 25 pounds.

From 1959, the Campaign multiplies through smaller replicas of the Pilgrim Mother to visit families monthly. In 1979, Pozzobon visits Germany and Rome, and the Pilgrim Mother Campaign takes an international dimension.

== Theological Rationale ==
The Campaign is inspired by the attitude of Mary who went to visit her cousin Elizabeth (Luke 1: 39-41). It is an ecclesial ministry that the Church and the service of the Church, wants to collaborate with the ordinary pastoral care of parishes.

It is a popular apostolic work, as it seeks to reach all people in all situations of life, adapting to different pastoral realities: families, schools, hospitals, prisons, etc., following Jesus command: "Go into all the world and preach the Gospel to every creature" (Mark 16: 15).

Another source of inspiration is the idea of the universal apostolic work according to Saint Vincent Pallotti regarding Mary: "She is the great Missionary; She works miracles". It also performs a will of the founder of the Schoenstatt Movement, Fr. Joseph Kentenich, expressed in 1948, to bring the Mother of God to the homes and give Her a place of honor, for that they become small shrines.

Walking the pilgrimage way with Mary means, Father Kentenich argued, being drawn into Mary's mission by bearing, bringing, and serving Christ. becoming another Mary: "Each of us bears a large share of the responsibility for the form that the world will take in the future. If this future—regardless of the specific characteristics it will have — is to bear the resemblance of Christ, then Mary must step more into the foreground and be acknowledged everywhere as the official Christ-giver, Christ-bearer, and Christ-bringer."

== Modalities ==
There are various types of "pilgrim images", according to the ministry on which they are used:

=== The Original Pilgrim Image ===
It is the image with which Deacon John Pozzobon began the Pilgrim Mother Campaign in September 1950. This image was his 'pilgrimage companion' for more than 30 years. In 1980, he returned it to Sr. Terezinha Gobbo. Since Pozzobon's death, in 1985, the Pilgrim Original is kept in the Marian Center, home of the Schoenstatt Movement in Santa Maria (Brazil).

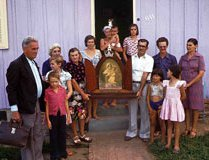
Pozzobon with the Pilgrim Mother visiting a peasant family

=== Auxiliary Pilgrim Images ===
They are the images intended for a diocese, a diocesan shrine or a more specific apostolic work. The first one was received by Ubaldo Pimentel, also from Santa Maria (Brazil), on 8 December 1979. They are exact replicas of the original Pilgrim Image. According to interpretation of Deacon John Pozzobon, the Auxiliary Images are like an 'extension' of Fr. Kentenich's blessing to the Campaign, on 4 August 1951. As an expression of their union with the 'Original', all 'Auxiliaries' are blessed and sent from the Schoenstatt Shrine of Santa Maria, where the campaign began.

=== Parish Pilgrim Images ===
Similar to the Original image and the Auxiliaries, but made in a smaller size and without the doors covering the picture of Mary. Each parish can have its image to use it in novenas, processions and other activities. Some parishes organize an itinerary for its parish image, where it visits the various chapels, schools, church groups, etc. Normally, the parish pilgrim image is under the care of the parish coordination team, which may delegate responsibility to a leadership campaign.

=== 'Occasional' Pilgrim Images ===
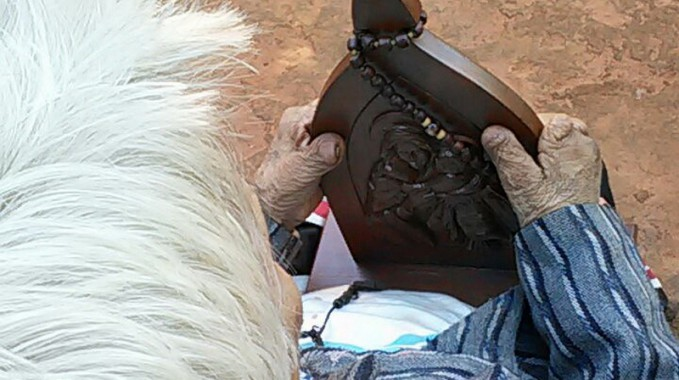
A Pilgrim Mother image for the blind

Used in various apostolic works of the Campaign of the Pilgrim Mother of Schoenstatt: the sick, in shops, hospitals, prisons, etc. They are entrusted to a missionary who organizes the itinerary and the form of ministry. All images are registered with the national secretariat of the Campaign.

=== Pilgrim Images for Families ===
The most known and used in the world by the Campaign, they circulate monthly and on a permanent basis a group of families. Each image is in the care of a missionary, responsible for the image in his group. All have a number registered in the secretariat responsible for the geographic area.

=== Pilgrim Images for Children and Youth ===
They are entrusted to young people and children who are placed as apostles for other young people and children. They can also be used in schools and catechism groups. All images used in this ministry are registered with the secretariat of the Campaign.

== Pilgrim Mother Campaign per country ==
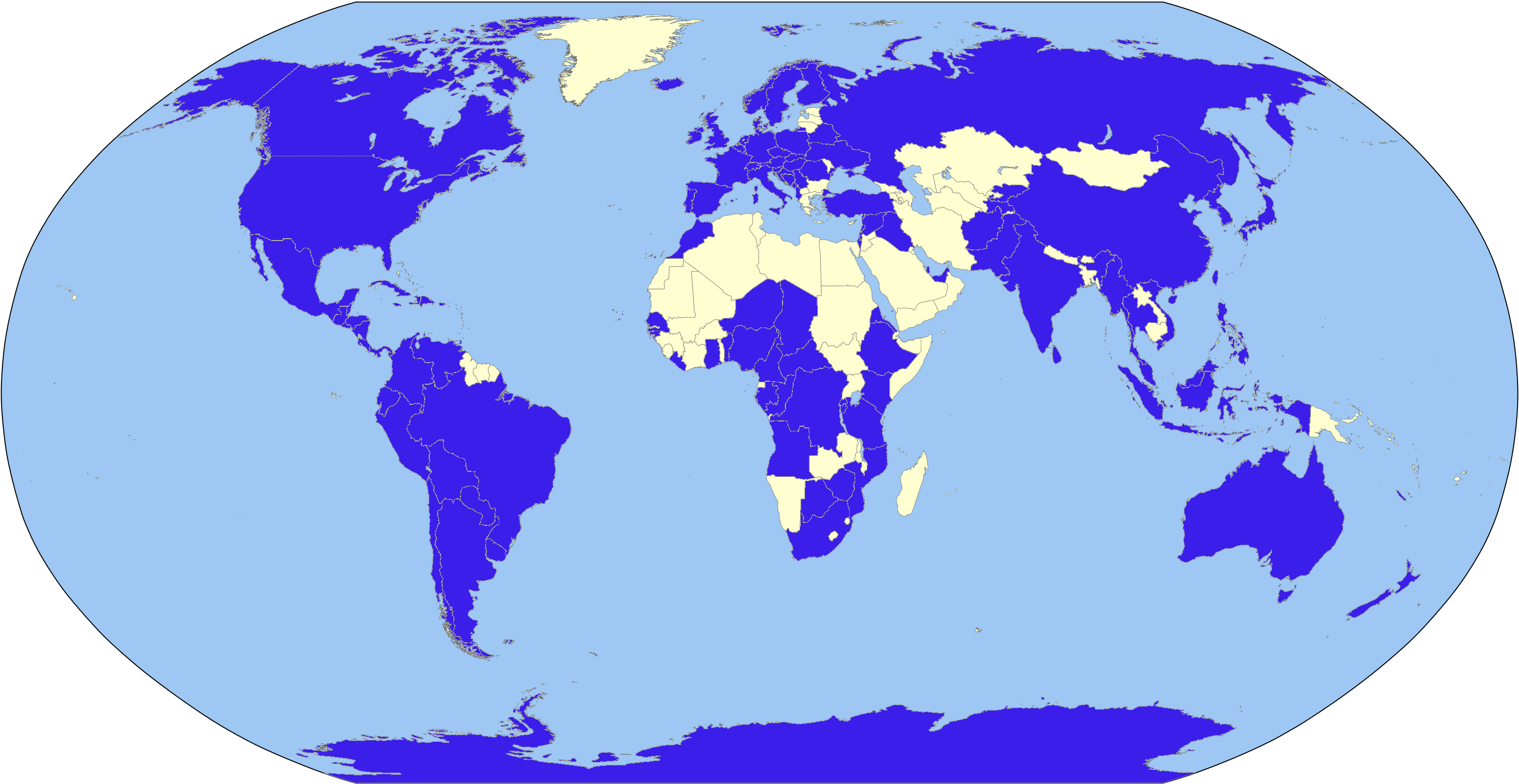
Countries where the Pilgrim Mother Campaign is present in the world (in blue)

This list follows the geoscheme created by the United Nations Statistics Division. According to the UN, the assignment of countries or areas to specific groupings is for statistical convenience and does not imply any assumption regarding political or other affiliation of countries or territories.

Some countries may have more than one website on this list, for linguistic or organizational reasons. Others, for the same reasons, may share a single site.

Countries with the field "website" in blank mean that the country doesn't have a webpage dedicated exclusively to the Campaign's Secretariat.

Source of the data: Pilgrim Mother Campaign Secretariat from Brazil for Southern and Southeastern regions and German-speaking Secretariat from Switzerland, except where another source be expressly indicated.

=== Africa ===
Flag	Name	Campaign	Website
Algeria	Algeria	No	
Angola	Angola	Yes	
Benin	Benin	Yes	
Botswana	Botswana	No	
Burkina Faso	Burkina Faso	Yes	
Burundi	Burundi	Yes	
Cameroon	Cameroon	Yes	
Cape Verde	Cape Verde (Cabo Verde)	Yes	
Central African Republic	Central African Republic	Yes	
Chad	Chad	Yes	
Comoros	Comoros	No	
Republic of the Congo	Congo (Congo-Brazzaville)	Yes	
Democratic Republic of the Congo	Democratic Republic of the Congo (Congo-Kinshasa)	Yes	
Djibouti	Djibouti	No	
Egypt	Egypt	No	
Equatorial Guinea	Equatorial Guinea	No	
Eritrea	Eritrea	Yes	
Eswatini	Eswatini	No	
Ethiopia	Ethiopia	Yes	
Gabon	Gabon	Yes	
The Gambia	Gambia	No	
Ghana	Ghana	Yes	
Guinea	Guinea	No	
Guinea-Bissau	Guinea-Bissau	Yes	
Ivory Coast	Ivory Coast (Côte d'Ivoire)	No	
Kenya	Kenya	Yes	
Lesotho	Lesotho	No	
Liberia	Liberia	Yes	
Libya	Libya	No	
Madagascar	Madagascar	No	
Malawi	Malawi	No	
Mali	Mali	No	
Mauritania	Mauritania	No	
Mauritius	Mauritius	No	
Mayotte	Mayotte (France)	No	
Morocco	Morocco	Yes	
Mozambique	Mozambique	Yes	
Namibia	Namibia	No	
Niger	Niger	Yes	
Nigeria	Nigeria	Yes	
Réunion	Réunion (France)	No	
Rwanda	Rwanda	Yes	
Saint Helena, Ascension and Tristan da Cunha	Saint Helena, Ascension and Tristan da Cunha (United Kingdom)	No	
São Tomé and Príncipe	São Tomé and Príncipe	No	
Senegal	Senegal	Yes	
Seychelles	Seychelles	No	
Sierra Leone	Sierra Leone	No	
Somalia	Somalia	No	
South Africa	South Africa	Yes	
South Sudan	South Sudan	No	
Sudan	Sudan	No	
Tanzania	Tanzania	Yes	
Togo	Togo	No	
Tunisia	Tunisia	No	
Uganda	Uganda	No	
Zambia	Zambia	No	
Zimbabwe	Zimbabwe	Yes	

=== Americas ===
Flag	Name	Campaign	Website
Anguilla	Anguilla (United Kingdom)	No	
Antigua and Barbuda	Antigua and Barbuda	No	
Argentina	Argentina	Yes	
Aruba	Aruba (Netherlands)	No	
The Bahamas	Bahamas	No	
Barbados	Barbados	Yes	
Belize	Belize	Yes	
Bermuda	Bermuda (United Kingdom)	No	
Bolivia	Bolivia	Yes	
Bonaire	Bonaire (Netherlands)	No	
Brazil	Brazil	Yes	National Secretariat; Secretariat for Northeastern and Southern Regions
British Virgin Islands	British Virgin Islands (United Kingdom)	No	
Canada	Canada	Yes	
Cayman Islands	Cayman Islands (United Kingdom)	No	
Chile	Chile	Yes	National Secretariat
Clipperton Island	Clipperton Island (France)	No	
Colombia	Colombia	Yes	National Secretariat
Costa Rica	Costa Rica	Yes	National Secretariat
Cuba	Cuba	Yes	
Curaçao	Curaçao (Netherlands)	No	
Dominica	Dominica	No	
Dominican Republic	Dominican Republic	Yes	
El Salvador	El Salvador	Yes	
Ecuador	Ecuador	Yes	National Secretariat
Falkland Islands	Falkland Islands	No	
French Guiana	French Guiana (France)	No	
Greenland	Greenland	No	
Grenada	Grenada	No	
Guadeloupe	Guadeloupe (France)	No	
Guatemala	Guatemala	Yes	
Guyana	Guyana	No	
Haiti	Haiti	Yes	
Honduras	Honduras	Yes	
Jamaica	Jamaica	Yes	
Martinique	Martinique (France)	Yes	
Mexico	Mexico	Yes	
Montserrat	Montserrat (United Kingdom)	No	
Navassa Island	Navassa Island (United States)	No	
Nicaragua	Nicaragua	Yes	
Panama	Panama	Yes	
Paraguay	Paraguay	Yes	National Secretariat
Peru	Peru	Yes	
Puerto Rico	Puerto Rico	Yes	
Saba (island)	Saba (Netherlands)	No	
Saint Barthélemy	Saint Barthélemy (France)	No	
Saint Kitts and Nevis	Saint Kitts and Nevis	No	
Saint Lucia	Saint Lucia	No	
Collectivity of Saint Martin	Saint Martin (France)	No	
Saint Pierre and Miquelon	Saint Pierre and Miquelon (France)	No	
Saint Vincent and the Grenadines	Saint Vincent and the Grenadines	No	
Sint Eustatius	Sint Eustatius (Netherlands)	No	
Sint Maarten	Sint Maarten (Netherlands)	No	
South Georgia and the South Sandwich Islands	South Georgia and the South Sandwich Islands	No	
Suriname	Suriname	No	
Trinidad and Tobago	Trinidad and Tobago	No	
Turks and Caicos Islands	Turks and Caicos Islands (United Kingdom)	No	
United States	United States of America	Yes	National Secretariat
United States Virgin Islands	United States Virgin Islands (United States)	No	National Secretariat
Uruguay	Uruguay	Yes	National Secretariat
Venezuela	Venezuela	Yes	

=== Asia ===
Flag	Name	Campaign	Website
Afghanistan	Afghanistan	Yes	
Akrotiri and Dhekelia	Akrotiri and Dhekelia (United Kingdom)	No	
Armenia	Armenia	No	
Azerbaijan	Azerbaijan	No	
Bahrain	Bahrain	No	
Bangladesh	Bangladesh	No	
Bhutan	Bhutan	No	
British Indian Ocean Territory	British Indian Ocean Territory (United Kingdom)	No	
Brunei	Brunei	No	
Cambodia	Cambodia	No	
China	China	Yes	
Christmas Island	Christmas Island (Australia)	No	
Cocos (Keeling) Islands	Cocos (Keeling) Islands (Australia)	No	
Cyprus	Cyprus	No	
Timor-Leste	East Timor (Timor-Leste)	Yes	
Georgia (country)	Georgia	No	
Hong Kong	Hong Kong (China)	Yes	
India	India	Yes	Secretariat
Indonesia	Indonesia	Yes	
Iran	Iran	No	
Iraq	Iraq	Yes	
Israel	Israel	Yes	
Japan	Japan	Yes	
Jordan	Jordan	No	
Kazakhstan	Kazakhstan	No	
Kuwait	Kuwait	No	
Kyrgyzstan	Kyrgyzstan	Yes	
Laos	Laos	No	
Lebanon	Lebanon	Yes	
Macau	Macau (China)	Yes	
Malaysia	Malaysia	Yes	
Maldives	Maldives	No	
Mongolia	Mongolia	No	
Myanmar	Myanmar (Burma)	No	
(Nepal)	Nepal	No	
North Korea	North Korea	Yes	
Oman	Oman	No	
Pakistan	Pakistan	Yes	
Palestine	Palestine	Yes	
Philippines	Philippines	Yes	
Qatar	Qatar	Yes	
Saudi Arabia	Saudi Arabia	No	
Singapore	Singapore	Yes	
South Korea	South Korea	Yes	
Sri Lanka	Sri Lanka	Yes	
Syria	Syria	Yes	
Taiwan	Taiwan (China)	Yes	
Tajikistan	Tajikistan	Yes	
Thailand	Thailand	Yes	
Turkey	Turkey	Yes	
Turkmenistan	Turkmenistan	No	
United Arab Emirates	United Arab Emirates	Yes	
Uzbekistan	Uzbekistan	No	
Vietnam	Vietnam	Yes	
Yemen	Yemen	No	

Notes

- Transcontinental countries in Europe and Asia, classified as Eastern European countries by the United Nations Statistics Division:
  Russia.

=== Europe ===
Flag	Name	Campaign	Website
Åland	Åland (Finland)	No	
Albania	Albania	Yes	
Andorra	Andorra	Yes	
Austria	Austria	Yes	National Secretariat
Belarus	Belarus	Yes	
Belgium	Belgium	Yes	National Secretariat
Bosnia and Herzegovina	Bosnia and Herzegovina	Yes	
Bulgaria	Bulgaria	No	
Croatia	Croatia	Yes	National Secretariat
Czech Republic	Czech Republic	Yes	National Secretariat
Denmark	Denmark	Yes	
Estonia	Estonia	No	
Faroe Islands	Faroe Islands (Denmark)	No	
Finland	Finland	Yes	
France	France	Yes	Regional Secretariat for French-speaking countries; Secretariat for Cambrai
Germany	Germany	Yes	National Secretariat; Secretariat for Czech and Polish-speaking groups
Gibraltar	Gibraltar (United Kingdom)	No	
Greece	Greece	No	
Guernsey	Guernsey (United Kingdom)	No	
Hungary	Hungary	Yes	National Secretariat
Iceland	Iceland	Yes	
Republic of Ireland	Ireland	Yes	
Isle of Man	Isle of Man (United Kingdom)	No	
Italy	Italy	Yes	National Secretariat; Regional Secretariat for Sicily
Norway	Jan Mayen (Norway)	No	
Jersey	Jersey (United Kingdom)	No	
Latvia	Latvia	No	
Liechtenstein	Liechtenstein	Yes	Secretariat for the German-speaking Switzerland and Liechtenstein
Lithuania	Lithuania	No	
Luxembourg	Luxembourg	Yes	Secretariat from Germany
Malta	Malta	Yes	
Moldova	Moldova	No	
(Monaco)	Monaco	No	
Montenegro	Montenegro	Yes	
Netherlands	Netherlands	Yes	
Norway	Norway	Yes	
North Macedonia	North Macedonia	No	
Poland	Poland	Yes	National Secretariat
Portugal	Portugal	Yes	Mission for the University Students
Romania	Romania	Yes	National Secretariat (Romanian/Hungarian)
Russia	Russia	Yes	
San Marino	San Marino	Yes	Secretariat for San Marino and Italy
Serbia	Serbia	Yes	
Slovakia	Slovakia	Yes	Secretariat for Western and Central Slovakia
Slovenia	Slovenia	Yes	
Spain	Spain	Yes	National Secretariat; Secretariat for Catalonia
Svalbard	Svalbard (Norway)	No	
Sweden	Sweden	Yes	National Secretariat
(Switzerland)	Switzerland	Yes	French-speaking Secretariat; German-speaking Secretariat; Italian, Croatian and Polish-speaking Secretariat; Portuguese-speaking Secretariat; Spanish-speaking Secretariat
Ukraine	Ukraine	Yes	
United Kingdom	United Kingdom	Yes	UK Secretariat; Secretariat for Scotland
(Vatican City)	Vatican City/Holy See	Yes	

Notes

  - Transcontinental countries in Europe and Asia, classified as West Asian countries by the United Nations Statistics Division: Azerbaijan, Georgia, Kazakhstan, Turkey.
  - Entirely in West Asia, but commonly associated with Europe and a member of the Council of Europe: Armenia, Cyprus.

=== Oceania ===
Flag	Name	Campaign	Website
American Samoa	American Samoa (United States)	No	
Ashmore and Cartier Islands	Ashmore and Cartier Islands (Australia)	No	
Australia	Australia	Yes	National Secretariat
Baker Island	Baker Island (United States)	No	
Cook Islands	Cook Islands	No	
Coral Sea Islands	Coral Sea Islands (Australia)	No	
Fiji	Fiji	No	
French Polynesia	French Polynesia (France)	No	
Guam	Guam (United States)	No	
Howland Island	Howland Island (United States)	No	
Jarvis Island	Jarvis Island (United States)	No	
Johnston Atoll	Johnston Atoll (United States)	No	
Kingman Reef	Kingman Reef (United States)	No	
Kiribati	Kiribati	No	
Marshall Islands	Marshall Islands	No	
Federated States of Micronesia	Micronesia	No	
Midway Atoll	Midway Atoll (United States)	No	
Nauru	Nauru	No	
New Caledonia	New Caledonia (Sui generis collectivity of France)	Yes	
New Zealand	New Zealand	Yes	Campaign's representative
Niue	Niue	No	
Norfolk Island	Norfolk Island (Australia)	No	
Northern Mariana Islands	Northern Mariana Islands (United States)	No	
Palau	Palau	Yes	
Palmyra Atoll	Palmyra Atoll (United States)	No	
Papua New Guinea	Papua New Guinea	No	
Pitcairn Islands	Pitcairn Islands (United Kingdom)	No	
Samoa	Samoa	No	
Solomon Islands	Solomon Islands	No	
Tokelau	Tokelau (New Zealand)	No	
Tonga	Tonga	No	
Tuvalu	Tuvalu	No	
Vanuatu	Vanuatu	No	
Wake Island	Wake Island (United States)	No	
Wallis and Futuna	Wallis and Futuna (France)	No	

=== Antarctica ===
Antarctica, regulated by the Antarctic Treaty System, has no government and belongs to no country. It was there that a bronze image of the Mother Thrice Admirable of Schoenstatt was installed in 1984 at the Comandante Ferraz Antarctic Station, located at the King George Island, in the Admiralty Bay.

== See also ==
- Servant of God John Pozzobon;
- Schoenstatt Movement;
- Father Joseph Kentenich.
