= Emilie Engel =

German Catholic teacher and nun (1893-1955)

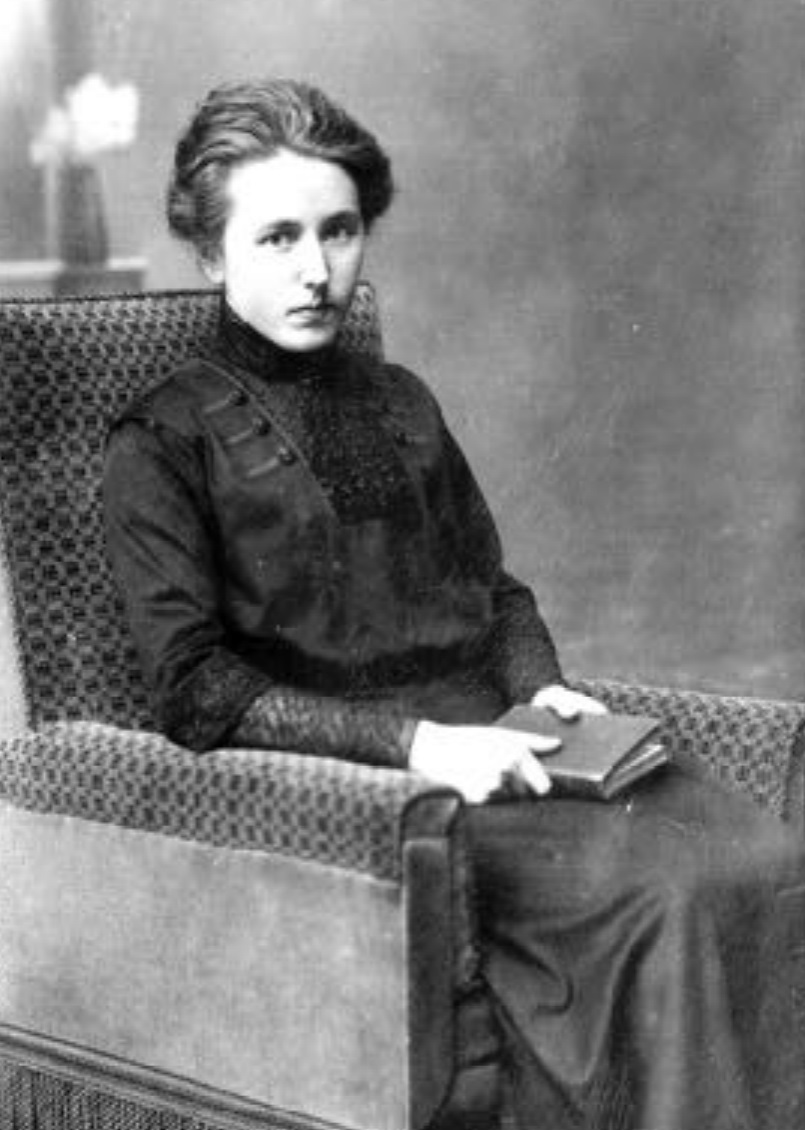
- Emilie Engel as a young teacher
- Born: 6 February 1893; Drolshagen
- Died: 20 November 1955 (aged 62); Koblenz
- Occupations: Catholic teacher, nun
- Known for: Pope Benedict XVI recognized her heroic virtue

Emilie Engel (born 6 February 1893 in Drolshagen – died 20 November 1955 in Koblenz) was a German Catholic teacher and nun. as provincial superior of the schoenstatt sisters of mary, she became a leading figure in the Schoenstatt Apostolic Movement. she died "with a reputation for holiness." a process for her beatification was initiated in 1999. On 10 May 2012, Pope Benedict XVI recognized her heroic virtue, granting her the title “Venerable.”

== Life ==
Emilie was the fourth of twelve children of the Engel farming family in Husten, in the predominantly Catholic Sauerland region. the family maintained a devout religious life. besides Emilie, three other sisters later joined the Schoenstatt sisters of Mary. the deaths of her five-month-old brother Albert in 1904 and her brother Josef in 1917 on the battlefield cast a shadow over her faith.

Against her parents' wishes, who wanted her to remain on the family farm, Emilie, like two of her sisters before her, chose to become a teacher in 1908. She attended the Higher Girls' School of the Poor School Sisters in Arnsberg for a year, where she was also class representative. This was followed by two years of preparatory classes and three years, graduating in 1914, at the teacher training college in Arnsberg. In 1915, she became a teacher at the Catholic elementary school Marienschule in Herne-Sodingen, where two of her sisters were already teaching.

During these years, she joined several prayer societies, a sign of her striving for holiness (diary entry, 1920). She spent much time in prayer before the tabernacle in the Sodingen parish church, where she found strength for her educational and charitable work.

== World War I ==
In Sodingen, she witnessed the precarious living conditions of large segments of the Ruhr population, which the First World War exacerbated into famine. The suffering she saw deeply affected her. With her sisters, she invited particularly disadvantaged children into their shared home, where they received games, tutoring, and food. she also placed orphans with families and arranged apprenticeships. she kept vigil at night for lonely, dying women. her dedication was contagious, inspiring her colleagues.

In 1921, at the first women's conference in Schoenstatt, she met Father Joseph Kentenich. He became her spiritual director and together they developed the idea of founding a female religious community, the later Schoenstatt Sisters of Mary. In December 1923, she organized the first women's conference in Sodingen. In 1925, she consecrated herself to the Blessed Virgin Mary in a personal ceremony. On 1 October 1926, she gave up her teaching career to devote herself entirely to building the new community within the Schoenstatt Movement, assuming its leadership as Vicar General.

Under Father Kentenich's influence, her fearful relationship with God, transformed into an unreserved trust in the providence of the Father. She consecrated herself to Him in a new act of devotion (the Covenant of Love) and entrusted Him with her future sufferings. Throughout her life, this faithful kindness inspired and encouraged others.

In 1928, she moved to Essen and took over the management of a care home. In 1929, she became Novice Mistress of the sisters of Mary. she carried out this role with maternal warmth, but also with clear principles. A total of 340 novices were shaped by her.

In 1935, she contracted tuberculosis; thus began her decades-long ordeal. she patiently endured agonizing treatments and operations. In 1946, she became Provincial Superior of the Western Province of her order, but withdrew from leadership in 1950. In 1951, she founded a training center for pastoral assistants. From 1952 onward, she was confined to a wheelchair. In the final stages of her life, she was almost completely paralyzed, but inwardly unbroken.

== Effects ==
Emilie Engel gave crucial impetus to the worldwide Schoenstatt Movement and the Sisters of Mary. Her grave at the Sisters' Provincial House in Koblenz-Metternich is frequently visited. A memorial plaque at her former residence in Herne-Sodingen, Mont-Cenis-Straße 284, has commemorated her work since 2005.

The process of beatification was opened on 12 October 1999 at the episcopal curia in Trier. On 10 May 2012, Pope Benedict XVI recognized her heroic virtue, granting her the title "Venerable." The cause remains open as of 2025, pending a miracle attributed to her intercession before beatification can proceed.
