= Gerhard Hirschfelder =

German Roman Catholic priest

Blessed Gerhard Hirschfelder

Martyr
- Born: 17 February 1907; Glatz, German Empire
- Died: 1 August 1942 (aged 35); Dachau concentration camp, Nazi Germany
- Venerated in: Roman Catholic Church
- Beatified: 19 September 2010, Münster Cathedral, Germany by Cardinal Joachim Meisner
- Feast: 2 August

Gerhard Hirschfelder (17 February 1907 – 1 August 1942) was a German Roman Catholic priest. He was a vocal critic of Nazism and used his sermons to condemn Nazi propaganda and other aspects of Nazism which drew suspicion on him from the authorities, who monitored and interrogated him. He was a staunch supporter of the role of adolescents in the life of the Church and made them a focus in his pastoral activities. He was imprisoned in the Dachau concentration camp, where he became a member of the Schoenstatt Movement; he died there probably of starvation and pneumonia.

Hirschfelder's beatification drew intense support after the priest died and 10,000 signatures were put to a petition in a request for his beatification; the formal cause began in the late 1990s and he became titled as a Servant of God. The beatification was celebrated on 19 September 2010 in Münster with Cardinal Joachim Meisner celebrating on the behalf of Pope Benedict XVI.

== Life ==
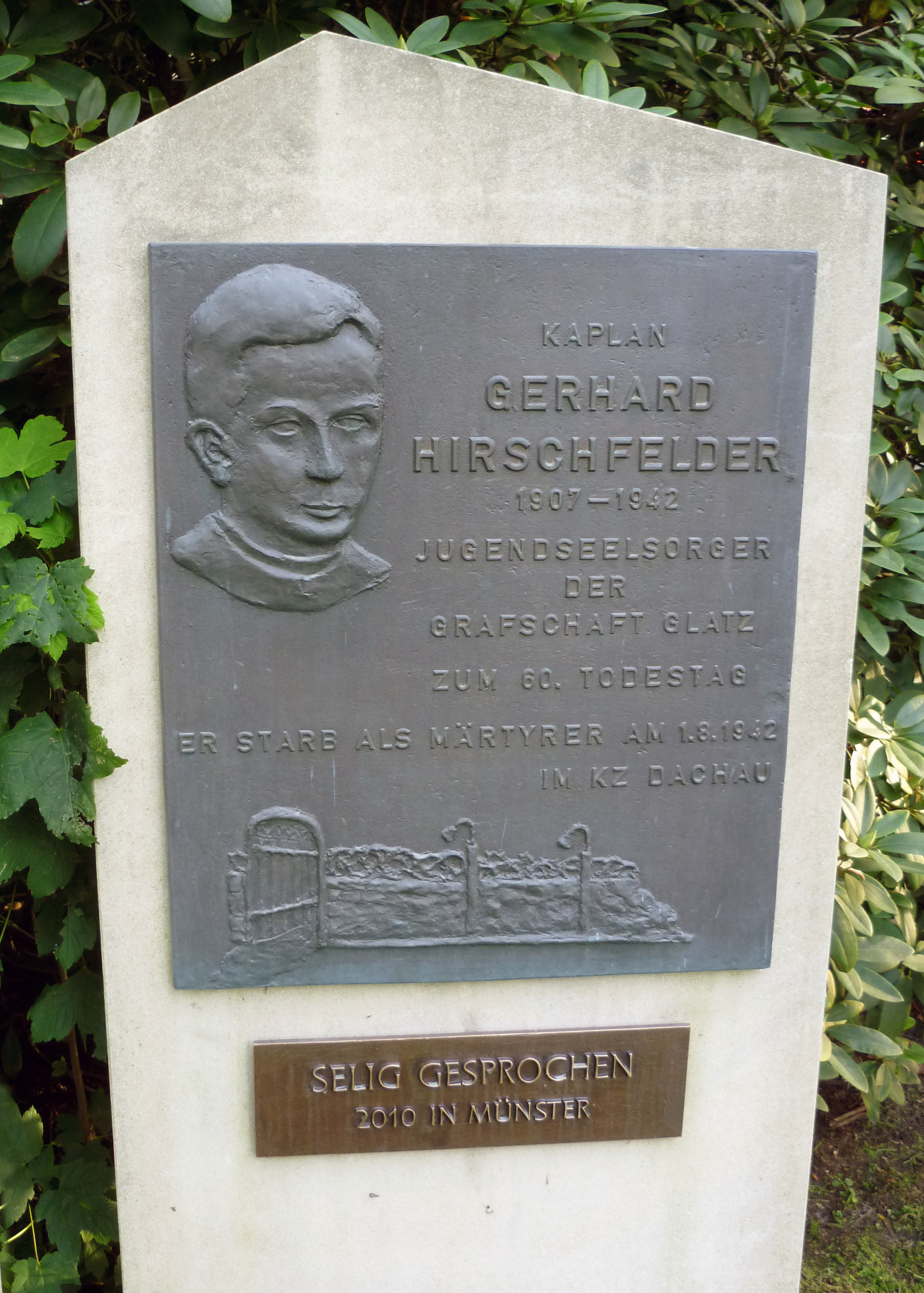
A commemorative plaque for Gerhard Hirschfelder in Telgte, Germany, saying that Hirschfelder served here as a chaplain for the youth

Gerhard Hirschfelder was born on 17 February 1907 as an illegitimate child to the unmarried Maria Hirschfelder. He received his baptism on 19 February from Father Bertmann in the Assumption parish.

He attended high school at the Glatz school (where he graduated in 1926) and then underwent his theological and philosophical studies at the University of Breslau. But his time there was often tarnished with the knowledge that he was an illegitimate child and he was sometimes ridiculed for that. Hirschfelder received his elevation into the diaconate on 29 December 1931 in the Breslau Cathedral from Cardinal Adolf Bertram. He received his ordination to the priesthood on 31 January 1932 from Cardinal Bertram. He celebrated his first Mass on 1 February 1932 in the church of the Sacred Heart of Jesus in Bad Langenau. He first served as a chaplain in a small parish until February 1939 when he was transferred to the Habelschwerdt parish. In July 1939 he was called to Glatz to work with adolescents and became a popular pastor and dominated his activism on the children and teenagers because he believed them to be the future of the Church.

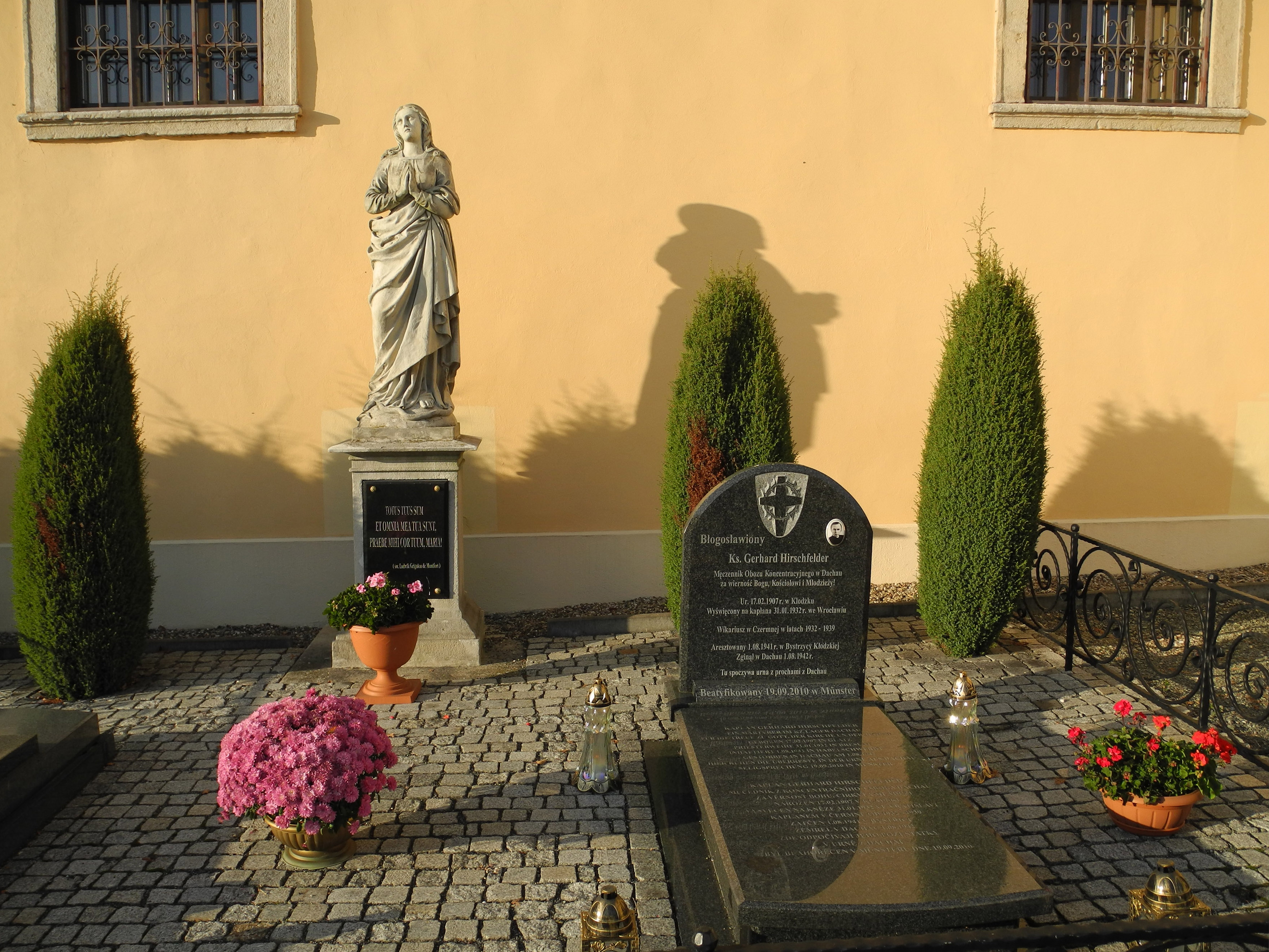
His grave in Tscherbeney, now Czermna in Poland

He worked with adolescents and discouraged them from joining the Hitler Youth movement and from being influenced by all the Nazi propaganda circulated at the time. He criticized Nazism in his sermons and was denounced as a result of this. In late July 1941 he condemned the destruction of Christian images and said: "He who tears from the heart of young people their faith in Christ is a criminal" and for this was arrested within a week on 1 August when he was taken to the Glatz prison. It was there at that prison that he wrote an intense and deep memoranda on the Via Crucis and a series on the Pauline letters as well as on the priesthood and marriage. He was sent straight to the Dachau concentration camp in mid-December 1941 (without a trial) where he received the prisoner number 28927; he arrived there on 27 December. While in Dachau he became a member of the Schoenstatt Movement. Hirschfelder was imprisoned in block 26/3 alongside the Oblate of Mary Immaculate priest Engelbert Rehling who said he was "almost timid" in his disposition as well as being quite humble.

Hirschfelder died on 1 August 1942 due to starvation coupled with acute pneumonia he had contracted. His remains were cremated and buried some weeks later though recovered; his official cause of death was never disclosed. His grave is located in the Tscherbeney cemetery (now Czermna in Poland).

== Beatification ==
There were 10 000 signatures collected asking officials in Münster and Rome to begin the cause for beatification. The beatification process opened in the Münster diocese in a diocesan process from 18 September 1998 until its closure in March 1999 though the formal introduction to the cause came under Pope John Paul II on 19 December 1998 once the Congregation for the Causes of Saints issued the "nihil obstat" and titled Hirschfelder as a Servant of God. The C.C.S. later validated this process on 15 October 1999 and received the Positio in 2002. Theologians approved the cause on 2 October 2009 as did the C.C.S. on 9 February 2010. Pope Benedict XVI approved that Hirschfelder died "in odium fidei" (in hatred of the faith) on 27 March 2010 and thus approved the beatification.

Cardinal Joachim Meisner presided over the beatification on the pope's behalf in the Münster Cathedral on 19 September 2010 with about 4000 people in attendance. The previous week on 13 September saw the pope reference the late priest to the German ambassador at Castel Gandolfo as one of hundreds of priests killed in concentration camps during World War II. Archbishop Erwin Josef Ender attended the beatification as did Dominik Duka and Bishop Felix Genn of Münster. Meisner said in his remarks that Hirschfelder placed his trust in "the power of faith".

The current postulator for the cause is Dr. Andrea Ambrosi.

== See also ==
- Priest Barracks of Dachau
- Kirchenkampf
