= Alexandre Awi Mello =

Alexandre Awi Mello (born 17 January 1971) ISch, is a Brazilian Catholic priest and professor, a member of the Secular Institute of Schoenstatt Fathers and the secretary of the Dicastery for Laity, Family and Life since his appointment by Pope Francis on 31 May 2017. He was previously national director of the Schoenstatt Movement in Brazil.

Awi Mello was born in Rio de Janeiro. He was ordained a priest on 7 July 2001 for the Schoenstatt Fathers. He served as a parochial vicar and Assessor of young people in the southeast and south of Brazil. He became national director of the Movement.

He completed his studies in philosophy and theology from the Pontifical Catholic University in Santiago de Chile. He earned a licence in theology from the Philosophisch-Theologische Hochschule Vallendar in 2000. He went on to earn a doctorate in Mariology from the University of Dayton.

He served as a professor in pastoral theology in Londrina and at the Paul VI Institute from 2002 to 2004 and then at the Pontifical Catholic University of Paraná from 2005 to 2009. From 2012 he served at the Salesian University Centre in São Bento.

In 2007 he worked with the secretariate of the CELAM conference in Aparecida. He was appointed as secretary of the newly established Dicastery for Laity, Family and Life under its prefect, Cardinal Kevin Farrell.

On August 18, 2022, the 6th General Chapter of his Institute elected Fr Awi Mello as the new General Superior, with a six years term of office.
