= Priest Barracks of Dachau Concentration Camp =

Concentration camp barracks

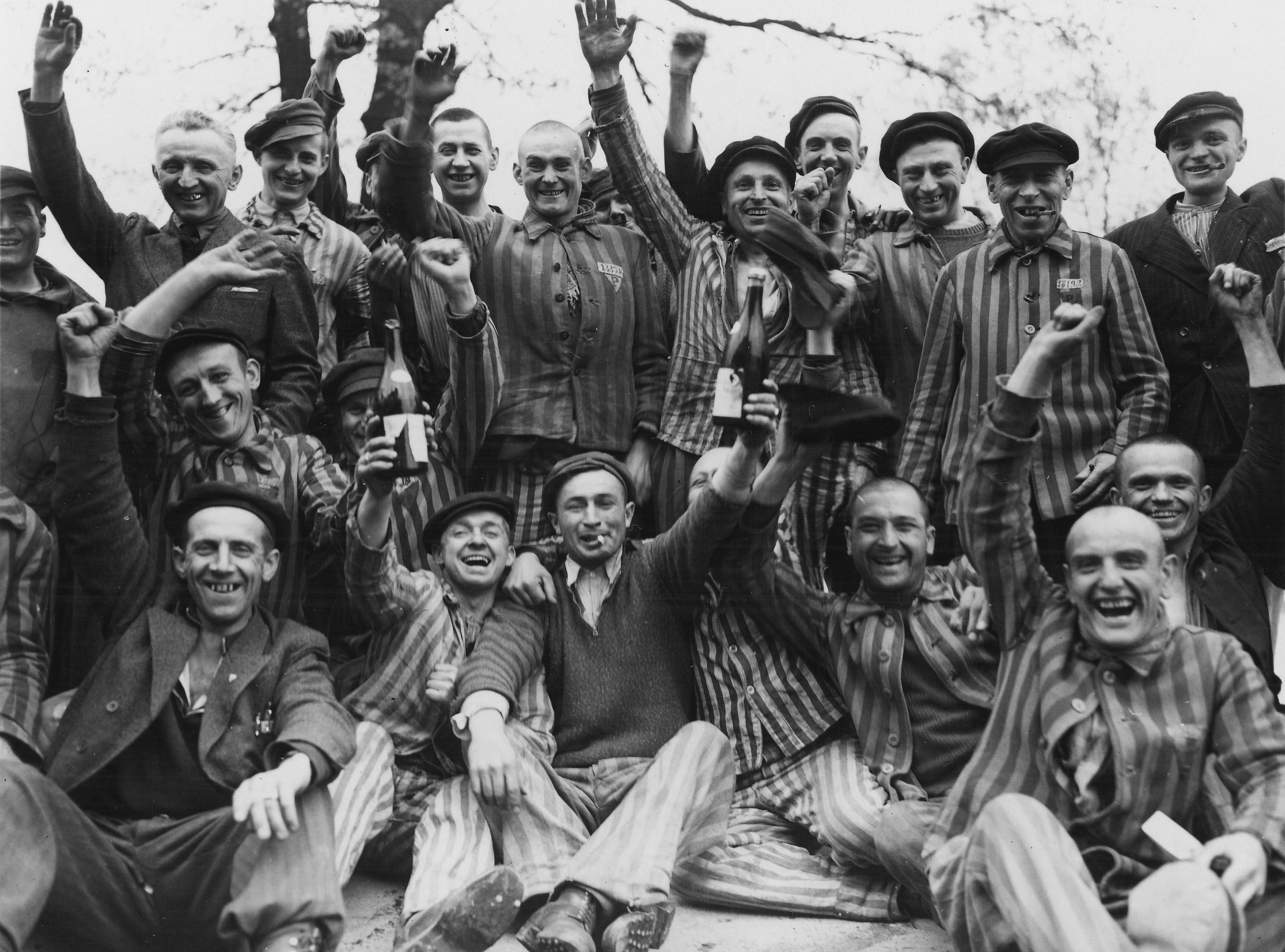
Polish prisoners in Dachau toast their liberation from the camp. Poles constituted the largest ethnic group in the camp and the largest proportion of those imprisoned in the Priest Barracks of Dachau.

The Priest Barracks of Dachau Concentration (in German Pfarrerblock, or Priesterblock) incarcerated clergy who had opposed the Nazi regime of Adolf Hitler. From December 1940, Berlin ordered the transfer of clerical prisoners held at other camps, and Dachau became the centre for imprisonment of clergymen. Of a total of 2,720 clerics recorded as imprisoned at Dachau some 2,579 (or 94.88%) were Roman Catholics. Among the other denominations, there were 109 Protestants, 22 Orthodox, 8 Old Catholics and Mariavites and 2 Muslims. Members of the Catholic Society of Jesus were the largest group among the incarcerated clergy at Dachau.

== Background ==
=== Dachau Concentration Camp ===
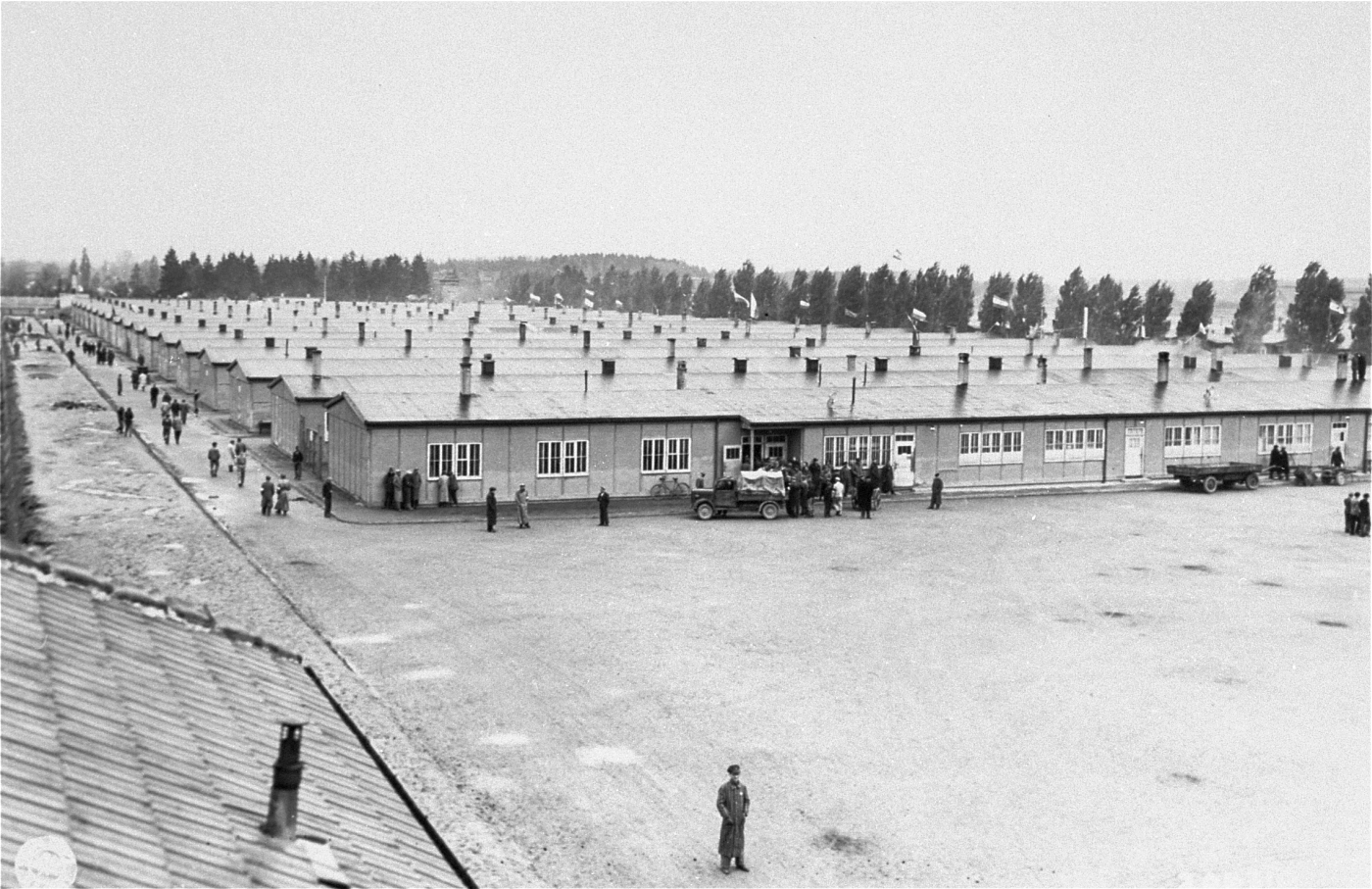
Prisoner's Barracks of Dachau Concentration Camp.

Dachau was established in March 1933 as the first Nazi Concentration Camp. Dachau was chiefly a political camp, rather than an extermination camp, but of around 160,000 prisoners sent to its main camp, over 32,000 were either executed or died of disease, malnutrition or brutalization. The prisoners of Dachau were used as guinea pigs in Nazi medical experiments. The sick were sent to Hartheim to be murdered, (framed as "euthanasia" in the T4 Program).

Along with priests, other political prisoners including Social Democrats and Communists, Jews, Gypsies, Jehovah's Witnesses and homosexuals were also incarcerated at Dachau.

=== The Church Struggle ===
Prior to the Reichstag vote for the Enabling Act under which Hitler gained the "temporary" dictatorial powers with which he went on to permanently dismantle the Weimar Republic, Hitler promised the Reichstag on 23 March 1933, that he would not interfere with the rights of the churches. However, with power secured in Germany, Hitler quickly broke this promise. He divided the Lutheran Church (Germany's main Protestant denomination) and instigated a brutal persecution of the Jehovah's Witnesses. He dishonoured a Concordat signed with the Vatican and permitted a persecution of the Catholic Church in Germany. The long term plan was to "de-Christianise Germany after the final victory". The Nazis co-opted the term Gleichschaltung to mean conformity and subservience to the National Socialist German Workers' Party line: "there was to be no law but Hitler, and ultimately no god but Hitler". Within a short period, the Nazi government's conflict with the churches had become a source of great bitterness in Germany.

Hitler himself possessed radical instincts in relation to the continuing conflict with the Catholic and Protestant Churches in Germany. Though he occasionally spoke of wanting to delay the Church struggle and was prepared to restrain his anti-clericalism out of political considerations, his "own inflammatory comments gave his immediate underlings all the license they needed to turn up the heat in the 'Church Struggle, confident that they were 'working towards the Fuhrer'". A threatening, though initially mainly sporadic persecution of the Catholic Church in Germany followed the Nazi takeover. The regime agreed the Reichskonkordat Treaty with the Vatican, which prohibited clergy from participating in politics. The Concordat, wrote William Shirer, "was hardly put to paper before it was being broken by the Nazi Government". On 25 July, the Nazis promulgated their sterilization law, an offensive policy in the eyes of the Catholic Church. Five days later, moves began to dissolve the Catholic Youth League. Clergy, nuns and lay leaders began to be targeted, leading to thousands of arrests over the ensuing years, often on trumped up charges of currency smuggling or "immorality". In the face of this persecution, Pope Pius XI issued his Mit brennender Sorge Encyclical, which denounced the pagan ideology of Nazism. In response, hundreds more clergy were arrested and sent to the concentration camps.

Ian Kershaw wrote that the subjugation of the Protestant churches proved more difficult than Hitler had envisaged. With 28 separate regional churches, his bid to create a unified Reich Church through Gleichschaltung ultimately failed, and Hitler became disinterested in supporting the so-called "German Christians" Nazi aligned movement. Hitler installed his friend Ludwig Muller, a Nazi and former naval chaplain, to serve as Reich Bishop, but Muller's heretical views against St Paul and the Semitic origins of Christ and the Bible quickly alienated sections of the Protestant church. Pastor Martin Niemöller responded with the Pastors Emergency League which re-affirmed the Bible. The movement grew into the Confessing Church, from which some clergymen opposed the Nazi regime. The Confessing Church was banned on 1 July 1937. Niemöller was arrested by the Gestapo, and sent to the Concentration Camps. He remained mainly at Dachau until the fall of the regime. Theological universities were closed, and other pastors and theologians arrested. Dietrich Bonhoeffer, another leading spokesman for the Confessing Church, was from the outset a critic of the Hitler regime's racism and became active in the German Resistance – calling for Christians to speak out against Nazi atrocities. Arrested in 1943, he was implicated in the 1944 July Plot to assassinate Hitler and ultimately executed.

=== Targeting of clergy ===
In an effort to counter the strength and influence of spiritual resistance, Nazi records reveal that the security services monitored the activities of the bishops very closely – instructing that agents be set up in every diocese, that the bishops' reports to the Vatican should be obtained and that the bishops' areas of activity must be found out. Deans were to be targeted as the "eyes and ears of the bishops" and a "vast network" established to monitor the activities of ordinary clergy: "The importance of this enemy is such that inspectors of security police and of the security service will make this group of people and the questions discussed by them their special concern".

In Dachau: The Official History 1933–1945, Paul Berben wrote that clergy were watched closely, and frequently denounced, arrested and sent to concentration camps: "One priest was imprisoned in Dachau for having stated that there were good folk in England too; another suffered the same fate for warning a girl who wanted to marry an S.S. man after abjuring the Catholic faith; yet another because he conducted a service for a deceased communist". Other were arrested simply on the basis of being "suspected of activities hostile to the State" or that there was reason to "suppose that his dealings might harm society".

== Clergy at Dachau ==
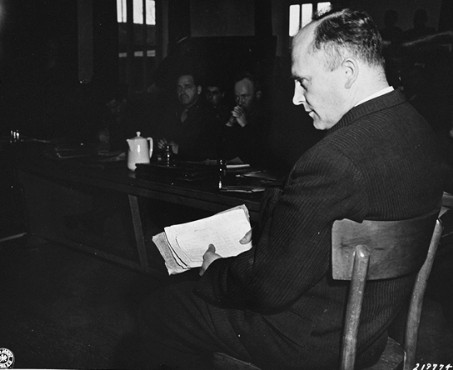
Friedrich Hoffman, a Czech priest, testifies at the trial of former camp personnel and prisoners from Dachau. In his hand he holds a packet of records that show that 324 priests died at the camp after being exposed to malaria during Nazi medical experiments.

Many clergy were imprisoned at Dachau. The first churchman arrived at Dachau in 1935, but from 1940, Dachau became the concentration point for clerical prisoners of the Nazi regime. Prior to this, in the early stages of the camp, the SS had permitted a local priest to celebrate Mass on Sundays in the camp, but invented discouragements for prisoners to attend: following the first Catholic Mass in July 1933, those who attended were lined in ranks and forced to spit at, then lick at the face of the others lined up, before being beaten. The attendant priest was also humiliated and spied upon, but was permitted to hear confessions – in the presence of an SS guard. Ultimately, the SS scheduled extra work for Mass attendees and told the priest that none but two wished to attend Mass, at which point the priest ceased to visit.

On 11 December 1935, Wilhelm Braun, a Catholic theologian from Munich, became the first churchman imprisoned at Dachau. The annexation of Austria saw an increase in clerical inmates. Berben wrote: "The commandant at the time, Loritz, persecuted them with ferocious hatred, and unfortunately he found some prisoners to help the guards in their sinister work". Until 1940, clerical prisoners were initially placed in the punishment blocks 15 and 17 upon arrival, where they would remain for a time before being distributed among the other blocks. From December 1940, Berlin ordered that all clergy distributed among the Nazi network of concentration camps were to be transferred to Dachau, whereafter the camp became the gathering place for thousands of clergy of all ranks. Clergymen were transferred from Buchenwald, Gusen, Mauthausen and Sachsenhausen – though some remained, classed under other categories like "Communist" by the Nazi authorities.

The racial hierarchy of Nazi ideology saw German priests given certain concessions and better treatment than others. With the dire state of Germany's war effort in 1944, German priests were invited to join the armed forces. A few volunteered for the medical corps, most declined and the authorities gave up.

=== Religious activities ===
Despite SS hostility to religious observance, the Vatican and German bishops successfully lobbied the regime to concentrate clergy at one camp and obtained permission to build a chapel, for the priests to live communally and for time to be allotted to them for religious and intellectual activity. Priests were withdrawn from the punishment blocks and gathered in Blocks 26, 28 – and 30, though only temporarily. Block 26 became the international block and 28 was reserved for Poles – the most numerous group.

A chapel was constructed in Block 26 and the first Mass held on 20 January 1941. Two tables were put together to form an altar, and the priests made do with a single vestment and the scant accessories brought by a Polish chaplain from Sachsenhausen. The building improved in October 1941, but the altar and accessories were kept for its symbolic value. By 1944, tabernacle, candelabra, statues and stations of the cross were all present and a range of items scrounged, secretly made or gathered through food parcels. Prisoners of all trades contributed to the construction and upkeep. The tabernacle was originally decorated with metal from food tins, but from 1944 by carved pear wood, behind which stood a crucifix sent by a Münster congregation. A statue of Mary had also been donated at Easter 1943, and placed on a special altar, and dubbed "Our Lady of Dachau". Berben wrote:

The patient work by clergy and lay people alike had in the end achieved a miracle. The chapel was 20 metres long and 9 wide and could hold about 800 people, but often more than a thousand crowded in. The walls were painted with light green crosses alternating with lilies. Special care was taken over the decoration of the east end behind the altar. The windows... had been made to look like stained glass... but in September 1941, when German clergy were separated from the others, the windows looking out on Block 28 were covered in a thick coat of white paint.

— Extract from Dachau: The Official History 1933–1945 by Paul Berben

Lay prisoners were forbidden from the chapel – and barbed wire erected in an effort to keep the clerics separate from other prisoners. Friction and jealousies developed among the "ordinary prisoners". The SS continued to harass the chapel-going priests – snatching the eucharist, trampling rosaries and medallions. In March 1941, conditions improved again, with easing of work requirements, allowance for meditation, permission to read newspapers and use the library, and the allocation of Russian and Polish prisoners to tend to the priests' quarters. Briefly wine and cocoa were supplied. "It appears that this was due to the intervention of the Vatican", wrote Berben – though the camp guards continued to humiliate the priests.

Religious activity outside the chapel was totally forbidden. Laymen were forbidden to enter the building, and, wrote Berben, the German clergy feared that breaking this rule would lose them their chapel: "the clergy in Block 26 observed this rule in a heartless way which naturally raised a storm of protest. With the Poles in Block 28 it was different: all Christians of whatever nationality were welcomed as brothers and invited to attend the clandestine Sunday Masses, celebrated before dawn in conditions reminiscent of the catacombs". Priests would secretly take confessions and distribute the Eucharist among other prisoners.

From March 1943, all priests could officiate at Mass, and in 1944, Masses were held each Sunday, celebrated by all nationalities and the chapel was also used by other denominations. While Catholics could communicate in Latin, the multinational nature of the prison population made communication difficult.

In December 1944, Karl Leisner, a deacon from Münster who was dying of tuberculosis received his ordination at Dachau. Gabriel Piguet, Bishop of Clermont-Ferrand had arrived at the camp in September and was able to organise for the necessary documents. The necessary objects of worship were secretly scrounged, a bishop's cross, mitre, cassock and cape were improvised and Piquet presided at the secret ceremony, enabling Leisner to celebrate his first Mass. The new priest died soon after the liberation of the camp.

=== Treatment of Polish clergy ===
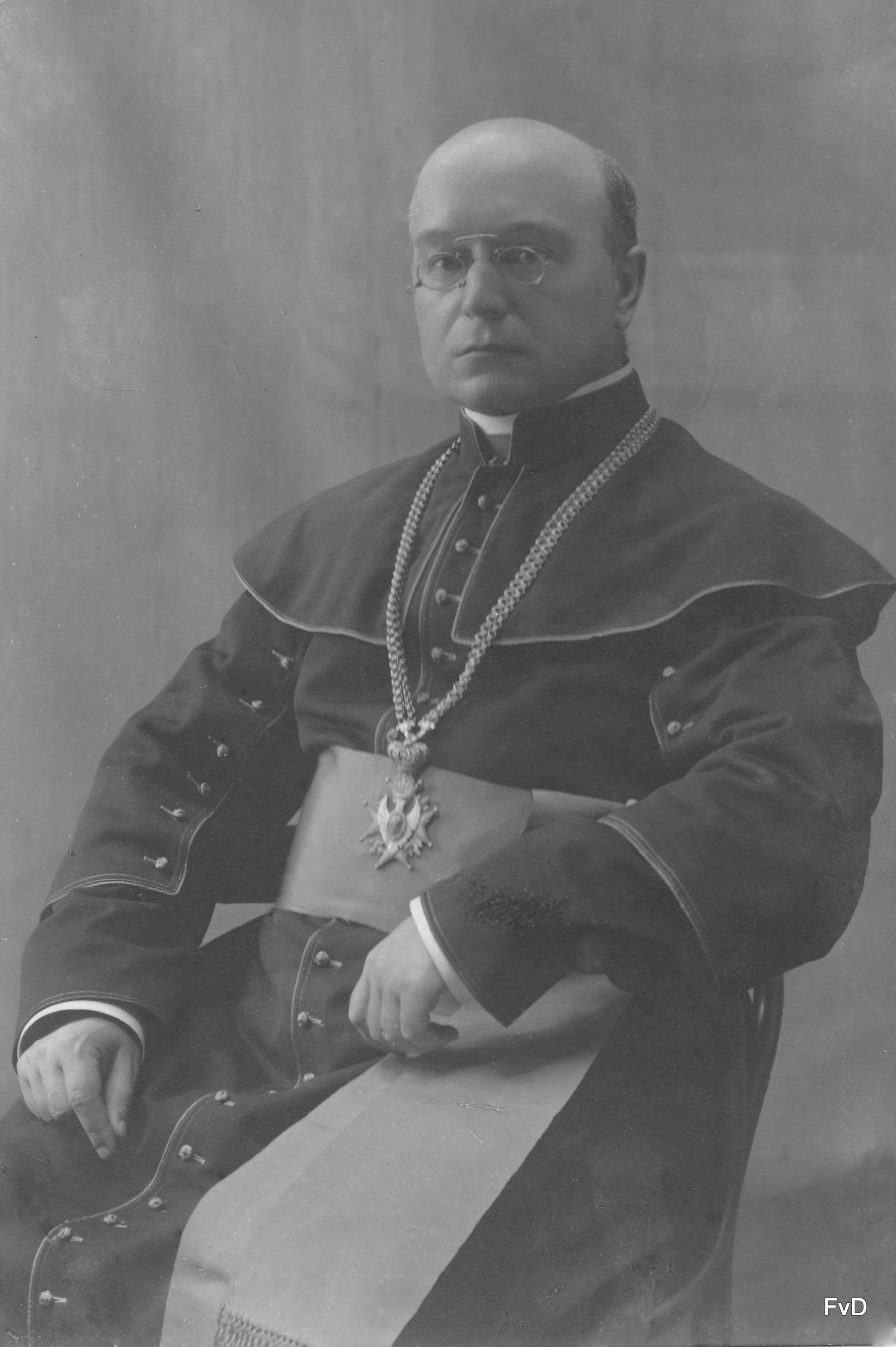
Antoni Zawistowski was tortured and died at Dachau in 1942. 1780 Polish clergy were sent to Dachau, and many are remembered among the 108 Polish Martyrs of World War II.

The Nazis introduced a racial hierarchy – keeping Poles in harsh conditions, while favouring German priests. 697 Poles arrived in December 1941, and a further 500 of mainly elderly clergy were brought in October the following year. Inadequately clothed for the bitter cold, of this group only 82 survived. A large number of Polish priests were chosen for Nazi medical experiments. In November 1942, 20 were given phlegmons. 120 were used by Dr Schilling for malaria experiments between July 1942 and May 1944. Several Poles met their deaths with the "invalid trains" sent out from the camp, others were liquidated in the camp and given bogus death certificates. Some died of cruel punishment for misdemeanors – beaten to death or run to exhaustion.

Polish priests were not permitted religious activity. Anti-religious prisoners were planted in the Polish block to watch that the rule was not broken, but some found ways to circumvent the prohibition: clandestinely celebrating the Mass on their work details. By 1944, conditions had been relaxed and Poles could hold a weekly service. Eventually, they were allowed to attend the chapel, with Germany's hopes of victory in the war fading.

=== Conditions in the camp ===
1942 was a painful year for the inmates of Dachau. Exhausted by forced labour and facing malnutrition, inmates were forced to sweep heavy snow. Hundreds died in Blocks 26, 28 and 30. Clergy – even the younger Germans – were set to work in plantage, cloth repair and some in office work. The arrival of a new commandant improved conditions from August of that year. Food parcels were permitted for clergy – and these came from family, parishioners and church groups, enabling secret distribution to other prisoners, but the relative comfort afforded to the priests angered ordinary prisoners. Some priests distributed their food – others hoarded it. The food parcels ceased in 1944, as Germany's communications decayed in the final stages of the war, though German priests continued to receive extra food tickets.

The clergy were excluded from administrative posts in the camp until 1943 – unsympathetic prisoners were awarded the posts prior to this. From 1943, clergy could work as nurses and provide spiritual aid to the sick – some consequently falling victim to infectious diseases.

According to Ronald Rychlak the clergy prisoners were treated marginally better than other prisoners, however treatment worsened in the wake of Papal or episcopal announcements critical of the Nazi regime, such as Pope Pius XII's 1942 Christmas address. One Easter, the guards marked Good Friday by torturing 60 priests. Tying their hands behind their backs, chaining their wrists, and hoisting them up by chains – tearing joints apart and killing and disabling several of the priests. The threat of further torture was used to keep the priests obedient. Food was so lacking, that prisoners would retrieve scraps from the compost pile.

An Austrian priest, Andreas Reiser of Dorgastein, was imprisoned for putting up a notice at his church which denounced the Nazi system. Sent to Dachau in August 1938, he later wrote of his experience, saying that the prisoners were stripped to the waist, shaven headed and forced to labour through the day. A young SS guard was assigned to torment him and at one point forced Reiser to wrap barbed wire on his head as a "crown of thorns" and carry planks (like Christ "carried the cross"), while Jewish prisoners were forced to spit on him. Dachau was re-opened in 1940, whereupon German priest Fritz Seitz became the first clerical inmate – he was mocked on arrival and told that the Pope would be imprisoned at Dachau at war's end.

In a book about his time at Dachau, Father Jean Bernard of Luxembourg wrote that although forbidden to celebrate Mass, priests were brought great comfort through conducting secret Masses, using scraps of bread as communion.

=== Statistics ===
Of a total of 2,720 clergy recorded as imprisoned at Dachau, the overwhelming majority, some 2,579 (or 94.88%) were Catholic. Among the other denominations, there were 109 Lutherans (known in German as Evangelicals), 22 Orthodox, 8 Old Catholics and Mariavites and 2 Muslims. In his Dachau: The Official History 1933–1945, Paul Berben noted that R. Schnabel's 1966 investigation, Die Frommen in der Holle found an alternative total of 2,771 and included the fate all the clergy listed, with 692 noted as deceased and 336 sent out on "invalid trainloads" and therefore presumed dead.

Kershaw noted that some 400 German priests were sent to Dachau. Total numbers are difficult to assert, for some clergy were not recognised as such by the camp authorities, and some – particularly Poles – did not wish to be identified as such, fearing they would be mistreated.

Members of the Catholic Society of Jesus (Jesuits) were the largest group among the incarcerated clergy at Dachau.

The Clergy Barracks of Dachau : Clergy by nationality
Nationality	Total number	Released	Transferred elsewhere	Liberated 29/4/45	Deceased
Poland	1780	78	4	830	868
Germany	447	208	100	45	94
France	156	5	4	137	10
Czechoslovakia	109	1	10	74	24
Netherlands	63	10	0	36	17
Yugoslavia	50	2	6	38	4
Belgium	46	1	3	33	9
Italy	28	0	1	26	1
Luxembourg	16	2	0	8	6
Denmark	5	5	0	0	0
Lithuania	3	0	0	3	0
Hungary	3	0	0	3	0
Stateless	3	0	1	2	0
Switzerland	2	1	0	0	1
Greece	2	0	0	2	0
Britain	2	0	1	1	0
Albania	2	0	2	0	0
Norway	1	1	0	0	0
Romania	1	0	0	1	0
Spain	1	0	0	1	0
Total	2720	314	132	1240	1034

== High profile prisoners ==
A small number of clergymen at Dachau were held in private cells in the bunker. These included high profile inmates Dr. Johannes Neuhäusler, a Catholic auxiliary Bishop from Munich and the Protestant pastor Reverend Martin Niemöller. In 1940, "the German bishops and the Pope had persuaded Reichsführer-SS Heinrich Himmler to concentrate all the priests imprisoned in the various concentration camps into one camp, and to house them all together in separate blocks with a chapel where they could celebrate Mass. In early December 1940, the priests already in Dachau were put into Barracks Block 26 near the end of the camp street. Within two weeks, they were joined by around 800 to 900 priests from Buchenwald, Mauthausen, Sachsenhausen, Auschwitz and other camps, who were put into Blocks 28 and 30. Block 30 was later converted into an infirmary barrack".

== Commemoration ==
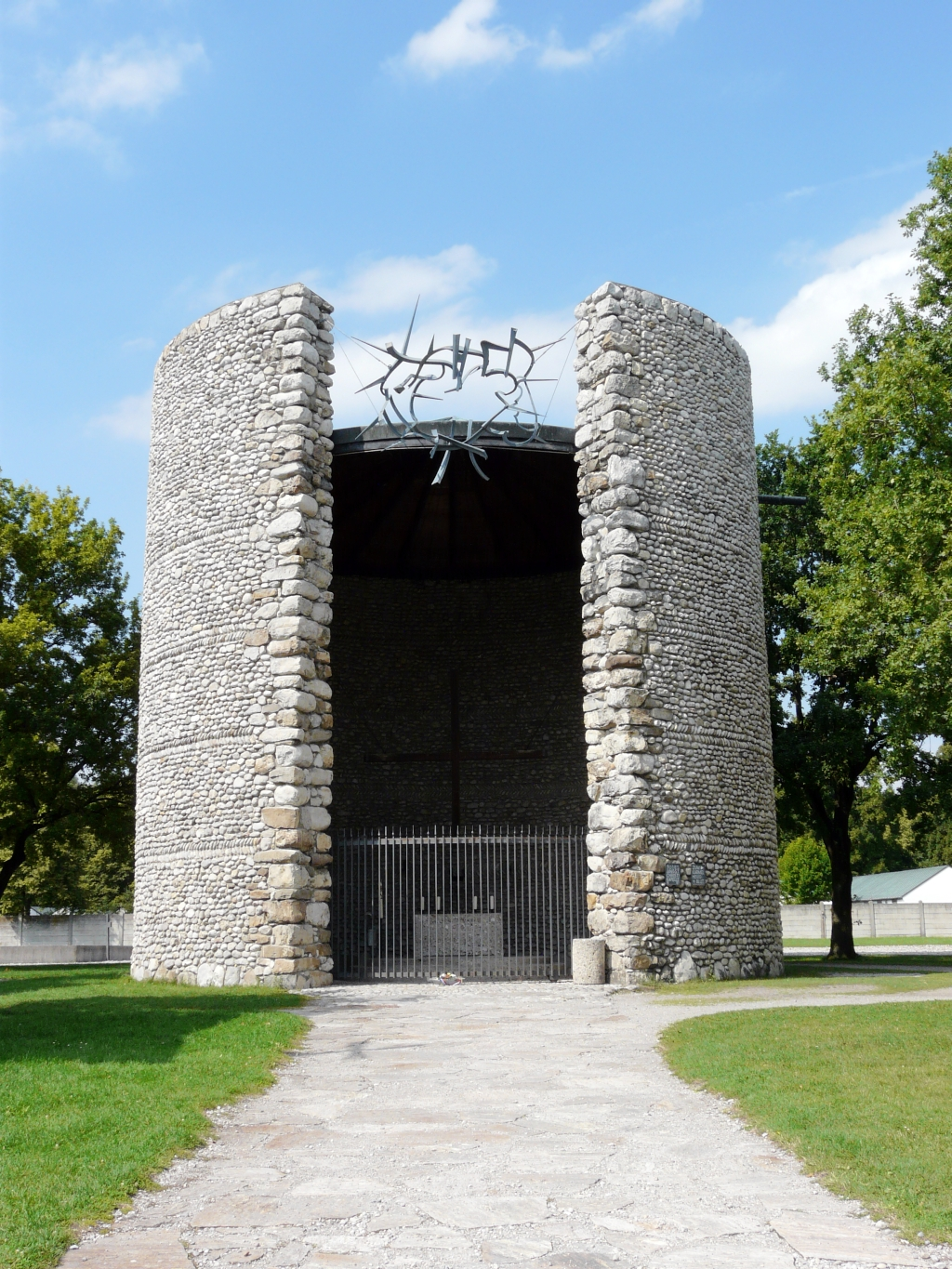
Catholic Mortal Agony of Christ Chapel.

=== Catholic ===
The Mortal Agony of Christ Chapel was constructed at Dachau in 1960, as the first religious monument at the site, at the instigation of former prisoners, including Johannes Neuhäusler (later auxiliary bishop of Munich). A plaque at the back of the chapel recalls the suffering of Polish prisoners of Dachau and was erected by Polish priest survivors. Austrian survivors donated the memorial bell, inscribed: "In faithful memory of our dead comrades of all nations, dedicated by Dachau priests and laymen from Austria."

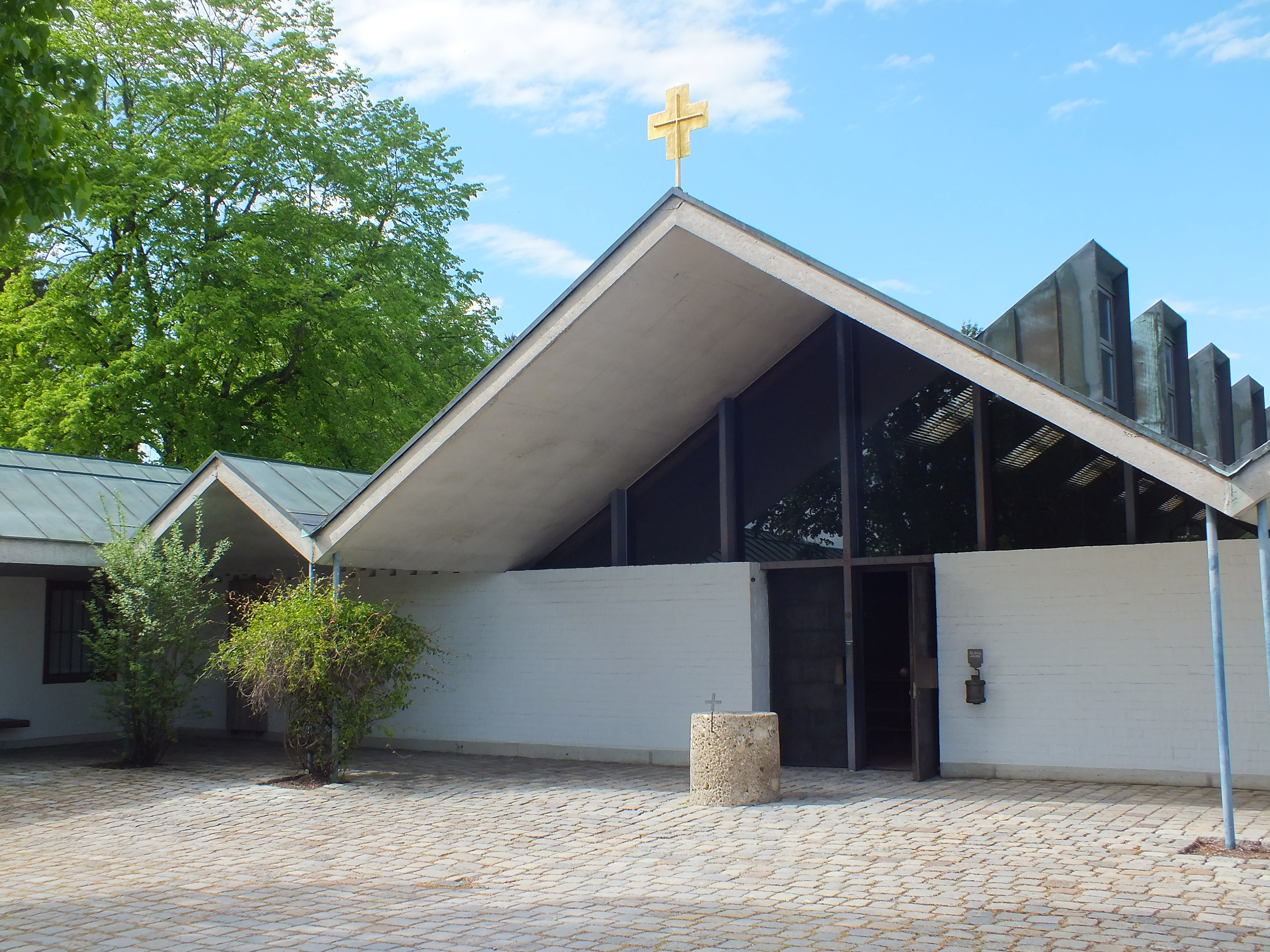
Carmel of the Precious Blood. The atrium is entered through the former Guard Tower.

A Discalced Carmelite Convent is situated by the North Guard Tower at Dachau, the Carmel of the Precious Blood, where the nuns offer prayers for atonement. The convent houses the "Madonna of Dachau", a statue of Mary from the Priests' Barracks. Former prisoners are also buried at the convent. The monastery also houses relics the priest-martyrs, such as handmade vessels from sheet the priests used for secretly celebrated Masses.

==== Saints of Dachau ====
Among the priest-martyrs who died at Dachau were many of the 108 Polish Martyrs of World War II. Blessed Gerhard Hirschfelder died of hunger and illness in 1942. Saint Titus Brandsma, a Dutch Carmelite, died of a lethal injection in 1942. Blessed Alojs Andritzki, a German priest, was given a lethal injection in 1943. Blessed Engelmar Unzeitig, a Czech priest died of typhoid in 1945. Blessed Giuseppe Girotti died at the camp in April 1945.

Amid the Nazi persecution of the Tirolian Catholics, Blessed Otto Neururer, a parish priest was sent to Dachau for "slander to the detriment of German marriage", after he advised a girl against marrying the friend of a senior Nazi. He was cruelly executed at Buchenwald in 1940 for conducting a baptism there. He was the first priest killed in the concentration camps.

The Blessed Bernhard Lichtenberg died en route to Dachau in 1943. In December 1944, Blessed Karl Leisner, a deacon from Munster who was dying of tuberculosis received his ordination at Dachau. His fellow prisoner Gabriel Piguet, the Bishop of Clermont-Ferrand presided at the secret ceremony. Leisner died soon after the liberation of the camp.

=== Protestant ===
The Protestant Church of Reconciliation opened in 1967. The distinctive architecture was designed by Helmut Strifler. A steel gate within the chapel by Fritz Kuhn is inscribed with words from the 17th psalm: "Hide me under the shadow of thy wings".

=== Russian Orthodox ===
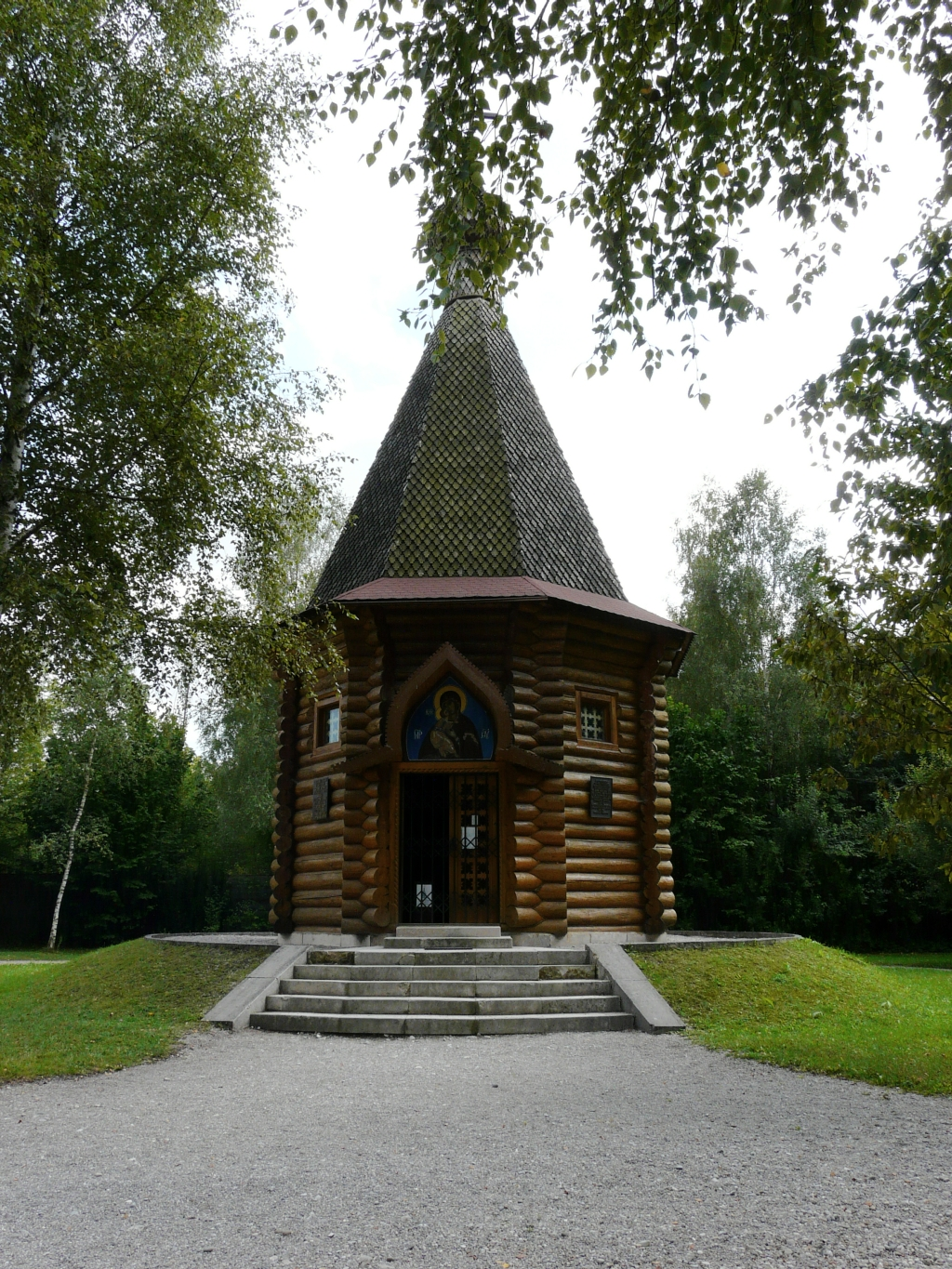
Russian-Orthodox Resurrection of our Lord Chapel.

The Russian-Orthodox Resurrection of our Lord Chapel opened in 1995 and was built by a group of the Russian armed forces. Icons depict the resurrected Christ leading camp prisoners out of their barracks through a gate held open by angels; Jesus’ final prayer in the Garden of Gethsemane; and Pilate presenting Christ to the people with the words "Ecce homo."

=== Film ===
- The Ninth Day; Germany 2004 by Volker Schlöndorff.

== Notable clergy held at Dachau ==
- Blessed Engelmar Unzeitig (1911–1945) He was a professed member of the Mariannhill Missionaries. The Gestapo arrested Unzeitig on 21 April 1941 for defending Jews in his sermons and sent him to the Dachau concentration camp without a trial on 8 June 1941. In the autumn of 1944 he volunteered to help in catering to victims of typhoid but he soon contracted the disease himself. Unzeitig died of the disease on 2 March 1945 and was cremated. He became known as the "Angel of Dachau".
- Serbian Patriarch Gavrilo V of the Serbian Orthodox Church, imprisoned in Dachau from September to December 1944
- a number of the Polish 108 Martyrs of World War II:
- Father Jean Bernard (1907–1994), Roman Catholic priest from Luxembourg who was imprisoned from May 1941 to August 1942. He wrote the book Pfarrerblock 25487 about his experiences in Dachau
- Titus Brandsma, Dutch Carmelite father and priest and professor of philosophy, died 26 July 1942
- Norbert Čapek (1870–1942) founder of the Unitarian Church in the Czech Republic
- Josef Beran (1888–1969) after the Second World War a Cardinal and the Prague archbishop, house arrested by the Communist regime and forcibly expelled from the country.
- Štěpán Trochta (1905–1974) after the war a Czech bishop imprisoned for many years by the Communist regime and a Cardinal in pectore.
- Blessed Stefan Wincenty Frelichowski, Polish Roman Catholic priest, died 23 February 1945
- August Froehlich, German Roman Catholic priest, he protected the rights of the German Catholics and the maltreatment of Polish forced labourers
- Blessed Hilary Paweł Januszewski, Polish Carmelite friar of the Ancient Observance and Roman Catholic priest
- Ignacy Jeż, Polish Roman Catholic Bishop
- Joseph Kentenich, founder of the Schoenstatt Movement, spent three and a half years in Dachau
- Bishop Jan Maria Michał Kowalski, the first Minister Generalis (Minister General) of the order of the Mariavites. He perished on 18 May 1942, in a gas chamber in Schloss Hartheim.
- Adam Kozłowiecki, Polish Roman Catholic Jesuit Cardinal, missionary in Africa
- Max Lackmann, Lutheran pastor and founder of League for Evangelical-Catholic Reunion
- Blessed Karl Leisner, in Dachau since 14 December 1941, freed 4 May 1945, but died on 12 August from tuberculosis contracted in the camp
- Josef Lenzel, German Roman Catholic priest, he helped of the Polish forced labourers
- Bernhard Lichtenberg – German Roman Catholic priest, was sent to Dachau but died on his way there in 1943
- Henryk Malak, Polish Roman Catholic priest in Dachau from 14 December 1941 until liberation in April 1945. He wrote the book Shavelings in Death Camps, published after his death, about his six years of imprisonment in the camps of Stutthof, Grenzdorf, Sachsenhausen and Dachau.
- Martin Niemöller, imprisoned in 1941, freed 4 May 1945
- Saint Nikolaj Velimirović, bishop of the Serbian Orthodox Church and an influential theological writer, venerated in the Eastern Orthodox Church.
- Lawrence Wnuk, Polish Roman Catholic priest
- Nanne Zwiep, Pastor of the Dutch Reformed Church in Enschede, spoke out from the pulpit against Nazis and their treatment of Dutch Citizens and anti-Semitism, arrested 20 April 1942, died in Dachau of exhaustion and malnutrition 24 November 1942
- Augustin Schubert, Czech Roman Catholic priest, Augustinian friar, and leader in the Orel movement.
- Franz Boehm, Roman Catholic parish priest who repeatedly preached from the pulpit against Nazi ideology. Died 13 February 1945.

== See also ==
- International Day of Prayer for the Persecuted Church
- Nazi persecution of the Catholic Church in Poland
- Catholic Church and Nazi Germany
- Persecution of Jehovah's Witnesses in Nazi Germany
- German Resistance to Nazism
- Rescue of Jews by Catholics during the Holocaust
- Jesuits and Nazism

== Bibliography ==
- Berben, Paul (1975). Dachau, 1933–1945: the official history. Norfolk Press. ISBN 978-0-85211-009-6.
- Bernard, Jean (2007). Priestblock 25487: A Memoir of Dachau. Translated by Deborah Lucas Schneider. Ignatius Press. ISBN 978-0-9725981-7-0.
- Blainey, Geoffrey (2011). A Short History of Christianity. Penguin Books. ISBN 978-0-85796-255-3.
- Bullock, Alan (1991). Hitler: A Study in Tyranny. HarperCollins. ISBN 978-0-06-092020-3.
- Gill, Anton (1994). An Honourable Defeat: A History of German Resistance to Hitler, 1933–1945. London: Henry Holt and Company. ISBN 978-0-8050-3514-8.
- Kershaw, Ian (2008). Hitler: A Biography. W. W. Norton & Company. ISBN 978-0-393-06757-6.
- Kershaw, Ian (2000). The Nazi Dictatorship: Problems and Perspectives of Interpretation. Bloomsbury USA. ISBN 978-0-340-76028-4.
- Korszyński, Franciszek (1957). Jasne promienie w Dachau [Bright Beams in Dachau] (in Polish). Pallottinum.
- Neuhäusler, Johann (1999). What was it Like in the Concentration Camp at Dachau?: An Attempt to Come Closer to the Truth.
- Shirer, William L. (1990). The Rise and Fall of the Third Reich. Simon & Schuster. ISBN 978-0-671-72868-7.
