= John Pozzobon =

Brazilian deacon (1904–1985)

Venerable João Pozzobon
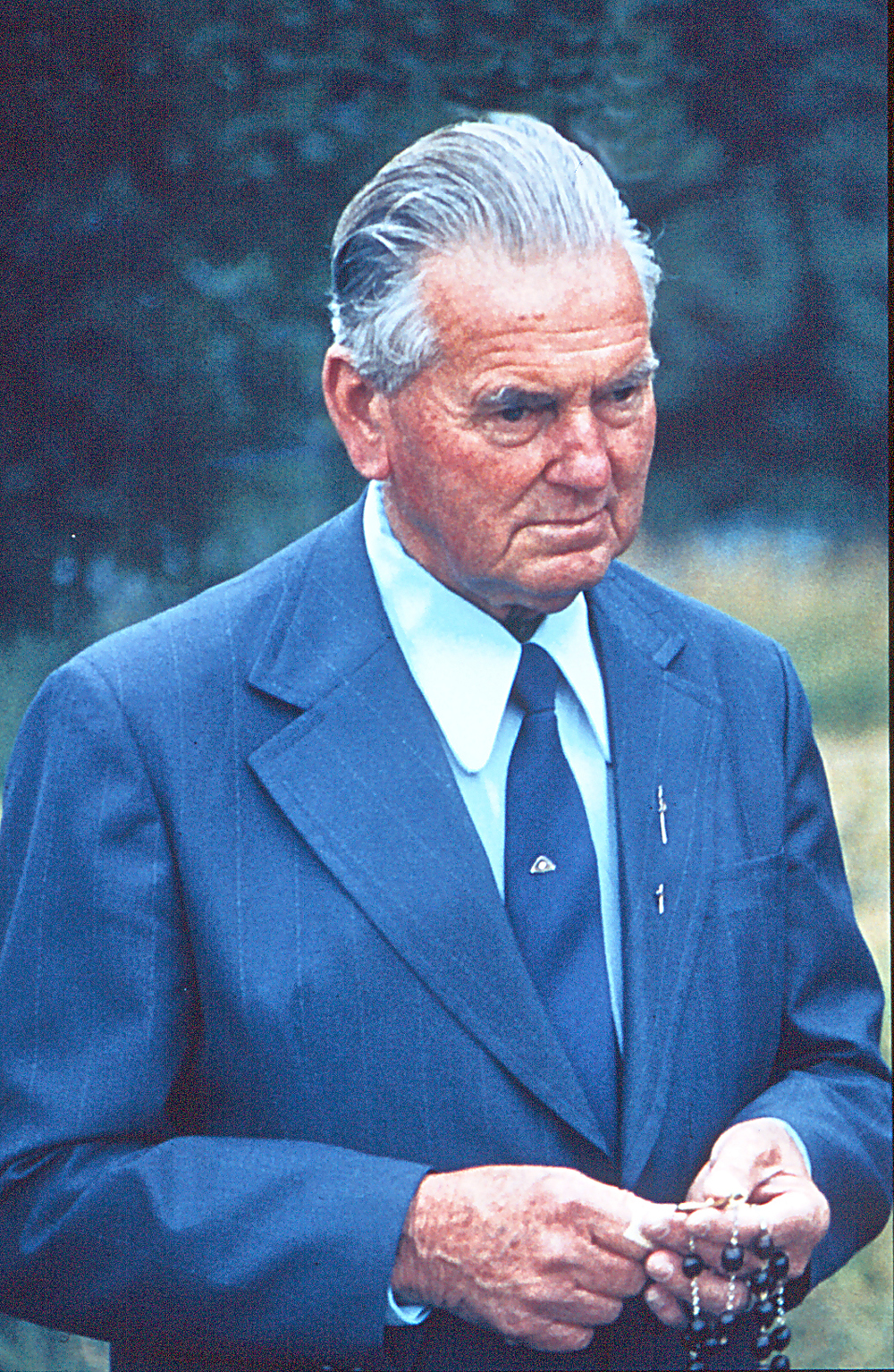
- Born: 12 December 1904; São João do Polêsine
- Hometown: Santa Maria (Brazil)
- Died: 27 June 1985 (aged 80); Santa Maria (Brazil)
- Major works: Starter of the Schoenstatt Pilgrim Mother (Rosary) Campaign

João Pozzobon (12 December 1904 – 27 June 1985) was a Catholic permanent deacon and the starter of the Schoenstatt's Pilgrim Mother Campaign (also known as the Rosary Campaign), today present in more than 100 countries in the world. His beatification process was opened in 1994.

== Life ==
=== Childhood ===
A son of Italian immigrants established in Southern Brazil, João was born in São João do Polêsine to simple and pious peasant family, that prayed the Rosary every evening. The third of nine brothers, when he was 10 years old he says to his father that he would like to become a Catholic priest. For that reason, he goes to study in the Pallotines seminary in Vale Vêneto, not far from his hometown.

After some 10 months there, he decides to return to his home, because of his poor physical health. At 14, he begins to have serious sight problems, so he could not continue his school studies. For the same reason, he was not deemed fit for military service.

Years later, João will say about his health: "God, in his infinite goodness, did not deem me incapable. He employed me as such I am and entrusted me to his Mother for the Campaign of the Holy Rosary. No one is unable to serve God."

=== Husband and father ===
He marries at the age of 23 and has two children, but at 28 his wife dies. He had moved to the city of Santa Maria during the illness of his wife. It is in this city that, at 32 and with two young children, he forms a new household by marrying Victoria Filipetto, with whom he has five other children. He quits his occupation of peasant to open a small shop in the front part of his house. He becomes very respected by the people of his town, especially thanks to his honesty. He said: "I could be a rich man, but I applied only the legitimate profit margin; you can't get what belongs to others." This practice was very different from that of other traders at the time, who sold goods by twice the price they were purchased.

=== The first contacts with Schoenstatt ===
It is in 1947 that his life crosses the path of the Schoenstatt Movement. He begins his journey of spiritual formation with the Schoenstatt Sisters of Mary and Father Celestino Trevisan. He participates in the blessing of the foundation stone of the Schoenstatt Shrine in Santa Maria. In this ceremony is present Joseph Kentenich, founder of Schoenstatt. This fact will mark him forever: "I felt like a little pupil of Father Kentenich," said Pozzobon later. "Since when I was twelve I felt a void, a lack of something I did not understand. But from that time, I discovered that it was the lack of God and His Mother."

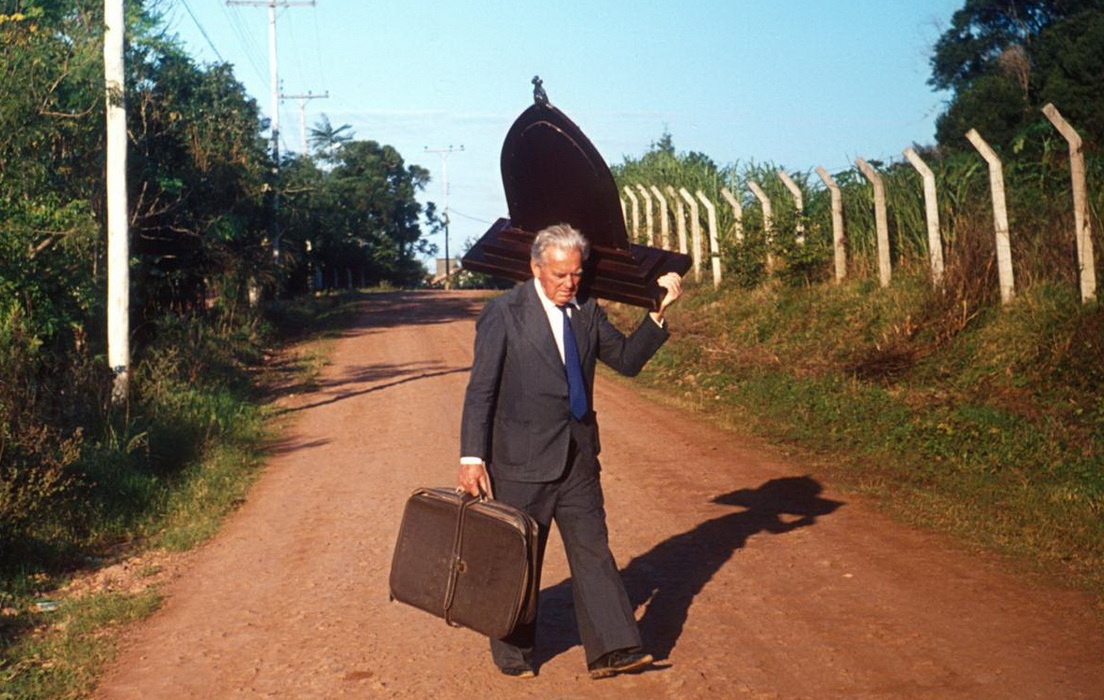
John Pozzobon carrying the Pilgrim Mother picture

John sealed his Covenant of Love with Mary on 11 April 1948, the day of the blessing and inauguration of the Shrine in Santa Maria.

=== The beginnings of the Pilgrim Mother Campaign ===
In 1950, Pope Pius XII had called a Holy Year for the Church. On 1 November of that year would see the proclamation of the dogma of the Assumption of the Blessed Virgin Mary.

In September, John had attended, with a hundred men, a series of spiritual exercises that Father Celestino Trevisan had given with Teresinha Gobbo. They discussed the importance of praying the rosary and how to stimulate a prayer crusade in the families. On 10 September 1950, a replica of the Mater ter admirabilis, present in the Schoenstatt Shrine, was blessed and entrusted to John Pozzobon for that he went to pray the Rosary with the image in families.

"In that moment, I understood that the goodness and mercy of God and the Mother and Queen had given me a great evangelizing mission: the Holy Rosary Campaign." He is convinced that "when something comes from God, one man can move the world. I said to Mary: 'I have seven children and a wife, and I am accountable to God for my children and my wife. But if it is the will of God and Yours, one man can move mountains.' But all went well. In the early years, I had dedicated to the Mother and Queen two hours a day of my time. When the children were already older and could work in the shop, I passed to dedicate myself fully to the Campaign. If God wants that someone performs a task, He also concedes the time to dedicate to his family."

Requests to receive the visit of the Mother Thrice Admirable picture were increasing. John remained in his store in the morning and, after delivering all orders, he left the counter to his wife or children to spend the afternoon by visiting the families to pray the rosary.

He began to visit schools, hospitals and even prisons in the region. And always on foot, carrying the image on his back, weighing over 25 pounds (11 kg).

John also organized missions in the villages: he brought the picture in the villages and families gather to pray the Rosary. Then he preached the Gospel, spoke about conversion and inquires about the material and spiritual status of families. So he left the village and returned a few days later, bringing material aid and also a priest to celebrate Mass, to hear confessions, to marry couples and to baptize children.

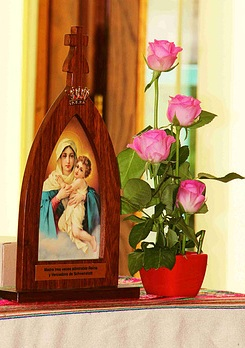
The Pilgrim Mother's smaller image used today

Many families returned to the Church; pilgrimages to the Schoenstatt Shrine were organized; Eucharistic adoration was established in several parishes; farmers build chapels in villages.

=== Development of the Campaign ===
Over time, John could not arrive alone to do more visits with the Pilgrim Image; then the Schoenstatt Sisters of Mary made copies of the pilgrim image, but in a smaller size to make it easier its transportation by other voluntaries, that visit thirty families each with them.

On 30 December 1972, he was ordained Permanent Deacon by Bishop Eric Ferrari. John Pozzobon was therefore put to severe hardship. At first, his work was not understood and often criticized. But he remained in obedience to his bishop and his parish priest]

"Sometimes, forlorn, I asked myself: What am I doing? I give up what is most dear to me, away from my family, alone in this way. Then I realized: I bring the Mother of God. The world needs heroism. And that gave me back the strength and courage to go on."

=== Commitment to the poorest ===
Around 1955, Jean founded the "Noble Village of Charity," where he builds free homes for the poor who lived with his family in the streets: "There, I understood the meaning of the Via Crucis, the distress of the Christ that we can only imagine. The suffering of our brothers caused by those who make no effort to sacrifice for the other. I trust in the Divine Providence. I have never been a rich man, but I know God does not forsake those who serve his neighbor. Once, I received a small amount of money that made possible the purchase of a lot of land and the necessary building material. Generous people have contributed, hands were put to work, and in a few time the first houses were built."

After that, Pozzobon and a group of volunteers began to distribute clothes, food and educate the people of the Village of Charity to the work. They also planted fruit trees and flowers. Their objective was to help the poor to conquest dignity and self-respect.

"I wanted so much to change this world so dominated by materialism. Bring Jesus, bring His message, and that all became good and loved each other. I felt a lot of strength and joy, and I put myself at the disposal of the Mother to accept all the sacrifices she sent me. For love to this sacred image, I've had two thousand different beds in the darkness of the night, among the lilies of the fields and the woods. She always accompanied me in the long marches, crossing valleys and rivers, and when I was sitting by the road and said to her, 'Mom, I cannot stand it anymore!' When I passed by humiliations and hardships, she always accompanied me. With only my strength I could never have done all this."

=== Pozzobon's death and the continuation of his work ===
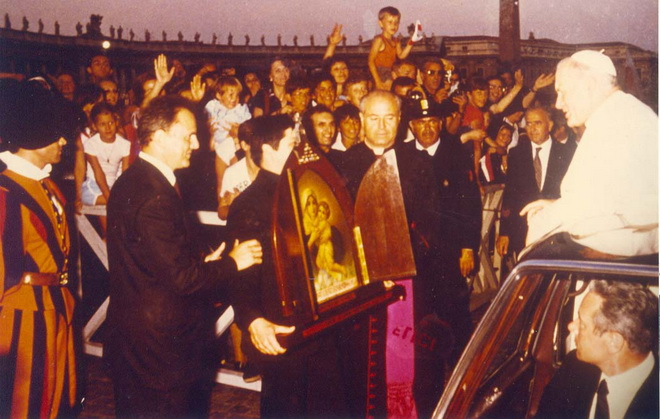
Pope John Paul II blesses the first Pilgrim Mother, in 1984

On 15 June 1985, John offered his life in the Sanctuary for the flourishing of the Rosary Campaign. On the morning of 27 June 1985, Pozzobon was deadly hit by a truck in the middle of a thick fog in Santa Maria, Rio Grande do Sul while on his way to the Shrine of Our Lady of Schoenstatt to attend Mass, as he did every day.

The Pilgrim Mother Campaign, according to the wishes of Pozzobon, continues to flourish. It is now present in over 100 countries worldwide, in the six continents. Even in Antarctica there is a statue of Our Lady of Schoenstatt, in a scientific research station.

Pozzobon traveled more than 87,000 miles (140,000 km) with the image of the Pilgrim Mother of Schoenstatt in his almost 40 years of apostolate.

Recent data from the Campaign secretariat in Brazil indicates that today only in this country there are almost two and a half million families receiving the pilgrim image of the Mother Thrice Admirable, what represents one in every seven Brazilian Catholics.

=== Beatification process ===
His beatification process was opened in 1994 in the diocese of Santa Maria. In May 2009 the diocesan phase has been completed and the case was sent to the Congregation for the Causes of Saints in Rome. The Roman phase of the process began on 3 June 2009, just a week after the arrival of the more than 10,800 documents instructing the cause, which surprised its postulators, who expected a much longer await, between three months and one year for the reception of the case at the Vatican. Since then, John Pozzobon was called a Servant of God. On 20 June 2025 he was declared venerable by Pope Leo XIV.

== Bibliography ==
- Uriburu, Esteban. A Hero Today, Not Tomorrow: The Life of John Louis Pozzobon a Poor Pilgrim and Deacon, 1904–1985. Translated by Naomi Emiliani and Valerie Lewis. [s.l.]: Schoenstatt Publications USA, 1991. 126 p. ISBN 978-0620162579
