= Karl Leisner =

German Roman Catholic priest

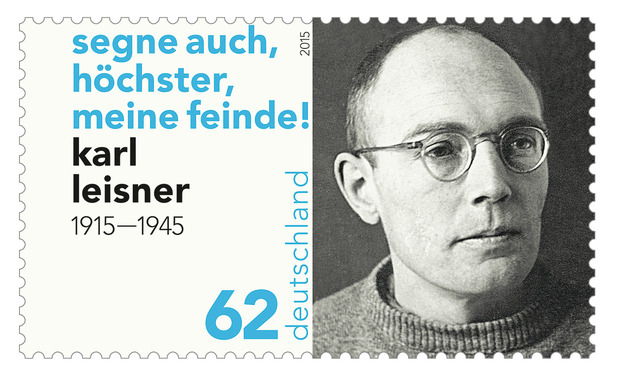
Karl Leisner, German stamp (2015); inscription: Bless also, o Most High, my enemies.

Karl Leisner (28 February 1915 in Rees – 12 August 1945 in Planegg, Germany) was a German Catholic priest interned in the Dachau concentration camp. He died of tuberculosis shortly after being liberated by the Allied forces. He has been declared a martyr and was beatified by Pope John Paul II on 23 June 1996.

== Life ==
Leisner was born on 28 February 1915, the oldest of five children. When he was six years old, the family moved to Kleve, a city on the lower Rhine, where his father worked as a civil servant. He attended school and completed his gymnasium studies in 1934. During his youth, he became an altar boy and, at the suggestion of the high school chaplain, formed a Catholic youth group, the Saint Werner Group. These youth groups combined prayer with outdoor activities, such as camping and cycling. Leisner turned out to be a natural leader and became a youth leader in the 1930s, during the era in which the Nazis were beginning to take control of all youth organizations. In order to avoid Nazi interference, Leisner would often take his group on camping trips to Holland or Belgium.

In 1934, when he was nineteen, Leisner entered the seminary in Munich, and was named Diocesan Youth Leader by Clemens August von Galen, Bishop of Münster. He spent six months in compulsory agricultural work during which, despite Nazi opposition, he organized Sunday Mass for his fellow workers. In 1937, his parents' house was raided by the Gestapo, who seized his diaries and papers. These meticulously preserved documents tell how the spiritual young man became a religious leader.

On 25 March 1939, Galen ordained Leisner a deacon. Shortly after his ordination, during a medical examination, the doctor told the new deacon that he had contracted tuberculosis. In those days, the sole treatment available for the disease was good food and fresh air. These were to be found at a sanitorium in St. Blasien, in the Black Forest, where he was sent and began to recover. It was during his recovery that a fellow patient heard him criticize Adolf Hitler. The Gestapo arrested him as a political prisoner on 9 November 1939, when he was twenty-five. He was interned first in Freiburg and later in Mannheim. Leisner was initially imprisoned in the Sachsenhausen concentration camp, but was moved to the Dachau concentration camp on 14 December 1940, where he became prisoner No. 22,356. Since he was a deacon, Leisner was assigned to the priests' block.

Prisoners often had to work outside in snow or rain and then had to sleep in their wet prison clothes. Cold weather, poor rations and harsh treatment proved a dangerous combination for someone already suffering tuberculosis. Such conditions caused Leisner's condition to become active. Then, during an inspection, two Gestapo guards beat him unconscious and he spent several hours on the floor of his hut. By March 1942, he was spitting blood and was forced to report to the infirmary where medical experiments were known to be performed. He was put in a room that was crowded with over 100 tuberculosis patients. In Dachau, there was never any attempt to cure a disease and very little care was given to the sick. During inspections of the infirmary, any patient thought to be incurable was executed. Only the help of fellow prisoners prevented Leisner from being included in the "invalids' transport" to the Hartheim extermination clinic.

On 17 December 1944, Gaudete Sunday, a fellow prisoner, French Bishop Gabriel Piguet, secretly ordained him a priest. The necessary paperwork with the authorization for the ordination, as well as other necessary items, were smuggled into the camp by "Mädi", the "Angel of Dachau", a young woman named Josefa Mack. (Mack went on to become a School Sister of Notre Dame in Munich, called Sister Maria Imma.) Some imprisoned Protestant pastors helped organize the event and a Jewish violinist played music near the barracks to create a diversion.

The newly ordained priest only celebrated a single Mass and was so ill that he had to postpone his first Mass for over a week. When Dachau was liberated on 4 May 1945, Leisner was taken to a sanatarium in Planegg, near Munich. He died there a few months later, on 12 August 1945.

Leisner's body was taken to Kleve and buried in a local cemetery on 20 August 1945. His remains were exhumed and re-interred in the crypt of the Cathedral of Xanten in 1966.

== Beatification ==
On a visit to Berlin in 1996, Pope John Paul II recognized Leisner as a martyr for the Catholic faith and beatified him, together with Bernhard Lichtenberg, another Nazi resister. His feast day is 12 August.

== Media ==
Some works have been published in English about Leisner. One is The Victory of Father Karl by Otto Pies, published in 1957. It was a translation of Stephanus heute; Karl Leisner, Priester und Opfer. A radio drama adaptation was produced for "The Hour of St. Francis" with the same title. A half-hour docudrama on videotape was released by the Daughters of St. Paul in 1984, also with the same title.

== Leisner and Schoenstatt ==
Karl Leisner got to know the Schoenstatt movement as a teenager and belonged to a Schoenstatt group - which included the future Bishop of Münster, Heinrich Tenhumberg – up till his final days. Throughout his life, the few but intense times of personal encounter with Our Lady in the Original Shrine in Schoenstatt remained the decisive milestones for Karl Leisner on his path of calling. "Christ, my passion" - led by this ideal, he worked in the diocesan youth and wrestled his way to a decision for a celibate life as a priest. In the Dachau concentration camp he founded, together with Josef Fischer, the first Schoenstatt group in Dachau, which had to end its meetings in the 1942 starvation year. From 1943 Karl Leisner belonged to the group "Victor in vinculis Mariae" (victor in the shackles of Mary) and thus to the circle of Schoenstaetters around the founder Josef Kentenich. From the ideal and the fraternity of this group, Karl Leisner drew the strength to accept his fate, which was burdened by the tuberculosis of the lung as well as the difficult conditions in the concentration camp, as the will of God and to offer his life as a martyr.

== See also ==
- Priest Barracks of Dachau Concentration Camp

== Sources ==
- Hermann GEBERT, Geschichte einer Berufung. Karl Leisner (1915-1945). Vallendar, Patris Verlag, 2001.
- Arnaud Join-Lambert, Karl Leisner. Bruyères-le-Chatel : Nouvelle Cité, 2009 (collection Prier 15 jours avec, n° 132) 128 p. ISBN 978-2-85313-582-5; Idem, Ganz und ungeteilt. 15 Tage mit Karl Leisner. Übersetzung von Josef Barmettler – Jutta Krugmann – Oskar Bühler, Vorwort Robert Zollitsch, Patris Verlag, Vallendar 2010, 176 p. ISBN 978-3-87620-342-3.
- René Lejeune, Comme l'or passé au feu. Carl Leisner 1915-1945. Éditions du Parvis, Hauteville / Suisse, 1989, 285 p.
- Hans-Karl SEEGER, Karl Leisners letztes Tagebuch. In Handschrift, in Druckschrift und kommentiert. "Segne auch, Höchster, meine Feinde !". Dialogverlag, Münster, 2000.
- Pies, Otto, The Victory of Father Karl. New York: Farrar, Straus and Cudahy, 1957. Translation of Stephanus heute; Karl Leisner, Priester und Opfer.
