= Engelmar Unzeitig =

German Roman Catholic priest (1911–1945)

Blessed Engelmar Unzeitig CMM
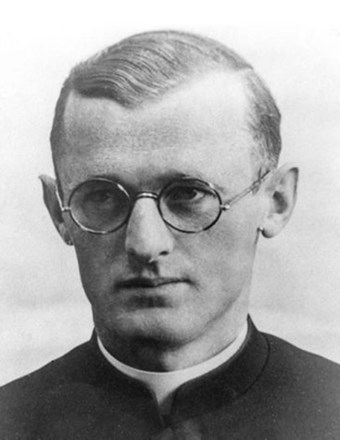

Martyr
- Born: 1 March 1911; Greifendorf, Moravia, Austria-Hungary
- Died: 2 March 1945 (aged 34); Dachau concentration camp, Nazi Germany
- Venerated in: Roman Catholic Church
- Beatified: 24 September 2016, Würzburg, Germany by Cardinal Angelo Amato
- Feast: 2 March

Engelmar Unzeitig (German pronunciation: [ˈɛŋl̩maʁ ˈʔʊntsaɪtɪç]; 1 March 1911 – 2 March 1945), born Hubert Unzeitig, was a German Roman Catholic priest who died in the Dachau Concentration Camp during World War II on the charge of being a priest. He was a professed member of the Missionary Order of Mariannhill and assumed the religious name Engelmar when he was admitted into the order. He became known as the "Angel of Dachau".

In 2016, Pope Francis recognized the fact that Unzeitig died in odium fidei (lit. 'in hatred of the faith') and Unzeitig was subsequently beatified on 24 September 2016 in a ceremony presided over by Cardinal Angelo Amato acting on the pope's behalf.

== Life ==
Hubert Unzeitig was born on 1 March 1911 and had at least one sister.

At the age of 18 he commenced his studies for the priesthood and also entered his novitiate with the Mariannhill Missionaries in Reimlingen; this was in contrast to his earlier intention to become part of the missions. He spent his time as a student of both theological and philosophical studies in Würzburg.

In May 1938 he made his final profession of vows into the order and was received into it with the name of "Engelmar". He was later ordained to the priesthood on 6 August 1939 just a month before the outbreak of World War II and celebrated his first Mass on 15 August 1939 on the Feast of the Assumption; he was soon after assigned as a parish priest in 1940 in Glöckelberg in Austria (today Zadní Zvonková, Horní Planá, Czech Republic).

The Gestapo arrested Unzeitig on 21 April 1941 for defending Jews in his sermons and sent him to the Dachau concentration camp without a trial on 8 June 1941. While there he studied the Russian language in order to tend to the Eastern European prisoners and administered to all prisoners in general in his role as a pastor. In the autumn of 1944 he volunteered to help in catering to victims of typhoid but he soon contracted the disease himself. From prison he wrote to his sister: "Whatever we do, whatever we want, is surely simply the grace that carries us and guides us. God's almighty grace helps us overcome obstacles ... love doubles our strength, makes us inventive, makes us feel content and inwardly free. If people would only realize what God has in store for those who love Him!"

Unzeitig died of the disease on 2 March 1945 and was cremated. His ashes were smuggled in secret to Würzburg and he was hailed as the "Angel of Dachau".

== Beatification ==
The process of beatification was held in Würzburg and was conducted in a usual form since it was conducted in two forms: the case in which miracles would be required and another in which a recognition of "in odium fidei" would be required.

The "nihil obstat" (nothing against) for the cause was granted on 5 September 1988 which allowed for the Congregation for the Causes of Saints to confer upon Unzeitig the title Servant of God. The process for heroic virtue was conducted from 26 July 1991 until June 1996; the process was declared valid on 11 January 2002. The Positio on his life and virtue was submitted to Rome for further investigation in 2005 and allowed for Pope Benedict XVI to proclaim him to be Venerable on 3 July 2009. The next step would have meant the recognition of a miracle for beatification and indeed a process for one such healing was initiated and validated on 2 June 2007; a medical board based in Rome even approved it on 25 March 2010.

However a simultaneous process was conducted from 26 July 1991 to 25 May 2012 to investigate if Unzeitig qualified for a decree of martyrdom and the process was validated on 14 December 2012 with another Positio submitted to the Congregation for the Causes of Saints for additional investigation. Pope Francis approved those findings on 21 January 2016 declaring him to have been a martyr which would allow for his beatification, which was celebrated in Germany on 24 September 2016 with Cardinal Angelo Amato presiding on the pope's behalf.

== See also ==
- Catholic resistance to Nazi Germany
- Priest Barracks of Dachau Concentration Camp
