= Johannes Neuhäusler =

Coat of arms of Johannes Neuhäusler

Bishop Johannes Baptist Neuhäusler (27 January 1888 – 14 December 1973) was a German Catholic bishop and anti-Nazi who was imprisoned at Dachau Concentration Camp.
