= Joseph Kentenich =

German priest, founder of the International Schoenstatt Movement

Servant of God Joseph Kentenich SAC
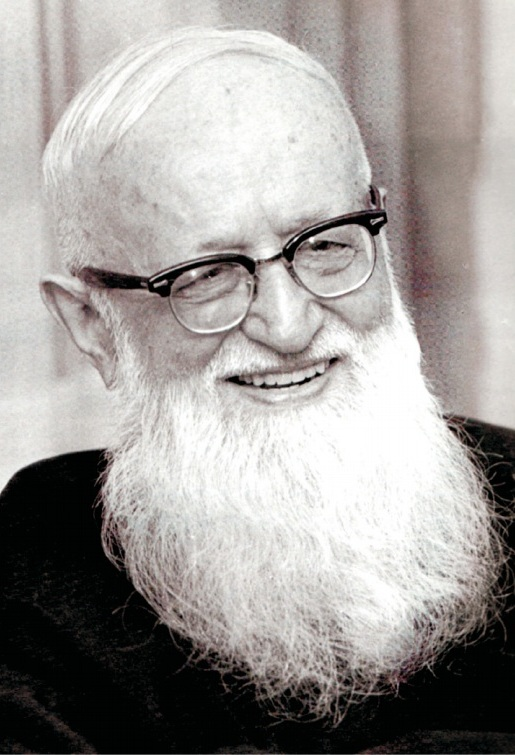

Personal life
- Born: Peter Joseph Kentenich; 16 November 1885 Gymnich, German Empire
- Died: 15 September 1968 (aged 82) Schoenstatt, Vallendar, West Germany
- Resting place: Church of the Adoration, Vallendar, Germany
- Website: http://www.pater-kentenich.org/en/

Religious life
- Religion: Catholicism
- Order: Schoenstatt Movement
- School: Pallottine College
- Profession: Theologian, educator
- Ordination: 8 July 1910

Senior posting
- Present post: Founder and first Director of the Schoenstatt Movement; first Superior General of the Secular Institute of the Schoenstatt Fathers

Military service
- Rank: Priest

Peter Joseph Kentenich, SAC (16 November 1885 – 15 September 1968) was a German Pallottine priest and founder of the Schoenstatt Apostolic Movement. Kentenich was a theologian, educator, and founder of a Catholic movement, whose teachings underwent a series of challenges from political and ecclesiastical powers. The process for his beatification was opened in 1975.

== Early life ==
=== Childhood ===
Kentenich was born on November 16, 1885, in Gymnich, Erftstadt near Cologne, and baptized "Peter Josef Kentenich" on 19 November at the parish church of St.Kuniberts. His father was Matthias Köp, a manager on a farm in Oberbolheim, where his mother Katharina Kentenich was one of the domestic staff. Because his parents never married, Joseph was born at the house of his maternal grandparents, Anna Maria and Matthias Kentenich, where he spent the first years of his life. In 1894 Kentenich was sent to St. Vincent orphanage in Oberhausen.

=== Entrance into the seminary ===
In 1897, Kentenich expressed the wish to become a priest for the first time. Two years later, he entered the Pallottines minor seminary in Ehrenbreitstein. In 1904, he entered the novitiate of the Pallottines in Limburg an der Lahn. However, he faced difficulties because of his intellectualist character. He was obsessed by the philosophical question: "Is there a truth, and how to know it?". He strove for perfection, but felt an incapacity to love God and his neighbor. He later noted that his devotion to Mary allowed him to overcome this crisis and discover the personal love of God.

=== Priesthood ===
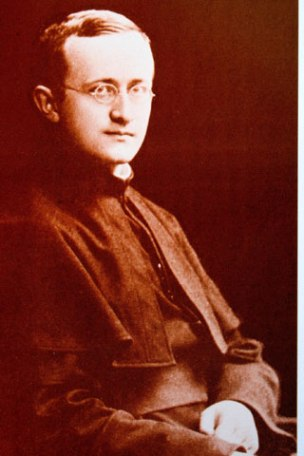
Kentenich as a newly ordained priest, 8 July 1910

Admitted to the religious profession in 1909, Kentenich was ordained as a priest in Limburg an der Lahn on 8 July 1910. Although he wished to become a missionary in Africa with the Pallottines, his poor health prevented him from doing so and he taught at the minor seminary of the Pallottine Fathers in Vallendar-Schoenstatt, near Koblenz.

=== Chaplain ===
During his time at Vallendar-Schoenstatt students began to protest against the internal regulations that they considered too severe; some protesters spread graffiti on the walls. Two priests in charge of their spiritual direction resigned. Kentenich was named as a replacement.

In his first talk, he said to his students: "I am at your disposal with all that I am and all that I have: my knowledge and my ignorance, my competence and my incompetence, but especially my heart... We will learn to educate ourselves under the protection of Mary, to become strong, free and priestly men."

== Founding the Schoenstatt Movement ==
=== Beginning the "Covenant of Love" with Mary ===
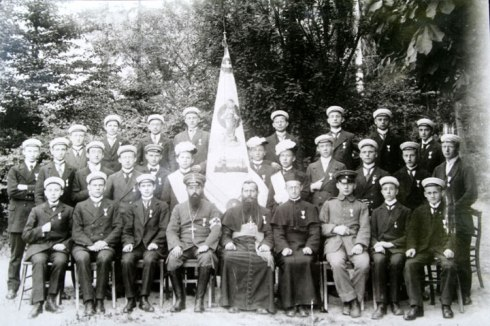
Kentenich with the Schoenstatt Marian Congregation, on 18 October 1914 (seated fourth from the right)

Kentenich interpreted the ideas of his order's founder, Vincent Pallotti, as a call for a worldwide effort to involve lay people in apostolic work, and to unite the various factions in the church.

On 18 October 1914, Kentenich brought together several of his students to found a Marian Congregation. In an old chapel of St. Michael, formerly abandoned and used for the storage of the gardening tools, he gathered about twenty seminarians and they sealed what he called the "Covenant of Love" with the Mother of God. This "Covenant" is conceived not as a symbol, but a bilateral contract between the two contracting parties. The Virgin Mary was requested to establish her throne in the chapel to spread her treasures. Each group member agreed to give their life entirely to the Mother of God, and to let themselves be guided by her through their existence. This was the first milestone of the foundation of the Schoenstatt Movement. The speech Kentenich delivered on this occasion is considered the Schoenstatt Movement's Foundation Act. The organisation was named after its place of origin, a word meaning "Beautiful Place".

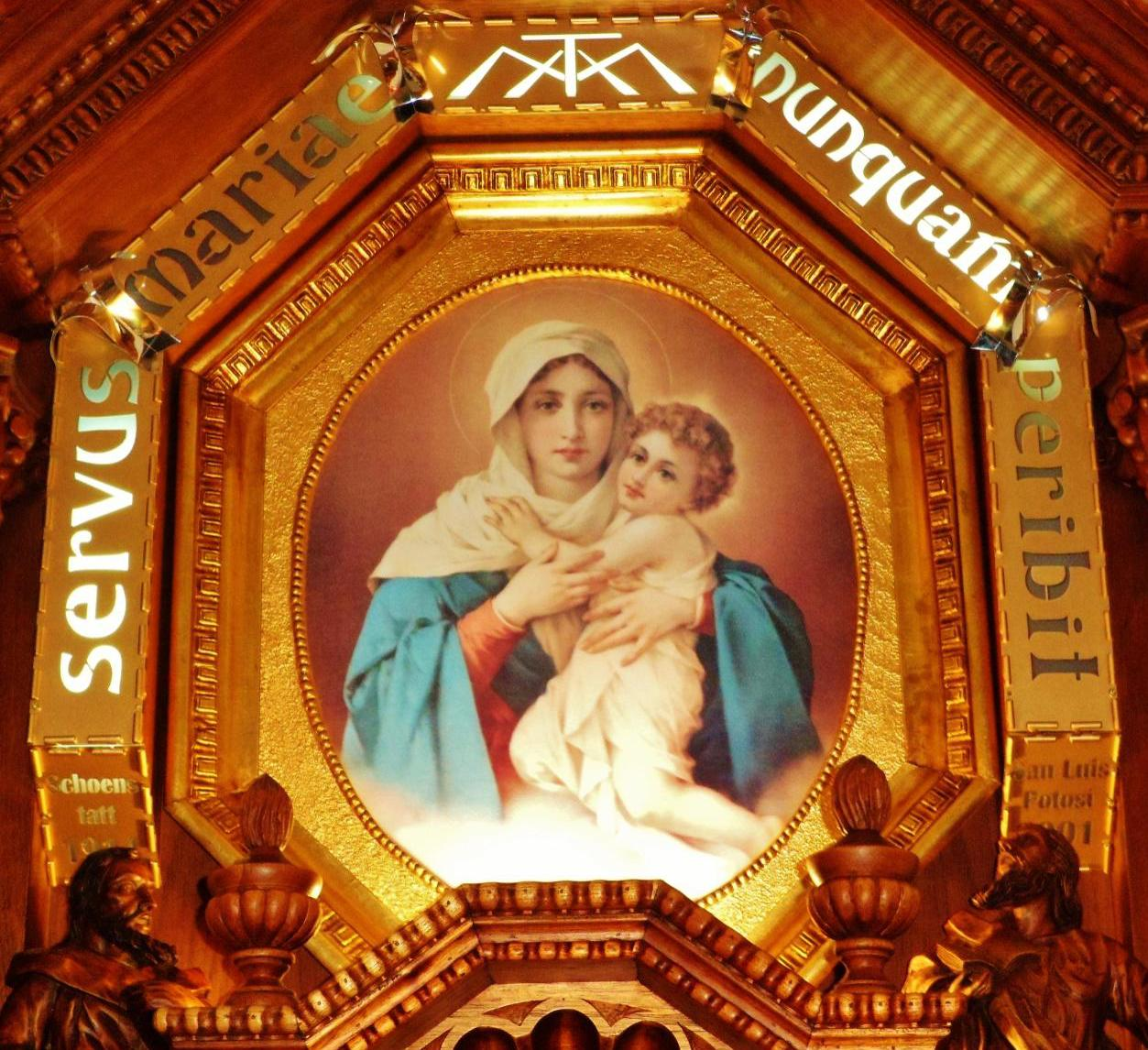
The picture of the Mater Ter Admirabilis

In 1915, a teacher gave Kentenich a picture of the Virgin and Child. The tenderness of Mary's gesture impressed him and he placed the icon above the altar. Venerated under the name Mater ter admirabilis (Mother Thrice Admirable), the picture appears in every Schoenstatt site.

Several of the seminarians died during World War I. The Servant of God Joseph Engling was killed on 4 October 1918 by a shell in Northern France, next to Thun-Saint-Martin. His process of beatification is underway.

=== Between WWI and WWII ===
The movement, initially purely local, expanded rapidly after the World War I. It gradually encompassed many categories; young people, priests, women, sisters, and pilgrims.

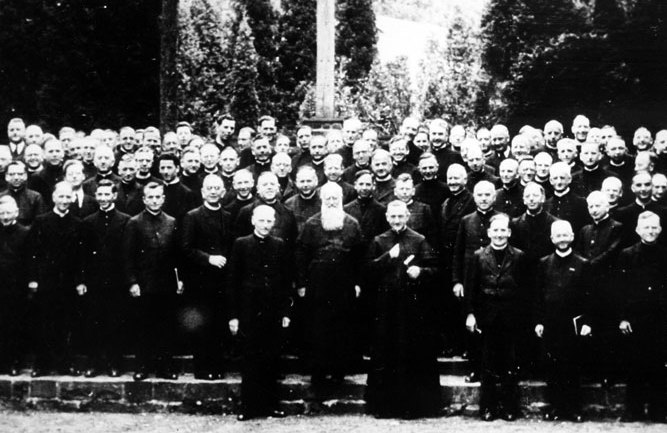
A retreat for priests preached by Fr. Kentenich in Schoenstatt

Father Kentenich traveled through all of Germany, Austria, Czechoslovakia, and Switzerland, to preach retreats and lead training sessions. From 1928 to 1935, he preached every year for more than 2,000 priests, and many other lay retreatants.

In 1926, Kentenich founded the Schoenstatt Sisters of Mary.

== During Hitler's reign ==
Kentenich observed the rise of Nazism with concern, ranking it among the products of what he called "the idealistic and mechanistic thinking" that engulfed Europe since the nineteenth century. In 1933, when the Nazis took power in Germany and closed several religious houses, Kentenich quickly sent groups of the Schoenstatt Sisters of Mary to South Africa, Brazil, Argentina, Chile, and Uruguay to allow the movement to survive in case the persecution of the Church in Germany intensified.

His opposition to Nazism attracted persecutory reactions towards him. Father Kentenich said about the swastika: "We, it is the Cross of the Christ that we follow." About Nazism, he said, "I see no place where the water of baptism could run there".

=== Arrest by the Gestapo ===
Once in power, the Nazis classified Schoenstatt as one of their main opposition groups. On 20 September 1941, Kentenich was summoned by the Gestapo. During the interview, the officers quoted some of his private words which had been reported by an informer: "My mission is to reveal the inner emptiness of National Socialism, and by there to defeat it." The police imprisoned him for a month in what had previously been a Reichsbank vault. He was then transferred to a prison in Koblenz, a former Carmelite convent. He spent 5 months there, after which he was sent on to Dachau concentration camp, where he was held until the end of the war.

=== At Dachau concentration camp ===
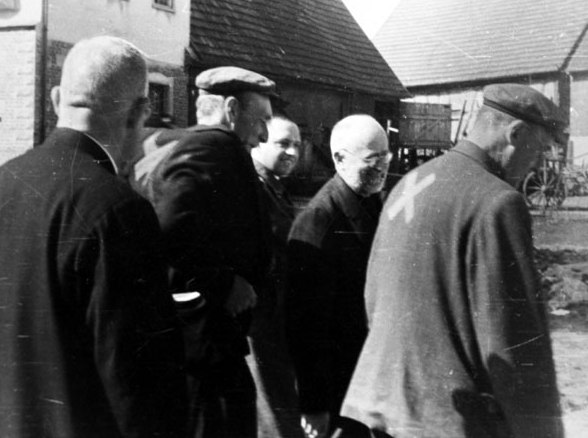
Kentenich at the Dachau concentration camp (second from the right)

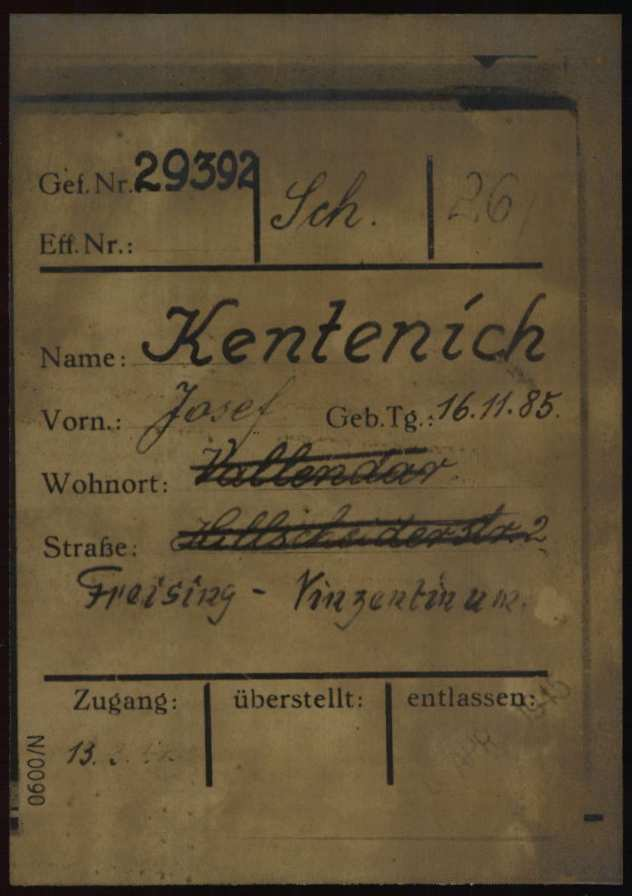
Registration card of Joseph Kentenich as a prisoner at Dachau Concentration Camp

When Kentenich was sent to Dachau in March 1942, there were 12,000 prisoners, including 2,600 priests. He was inmate number 29392. The Germans were grouped in a block where they had the right to attend daily Mass. On 19 March 1943 Kentenich celebrated his first Mass at the camp and later gave nightly talks to his fellow prisoners.

Kentenich came under the protection of the "kapo" (inmate block chief), a communist named Guttmann, after Guttman saw Kentenich sharing his daily bread and soup with another detainee. Guttmann later saved his life; due to poor health, the priest was due to be sent to the gas chamber but Guttmann hid him from the S.S. physician.

=== Foundation of Schoenstatt International at Dachau ===
Kentenich restarted his apostleship each time he was transferred into a new block.On 16 July 1942 two new Schoenstatt branches were created at Dachau under the responsibility of two lay deportees: the Secular Institute of the Families and the Institute of the Brothers of Mary.

During the winter of 1944, epidemics and the tightening of the Nazi regime caused the death of 10,000 prisoners in Dachau. At this point Kentenich formed the International Movement. He wrote treaties on spirituality and prayers, as well as a didactic poem of over 20,000 verses. In December, Bishop Gabriel Piguet, a French prisoner, secretly ordained a seminarian from Schoenstatt (now Blessed Karl Leisner). Suffering from tuberculosis, Leisner would celebrate only one Mass before dying a few weeks after the camp was liberated; he was beatified by John Paul II on 23 June 1996.

On 6 April 1945, upon the arrival of American troops, the prisoners are released. On 20 May, at the feast of Pentecost, Father Kentenich returned to Schoenstatt. He immediately restarted his work, in order to establish a barrier against those whom he considered the biggest dangers to the world: communism in the East, and practical materialism in the West. The experience of deportation helped him teach his disciples on how to maintain inner freedom. Schoenstatt priests Albert Eise (who died of illness while in Dachau) and Franz Reinisch, (who was executed by the Nazis) were invoked as heavenly protectors by all members of the Movement.

== International development of Schoenstatt ==
In March 1947, Kentenich was received in a private audience by Pope Pius XII. He thanked the Pope for the publication, two days earlier, of the constitution Provida Mater Ecclesia, which created the Secular Institutes.

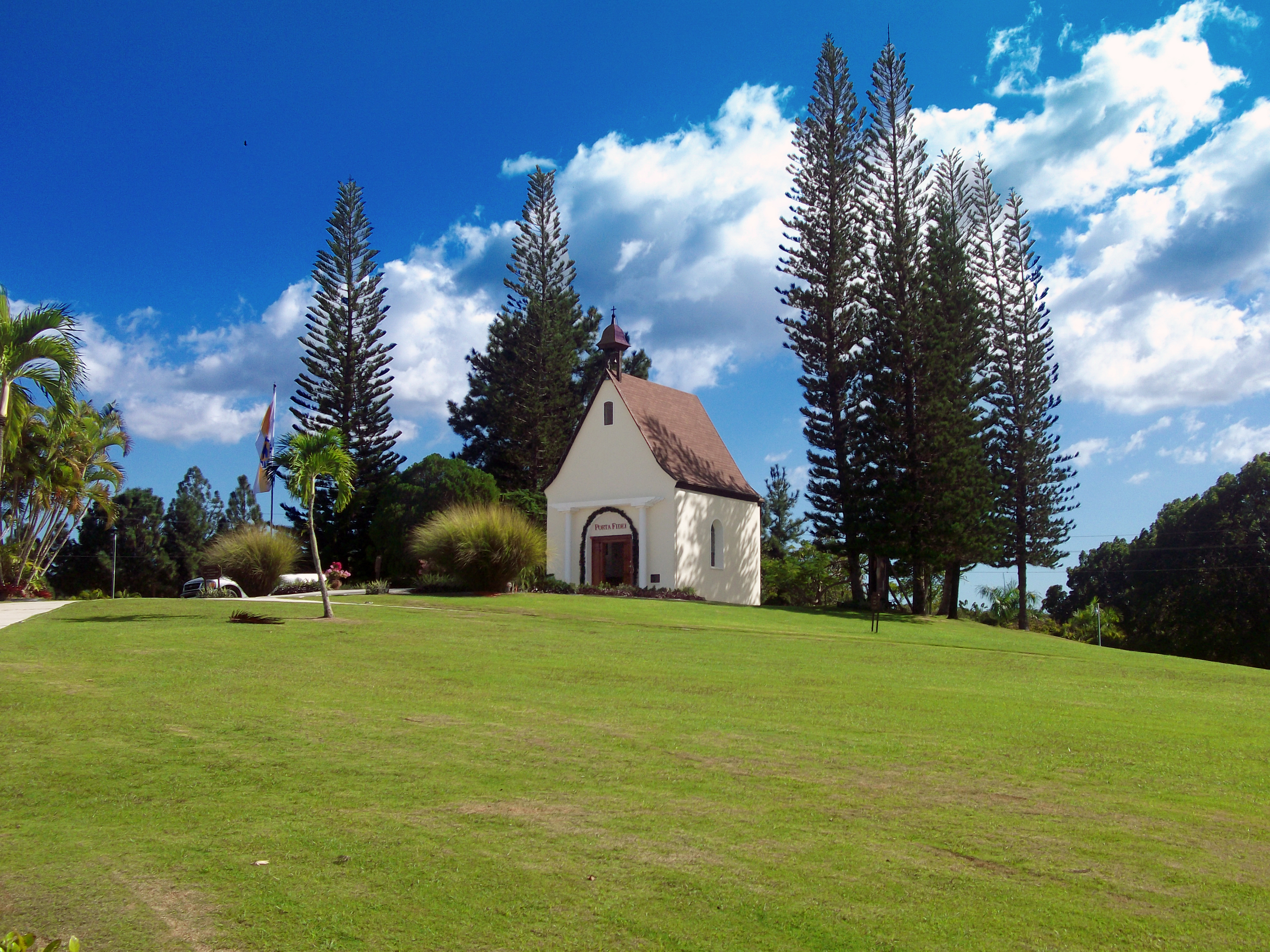
One of the more than 200 Schoenstatt Shrines in the world

In October 1948, the Holy See erected in a Secular Institute the Schoenstatt Sisters of Mary. At the same time, Kentenich traveled to Brazil, Chile, Argentina, Uruguay, the United States, and Africa to establish the movement there, with the construction of replicas of the Schoenstatt Shrine, training centers, and religious houses.

== Exile ==
At this time concerns were raised that the role of the founder was deemed too exclusive. The Bishop of Trier, in whose diocese Schoenstatt is located, ordered a canonical visitation. The visitor, auxiliary Bernhard Stein, praised the movement, but made some criticisms pertaining to the perceived lack of autonomy regarding the sisters.

Kentenich responded by writing a long document on the work of Schoenstatt which was presented as a cure for what he saw as the disease of Western thought, idealism. For Kentenich, Schoenstatt was an antidote to this poison, as it is not an abstract theory but a practical application of Christian doctrine. The Apostolic Visitor, sent the file to the Holy Office in Rome. In 1951, Father Tromp, a Dutch Jesuit, was appointed Apostolic Inspector with extensive powers. Puzzled by the unconventional terminology used by Kentenich, he accused him of being an agitator, an innovator, and a sectarian. After being stripped of all his functions in the movement, Kentenich was assigned a residence in the convent of Pallottines in Milwaukee; all further correspondence with the leaders of the work was prohibited.

His exile lasted fourteen years. He accepted the transfer and wrote: "God does not speak clearly by events? The Church wants to test our obedience, to recognize that if the work and the holder of the work are marked by God." More than three decades later, when witnesses were examined for the cause of Kentenich's beatification, a 78-year-old priest still in office declared, "Kentenich never received any official act of indictment. There was no official lawyer and he was never brought before a judge, much less faced a complainant or a witness."

In 1959, Kentenich was appointed as parish priest of the German-speaking Catholic community of Milwaukee.

In 1953, it was suggested to Pope Pius XII that he dissolve Schoenstatt; he declined. The question was raised if the movement should be integrated into the Congregation of the Pallottines, or retain its autonomy. The superiors of the Order advocated for the first option, but other Pallottines agreed with Father Kentenich that Schoenstatt should be fully autonomous. In 1962, under the intervention of several bishops, John XXIII entrusted the case to the Congregation for Religious.

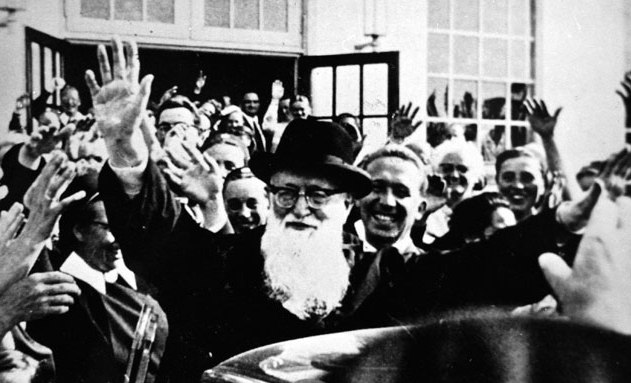
Fr. Kentenich at his arrival in Schoenstatt after the exile

== Return from exile ==
In December 1963, Pope Paul VI appointed Bishop Höffner, from Münster, as moderator and protector of Schoenstatt. A new apostolic visitor was appointed, who delivered a favorable report. In 1964, under the unanimous opinion of the German bishops, a papal decree declared the separation of Schoenstatt from the Pallottines.

In October 1965, Kentenich was reinstated at the direction of the Movement. Now in his eighties, he was received by Paul VI a few days after the closing of the Second Vatican Council. He predicted that the council "will bear fruit, but will have first negative effects, because of the uncertainty of large sections of the hierarchy, clergy and laity about the image of the Church... This uncertainty can be overcome by turning our eyes to Mary, the first image and Mother of the Church.

=== His last actions in Schoenstatt: a father to many ===
On Christmas of 1965, Kentenich was welcomed at Schoenstatt. His work now included five secular institutes: the Schoenstatt Fathers, the Diocesan Priests, the Brothers of Mary, the Sisters of Mary, the Ladies of Schoenstatt, and the Families. This also encompassed the several Federations and Leagues gathering priests, lay people, and families.

Kentenich stressed the fatherhood of God and that of the priesthood in the Church, especially the episcopate. The fatherhood, with the motherly presence of Mary were both essential points of the movement; the practical way to live this was by the covenant of love with the Mother Thrice Admirable.

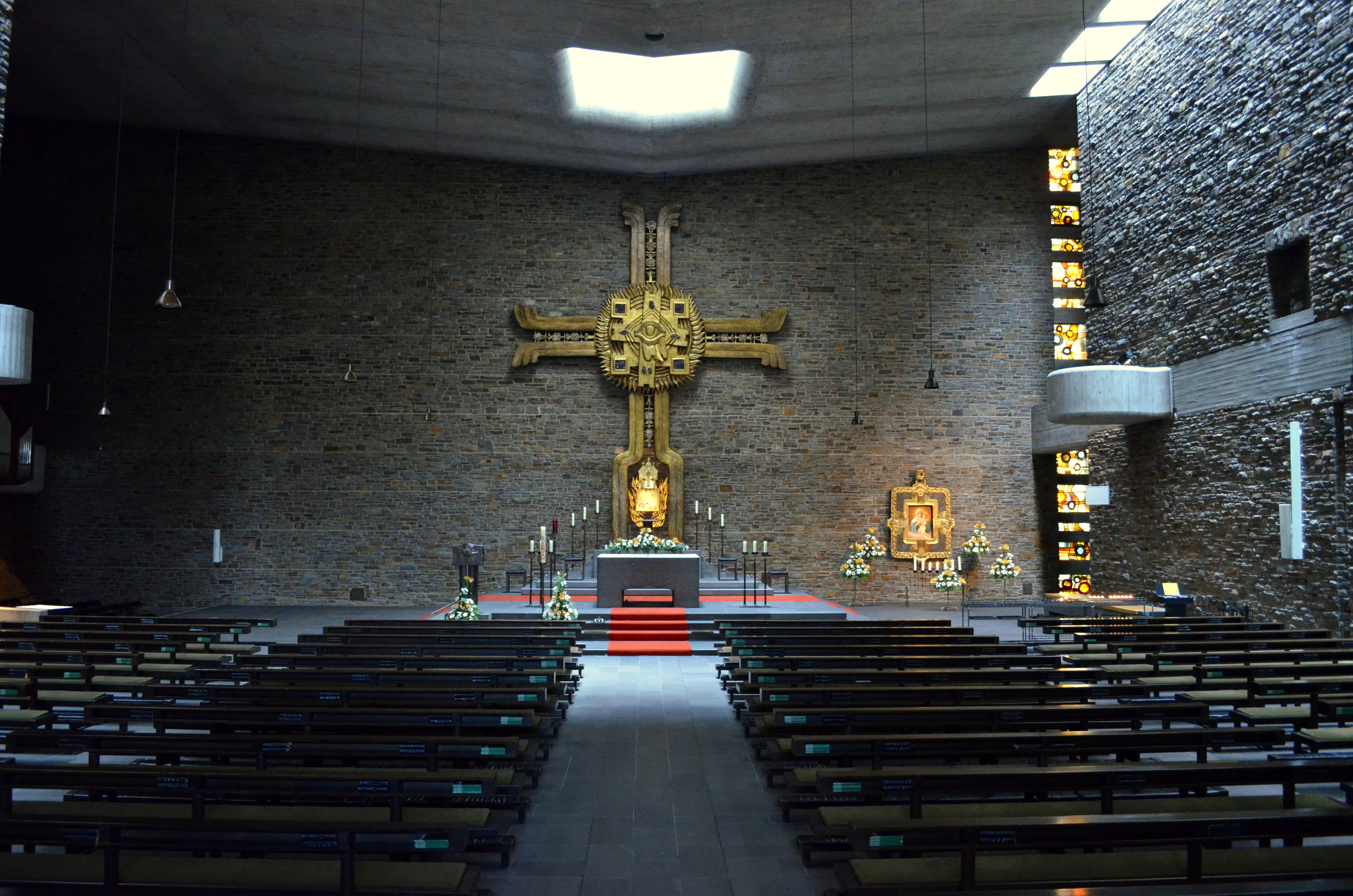
View of the Adoration Church, where Fr. Kentenich is buried

== Death ==
In a speech at the annual conference of German Catholics in 1967, Kentenich said: "We are living in apocalyptic times... Heavenly and devilish powers clash in this earth... This confrontation is to challenge the domination of the world; today this is clearly visible." The solution is to appeal to the Virgin Mary, "favorite weapon in the hands of the living God".

During the last year of his life he often returned to this theme: "The task of Mary is to bring Christ to the world and the world to Christ... We are convinced that the great crises of the present times cannot be overcome without Mary" (12 September 1968).

On 15 September 1968, on the Feast of Our Lady of Sorrows, Kentenich celebrated Mass at the recently inaugurated Church of the Adoration. Six hundred Sisters of Mary attended the ceremony. Just after Mass, he went into the sacristy for the thanksgiving prayer and suffered a heart attack; after receiving the last sacraments he died minutes later.

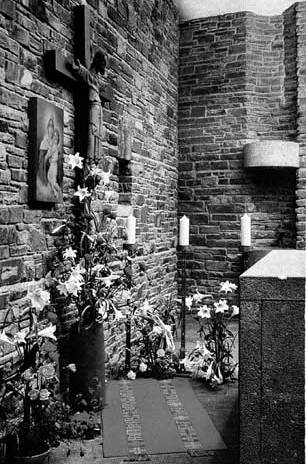
Kentenich's tomb in the Adoration Church's sacristy

He is buried in the Church of the Adoration. On his tomb, according to his wish, is the inscription: Dilexit Ecclesiam ("He loved the Church"; Eph 5:25). This was influenced by the same inscription engraved on the tomb of Cardinal Gaspard Mermillod, Bishop of Geneva (Switzerland) who was exiled from his own country for 11 years in the 19th century, for refusing to adhere to a national church separated from Rome.

== Beatification process ==
The process for his beatification was opened on 10 February 1975 in the Diocese of Trier. Life-size sculptures of Kentenich, created by American artist Gwendolyn Gillen, now stand outside Schoenstatt chapels in Lamar, Texas, Pewaukee, Wisconsin, Rome, Puerto Rico and many other countries.

On 3 May 2022 the Bishop of Trier announced that the process had been suspended because of allegations of abuse.

== Investigations into accusations of sexual abuse ==
In July 2020, Alexandra von Teuffenbach, a former professor at the Pontifical Lateran University and the Pontifical Athenaeum Regina Apostolorum, alleged that Kentenich manipulated and coerced community members, specifically from the Schoenstatt Sisters of Mary, into sexually inappropriate conduct. Von Teuffenbach cited particular accusations found in documents of the archives of the Congregation for the Doctrine of the Faith after Pope Francis had allowed the consultation of documents concerning the pontificate of Pius XII. She also claimed that these accusations were the reason for Kentenich's investigation by Fr. Sebastiaan Tromp (Apostolic Visitator from the Holy See), in the 1950s and eventual separation from the Schoenstatt Movement during his exile from 1951 to 1965.

The possibility of sexual or psychological abuse was strongly denied by the General Presidency of the Schoenstatt Movement. In a formal statement the movement indicated that the allegations had long been known about and the fact that Kentenich was reinstated from exile by the Vatican in 1965 was evidence that the allegations were not considered true. It was also stated that at the opening of Kentenich's process of beatification in 1975 a nihil obstat ("no obstructions") was granted by the church and that this would not have been granted if the previously known accusations were found to have any substance.

The Schoenstatt Sisters of Mary also released their own formal statement. The Sisters emphatically rejected the accusations and said that "successive generations of our community have experienced the founder as an authentic and credible personality.” As with the statement from Schoenstatt's General Presidency, the Sisters noted that they were already aware of the allegations made against Kentenich and emphasized that when he was reinstated as the founder and returned from his exile in 1965, all accusations had already been considered by the Church and deemed insufficiently substantiated to make a formal accusation.

A few days after the reports and responses, the postulator of Kentenich's cause and key representatives of Schoenstatt met with Bishop Stephan Ackermann of the Diocese of Trier. The result was an announcement of an independent commission of historians, organized by the diocese, to review the beatification process of Kentenich. It will also be the task of the commission "to reconcile the newly found material with what has already been gathered and evaluated from other archives by the previous commission." At the end of their work, the commission "will write a report in which a statement will also be made about the personality and spirituality of Fr. Josef Kentenich as depicted in the collected documents."

Reacting to the announcement, Fr. Juan Pablo Catoggio (international president of the Schoenstatt Movement) issued a statement addressed to the “Schoenstatt Family throughout the world”, saying that “we very much welcome this decision of the bishop," since in this way "the clarification of the questions regarding the person and actions of Father Kentenich” can be found.

Fr. Eduardo Aguirre, postulator for the cause of beatification of Kentenich, pointed out that Kentenich was not formally accused by the Holy Office (at that time the highest tribunal of the Church), at any time before, during, or after the exile for immoral conduct of any form, including the mention of sexual misconduct or deviance of any kind. Aguirre claims that "any assertion to the contrary is simple false."

On 3 May 2022, the Bishop of Trier announced that Kentenich's sainthood process had been suspended because of the allegations of abuse.

== See also ==
- Karl Leisner
- John Pozzobon
- Franz Reinisch
- Francisco Javier Errázuriz Ossa
- Schoenstatt Shrine
- Pilgrim Mother Campaign
