= Augustin Schubert =

Czech priest who died in Dachau

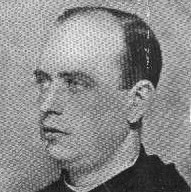
Fr. Augustin Schubert

Fr. Augustin Schubert, OSA, given name František (14 May 1902 – 28 July 1942), was a Czech Roman Catholic priest, a member of the Augustinian order, and a prior of the Augustinian monastery of St. Thomas in Malá Strana, Prague. He was also an educator in the Catholic Physical Education Association, Orel (Eagle). He was a critic of the Nazi regime, and as a result, was imprisoned and died in the Dachau Concentration Camp.

== Life prior to Nazi occupation ==
He was born on 14 May 1902 into the family of a railway official in Žižkov, a working-class district of Prague. His birth name was František. The family was of modest means, although enjoying better living conditions than many in the relatively poor neighborhood. His father, Václav, came from Chomutov, in the German-speaking border region. His mother, whose maiden name was Anna Macháčková, was of Czech descent. As a result, he spoke both Czech and German with native fluency.

Schubert studied philosophy at the Faculty of Philosophy at the former German-speaking branch of Charles University in Prague, and in 1925 he received a doctorate. On 28 August 1925 (the Feast of St. Augustine), he was admitted to the Augustinian order as Brother Augustin. He joined the Augustinian convent in Prague at the church of St. Thomas in Malá Strana. From November 1926 to August 1927 he studied theology at the University of Würzburg in Franconia in central Germany.

Schubert was ordained a priest on 20 January 1929. He celebrated his first Mass on 27 January. In addition to the monastery of St. Thomas, Schubert also served in monasteries in Česká Lípa and in Dolní Ročov in the Louny region. In 1932 he became the prior of St. Thomas, thus becoming responsible for the administration of not only the monastery but a parish of over 4,000 people.

He was an active member of the Catholic Gymnastics Organization Orel (i.e. Eagle), acting as a preacher, confessor, and moderator in the group. In 1932 he became the spiritual director of the Pospisel district. Orel was a patriotic association with a mission to positively mold Czechoslovak national character. It shared many similarities with the Sokol ('Falcon') movement, however, in contrast to the more secular Sokal, Orel intended to build national consciousness within an explicitly Christian context.

Schubert became a popular preacher in Prague (including in St. Vitus Cathedral), and in places of pilgrimage in Bohemia and Moravia.

== Opposition to Nazis ==
Despite his father's Sudeten German origins, Schubert was proud of his Czechoslovak identity and feared that Nazism would lead to the breakup of the state. He also believed in democracy, and was suspicious of Nazism's non-Christian ideology. For these reasons, he was an opponent of Nazism.

On 15 March 1939, the remaining Czech lands were occupied by German forces and reconstituted into the rump puppet-state of the Protectorate of Bohemia and Moravia, which was effectively under total Nazi control. On the day of occupation, Schubert celebrated mass, and spoke out against the occupation. The sermon became known among parishioners as the "Sermon of Tears", as it ended with Schubert breaking into tears and being unable to continue.

Nazi authorities were especially wary of the Orel organization because they feared its potential to organize opposition among Czech youth. As such, Schubert was closely watched by the Gestapo. Schubert continued to speak out in support of Czech national identity and religious feeling in both Prague and in pilgrimage sites, including celebrating a mass in November 1939 for students imprisoned during a raid on the universities.

== Arrest, internment, and death ==
The precise reasons for Schubert's arrest are not clear, however, he appears to have been considered a threat and a traitor by Nazi authorities. His investigation file reads:

"Schubert and CZerny, both of purely German origin, cast off their German nationality and have become Czechs. As with all renegades, they were also ferocious chauvinists of their new nationality and oppressors of every Germany movement in the Augustinian monastery."

— Fr. Augustine Schubert, OSA 1902-1042, by František Futera (2008)

Specific reasons proposed for his arrest include:

- Schubert's refusal to give up Augustinian Order property to the Reich in Sudetenland
- Schubert's influence and activity within the Orel movement, which was considered to be a center of resistance
- An insult Schubert made about German troops as they occupied Prague, reportedly saying "Look at this brown mud rolling in here!" - presumably a reference to Nazi Brownshirts.

Most likely his arrest was a result of a combination of the above factors and possibly other unknown factors. Schubert's comments were likely passed to the Gestapo by Werner Bobe, a priest of the Knights of Malta who had become an enthusiastic Nazi and a richly-rewarded informer who specialized in passing information on the Catholic Church to the authorities.

Schubert was arrested on 30 August 1940, by the Gestapo and charged with insulting the German army. Initially imprisoned in Pankrac Prison in Prague, he was handed over to a military court which acquitted him of the charges. Despite this, the Gestapo kept him in so-called protective custody and sent him on to Terezín, a Czech fortress-town that had been converted into use for the concentration camp system. In April 1941, he was transferred to the Sachsenhausen concentration camp near Berlin, and in August of that year, was transferred to Dachau Concentration Camp. While initially assigned to a normal labor block, he eventually ended up in the Priest Barracks, whose occupants were often singled out for abuse by Kapos and guards.

Schubert's health declined due to the stress, beatings, hard labor, and inhumane conditions. He made several attempts to enter the hospital but was denied. Eventually, he was admitted to the hospital, where a large hernia caused by overwork was discovered, and an X-ray revealed advanced tuberculosis. He was not given treatment but instead transferred to Block 7/1, which was reserved for hopeless cases. Alois Cuce, another Czech imprisoned in Dachau, worked as a nurse in the hospital. Through bribery, he succeeded in getting Schubert transferred to a hospital block reserved for tuberculosis treatment. This intervention, however, was too late, and Schubert died on 28 July 1942, at the age of 40.

He is currently in the process of beatification.
