= Hradec nad Svitavou =

- Municipality
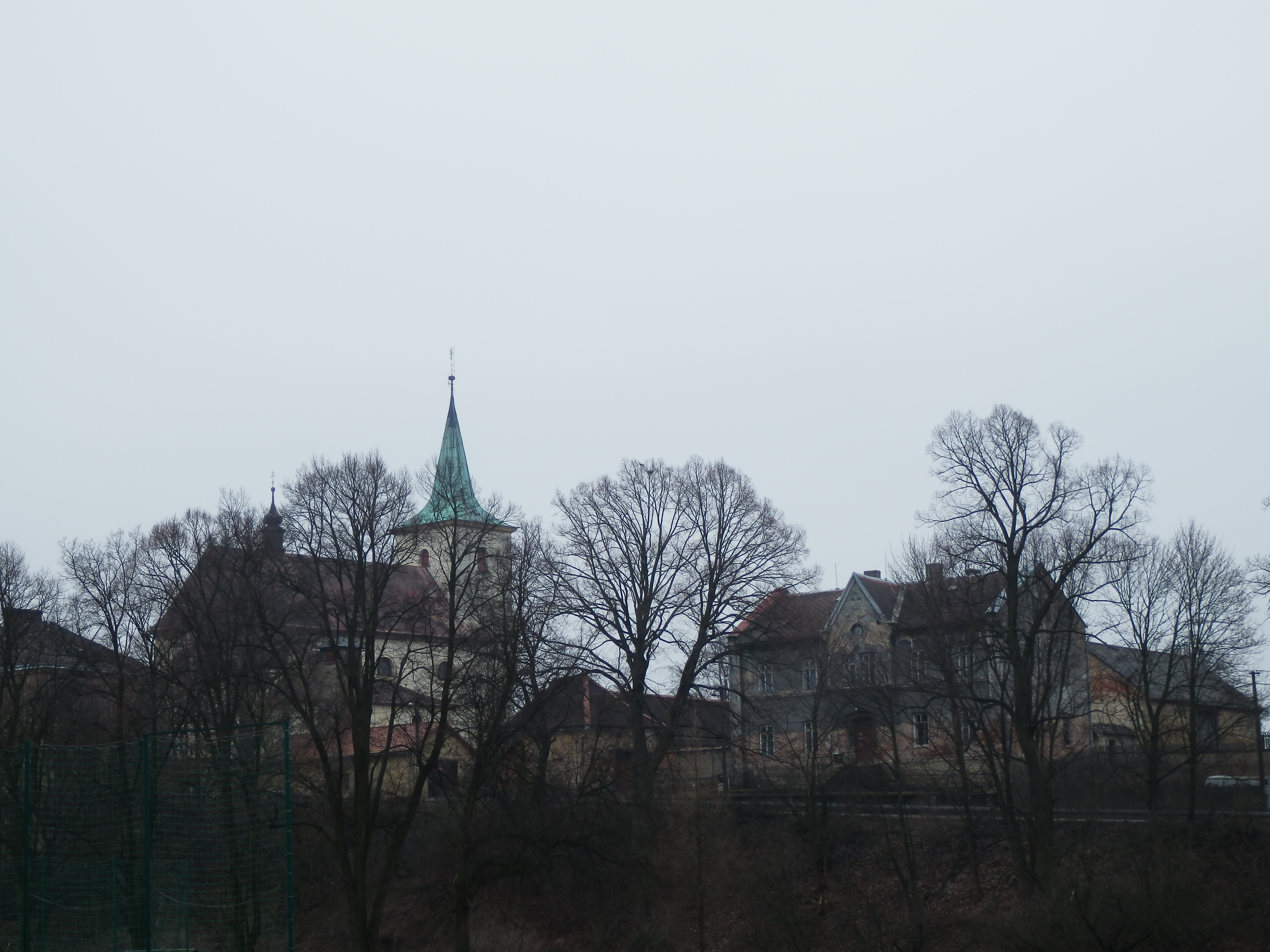
- Church of Saint Catherine

- Flag Coat of arms

- Location in the Czech Republic
- Coordinates: 49°42′41″N 16°28′50″E
- Country: Czech Republic
- Region: Pardubice
- District: Svitavy
- First mentioned: 1270

Area
  - Total: 24.71 km^{2} (9.54 sq mi)
- Elevation: 420 m (1,380 ft)

Population (2026-01-01)
  - Total: 1,663
  - Density: 67.30/km^{2} (174.3/sq mi)
- Time zone: UTC+1 (CET)
  - Summer (DST): UTC+2 (CEST)
- Postal code: 569 01
- Website: www.hradecnadsvitavou.cz

Hradec nad Svitavou (German: Greifendorf) is a municipality and village in Svitavy District in the Pardubice Region of the Czech Republic. It has about 1,700 inhabitants.

Hradec nad Svitavou lies approximately 6 kilometres (4 mi) south of Svitavy, 63 km (39 mi) south-east of Pardubice, and 154 km (96 mi) east of Prague.

== Demographics ==
Historical population
Year	Pop.	±%
1869	2,466	—
1880	2,539	+3.0%
1890	2,666	+5.0%
1900	2,793	+4.8%
1910	2,805	+0.4%
1921	2,549	−9.1%
1930	2,799	+9.8%
1950	1,826	−34.8%
1961	1,979	+8.4%
1970	1,804	−8.8%
1980	1,745	−3.3%
1991	1,622	−7.0%
2001	1,641	+1.2%
2011	1,664	+1.4%
2021	1,611	−3.2%
Source: Censuses

== Notable people ==
- Engelmar Unzeitig (1911–1945), German priest
