= Bernhard Lichtenberg =

German Catholic priest and opponent of Nazism (1875–1943)

Blessed Bernhard Lichtenberg
- Bernhard Lichtenberg (photograph in the Diocesan archives)

Martyr
- Born: 3 December 1875; Ohlau, Prussian Silesia, Kingdom of Prussia, German Empire
- Died: 5 November 1943 (aged 67); Hof, Bavaria, while being transported from Berlin to Dachau concentration camp, Germany
- Venerated in: Roman Catholic Church
- Beatified: 23 June 1996, Germany, by Pope John Paul II
- Major shrine: St. Hedwig's Cathedral, Berlin
- Feast: 5 November

Bernhard Lichtenberg (German: [ˈbɛʁn.haʁt ˈlɪçtn̩ˌbɛʁk]; 3 December 1875 – 5 November 1943) was a German Catholic priest known for his outspoken opposition to the Nazi regime’s persecution of Jews and other marginalized groups during the Holocaust. He became a notable symbol of religious liberty for his public condemnation of the Nazi government’s policies, including from the pulpit of St. Hedwig’s Cathedral in Berlin. Despite widespread fear and suppression, Lichtenberg openly called for justice and the humane treatment of Jewish citizens.

Lichtenberg was arrested and imprisoned for his activism and later died in Gestapo custody while being transported to Dachau concentration camp. His death further cemented his reputation as a martyr for religious freedom and human rights. Raul Hilberg wrote: "Thus a solitary figure had made his singular gesture. In the buzz of rumormongers and sensation seekers, Bernhard Lichtenberg fought almost alone."

In 1996, Lichtenberg was beatified by the Catholic Church for his steadfast faith and moral courage. He was also recognized as Righteous Among the Nations by Yad Vashem in 2004 for his efforts to aid Jews during the Holocaust, making him one of the few individuals honored for moral resistance across both religious and cultural communities.

== Early life and education ==
Lichtenberg was born in Ohlau (now Oława), Prussian Silesia, near Breslau (now Wrocław), the second of five children. He studied theology in Innsbruck, Austria-Hungary. He also studied in Breslau and was ordained in 1899.

== Ministry ==
=== Appointments ===
Lichtenberg began his ministry in Berlin in 1900, as the pastor of Charlottenburg. He served as a military chaplain during World War I. During the period of 1913–1930, he was a minister at the cathedral Herz-Jesu-Gemeinde (Sacred Heart) in Charlottenburg, Berlin. In 1932, the Bishop of Berlin appointed him as a canon of the Cathedral chapter of St. Hedwig.

=== Activism ===
Lichtenberg's encouragement of Catholics to view a screening of the film version of Erich Maria Remarques' anti-war novel All Quiet on the Western Front prompted a vicious attack by Joseph Goebbels' paper Der Angriff. In 1933 the Secret State Police of Germany (Gestapo) had searched his house for the first time.

Active in the Centre Party, in 1935 he went to Hermann Göring to protest against the cruelties of the Esterwegen concentration camp.

Named provost of the cathedral, in 1938, Lichtenberg was put in charge of the Relief Office of the Berlin episcopate, which assisted many Catholics of Jewish descent in emigrating from the Third Reich. After Kristallnacht, the first organized Nazi pogrom in Germany, Lichtenberg warned at the Berlin Church of Saint Hedwig: "The synagogue outside is burning, and that is also a house of God!" Until his arrest in October 1941, Lichtenberg would pray publicly for the persecuted Jews at the daily Vespers service. Bishop Konrad von Preysing later entrusted him with the task of helping the Jewish community of the city.

He protested in person to Nazi officials against the arrest and killing of the sick and mentally ill, as well as the persecution of the Jews. At first, the Nazis dismissed the priest as a nuisance. Father Lichtenberg was warned that he was in danger of being arrested for his activities, but he continued nonetheless.

In 1941, Lichtenberg protested against the involuntary euthanasia programme by way of a letter to the chief physician of the Reich, Minister of Public Health Leonardo Conti (1900–1945):

I, as a human being, a Christian, a priest, and a German, demand of you, Chief Physician of the Reich, that you answer for the crimes that have been perpetrated at your bidding, and with your consent, and which will call forth the vengeance of the Lord on the heads of the German people.

The euthanasia in the health institutions of Nazi Germany was purportedly stopped soon after the church protests against euthanasia headed by the bishops Clemens August Graf von Galen and Theophil Wurm. "Nazi leaders faced the prospect of either having to imprison prominent, highly admired clergymen and other protesters – a course with consequences in terms of adverse public reaction they greatly feared – or else end the programme".

=== Arrest and imprisonment ===
Lichtenberg was arrested on 23 October 1941 and sentenced to two years in prison for violation of the Pulpit Law and the Treachery Act of 1934. He asked to accompany Jews to the East in order to provide comfort there. Because he was considered incorrigible, he was picked up in 1943 by the Gestapo to be taken to the Dachau concentration camp. He fell ill and died of pneumonia in hospital in Hof, Bavaria.

== Veneration ==
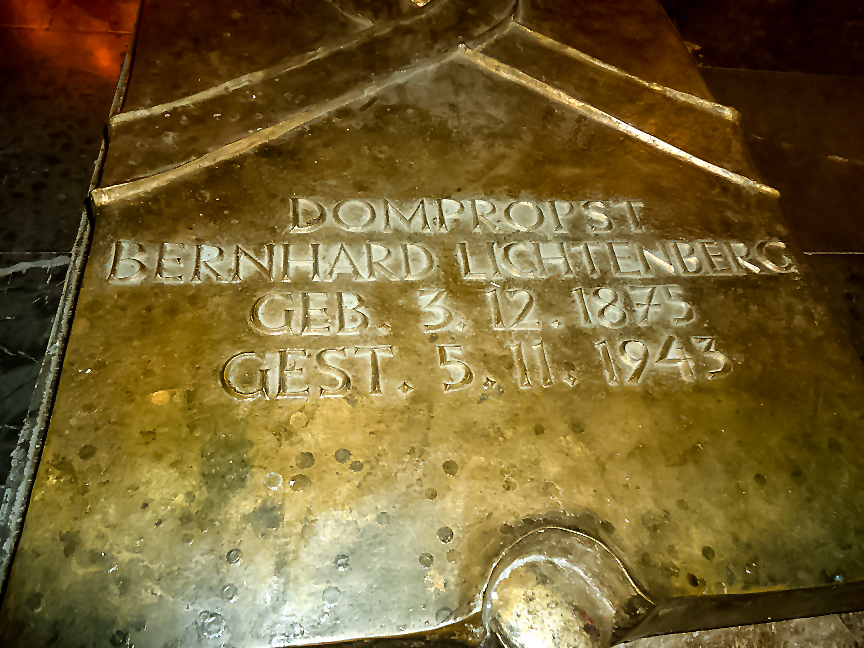
Tomb of Bernhard Lichtenberg in the crypt of Saint Hedwig's Cathedral, Berlin

On 23 June 1996, Pope John Paul II beatified Bernhard Lichtenberg and Karl Leisner as martyrs. The beatification ceremony took place during a Mass celebrated in the Olympic Stadium in Berlin. The date of his death, 5 November, was designated as the liturgical feast of Bernard Lichtenberg. The postulator of Lichtenberg's canonisation case is Gotthard Klein.

Lichtenberg's tomb is situated in the crypt of St. Hedwig's Cathedral in Berlin. After the war, the building with the office of the archbishop of Berlin was named "Bernhard Lichtenberg House". In the memorial area of the former Esterwegen Concentration Camp, a memorial plaque was installed to honor Lichtenberg for his activities for the prisoners of the camp.

In the historic center of the town of Hof, the area in front of St. Mary's church has been named Bernhard-Lichtenberg-Platz since 2013 and on the initiative of pastor Hans-Jürgen Wiedow, a new parish center named after Bernhard Lichtenberg was constructed in 2016/17 under the St. Konrad's church in the town.

On 7 July 2004, Yad Vashem recognized Bernhard Lichtenberg as a Righteous Among the Nations.

On the occasion of the 150th birthday of Blessed Bernhard Lichtenberg on 3 December 2025, a special postage stamp was issued. The stamp features a quote from the Beatified: "A person's actions are the consequences of their principles."

=== Compositions ===
- Motet: Psalm 59. Mit zwei Meditationen von Bernhard Lichtenberg. For soprano solo, choir, organ and instruments, from Helge Jung, Berlin 1988. (Prolog: Die grüne Saat, Psalm: Errette mich, mein Gott, beschütze mich, Epilog I: Gott ist die Liebe, Epilog II: Wer mich vor den Menschen bekennt). First performance: Choir of the St. Hedwig's Cathedral Berlin, director: Michael Witt.
- Song: Dein Volk die dunklen Zeiten. Text and music: Florian Wilkes, Berlin 1995.
- Song: Lasst uns den sel'gen Bernhard loben. Words: Josef Steiner, Berlin 1996. Melody: Gotteslob, no. 262, tune according to Loys Bourgeois 1551. In: Diözesananhang zum Gotteslob des Erzbistums Berlin.
- Cantata: Wer glaubt kann widerstehn. For Spiker, vocal-solo, choir (SATB) and instruments from Ludger Stühlmeyer, Hof 1999. First performance: 31. Oktober 1999, ZDF, conzertchoir of the Hofer Symphoniker, director: Gottfried Hoffmann.
- Song: Gepriesen bist du, herrlicher Gott, für Bernhard, den seligen Priester. Word: Alois Albrecht, Bamberg 2012, melody: Ludger Stühlmeyer, Hof 2012.
- Vespers: Ludger Stühlmeyer, Gerechter unter den Völkern. Vesper zu Ehren des seligen Bernhard Lichtenberg. Mit einer Biografie und Zitaten. Geleitwort von Nuntius Eterovic. Verlag Sankt Michaelsbund, München 2017, ISBN 978-3-943135-90-9.

== See also ==
- Catholic resistance to Nazi Germany
- Rescue of Jews by Catholics during the Holocaust
