= Gabriel Piguet =

- Bishop of Clermont
- Church: Catholic Church
- Diocese: Diocese of Clermont-Ferrand
- Appointed: 7 April,1933
- Installed: 7 December,1933
- Term ended: 3 July,1952
- Predecessor: Jean-François-Etienne Marnas
- Successor: Pierre-Abel-Louis Chappot de la Chanonie

Orders
- Ordination: 2 July,1910
- Consecration: 27 February,1934 by Hyacinthe-Jean Chassagnon

Personal details
- Born: Gabriel Emmanuel Joseph Piguet; 24 February, 1887 Mâcon, France
- Died: 3 July, 1952 Clermont-Ferrand, France

Gabriel Piguet (French pronunciation: [ɡabʁijɛl piɡɛ]; (24 Feb 1887 at Mâcon, died 3 July 1952 at Clermont-Ferrand) was the Roman Catholic Bishop of Clermont-Ferrand, France. Involved in Catholic resistance to Nazism, he was imprisoned in the Priest Barracks of Dachau concentration camp in 1944.

He was honoured as a Righteous Gentile on 22 June 2001, by Yad Vashem, Israel's Holocaust Memorial.

During the Second World War, Piguet allowed Jewish children to be hidden from the Nazis at the Saint Marguerite Catholic boarding school in Clermont-Ferrand. He was arrested by German police in his Cathedral on 28 May 1944 for the crime of giving aid to a priest wanted by the Gestapo. Imprisoned first in Clermont-Ferrand, he was deported to Dachau concentration camp in September.

At Dachau, Piguet presided over the secret ordination of Blessed Karl Leisner, who died soon after the liberation of the camp. He survived his imprisonment, though physically diminished - he had lost 35 kg. He died seven years later.

Gabriel Piguet

== See also ==
- French Resistance
- Catholic resistance to Nazism
