= Schoenstatt Shrine =

Type of chapel

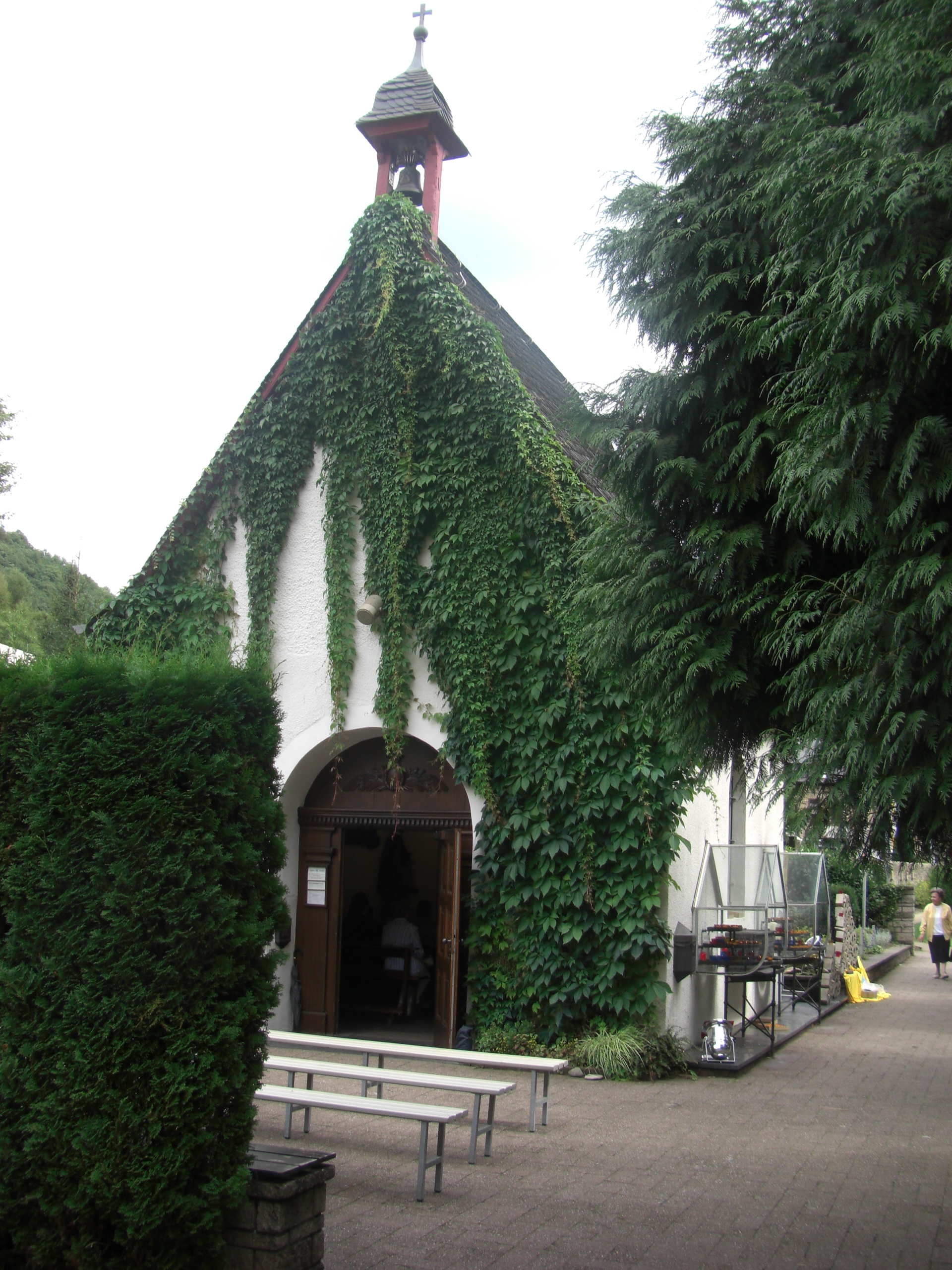
Original Schoenstatt Shrine in Vallendar

A Schoenstatt Shrine is a Catholic shrine and a characteristic building of the Schoenstatt Apostolic Movement founded in 1914 by Josef Kentenich in Vallendar, Rhineland-Palatinate, Germany. In 2025, there are 202 Schoenstatt Shrines in the world, the most famous being the Original (Schoenstatt) Shrine (German: Urheiligtum) in Vallendar.

The Shrine is where the Blessed Virgin Mary is invoked for protection and influence, and is a visual icon for devotion within the movement.

== History ==
Father Josef Kentenich was the spiritual director of a minor seminary of the Pallottine Fathers preparing missionaries for Africa. In April 1914, a Marian sodality was formed at the seminary, and the superior offered the sodality the Chapel of Saint Michael near the school. Father Kentenich was inspired by the work of Bartolo Longo in creating the Shrine to Our Lady of the Rosary of Pompeii, and wished to create a shrine to the Virgin Mary at Schoenstatt.

A central point in the movement's dynamics and faith is the devotion to the Original Shrine where the movement started, and of which there are around 200 similar replicas around the world.
