= A Hidden Life (2019 film) =

2019 film by Terrence Malick

- Theatrical release poster
- Directed by: Terrence Malick
- Written by: Terrence Malick
- Produced by: Elisabeth Bentley; Dario Bergesio; Grant Hill; Josh Jeter
- Starring: August Diehl; Valerie Pachner; Matthias Schoenaerts
- Cinematography: Jörg Widmer
- Edited by: Rehman Nizar Ali; Joe Gleason; Sebastian Jones
- Music by: James Newton Howard
- Production companies: Elizabeth Bay Productions; Aceway; Studio Babelsberg
- Distributed by: Fox Searchlight Pictures (United States); Pandora Film (Germany)
- Release dates: May 19, 2019 (Cannes); December 13, 2019 (United States)
- Running time: 174 minutes
- Countries: United States; Germany; Austria
- Languages: English; German
- Budget: $7–9 million
- Box office: $4.6 million

A Hidden Life is a 2019 epic historical drama film written and directed by Terrence Malick. It stars August Diehl, Valerie Pachner, and Matthias Schoenaerts, with Michael Nyqvist and Bruno Ganz in their final performances. The film depicts the life of Franz Jägerstätter, an Austrian farmer and devout Catholic who refused to fight for the Nazis in World War II.

The title is taken from George Eliot's Middlemarch:

... for the growing good of the world is partly dependent on unhistoric acts; and that things are not so ill with you and me as they might have been, is half owing to the number who lived faithfully a hidden life, and rest in unvisited tombs.

The film premiered at the 2019 Cannes Film Festival on May 19, and was theatrically released in the United States on December 13. It received critical acclaim upon release.

== Plot ==
Austrian peasant farmer Franz Jägerstätter, born and brought up in the small village of St. Radegund, is working his land when war breaks out. Married to Franziska, colloquially Fani, the couple are important members of the tight-knit rural community. They live a simple life with the passing years marked by the arrival of the couple's three girls.

Franz is called up for basic training in the German army and is away from his beloved wife and children for months. Eventually, when France surrenders and it seems the war might end soon, he is sent back from training.

With his mother and sister-in-law Resie, he and his wife farm the land and raise their children amid the mountains and valleys of upper Austria, cutting hay and gathering. As the war goes on, Jägerstätter and the other able-bodied men in the village are called up to fight. Their first requirement is to swear an oath of allegiance to Adolf Hitler and the Third Reich.

Despite pressure from the mayor and his neighbors, who increasingly ostracize him and his family, and from the Bishop of Linz, Jägerstätter refuses. Wrestling with the knowledge that his decision will mean arrest and even death, he finds strength in his faith in God, his prayers, and Fani's love and support.

Franz is taken to prison, first in Enns, then in Berlin and waits months for his trial. During his time in prison, he and Fani write letters to each other and give each other strength. Fani and their daughters are victims of growing hostility in the village over her husband's decision not to fight. Fani is eventually able to visit her husband in Berlin.

After months of brutal incarceration, Jägerstätter's case goes to trial. He is found guilty and sentenced to death. Despite many opportunities to sign the oath of allegiance, and the promise of non-combatant work, he continues to refuse and is executed by the Third Reich on August 9, 1943, while his wife and daughters survive.

== Cast ==
- August Diehl as Franz Jägerstätter
- Valerie Pachner as Franziska Jägerstätter
- Michael Nyqvist as Bishop Joseph Fliesser
- Jürgen Prochnow as Major Schlegel
- Matthias Schoenaerts as Captain Herder
- Bruno Ganz as Judge Werner Lueben
- Martin Wuttke as Major Kiel
- Alexander Fehling as Fredrich Feldmann
- Maria Simon as Resie
- Franz Rogowski as Waldland
- Tobias Moretti as Priest Ferdinand Fürthauer
- Ulrich Matthes as Lorenz Schwaninger
- Max Mauff as Sterz
- Johan Leysen as Ohlendorf
- Sophie Rois as Aunt
- Karl Markovics as Mayor
- Alexander Radszun as Executioner
- Joel Basman as Military Trainee
- Waldemar Kobus as Stein
- Johannes Krisch as Miller

== Production ==
=== Development ===
On June 23, 2016, reports emerged that the film, then titled Radegund, would depict the life of Austria's Franz Jägerstätter, a conscientious objector during World War II who was put to death at age 36 for undermining military actions, and was later declared a martyr and beatified by the Catholic Church. It was announced that August Diehl was set to play Jägerstätter and Valerie Pachner to play his wife, Franziska Jägerstätter. Jörg Widmer was appointed as the director of photography, having worked in all of Malick's films since The New World (2005) as a camera operator.

=== Writing ===
Malick said A Hidden Life would have a more structured narrative than his previous works: "Lately—I keep insisting, only very lately—have I been working without a script and I've lately repented the idea. The last picture we shot, and we're now cutting, went back to a script that was very well ordered." This makes it his first linear, plot-driven film since The New World (2005). He added, "There's a lot of strain when working without a script because you can lose track of where you are. It's very hard to coordinate with others who are working on the film. Production designers and location managers arrive in the morning and don't know what we're going to shoot or where we're going to shoot. The reason we did it was to try and get moments that are spontaneous and free. As a movie director, you always feel with a script that you're trying to fit a square peg into a round hole. And with no script, there's no round hole, there's just air. But I'm backing away from that style now."

Malick obtained rights to the book Franz Jägerstätter: Letters and Writings from Prison, edited by Erna Putz, for the film.

=== Filming ===
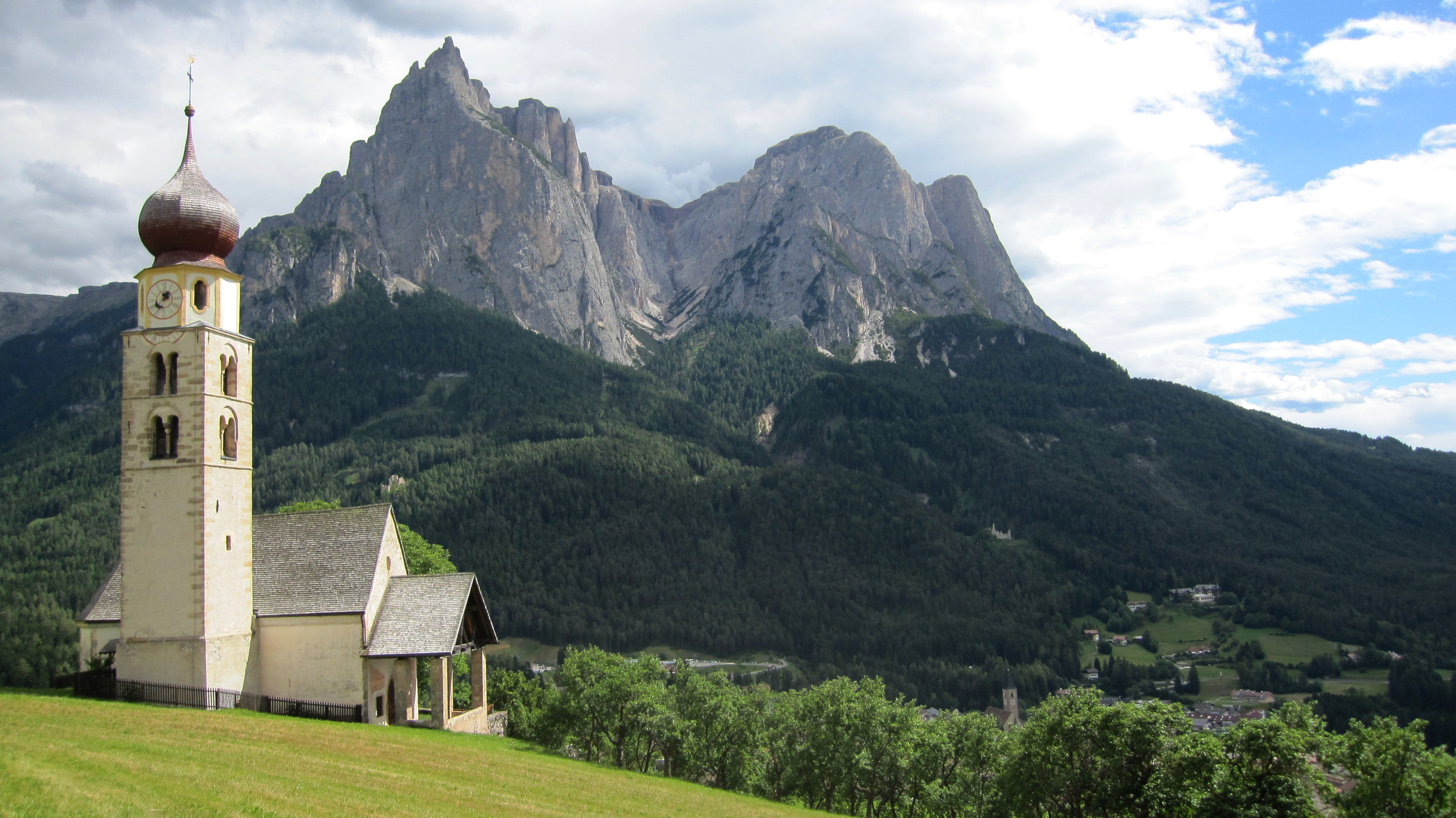
The church of St. Valentin in Seis am Schlern

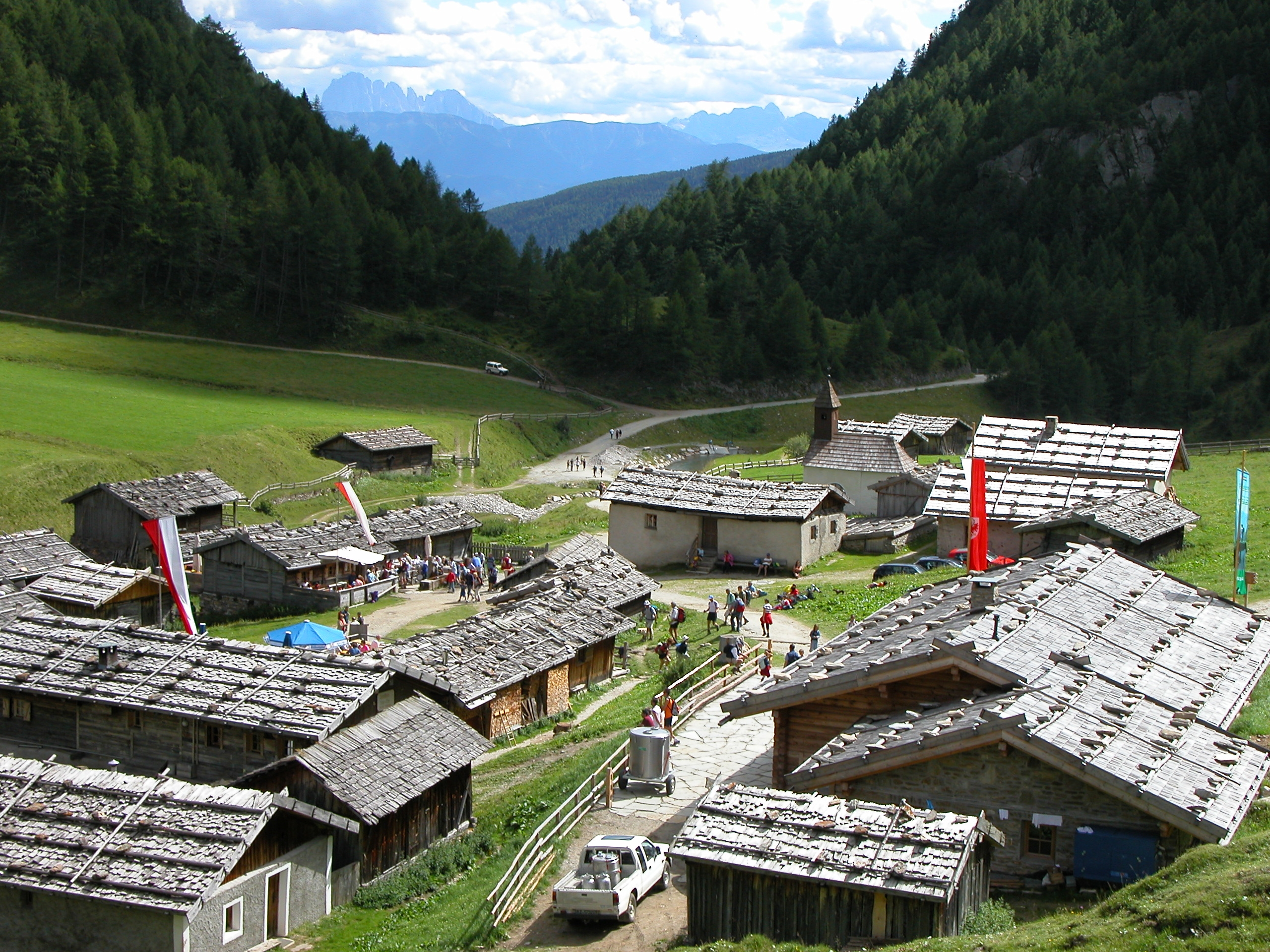
The Fane Alm in Mühlbach

The film began production in Studio Babelsberg in Potsdam, Germany, in summer 2016. From 11 July to 19 August 2016 the production shot on location in South Tyrol. Locations there were the church of St. Valentin in Seis am Schlern, the valley of Gsies, the village of Rodeneck, the mills in Terenten, the meadows of Albions in Lajen, the Seiser Alm, the Taufers Castle, the Fane Alm in Mühlbach, the Puez-Geisler Nature Park, the renaissance Velthurns Castle in the village of Feldthurns, the Franzensfeste Fortress, the gardens of the bishop's Hofburg in Brixen and the Neustift cloister.

In August 2016, reports emerged that some of the film's scenes were shot in the small Italian mountain village of Sappada.

=== Post-production ===
Actor Franz Rogowski said in a March 2019 interview that no one knew how the film would turn out or when it would be released, considering that it had been in post-production for more than two years at that point. Rogowski added that Malick is "a director who creates spaces rather than produces scenes; his editing style is like that."

== Music ==
The film's score is by James Newton Howard and features violinist James Ehnes, who also performed Howard's violin concerto released in 2018. It was released by Sony Classical Records on December 6, 2019. Of the score, Howard said, "It is a spiritual-sounding score ... Terry often spoke about the suffering inherent in love, and you feel yearning, suffering and love in that piece". The score features 40 minutes of original score mixed with selected classical works by Bach, Handel, Dvořák, Górecki, Pärt and others. It was recorded at Abbey Road Studios in London in one day in June 2018 with a 40-piece string section conducted by Pete Anthony with Shawn Murphy as score mixer.

== Release ==
A Hidden Life premiered in competition at the 72nd Cannes Film Festival on May 19, 2019. The following day, Fox Searchlight Pictures acquired rights for the U.S. and several other regions for $12–14 million in a competitive situation that also included A24, Netflix, Paramount Pictures, Sony Pictures Classics, and Focus Features. The film screened at the Vatican Film Library on December 4, 2019, with Malick making a rare public appearance to introduce the film. It was released in limited release in the U.S. on December 13, 2019, followed by a wide release in January.

== Reception ==
=== Critical response ===
On review aggregation website Rotten Tomatoes, the film holds an approval rating of 82% based on 234 reviews, with an average rating of 7.5/10. The site's critical consensus reads, "Ambitious and visually absorbing, A Hidden Life may prove inscrutable to non-devotees—but for viewers on Malick's wavelength, it should only further confirm his genius." On Metacritic, the film has a weighted average score of 80 out of 100, based on 44 critics, indicating "generally favorable" reviews.

Peter DeBruge of Variety writes: "Whether or not he is specifically referring to the present day, its demagogues, and the way certain evangelicals have once again sold out their core values for political advantage, A Hidden Life feels stunningly relevant as it thrusts this problem into the light."

Jägerstätter biographer Erna Putz was touched by the film's spirituality after a private screening in June 2019, saying that Malick had made an "independent and universal work". She also considered Diehl's and Pachner's performances to be accurate representations of who Franz and Franziska were ("Franz, as I know him from the letters, and Franziska, as I know from encounters").

=== Accolades ===
Award	Date of ceremony	Category	Recipient(s)	Result	Ref(s)
Alliance of Women Film Journalists	2020	Best Cinematography	Jörg Widmer	Nominated	
Austin Film Critics Association	January 7, 2020	Austin Film Award	Terrence Malick	Won	
Belgian Film Critics Association	28 December 2020	Grand Prix	A Hidden Life	Nominated	
Cannes Film Festival	25 May 2019	François Chalais Prize	Terrence Malick	Won	
Cannes Film Festival	25 May 2019	Prize of the Ecumenical Jury	Terrence Malick	Won	
Cannes Film Festival	25 May 2019	Palme d'Or	Terrence Malick	Nominated	
CinEuphoria Awards	2020	Best Film - International Competition	Grant Hill, Dario Bergesio, Josh Jeter, Elisabeth Bentley, Terrence Malick	Nominated	
CinEuphoria Awards	2020	Best Actor - International Competition	August Diehl	Nominated	
CinEuphoria Awards	2020	Best Actress - International Competition	Valerie Pachner	Nominated	
Denver Film Critics Society	January 14, 2019	Best Adapted Screenplay	Terrence Malick	Nominated	
Diagonale	2020	Diagonale Grand Prize	Terrence Malick	Nominated	
Florida Film Critics Circle Awards	December 19, 2019	Best Adapted Screenplay	Terrence Malick	Nominated	
Florida Film Critics Circle Awards	December 19, 2019	Best Cinematography	Jörg Widmer	Nominated	
Georgia Film Critics Association Awards	January 10, 2020	Best Picture	A Hidden Life	Nominated	
Georgia Film Critics Association Awards	January 10, 2020	Best Cinematography	Jörg Widmer	Nominated	
Hawaii Film Critics Society	January 13, 2020	Best Cinematography	Jörg Widmer	Nominated	
Independent Spirit Awards	February 8, 2020	Best Feature	Elisabeth Bentley, Dario Bergesio, Grant Hill and Josh Jeter	Nominated	
International Film Music Critics Association	February 20, 2020	Best Original Score For A Drama Film	A Hidden Life	Nominated	
International Film Music Critics Association	February 20, 2020	Film Music Composition of the Year	James Newton Howard	Nominated	
Motion Picture Sound Editors	2020	Outstanding Achievement in Sound Editing - Sound Effects and Foley for Feature Film	Brad Engleking, Bob Kellough, David Forshee, Dusty Albertz, Bastien Benkhelil	Nominated	
MovieGuide Awards	February 24, 2020	Most Inspiring Movie	A Hidden Life	Nominated	
MovieGuide Awards	February 24, 2020	Best Movie for Mature Audiences	A Hidden Life	Nominated	
National Board of Review	December 3, 2019	Top Ten Independent Films	A Hidden Life	Won	
Phoenix Film Critics Society Awards	December 14, 2019	Best Cinematography	Jörg Widmer	Nominated	
Romy Gala	2020	Favorite Actress	Valerie Pachner	Nominated	
San Francisco Film Critics Circle	December 16, 2019	Best Cinematography	Jörg Widmer	Nominated	
Women's Image Network Awards	2020	Actress Feature Film	Valerie Pachner	Nominated	
