= Andreas-Hofer-Bund =

Anti-nazi organization in South Tyrol

The Andreas-Hofer-Bund was an anti-Nazi organization founded in South Tyrol, Italy in 1939.

The movement was guided by Hans Egarter, of Niederdorf, the diocesan secretary of the Catholic Youth, to defend the Dableiber, those ethnic Germans who wished to remain in Tyrol, rather than take the "option" to emigrate to the Third Reich. This made him a "traitor" in the eyes of the Nazis. Other participants in the movement were Friedl Volgger, Alois Puff, Blessed Josef Mayr-Nusser, and Erich Amonn.

The movement was still active in 1943, when South Tyrol was incorporated into the Operationszone Alpenvorland, and began to be exposed to the anti-partisan activities of the occupying German authorities. In the fall of 1943 the Bund had between 30 and 40 members. Egarter and his closest collaborators, however, still managed to come into contact with the Austrian Patria resistance movement and with the British and American intelligence services.
