= Franz Jägerstätter =

Austrian conscientious objector and Catholic martyr (1907–1943)

Blessed Franz Jägerstätter Third Order of Saint Francis
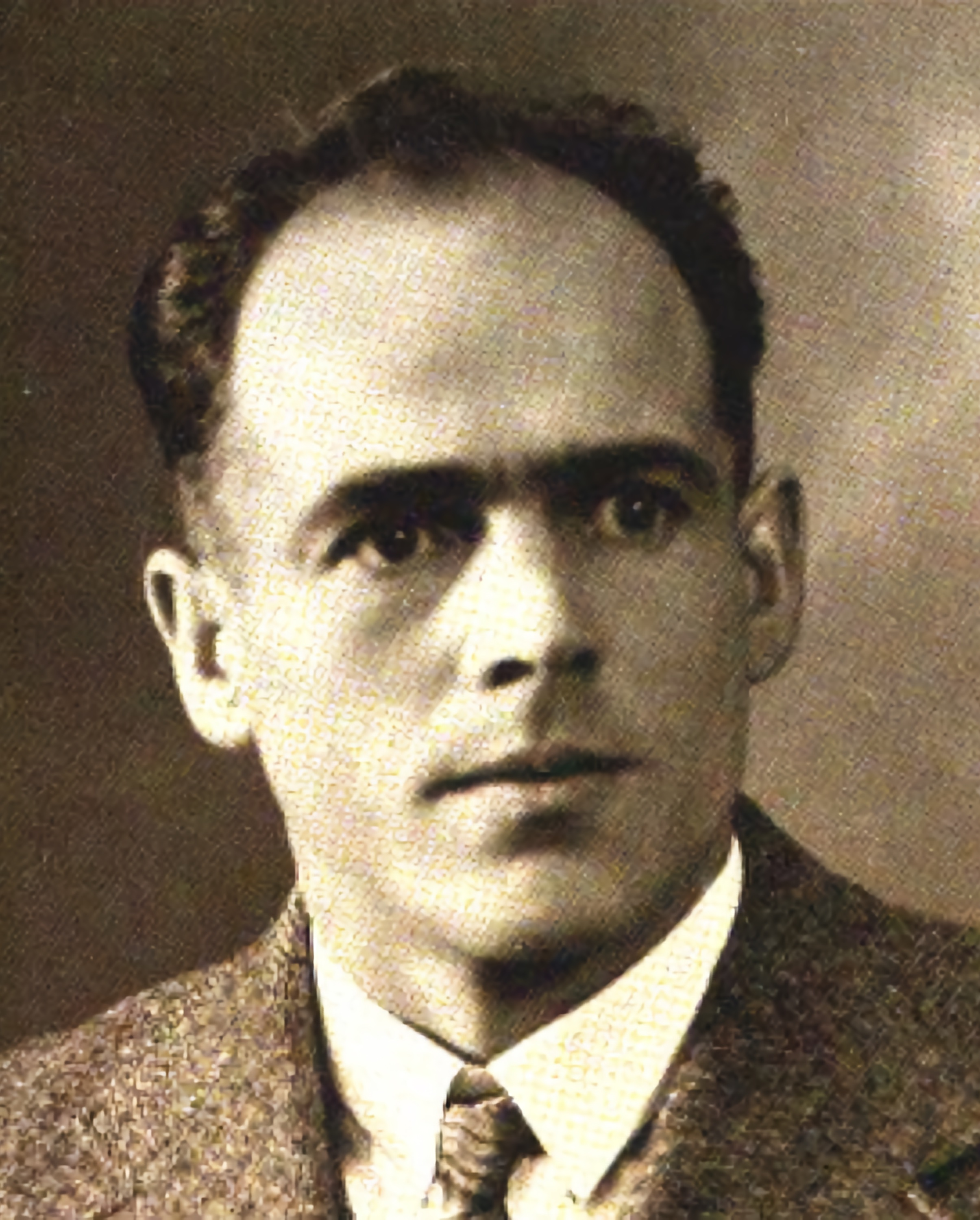
- Portrait of Jägerstätter, before 1942

Martyr
- Born: Franz Huber; 20 May 1907; Sankt Radegund, Archduchy of Austria above the Enns, Austria-Hungary
- Died: 9 August 1943 (aged 36); Brandenburg an der Havel, Province of Brandenburg, Nazi Germany
- Venerated in: Catholic Church
- Beatified: 26 October 2007, Cathedral of the Immaculate Conception, Linz, Austria by Cardinal José Saraiva Martins (on behalf of Pope Benedict XVI)
- Feast: 21 May

Franz Jägerstätter, TOSF (also spelled Jaegerstaetter in English; born Franz Huber, 20 May 1907 – 9 August 1943) was an Austrian farmer and conscientious objector during World War II. Jägerstätter refused to fight for Nazi Germany because of his devout Catholic faith, leading to him getting sentenced to death and executed. He is venerated as a martyr and has been beatified by the Catholic Church.

== Life ==
=== Early life and education ===
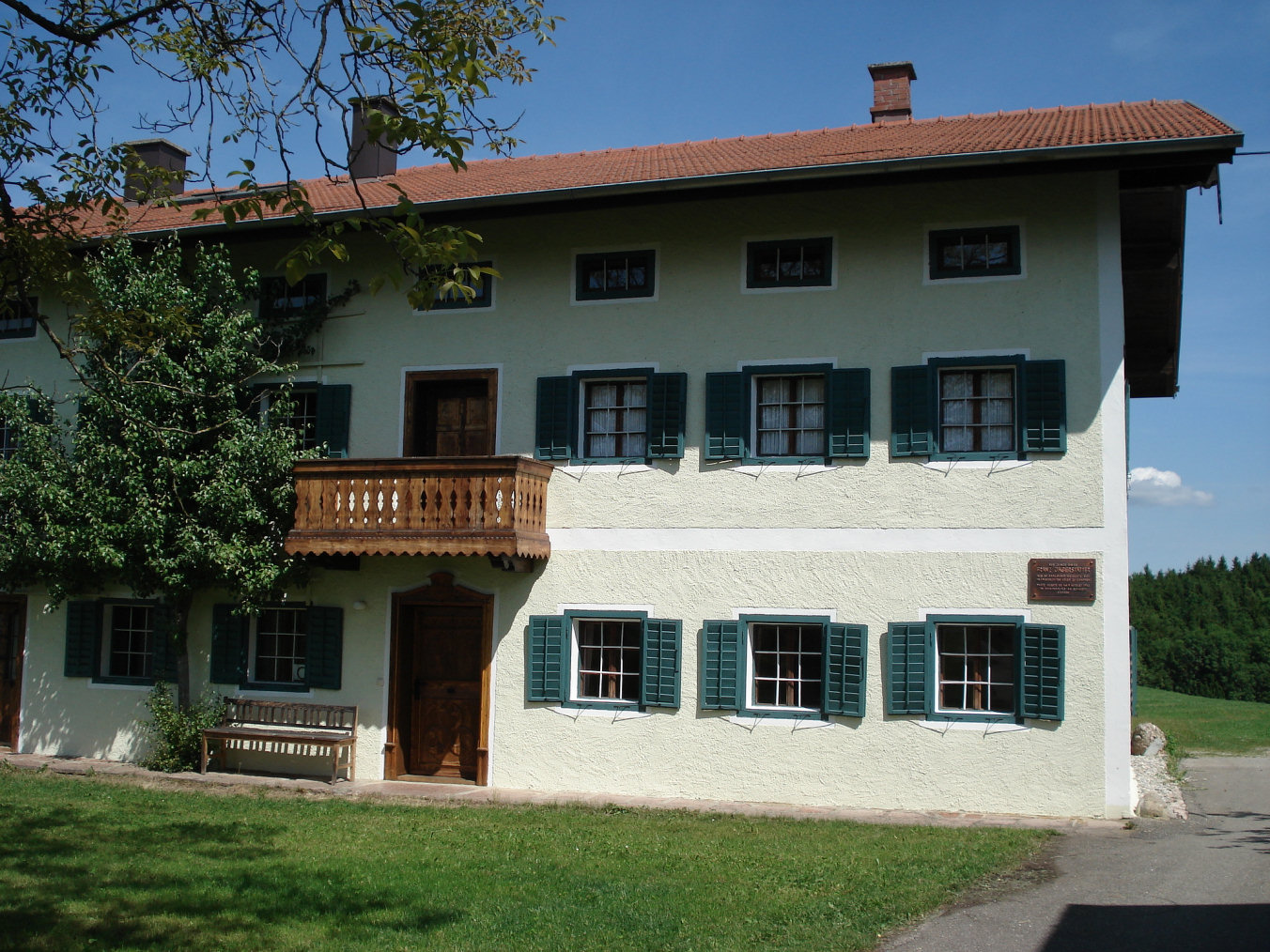
Jägerstätter farmstead in St. Radegund

Jägerstätter's mother was an unmarried chambermaid named Rosalia Huber who lived in Sankt Radegund, Upper Austria, a small village between Salzburg and Braunau am Inn where nearly everyone was Catholic. His father was Franz Bachmeier from Tarsdorf, the unmarried son of a farmer. He was born on 20 May 1907 in Huber's parents' home, and baptised in the parish church the next day under the name of St Francis Caracciolo. As his parents could not afford a marriage, Franz was first cared for by his grandmother, Elisabeth Huber, who had a reputation as an exceptionally devout woman. His biological father was killed in World War I in 1915, when Franz was seven or eight years old. In 1917, his mother married Heinrich Jägerstätter. As the marriage didn't result in children of Jägerstätter's own, he adopted his wife's son and gave over the farm to him after Franz married in 1936.

As a boy, Franz was a higher-than-average student and an avid reader, apparently leaving school after his 14th birthday, as permitted by law. His fellow villagers remembered the Franz of early manhood fondly as "a jolly, robust, fun-loving, hot-blooded, 'he-man' type", intelligent and "bull-headed", who tended to be "ahead of the crowd" in his interests and to wish to be the first to try something new; he was the first in his village to own a motorcycle. While he regularly went to Mass, there was little to foreshadow the devotion he was known for in later years, and he once embarrassed the pastor of the village by asking him about the possibility that the Virgin Mary had other children after Jesus. In 1922, he participated in the local Passion play, acting as one of the soldiers who cast lots for the seamless robe of Jesus.

The young Franz was also remembered as a good fighter. On one occasion, he spent several days in jail as a consequence of a fight with members of the Heimwehr provoked by the attention paid by members of the group to local girls. In August 1933, an illegitimate daughter, Hildegard, was born to Jägerstätter and a local farm maidservant, Theresia Auer. Although some friends expressed doubts about Jägerstätter's paternity of the girl, he voluntarily paid money for her support and visited her often. Perhaps due to circumstances related to the girl's conception, Jägerstätter apparently underwent an "exile" around this time during which he was obliged to leave Sankt Radegund for several years, working in the iron mines of Eisenerz. In the social democratic working class environment he first experienced a crisis of meaning, but returned to his homeland as a deeply pious person.

=== Conversion ===
In the mid-1930s, Jägerstätter made a turn towards morality and piety that most of his neighbours recalled as "so sudden that people just couldn't understand it", "almost as if he had been possessed by a higher power", although others described it as more gradual. In 1934, Jägerstätter intended to enter a monastery, but the parish priest advised him against it.

On 9 April 1936, Maundy Thursday, Jägerstätter married Franziska Schwaninger (4 March 1913 – 16 March 2013), a deeply religious woman. After the wedding liturgy, the couple went on a pilgrimage to Rome, where they received a blessing from Pope Pius XI. Most members of the community attributed Jägerstätter's conversion to his wife's influence or the sight of the pope, but other evidence indicates that his choice of a wife and decision to travel to Rome may have rather been influenced by a conversion that had already taken place; one friend recalled that he observed Jägerstätter had already become much more pious when he returned from the iron mines in late 1934 or 1935. The marriage resulted in three daughters: Rosalia (b. 1 September 1937), Maria (b. 4 September 1938), and Aloisia (b. 5 May 1940).

When German troops moved into Austria in March 1938, Jägerstätter rejected the offered position as Radegund mayor. He was the only person in the village to vote against the Anschluss in the plebiscite of 10 April; nevertheless, the local authorities suppressed his dissent and announced unanimous approval. He was dismayed to witness many Catholics in his town supporting the Nazis, writing, "I believe there could scarcely be a sadder hour for the true Christian faith in our country". Although he was not involved with any political organization and underwent a brief period of military training, he remained openly anti-Nazi. He avoided any contact with the NSDAP, nor did he seek the help of local representatives to avoid being drafted into the Wehrmacht.

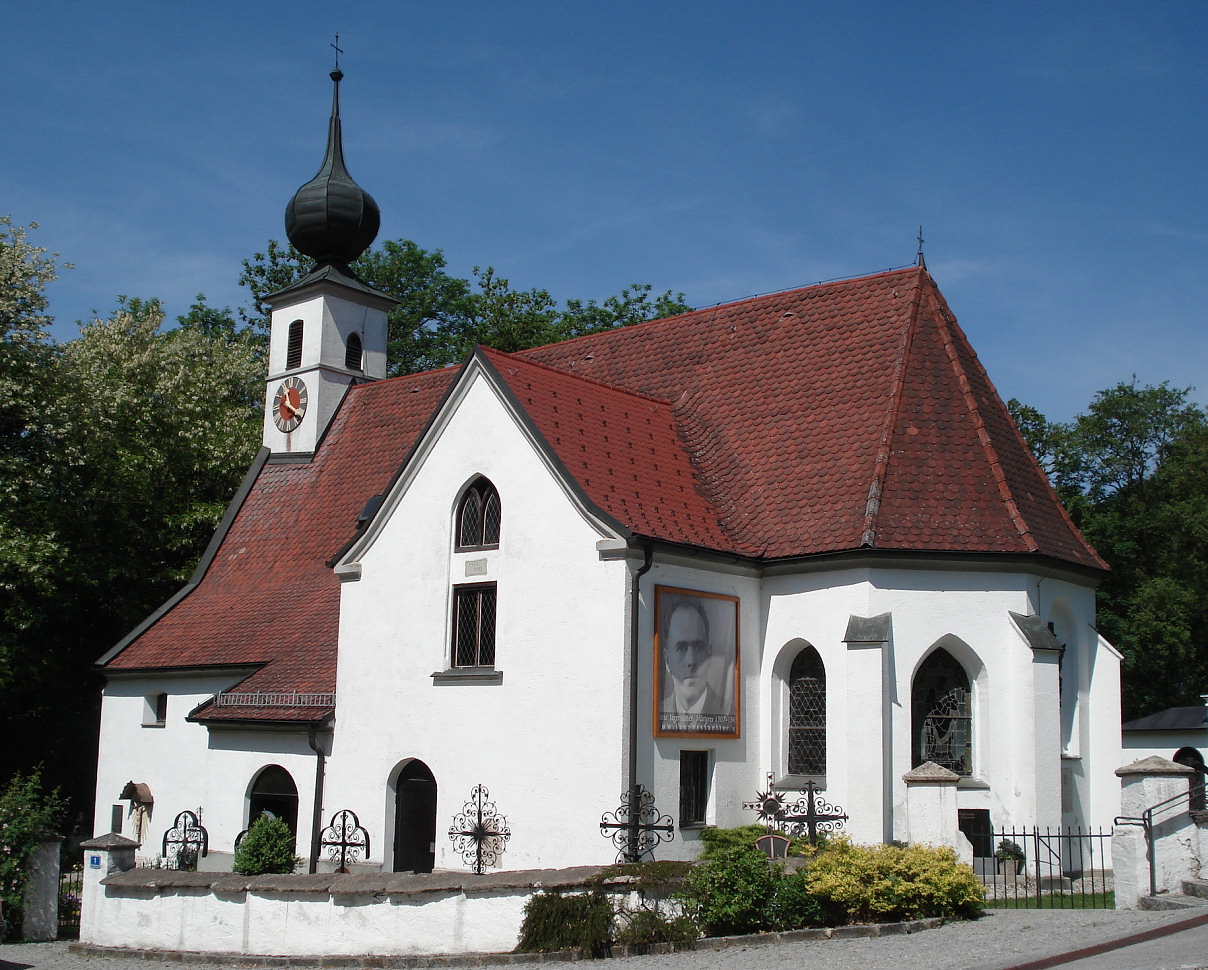
The St. Radegund Parish Church, where Jägerstätter was a sacristan

On 8 December 1940, the Solemnity of the Immaculate Conception, he joined the Third Order of Saint Francis. In summer 1940, the local parish priest, Josef Karobath (1898‍–‍1983), offered him work as a sacristan, as Jägerstätter attended Mass daily anyway. He was therefore deferred from military service four times.

Drafted for the first time on 17 June 1940, Jägerstätter, aged 33, was again conscripted into the German Wehrmacht in October and completed his training at the Enns garrison. He refused to take the Hitler oath, but could return home in 1941 under an exemption as a farmer.

Faced with his experiences in military service, the suppression of the church, as well as reports on the Nazi T4 euthanasia program, he began to examine the morality of the war. He travelled to Linz together with Franziska to discuss this with his bishop, Josephus Calasanz Fließer. Among Jägerstätter's writings are three copies of a list of "Ten Questions" expressing his concerns about the evil of cooperation with the Nazis, which, despite its heading reading "Who can and will answer these ten questions for me?", consists in one draft of eleven questions. A reference in this text to "five years" of Nazi rule in Austria implies the questions were composed in the winter of 1943, probably in preparation for the meeting with Fließer. Jägerstätter's questions were:

1. Who will give us the guarantee that it is not the slightest bit sinful to belong to a party that aims to eradicate the Christian faith?
2. When has the magisterium of the Church given its approval for someone to do and obey everything the N.S. Party or government commands or desires us to do?
3. If everything is found to be right and good that is done by someone who belongs to the N.S. Volk community—such as collecting money for it and contributing to it—then must it not be that everything that does not conform to this Volk community's wishes must be declared evil and unjust? Both ways cannot be good.
4. What kind of Catholic would venture to declare that these military campaigns of plundering, which Germany has undertaken in many lands and is still leading, constitute a just and holy war?
5. Who would venture to maintain that only one individual [i.e., Hitler] of the German-speaking people bears responsibility in this war? And if only one individual is responsible, why then did so many millions of German-speaking people still have to vote "yes" or "no"?
6. Since when are deceived people who are dying without repentance and without amending their committed sins and failures—which they were deceived into committing—allowed to enter heaven?
7. Why do we celebrate fighters for Nazism as heroes even in the churches of Austria? Didn't we still utterly d[amn] such people only five years ago?
8. If we can declare the German-speaking soldiers, who have relinquished their lives in the fight for the N.S. victory, to be heroes and saints, how much more highly should we regard the soldiers in the other lands who were intent on defending their homelands after they were suddenly attacked by German-speaking soldiers? Can we still regard this war as a punishment from God, or wouldn't it be better to pray that the war should continue until the end of the world than to pray that it should end soon, since it's producing so many heroes and saints?
9. How can we still educate our children to become true Catholics today when we are supposed to teach them that some activities that previously were seriously sinful are now good or at least not sinful?
10. Why should we now regard as just and good those activities that the masses are undertaking? How can people successfully get to the other river bank when they are defenselessly pulled along by the stream?
11. Who can succeed in simultaneously being a soldier of Christ and also a soldier for National Socialism, in simultaneously fighting for the victory of Christ and his church and also fighting for the victory of National Socialism?

Jägerstätter was kept waiting in an outer office for a very long time before he could see Bishop Fließer, which he thought to be due to suspicion that he was a Gestapo agent. A 1946 letter by the editor of the diocesan newspaper regarding the non-publication of an article about Jägerstätter gives an account of Fließer's words: "I saw that the man was thirsty for martyrdom and for suffering in atonement, and I told him he could only walk that path if he was sure that he was being called to do so by an extraordinary summons from above, not just from within himself. He affirmed this." Fließer recounted, "he spent more than an hour with me before his scheduled induction. In vain, I explained to him the basic principles of morality concerning the degree of responsibility which a private person and citizen bears for the actions of those in authority, and reminded him of his far higher responsibility for those within his private circle, particularly his family." Franziska Jägerstätter recalled that the meeting lasted about half an hour, and when he came out, "he was very sad, and said to me: 'they don't dare themselves, or it'll be their turn next.'"

=== Arrest and death ===
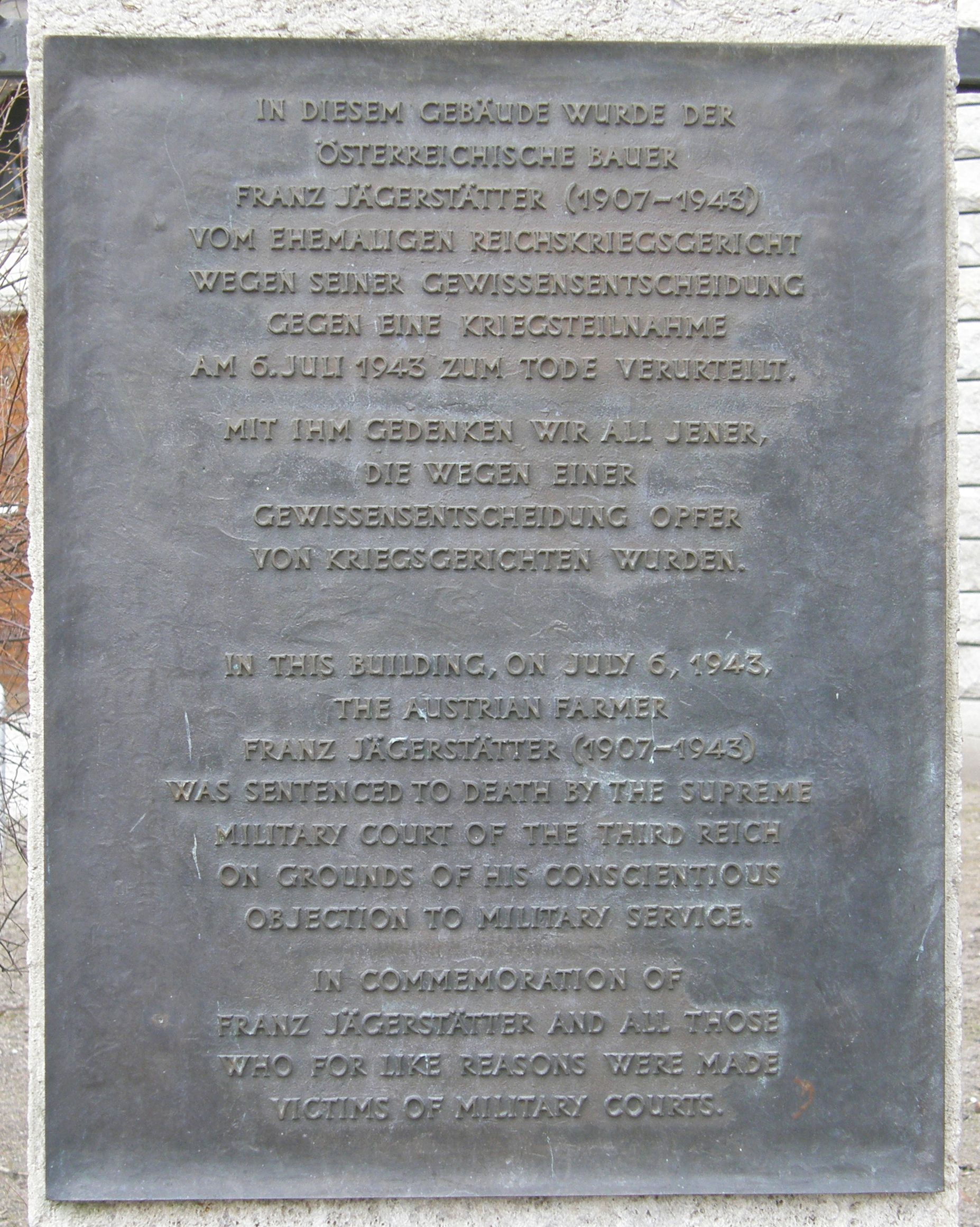
Memorial plaque for Jägerstätter and all those who for like reasons were made victims of military courts at the former Reichskriegsgericht in Berlin

After many delays, Jägerstätter was again called to active duty in February 1943. By this time, he had three daughters with his wife, the eldest not quite six. He maintained his position against fighting for Nazi Germany and, upon entering into the Wehrmacht garrison in Enns on the evening of 1 March, declared on 2 March his conscientious objection. His offer to carry out non-violent services was ignored. He was immediately arrested, repeatedly interrogated, and placed in custody, first at the Linz remand prison, then from 4 May at Tegel Prison in Berlin. From the prison he wrote: "Is it not more Christian to offer oneself as a victim right away rather than first have to murder others who certainly have a right to live and want to live — just to prolong one’s own life a little while?"

Accused of Wehrkraftzersetzung ("undermining military morale"), Jägerstätter was sentenced to death "and loss of military dignity and civil rights" in a military trial at the Reichskriegsgericht in Charlottenburg on 6 July 1943. His wife and his parish priest visited him a few days later in jail and tried to talk him into serving, but did not succeed. When Jägerstatter was told of the fate of the Austrian Pallottine father Franz Reinisch, who had been executed for his refusal to take the Hitler oath, his conscience was calmed. Jägerstätter expressed that it would be better for his daughters to see their father as a martyr rather than as a Nazi collaborator.

He was deported to Brandenburg-Görden Prison on 9 August, where he was executed by guillotine that afternoon, at age 36. Minutes before his execution, he was given the option to sign a document to save his life and declined, abjuring any complicity with the Nazi regime. Jägerstätter's last recorded words before his death were, "I am completely bound in inner union with the Lord".

Jägerstätters's remains were cremated in the city of Brandenburg. Austrian school sisters who worked there were able to take possession of the urn and bring it to Upper Austria after the end of the war. In 1946, the urn was buried at the Sankt Radegund cemetery.

== Legacy and beatification ==
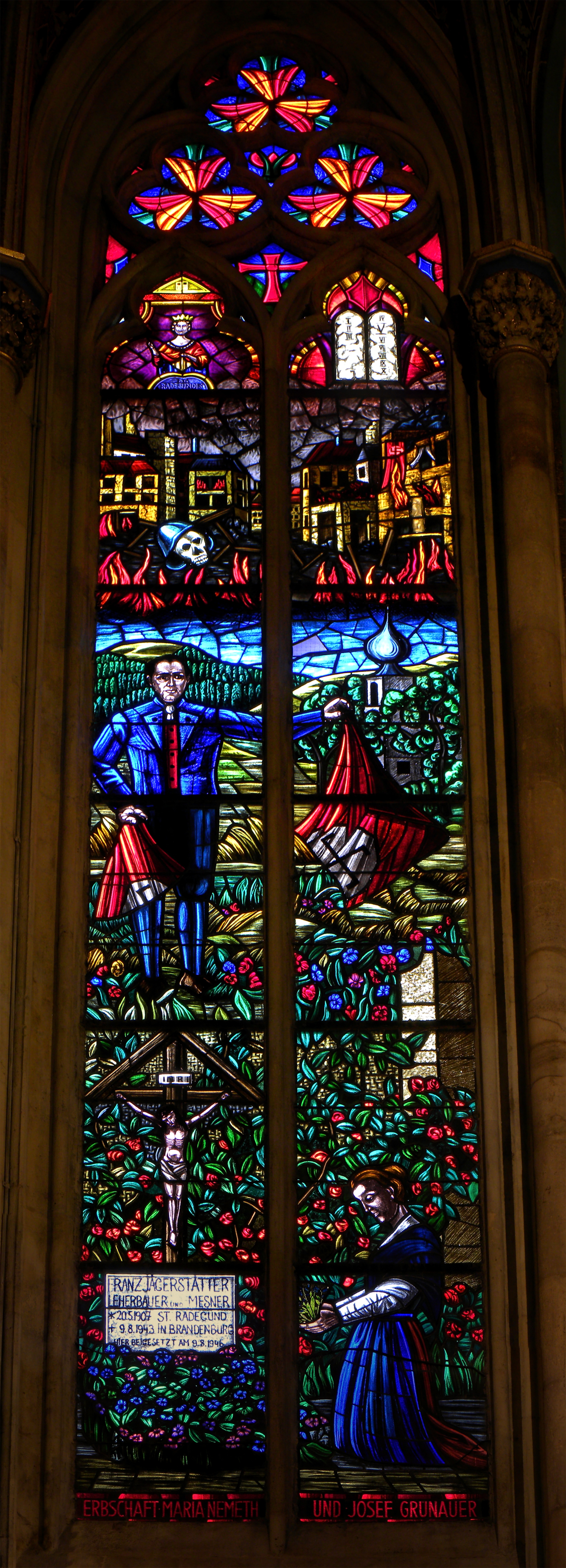
Stained glass window showing stations of Jägerstätter's life in the Votivkirche, Vienna

Jägerstätter was criticized by his countrymen, especially by those who had served in the military, for failing in his duty as a husband and father. The municipality of Sankt Radegund at first refused to put his name on the local war memorial and a pension for his widow was not approved until 1950.

Jägerstätter's fate was not well known until 1964, when US sociologist Gordon Zahn published his biography, In Solitary Witness: The Life and Death of Franz Jägerstätter. Thomas Merton, Trappist monk and peace activist, included a chapter about Jägerstätter in his book Faith and Violence of 1968. A 1971 film treatment of his life made for Austrian television, Verweigerung ("The Refusal") (originally titled Der Fall Jägerstätter), by director Axel Corti, starred Kurt Weinzierl. A bronze plaque with his quotation about conscientious objection was dedicated at the Pacifist Memorial in Sherborn, Massachusetts, in 1994. His case was a topic of the annual Braunauer Zeitgeschichte-Tage conference in 1995. The death sentence was nullified by the Landgericht Berlin on 7 May 1997. A Stolperstein for Jägerstätter in Sankt Radegund was laid in 2006.

The beatification process was opened in 1994. In June 2007, Pope Benedict XVI issued an apostolic exhortation declaring Jägerstätter a martyr. The Austrian bishops had described Jägerstätter as a "shining example in dark times". On 26 October 2007, Jägerstätter was beatified in a ceremony held by Cardinal José Saraiva Martins at the Cathedral of the Immaculate Conception in Linz. The beatification was attended by sixty members of Jägerstätter's family, including his widow and their children, grandchildren, and great-grandchildren. His feast day is the day of his baptism, 21 May. In 2016, Jägerstätter's relics were embedded in the altar of the parish church of St. Radegund, and he is regarded co-patron of this church, which makes his feast day a solemnity.

The documentary Franz Jaegerstaetter: A Man of Conscience was released in 2011. A film about Jägerstätter, A Hidden Life, written and directed by Terrence Malick, premiered in May 2019 at the 72nd Cannes Film Festival, and was given a general release in the US on 13 December 2019. The film is inspired by the book Franz Jägerstätter: Letters and Writings from Prison, edited by biographer Erna Putz, with Malick acquiring its adaptation rights for the production.

== Bibliography ==
- Zahn, Gordon (1986) [1964]. In Solitary Witness. The life and death of Franz Jägerstätter (Revised ed.). Springfield, Illinois: Templegate Publishers. ISBN 0-87243-141-X.
- Putz, Erna (2007). Franz Jägerstätter – Martyr: A Shining Example in Dark Times. Translated by Catherine Laura Danner. Grünbach, Upper Austria: Buchverlag Franz Steinmaßl. ISBN 978-3902427410.
- Andreas Maislinger, Franz Jägerstätter. In: Conquering the Past. Austrian Nazism Yesterday & Today, edited by Fred Parkinson. Wayne State University Press, Detroit 1989.
- Andreas Maislinger, Franz Jägerstätter and Leopold Engleitner. In: Bernhard Rammerstorfer, Unbroken Will. The Extraordinary Courage of an Ordinary Man. The Story of Leopold Engleitner. Grammaton Press. New Orleans 2004. ISBN 0-9679366-4-0
- Jägerstätter, Franz (2009). Putz, Erna (ed.). Franz Jägerstätter: Letters and Writings from Prison. Translated by Robert Anthony Krieg. Maryknoll, New York: Orbis Books. ISBN 978-1-57075-826-3. OCLC 295046320.
- Lorber, Verena. Thomas Schlager-Weidinger, and Andreas Schmoller, Eds. Franz Jägerstätter. Life and Memory. Linz: Wagner, 2023 (Christian and Martyr), ISBN 978-903040-70-0.
- Bergman, Roger. Preventing Unjust War: A Catholic Argument for Selective Conscientious Objection. Eugene, OR 2020.
