= Erna Putz =

Austrian theologian and writer

- Born: May 3, 1946 (age 78); Ohlsdorf, Austria
- Occupation(s): Theologian, author
- Theological work
- Main interests: Franz Jägerstätter's life and writings, conscientious objection

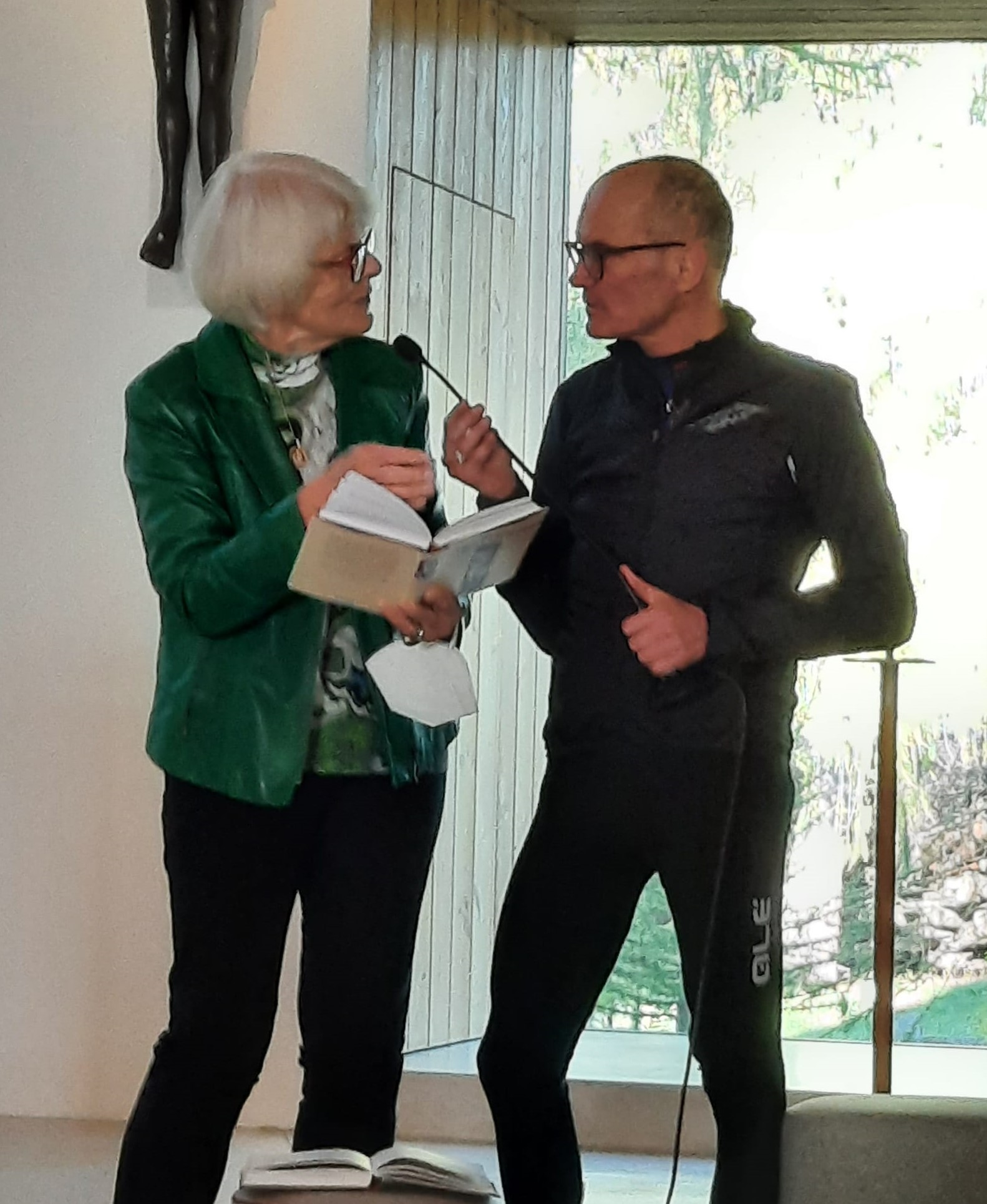
Erna Putz presenting a book at the Lichtenstern chapel in South Tyrol as interviewed by Hannes Obermair

Erna Putz (born 3 May 1946) is an Austrian theologian and author who wrote and edited books on conscientious objector and martyr Franz Jägerstätter, determined to promote his faithful life to the public since 1979. The film A Hidden Life was influenced by her book Franz Jägerstätter: Letters and Writings from Prison.

== Early life ==
Putz grew up in Ohlsdorf, Austria.

== Bibliography ==
- Putz, Erna (1985). Franz Jägerstätter „… besser die Hände als der Wille gefesselt…“ (in German). Linz: Veritas-Verlag. (ISBN 978-3853295014)
- Putz, Erna (1987). Gefängnisbriefe und Aufzeichnungen. Franz Jägerstätter verweigert 1943 den Wehrdienst. (in German). Linz: Veritas-Verlag. (ISBN 978-3853295786)
- Putz, Erna (1996). Against the Stream: Franz Jägerstätter -The Man Who Refused to Fight for Hitler. London: Pax Christi, Anglican Pacifist Fellowship. (ISBN 978-1872370255)
- Putz, Erna (2007). Franz Jägerstätter - Märtyrer: Leuchtendes Beispiel in dunkler Zeit [Franz Jägerstätter - Martyr: A Shining Example in Dark Times] (in German). Grünbach: Steinmassl, Franz. (ISBN 978-3902427397)
- Jägerstätter, Franz (2007). Putz, Erna (ed.). Franz Jägerstätter: Der gesamte Briefwechsel mit Franziska. Aufzeichnungen 1941-1943 (in German). Vienna: Styria Premium. (ISBN 978-3222132322)
- Putz, Erna; Schlager-Weidinger, Thomas (eds.) (2008). Liebe Franziska! Lieber Franz! Junge Briefe an die Jägerstätters (in German). Linz: Wagner Verlag. (ISBN 978-3902330307}
- Jägerstätter, Franz (2009). Putz, Erna (ed.). Franz Jägerstätter: Letters and Writings from Prison. Maryknoll, NY: Orbis Books. (ISBN 978-1570758263)
