= Florida Film Critics Circle Awards 2019 =

Annual US film awards ceremony

24th FFCC Awards

December 23, 2019

Best Picture:
Portrait of a Lady on Fire

The 24th Florida Film Critics Circle Awards were held on December 23, 2019.

The nominations were announced on December 19, 2019, led by Marriage Story with seven nominations.

== Winners and nominees ==
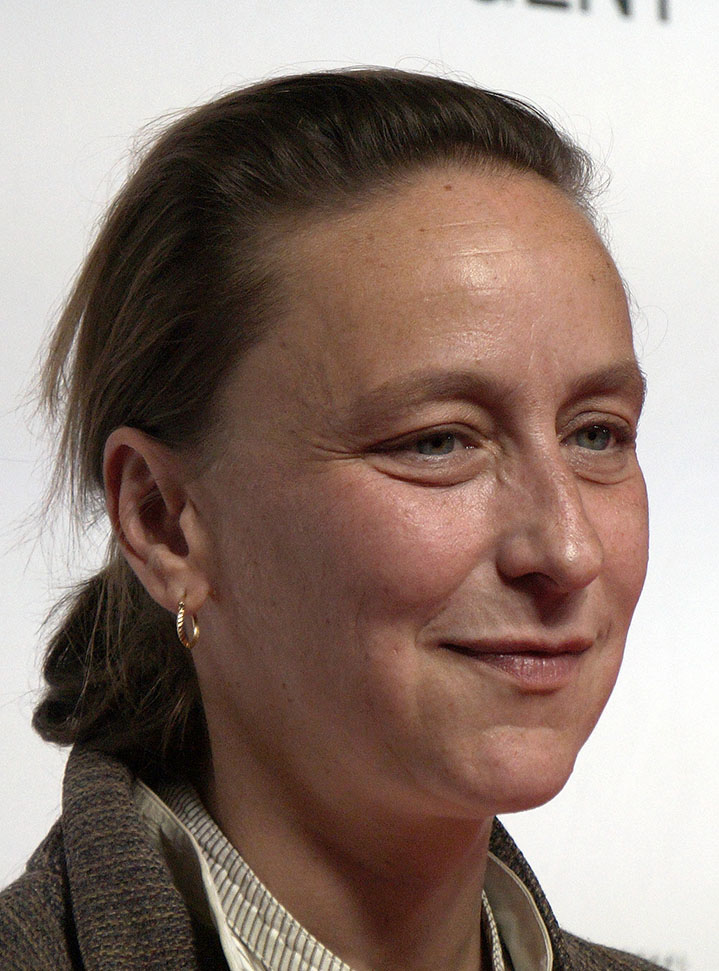
Céline Sciamma, Best Director winner

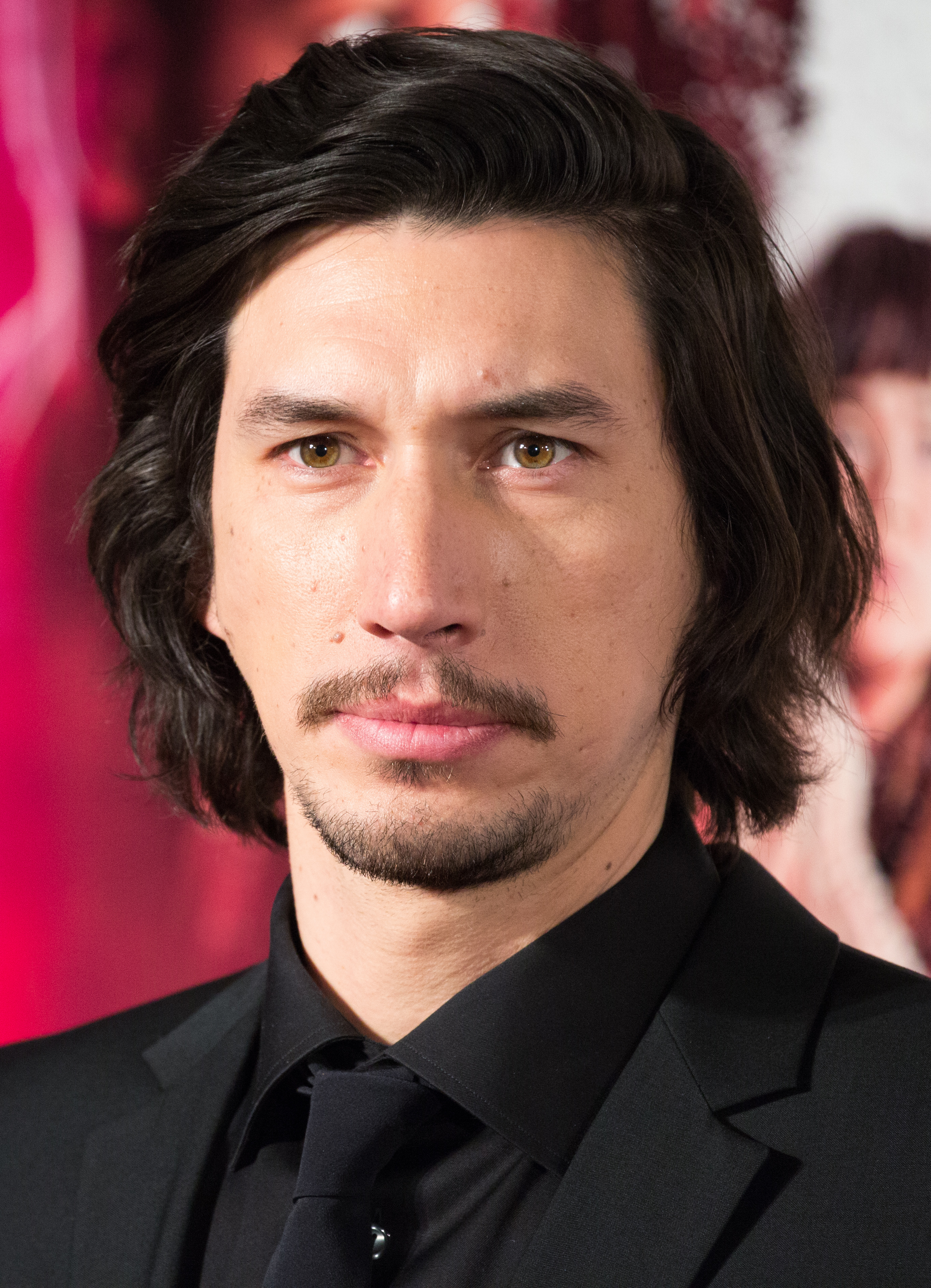
Adam Driver, Best Actor winner

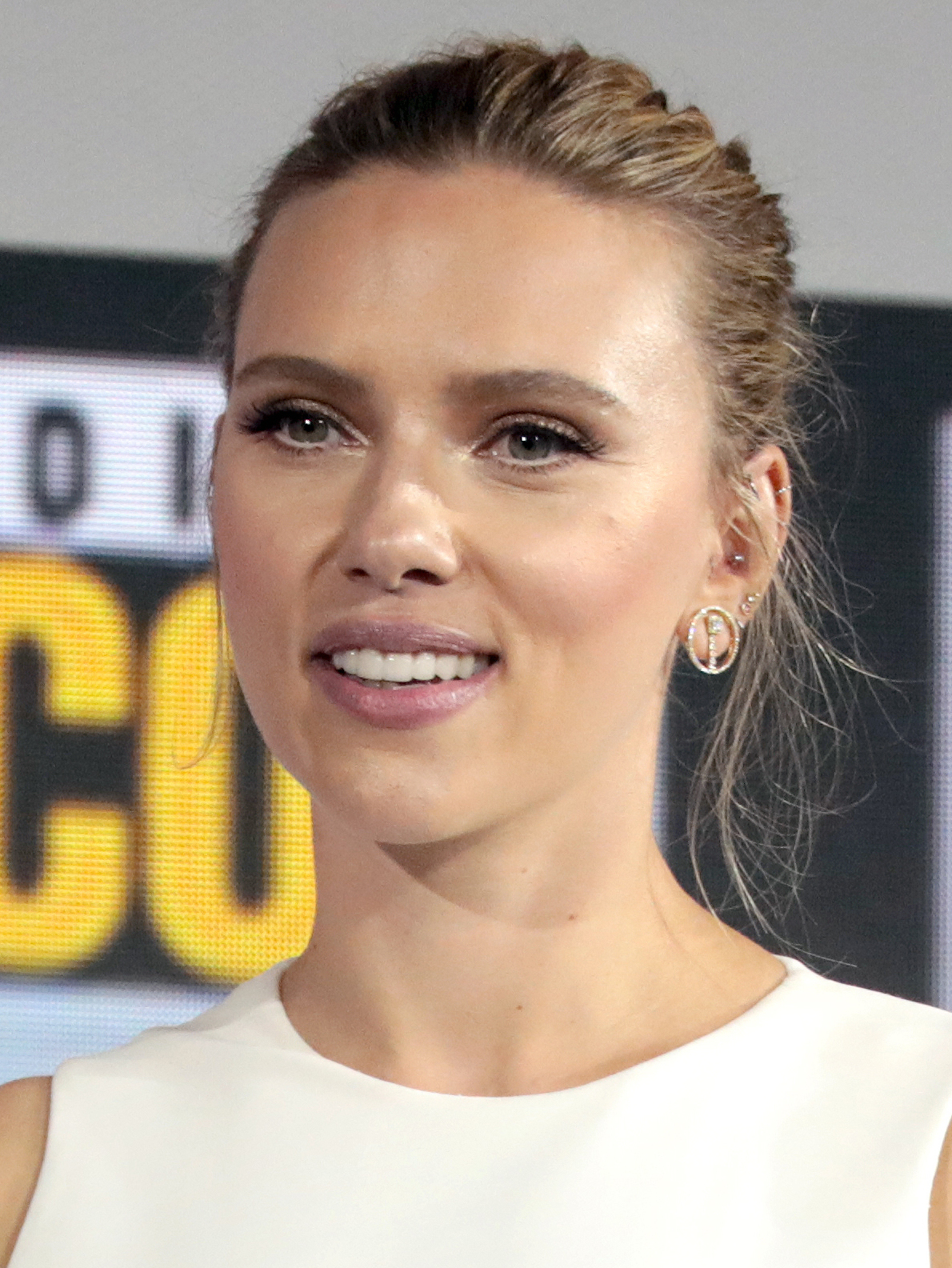
Scarlett Johansson, Best Actress winner

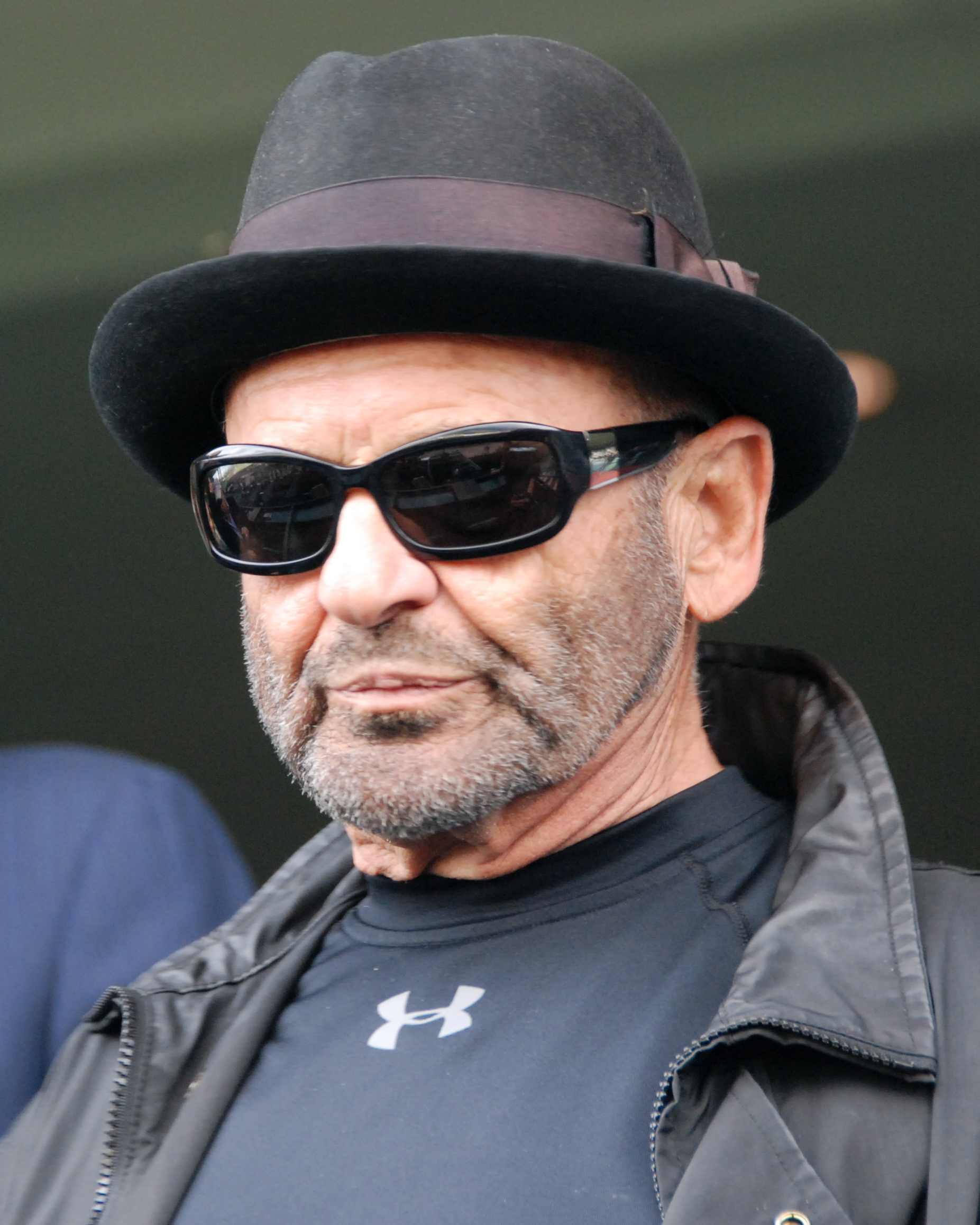
Joe Pesci, Best Supporting Actor winner

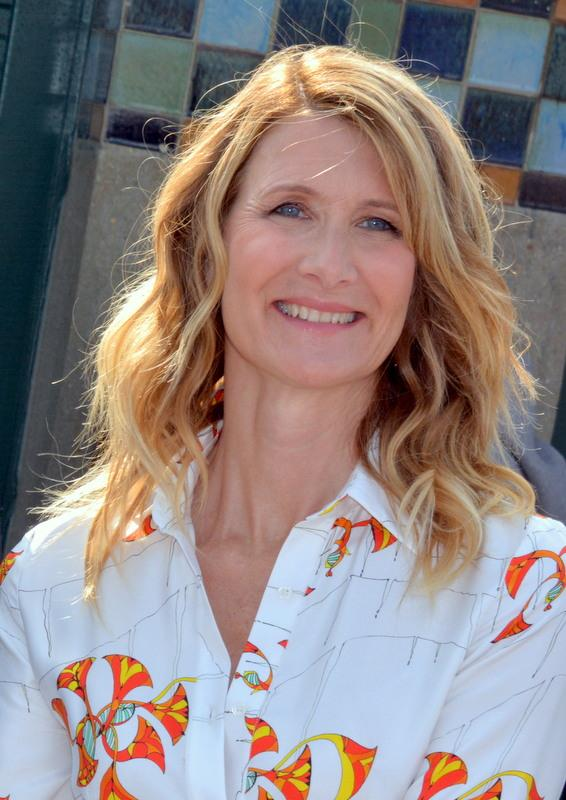
Laura Dern, Best Supporting Actress winner

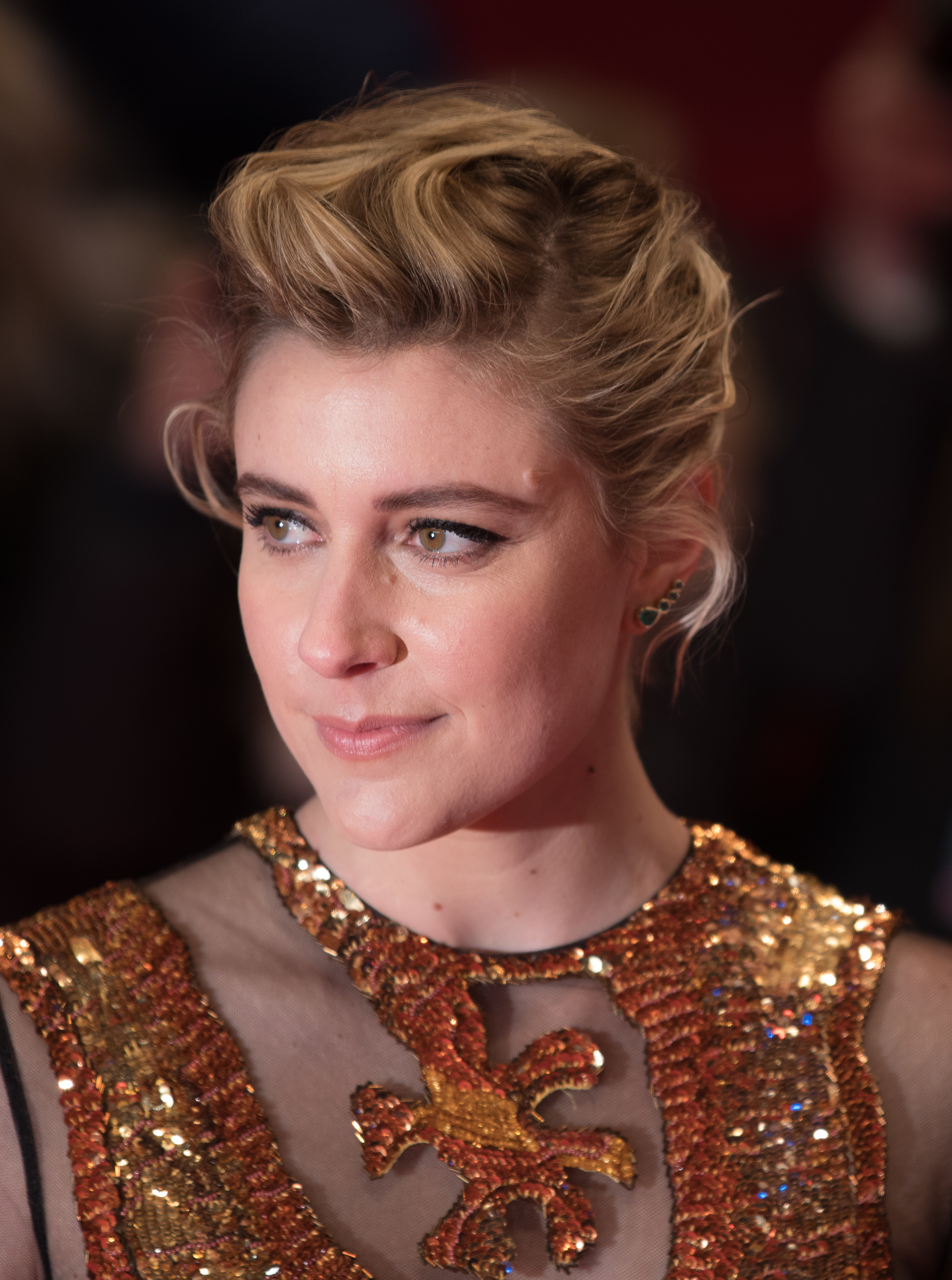
Greta Gerwig, Best Adapted Screenplay winner

Winners are listed at the top of each list in bold, while the runner-ups for each category are listed under them.

Best Film	Best Director
**Portrait of a Lady on Fire**: Runner-up: 1917; Ad Astra; The Irishman; Marriage Story	**Céline Sciamma – Portrait of a Lady on Fire**: Runner-up: Sam Mendes – 1917; Greta Gerwig – Little Women
Best Actor	Best Actress
**Adam Driver – Marriage Story as Charlie Barber**: Runner-up: Antonio Banderas – Pain and Glory as Salvador Mallo; Taron Egerton – Rocketman as Elton John; Joaquin Phoenix – Joker as Arthur Fleck / Joker; Franz Rogowski – Transit as Georg; Adam Sandler – Uncut Gems as Howard Ratner	**Scarlett Johansson – Marriage Story as Nicole Barber**: Runner-up: Florence Pugh – Midsommar as Dani Ardor; Elisabeth Moss – Her Smell as Becky Something; Charlize Theron – Bombshell as Megyn Kelly; Renée Zellweger – Judy as Judy Garland
Best Supporting Actor	Best Supporting Actress
**Joe Pesci – The Irishman as Russell Bufalino**: Runner-up: John Lithgow – Bombshell as Roger Ailes; Tom Hanks – A Beautiful Day in the Neighborhood as Fred Rogers; Anthony Hopkins – The Two Popes as Pope Benedict XVI; Brad Pitt – Once Upon a Time in Hollywood as Cliff Booth	**Laura Dern – Marriage Story as Nora Fanshaw**: Runner-up: Isla Fisher – The Beach Bum as Minnie; Runner-up: Margot Robbie – Bombshell as Kayla Pospisil; Annette Bening – The Report as Dianne Feinstein; Scarlett Johansson – Jojo Rabbit as Rosie Beltzer; Jennifer Lopez – Hustlers as Ramona Vega; Zhao Shuzhen – The Farewell as Nai Nai
Best Adapted Screenplay	Best Original Screenplay
**Greta Gerwig – Little Women**: Runner-up: Steven Zaillian – The Irishman; Micah Fitzerman-Blue and Noah Harpster – A Beautiful Day in the Neighborhood; Terrence Malick – A Hidden Life; Anthony McCarten – The Two Popes; Taika Waititi – Jojo Rabbit	**Ronald Bronstein, Benny Safdie, and Josh Safdie – Uncut Gems**: Runner-up: Lulu Wang – The Farewell; Noah Baumbach – Marriage Story; Bong Joon-ho and Han Jin-won – Parasite; Céline Sciamma – Portrait of a Lady on Fire; Quentin Tarantino – Once Upon a Time in Hollywood
Best Animated Film	Best Documentary Film
**I Lost My Body**: Runner-up: Toy Story 4; Frozen 2; How to Train Your Dragon: The Hidden World; Weathering with You	**Apollo 11**: Runner-up: Honeyland; American Factory; The Biggest Little Farm
Best Foreign Language Film	Best Ensemble
**Portrait of a Lady on Fire**: Runner-up: Parasite; The Farewell; Long Day's Journey into Night; Pain and Glory	**Little Women**: Runner-up: The Farewell; The Irishman; Marriage Story; Parasite
Best Art Direction / Production Design	Best Cinematography
**Barbara Ling – Once Upon a Time in Hollywood**: Runner-up: Kevin Constant, Christa Munro, Alison Sadler, David Scott, and Gary Warshaw – Ad Astra; Dennis Gassner and Lee Sandales – 1917	**Roger Deakins – 1917**: Runner-up: Claire Mathon – Portrait of a Lady on Fire; Hoyte van Hoytema – Ad Astra; Jörg Widmer – A Hidden Life
Best Score	Best Visual Effects
**Daniel Lopatin – Uncut Gems**: Hildur Guðnadóttir – Joker; Randy Newman – Marriage Story; Thomas Newman – 1917; Max Richter – Ad Astra	**Alita: Battle Angel**: Runner-up: Ad Astra; Runner-up: Avengers: Endgame
Best First Film	Pauline Kael Breakout Award
**Queen & Slim**: Runner-up: Honeyland; Booksmart; The Last Black Man in San Francisco	**Florence Pugh – Midsommar, Fighting with My Family, and Little Women as Dani Ardor, Saraya Knight / Paige, and Amy March**: Runner-up: Lulu Wang – The Farewell; Honor Swinton Byrne – The Souvenir as Julie; Roman Griffin Davis – Jojo Rabbit as Johannes "Jojo" Beltzer
Jay Boyar Golden Orange Award
**Tampa Theatre**
