= Gordon Zahn =

Peace activist

- Born: Gordon Charles Paul Roach; August 7, 1918; Milwaukee, Wisconsin, US
- Died: December 9, 2007 (aged 89); Wauwatosa, Wisconsin, US
- Known for: Peace activist
- Title: professor emeritus University of Massachusetts Boston

Gordon Zahn (born Gordon Charles Paul Roach; August 7, 1918 – December 9, 2007) was an American sociologist, pacifist, professor, and author.

== Early life ==
Born out of wedlock, Zahn took his stepfather's last name. During World War II, he was a conscientious objector, and served in a Civilian Public Service camp established by the Catholic Worker Movement. Zahn later transferred to Rosewood State Training School in Maryland, a school for the developmentally disabled. He worked there as a conscientious objector until April 1946. His experiences at Rosewood were published in the Catholic Worker in the July and October 1946 issues, as a continuation of his attempt to reform Rosewood.

== Education and career ==
In 1946 Zahn and a friend went to Saint John's University in Collegeville, Minnesota. There they met Eugene McCarthy, who hired them when he became a U.S. Senator. Zahn received a PhD from The Catholic University of America and then a job at Loyola University Chicago. Cardinal Augustin Bea unsuccessfully pressured both Loyola and a German publisher to stop Zahn's book German Catholics and Hitler's Wars. Zahn was later hired away by the University of Massachusetts Amherst.

== Second Vatican Council ==
Zahn was important in the debate over warfare in the Second Vatican Council, specifically Schema 13. Through Richard Carbray and archbishop Thomas Roberts, Zahn was introduced to abbot Cuthbert Butler, OSB. Zahn gave talks on Franz Jägerstätter and wrote a speech for Butler, which he delivered to the Council. Gallagher implies this all led to Schema 13 supporting conscientious objectors and denouncing weapons of mass destruction.

== Authored works ==
Zahn was the author of several books and articles, often focusing on the topics of conscience and war. He wrote Military Chaplains, based on interviews he did with RAF Chaplains who had served in the war. He then wrote German Catholics and Hitler's Wars, in which he argued priests had aided Hitler by telling Germans it was their religious duty to fight.

He later wrote In Solitary Witness: The Life and Death of Franz Jägerstätter, about the Austrian farmer and conscientious objector who refused to swear an oath to Hitler and to fight in his army. Zahn first heard of Jägerstätter in 1956, while doing research for German Catholics and Hitler's Wars. He was impressed and inspired by Jägerstätter's story and felt that it deserved a wider audience: “it was enough to convince me that this was indeed an amazing story, one deserving the widest possible attention".

== Other work ==
He was also the co-founder of Pax Christi USA.

In 1968, he signed the "Writers and Editors War Tax Protest" pledge, vowing to refuse tax payments in protest against the Vietnam War.

In 1982 he received the Pax Christi award from St John's.

== Books ==
- Zahn, Gordon. German Catholics and Hitler's Wars: A Study in Social Control 1964. ISBN 9780268010171
- Zahn, Gordon. In Solitary Witness: The Life and Death of Franz Jägerstätter 1964. ISBN 0-87243-141-X
- Zahn, Gordon. What is Society? 1964 Hawthorn Books.
- Zahn, Gordon. Another Part of the War: The Camp Simon Story 1979 ISBN 0-87023-259-2
