= Franz Reinisch =

Austrian Catholic priest (1903–1942)

Servant of God Franz Reinisch SAC
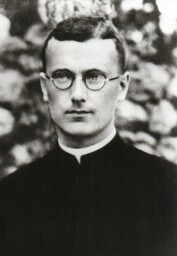
- Born: 1 February 1903; Feldkirch, Austria
- Died: 21 August 1942 (aged 39)
- Cause of death: Execution by guillotine
- Influenced: Franz Jägerstätter

Franz Reinisch, SAC (1 February 1903 – 21 August 1942) was an Austrian Catholic priest of the Society of the Catholic Apostolate who refused to take the so-called Hitler Oath, for which he was executed.

== Life ==
=== Early life ===
Franz Reinisch was born on 1 February 1903 in Feldkirch, Austria, and baptised the next day. At the baptism his parents dedicated him to the Virgin Mary. Reinisch grew up with two brothers and two sisters. His father, Franz Reinisch, a finance official, moved often while Reinisch was a child. The family of Feldkirch moved to Bolzano, Bruneck and finally to Innsbruck. During his time in Bolzano, Reinisch survived a serious illness.

From the autumn of 1914 Franz Reinisch and his brother visited Andreas Gymnasium of the Franciscans in Tyrol. In 1919, the brothers looked for a flat together in order to be more independent. Reinisch, who later recalled this time fondly, performed well in school.

=== Studies ===
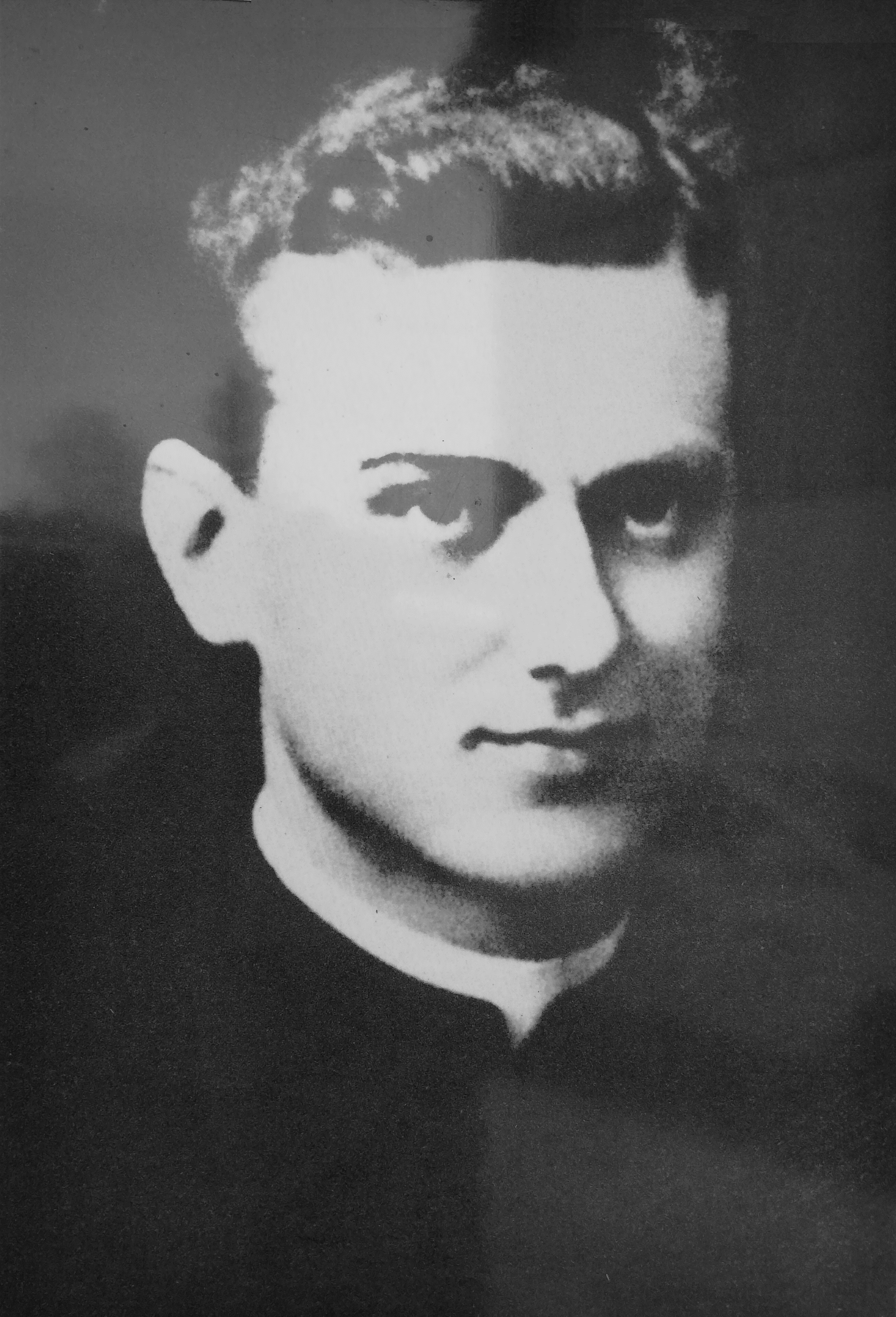
Franz Reinisch

Franz Reinisch began to study law on 28 September 1922 at the Leopold-Franzens University in Innsbruck. His motto for this time, derived from the motto of his fraternity K.Ö.HV Leopoldina was "immovable as the mountains of home, our faith is in Jesus Christ and Mary". A year later he studied in the coroner's office of Kiel, where he was temporarily a member of the AV-Rheno Guestfalia Kiel. During this time he participated in a four-week retreat. Through his experiences in the port city he decided to become a priest. In Innsbruck he began in autumn of 1923, the study of theology and philosophy. At the age of 22, Reinisch entered the seminary of Brixen. Here he first had contact with the Pallottines and engaged in a close friendship with priest Richard Weickgenannt SAC. Through him he joined the Schoenstatt Apostolic Movement. During Advent, he took part in a pilgrimage to Rome. The highlight of this pilgrimage was a papal audience with Pope Pius XI on Christmas Eve 1926.

Two years later, on 29 June 1928, Reinisch was ordained a priest in Innsbruck Cathedral. In the same year on November 3, he entered the Pallottine convent Untermerzbach in Bamberg. After just three weeks in the novitiate, he planned to run away. Reinisch tried to escape over the wall of the novitiate one evening. However, when he passed the Lourdes grotto, he could not go on. He later said that it was as if someone held him. This evening was for him the key event of his education. In Salzburg, he finished his theological studies in the fall of 1932.

=== Time in Schoenstatt ===
In 1933 Franz Reinisch went to Augsburg. Here he was responsible for youth work and quickly showed his talent for preaching. Among the young people he found many enthusiastic listeners. Through a priestly magazine he first learned of Schoenstatt. Five years later, in 1938, after several transfers to Konstanz, Hohenrechberg, to the St. Paul Home in Bruchsal, Salzburg and Untermerzbach, he finally came to Schoenstatt. Here, Franz Reinisch was entrusted with mission work and men's ministry. He held here especially many retreats and conferences. From Schoenstatt he undertook many tours throughout Germany. Early on he began to confront the emerging ideology of National Socialism. His troubles with the law began when the Gestapo became aware of his speeches in which he openly addressed the incompatibility of Christianity with the ideas of the Nazi regime. For this reason he received a ban on sermons and speeches on 12 September 1940. Since he could not occupy a parish post, he could be drafted. He took up work for the church by translating ecclesiastical messages and texts from Italian into German magazines. He defied the ban and continued to attend speeches.

=== Decision of conscience ===
I, as a Christian and Austrian, can never take the oath of allegiance to a man like Hitler. There must be people who are protesting against the abuse of authority, and I feel called to this protest.

— Franz Reinisch

After the death of Reich President Paul von Hindenburg in August 1934, the military oath formula was changed. The Hitler Oath required conscripts were to swear an oath of allegiance and binding loyalty to Adolf Hitler. On 12 September 1941, Reinisch received the call-up to join the Wehrmacht. By this time he was convinced that Hitler was the personification of the Antichrist, and argued against taking the Hitler oath, even though refusing it would bring severe consequences. He often prayed before the image of Mary at the Shrine of Schoenstatt: "Dear Mother Thrice Admirable, let me live as an ardent Schoenstatt apostle and die!" On Easter Tuesday, 1942 he was ordered into the armed forces. During this time of prayer he resolved not to take the oath of allegiance. In a visit to Innsbruck, he told his parents of his decision.

On 15 April 1942, Reinisch arrived a day later than ordered in the barracks in Bad Kissingen and immediately declared his refusal to swear the oath of allegiance to Hitler. He publicly noted that he would swear allegiance to the German people but not Adolf Hitler. He was arrested and brought before a court martial, charged with undermining military morale. His trial dragged on, so he was brought in May to the Tegel Prison, where the chaplain denied him the holy communion for failing to perform his duty. In August he was moved to Brandenburg in Berlin, where he would be sentenced. In prison he wrote the poem You are the Great Sign, Full of Light as a dirge in anticipation of a death sentence.

On 20 August 1942, the death sentence was read aloud at 8 p.m. by the public prosecutor. Reinisch said, "This convict is not a revolutionary; a revolutionary is a head of state or a public enemy who fights with fists and violence. I am a Catholic priest with only the weapons of the Holy Spirit and the Faith; but I know what I am fighting for." Reinisch prayed that night then wrote a farewell letter to his parents and siblings. His final words from the prison cell were, "Love and suffering into joy, F. Reinisch". On 21 August 1942 he made his last confession at midnight. At 1 a.m., he received the holy communion. At 3 a.m., he gave all he had to his family, including a cloth in which the Eucharist was wrapped, his crucifix and rosary, some books and his farewell letter. At 3:30 his shoes and socks were taken off, his hands were tied behind his back, and he was led to the basement execution chamber where, at 5:03, he was beheaded by guillotine. His body was cremated and his ashes buried next to the Schoenstatt Shrine.

Reinisch's attitude encouraged Franz Jägerstätter in his decision to refuse military service, for which he was executed in 1943.

== Legacy ==
The beatification process of Franz Reinisch commenced in Trier on 28 May 2013 in the presence of the local bishop Stephan Ackermann and concluded on diocesan level on 28 June 2019. The postulator is Heribert Niederschlag SAC.

Since 1962, Reinisch is commemorated during a vigil on the night of 20 to 21 August. In St. Stephen's Cathedral, Passau he is honored in the memorial chapel.

A plaque attached to the Schwäbisch Gmünd cultural centre "Prediger Schwäbisch Gmünd" commemorates the local victims of National Socialism, among them Franz Reinisch. From 1938 on, Gestapo offices were established in the "Prediger".

In his native town of Feldkirch the Franz-Reinisch-Weg is named after him, and in Innsbruck/Wilten, a road plaque marks the Pater-Reinisch-Weg since 1983. Since 2001, the Pater-Franz-Reinisch-Brücke in the Vallendar township is named after him. In Germany in Friedberg, Bavaria, there is also a street named after him, and the Schönstatt Youth of the Archdiocese of Bamberg gave its house the name of Reinisch.

Bad Kissingen has remembered Reinisch with a memorial stone since 2001. There is also the Reinisch-Haus of the Apostolic Movement of Schoenstatt, which was named after him in 1979. The Pallotinians of St. Josef in Hersberg put up a memorial plaque to honour Reinisch.
