= Hitler Oath =

Oath sworn by members of the German armed forces and civil service from 1934

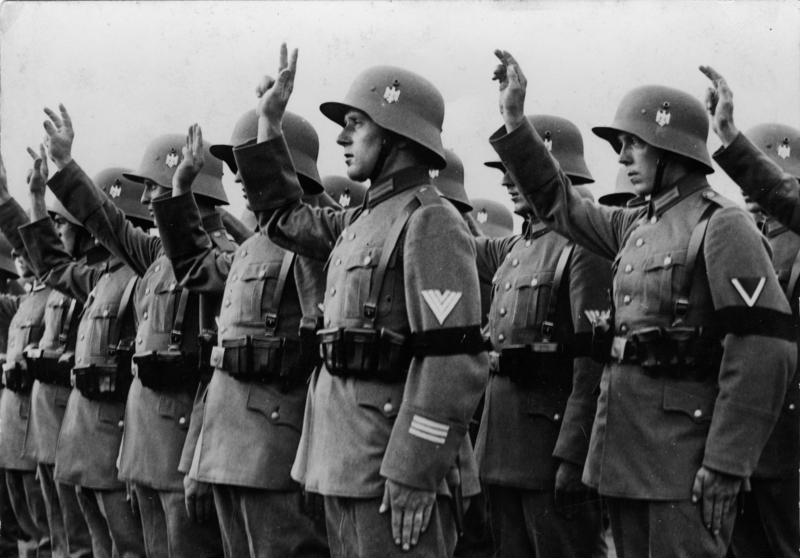
Reichswehr soldiers swearing the Hitler oath in 1934, with hands raised in the traditional Schwurhand gesture

The Hitler Oath (German: Führereid, 'Führer Oath'), also referred to in English—but not in German—as the Soldier's Oath, refers to the oaths of allegiance sworn by officers and soldiers of the Wehrmacht and civil servants of Germany between 1934 and 1945. The oath pledged loyalty to Adolf Hitler the person, rather than loyalty to the Weimar Constitution of the country. Historians view the personal oath of Nazi Germany as an important psychological element to obey orders for committing war crimes, atrocities, and genocide. During the Nuremberg trials, many German officers unsuccessfully attempted to use the oath as a defence against charges of war crimes and crimes against humanity.

== Background ==
During the Weimar era, the oath of allegiance, sworn by the Reichswehr, required soldiers to swear loyalty to the Reich Constitution and its lawful institutions. Following Hitler's appointment as Chancellor in 1933, the military oath changed, the troops now swearing loyalty to volk and fatherland. On the day of the death of President Paul von Hindenburg, the oath was changed again, as part of the Nazification of the country; it was no longer one of allegiance to the constitution or its institutions, but one of binding loyalty to Hitler himself.

Although the popular view is that Hitler drafted the oath himself and imposed it on the military, the oath was the initiative of Reichswehr Minister General Werner von Blomberg and General Walter von Reichenau, the chief of the Ministerial Office. The intention of Blomberg and Reichenau in having the military swear an oath to Hitler was to create a personal special bond between him and the military, which was intended to tie Hitler more tightly towards the military and away from the Nazi Party. Years later, Blomberg admitted that he did not think through the full implications of the oath at the time.

On 20 August 1934, the cabinet decreed the "Law On The Allegiance of Civil Servants and Soldiers of the Armed Forces", which superseded the original oaths. The new law decreed that both members of the armed forces and civil servants had to swear an oath of loyalty to Hitler personally.

== History ==
=== Previous oaths ===
==== Reichswehr oath ====
From 1919 until 1935, the Weimar Republic's armed forces were called the Reichswehr ('realm defence').

The original oath called the Reichswehreid came into effect on 14 August 1919, shortly after Reichspräsident Friedrich Ebert had signed the Weimar Constitution for the German Reich. The Treaty of Versailles limited the Reichswehr to a total of 100,000 men.

===== From 1919 to December 1933 =====
In January 1933, when Adolf Hitler was appointed Reichskanzler and the Enabling Act and Gleichschaltung came into effect, the military oath changed again.

===== From 2 December 1933 to 2 August 1934 =====
German original	Translated
Ich schwöre bei Gott diesen heiligen Eid, daß ich meinem Volk und Vaterland allzeit treu und redlich dienen und als tapferer und gehorsamer Soldat bereit sein will, jederzeit für diesen Eid mein Leben einzusetzen.	"I swear by God this holy oath, that I want to ever loyally and sincerely serve my volk and fatherland and be prepared as a brave and obedient soldier to risk my life for this oath at any time."

After the death of German President Paul von Hindenburg on 2 August 1934, Hitler merged the offices of Reichspräsident and Reichskanzler, and declared himself Führer and Reichskanzler. Blomberg issued a new wording of the oath which became known as the Führereid ('Führer oath'). From that point on, all military personnel swore an oath of allegiance and binding loyalty to Hitler himself.

=== Führer oath ===
==== Wehrmacht oath ====
On 16 March 1935 the German government renamed the Reichswehr as the Wehrmacht ('defence force').

German original	Translated
Ich schwöre bei Gott diesen heiligen Eid, daß ich dem Führer des Deutschen Reiches und Volkes; Adolf Hitler, dem Obersten Befehlshaber der Wehrmacht, unbedingten Gehorsam leisten und als tapferer Soldat bereit sein will, jederzeit für diesen Eid mein Leben einzusetzen.	"I swear by God this holy oath that I shall render unconditional obedience to the Führer of the German Reich and people, Adolf Hitler, supreme commander of the armed forces, and that as a brave soldier I shall at all times be prepared to give my life for this oath."

When the oath became law in July 1935, civilian officials would swear a similar oath.

==== Civil servant oath ====
Diensteid der öffentlichen Beamten

German original	Translated
Ich schwöre: Ich werde dem Führer des Deutschen Reiches und Volkes; Adolf Hitler treu und gehorsam sein, die Gesetze beachten, und meine Amtspflichten gewissenhaft erfüllen, so wahr mir Gott helfe.	"I swear: I will be faithful and obedient to the Führer of the German Reich and people, Adolf Hitler, to observe the law, and to conscientiously fulfil my official duties, so help me God!"

Oathtakers then sang the first stanza of the national anthem, followed by the Nazi anthem Horst-Wessel-Lied.

== Public figures who refused to take the oath ==
Thousands of military officers reportedly claimed to be ill to avoid taking the oath but were forced to do so after returning to duty.

Name	Background	Consequences
Karl Barth	Swiss theologian	Loss of professorship
Martin Gauger	Probationary judge as a state prosecutor in Wuppertal	Forced retirement of his position as a state prosecutor
Franz Jägerstätter	Austrian conscientious objector	Executed in 1943; beatified in 2007
Josef Mayr-Nusser	Italian Roman Catholic from Bozen, after call-up for duty in the Waffen-SS	Death penalty, died on the way to Dachau concentration camp
Joseph Ruf	"Brother Maurus" of the Christkönigsgesellschaft	Executed in October 1940
Franz Reinisch	Pallottines priest from Austria, after call-up for duty in the Wehrmacht	Executed by beheading in 1942; beatified in 2017

== See also ==
- Oaths to Hitler
- Ceremonial oath of the Bundeswehr
