= Josef Mayr-Nusser =

Italian Roman Catholic

Blessed Josef Mayr-Nusser
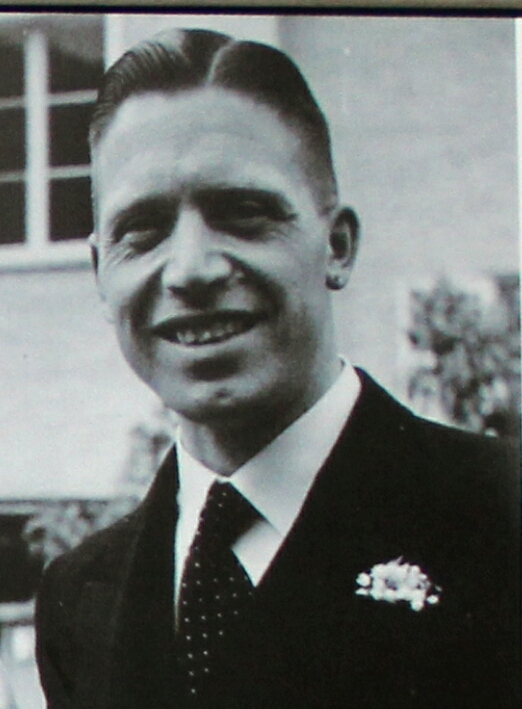

Martyr
- Born: 27 December 1910; Bozen, Austria
- Died: 24 February 1945 (aged 34); Erlangen, Germany
- Resting place: Chiesa di San Giuseppe, Bolzano, Italy
- Venerated in: Roman Catholic Church
- Beatified: 18 March 2017 by Cardinal Angelo Amato
- Feast: 3 October

Josef Mayr-Nusser (27 December 1910 – 24 February 1945) was an Italian Roman Catholic who served as the president of the Saint Vincent de Paul Conference of the Bolzano division as well as a member of Catholic Action. He is known best for refusing to recite the Hitler oath after he was drafted as a Nazi soldier and was sentenced to death at the Dachau concentration camp. He died en route to the camp in 1945. He is known as the "Martyr of the First Commandment".

Mayr-Nusser was hailed for living his life according to the tenets of the Gospel and of Vincent de Paul.

== Life ==
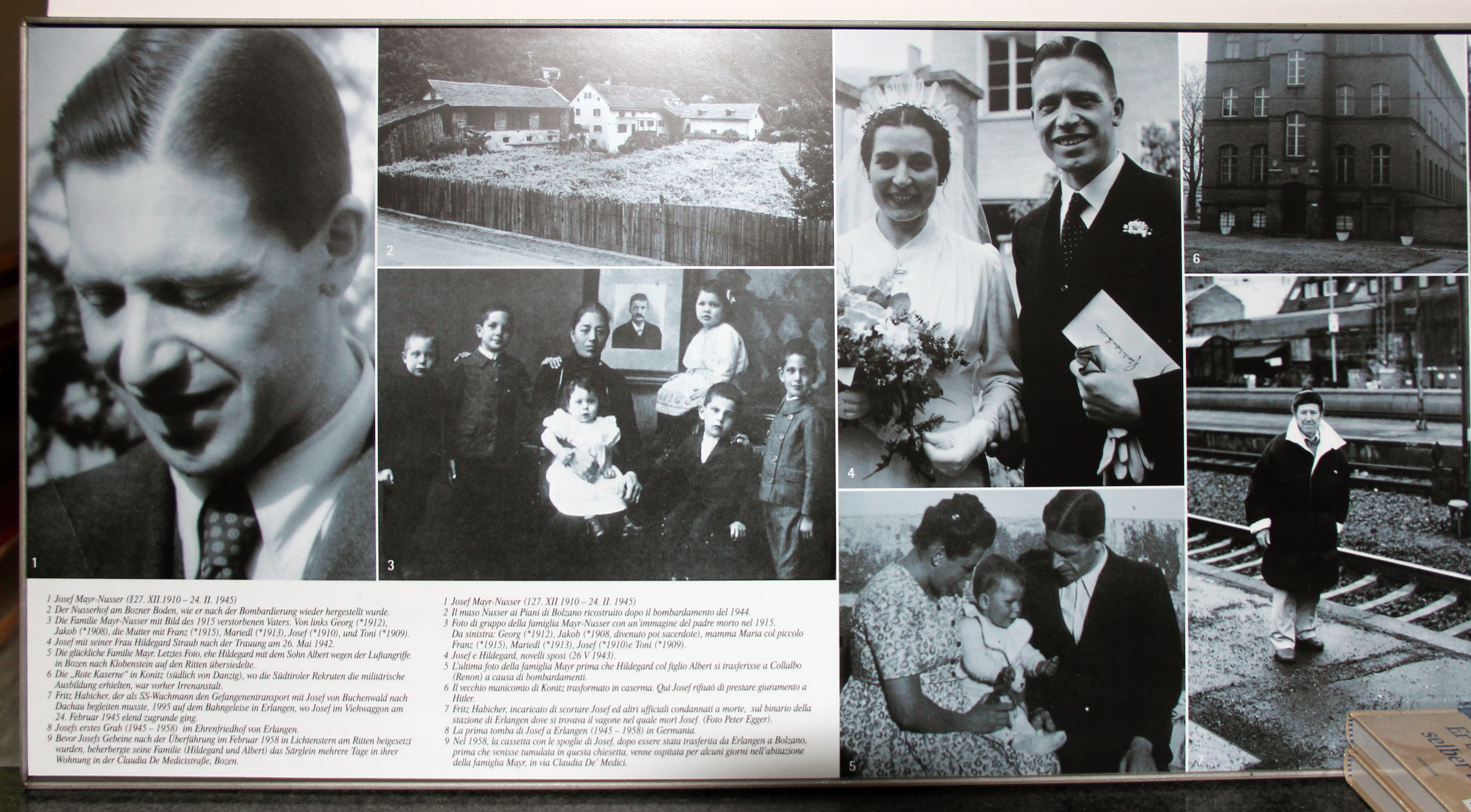
Commemorative plaque of Josef Mayr-Nusser in Ritten, Italy

Josef Mayr-Nusser was born on 27 December 1910 in Bolzano into a rural German-Italian household. He grew up on a farm in which his devout parents instilled in him Christian values along with his elder brother Jakob, who enrolled in a seminary to become a priest.

Mayr-Nusser became fascinated with the life and works of Frederic Ozanam and with the life of Vincent de Paul. To that end, in an attempt to emulate the pair and to help the poor in the spirit of charity, he joined the Society of Saint Vincent de Paul at the age of 22 and became its elected president in 1937. Mayr-Nusser served as the president of the society in its Bolzano division and in that capacity constantly visited the poor, providing them both material and spiritual assistance, in the process becoming a vocal anti-poverty advocate. In a 1938 letter to members, Mayr-Nusser said: "When a brother is going to visit a poor family, you should do everything to organize your time so you can spend at least 10–15 minutes to visit people". In an attempt to deepen his understanding of faith, he studied the letters of Thomas More and the writings of Thomas Aquinas.

Mayr-Nusser's friends nicknamed him "Pepi" in his adolescence and early adulthood. In 1934, he became the head of Catholic Action in the Diocese of Trent, accepting the invitation of Pope Pius XI to broaden his lay activities. In addition to these posts that he filled, Mayr-Nusser secretly became a member of the anti-Nazi movement "Andreas Hofer Bund" in 1939.

On 26 May 1942 he married Hildegard Straub (1907–1998) and his son Alberto was born in 1943.

As part of Nazi conscription during World War II he was enrolled in the SS unit in 1944 which forced him to leave his wife and newborn son for training in Prussia; he was sent off on 7 September 1944. Sometime during the war, his father was killed on the frontlines. Franz Treibenreif (a comrade and friend) said of him on what became a fateful 4 October 1944: "Josef was pensive and worried. Unexpectedly, he raised his hand: 'Sir Major-General', he said with a strong voice, 'I cannot take an oath to Hitler in the name of God. I cannot do it because my faith and conscience do not allow it'". Mayr-Nusser's friends attempted to convince him to recant or to cease from the explosive statement, but he eschewed their offers in order to stand up for his beliefs. Mayr-Nusser believed ardently that National Socialism could not be reconciled in any way with the values of Christian ethics and believed that the ideology ran counter to the divine law of God.

As a result of this Mayr-Nusser was jailed and later transferred to Danzig where he was prosecuted. While he was awaiting trial, Mayer-Nusser took to chopping wood and peeling potatoes, and was given the right to pray during his time in captivity.

From prison Mayr-Nusser sent a range of letters to his wife and said of his actions: "You would not be my wife if you expected something different from me". In February 1945 he was sentenced to death for treason and was ordered to be shot by a firing squad at the Dachau concentration camp. However, he fell ill with dysentery, and en route via train to Dachau with approximately 40 others being sent to the camp, died on the morning of 24 February 1945. When his corpse was discovered, he was found with a Bible and rosary on his person.

Mayr-Nusser's remains were transferred to the Lichtenstern chapel on the Ritten in 1958.

=== Legacy ===
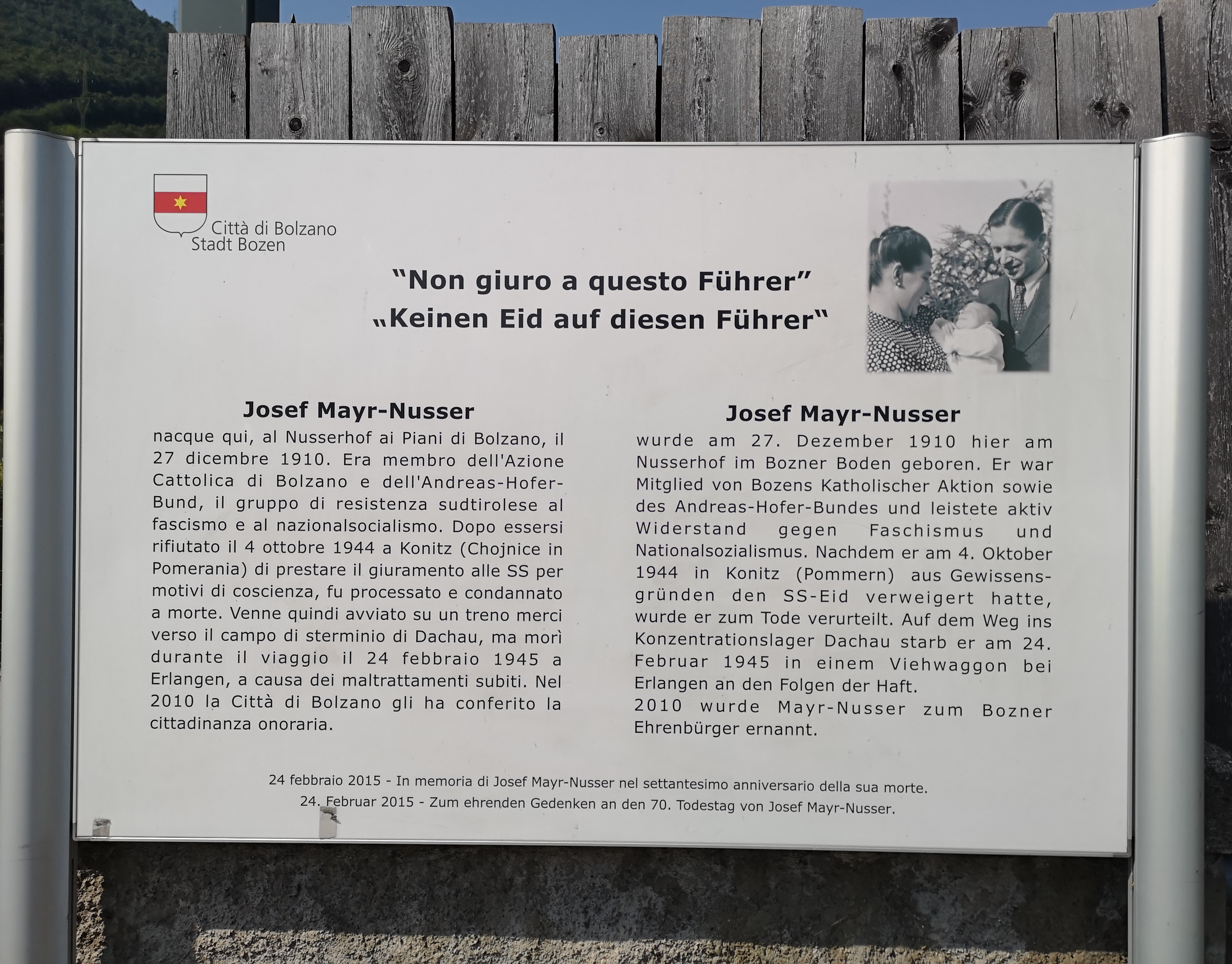
Memorial plaque near the Nusserhof at the Bozner Boden

Several places are named after him as a tribute to his life and sacrifice.

On 19 March 2017 on the feast of Saint Joseph, Pope Francis described Mayr-Nusser as "a model for the lay faithful, especially for fathers, who we remember with great affection today."

== Beatification ==
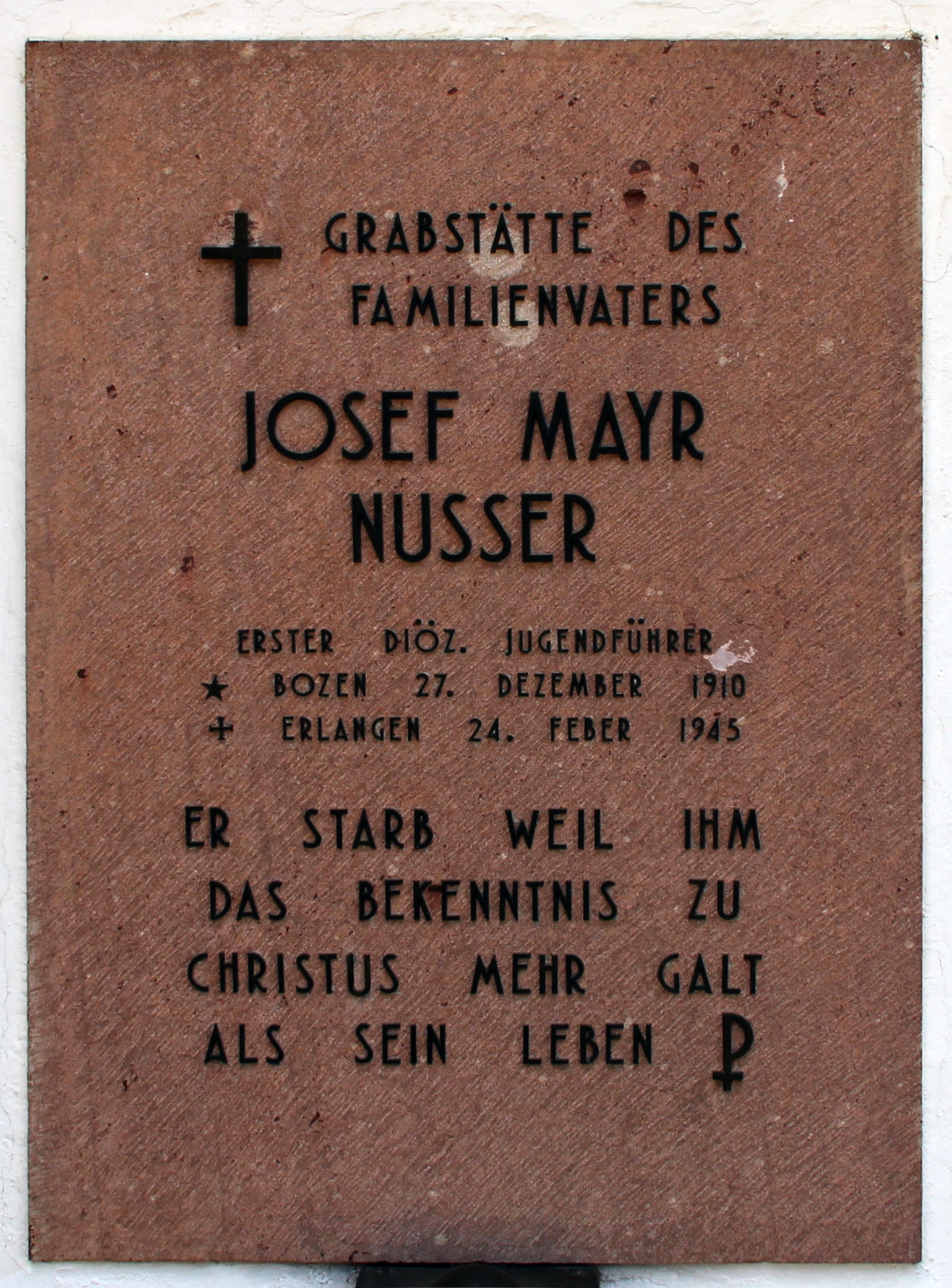
Memorial plaque at Lichtenstern

The beatification process was set to commence in Bolzano after rights for the cause transferred from Bamberg to Bolzano on 23 February 1991. However, the cause did not receive the formal approval from the Congregation for the Causes of Saints until 30 September 2005 at which point he was granted the title Servant of God and the diocesan process could begin. The diocesan process spanned from 24 February 2006 until 19 March 2007 when all documents collated were sent to Rome for further inspection. The decree of validity on the process was granted several years later on 23 April 2010 and allowed for the postulation to draft the Positio on his martyrdom. The Positio was submitted to the Congregation for the Causes of Saints in January 2015.

Pope Francis approved the beatification on 8 July 2016 and he was beatified in Bolzano on 18 March 2017 with Cardinal Angelo Amato presiding over the celebration on the pope's behalf. The current postulator of the cause is Carlo Calloni. The first postulator assigned was Josef Innerhofer.

Historians criticized the fact that the political dimension of Mayr-Nusser's resistance to the Nazi regime had been left out of the process of beatification, since this question also touched on the failure of the Church itself towards both the fascist and the Nazi regime.
