= St. Radegund (Upper Austria) =

- Municipality
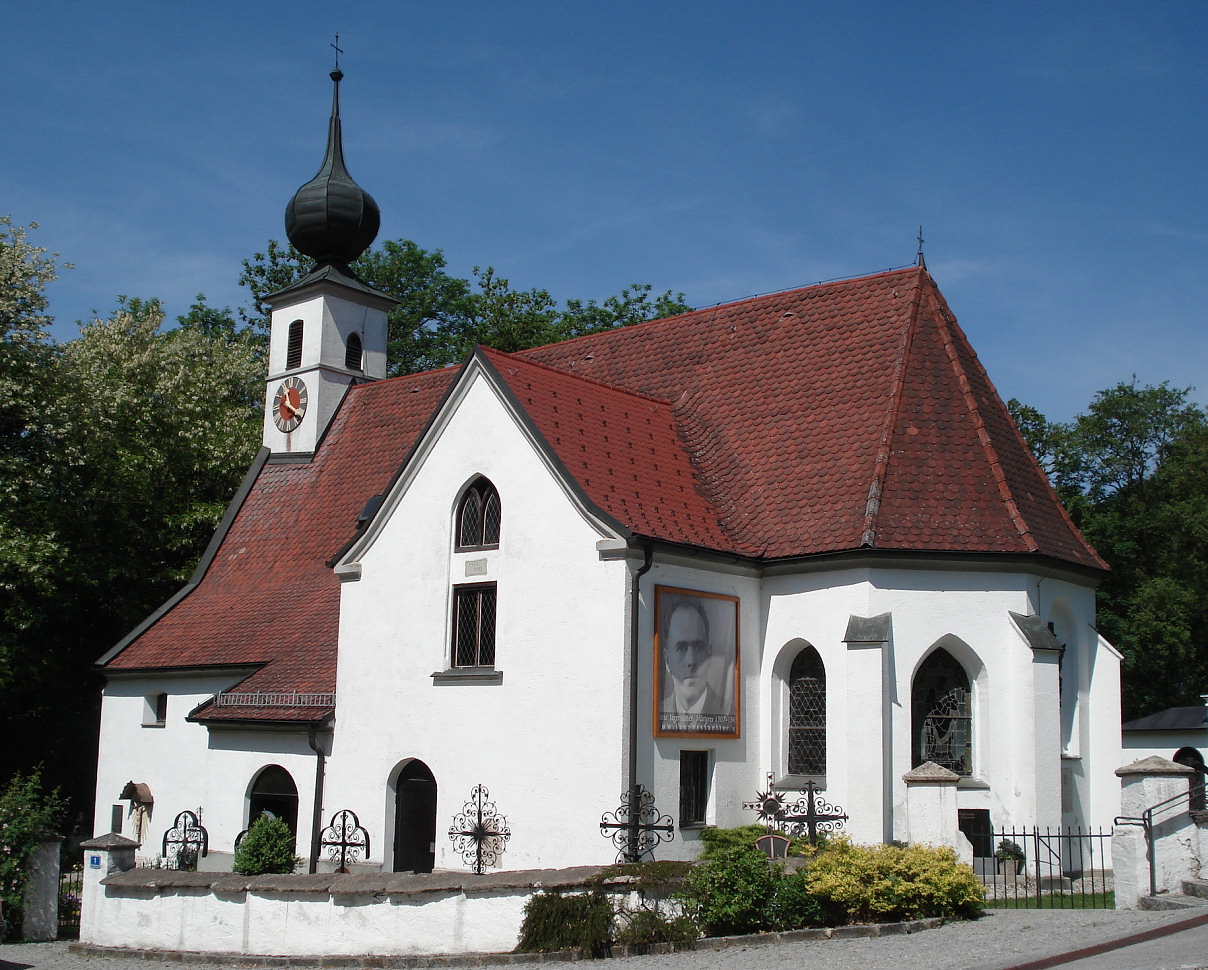

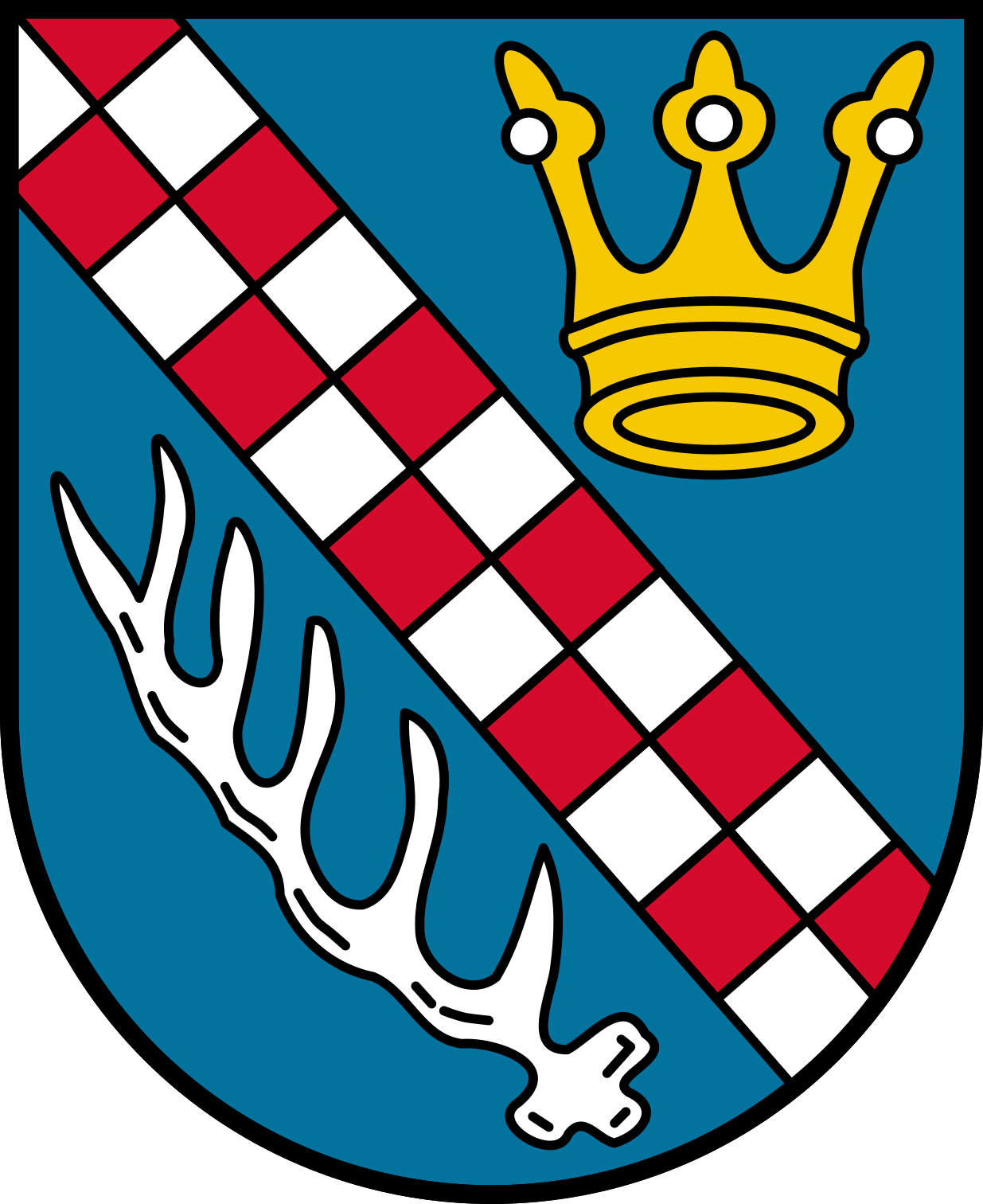
- Coat of arms

- Location within Austria
- Coordinates: 48°05′48″N 12°45′43″E
- Country: Austria
- State: Upper Austria
- District: Braunau

Government
  - Mayor: Simon Sigl (ÖVP)

Area
  - Total: 17.97 km^{2} (6.94 sq mi)
- Elevation: 480 m (1,570 ft)

Population (2018-01-01)
  - Total: 589
  - Density: 32.8/km^{2} (84.9/sq mi)
- Time zone: UTC+1 (CET)
  - Summer (DST): UTC+2 (CEST)
- Postal code: 5121
- Area code: +43 6278
- Vehicle registration: BR
- Website: www.st-radegund.at

St. Radegund is a municipality in the district of Braunau in the Austrian state of Upper Austria, named after Saint Radegund. It is situated at the western rim of the Innviertel region, where the Salzach river forms the border to the German state of Bavaria.

== History ==
Originally a part of the stem duchy of Bavaria, Sankt Radegund together with the Innviertel fell to the Archduchy of Austria according to the rules of the 1779 Treaty of Teschen. In the early 1930s, Joseph Ratzinger, who would later become Pope Benedict XVI, took Sunday walks with his mother to Sankt Radegund "and to other localities on the Austrian side of the Salzach". The village is known as the birthplace of Blessed Franz Jägerstätter, a Catholic farmer and conscientious objector who was executed at Brandenburg-Görden Prison in August 1943. Jägerstätter would eventually be beatified by Pope Benedict XVI on 26 October 2007. Jägerstätter's wife, Franziska Jägerstätter, continued to live in Sankt Radegund up to her death in March 2013, at the age of 100.

== Geography ==
Sankt Radegund lies in the Innviertel region. About 72 percent of the municipality is forest and 22 percent farmland.
