= Grünbach, Upper Austria =

Grünbach
- Municipality
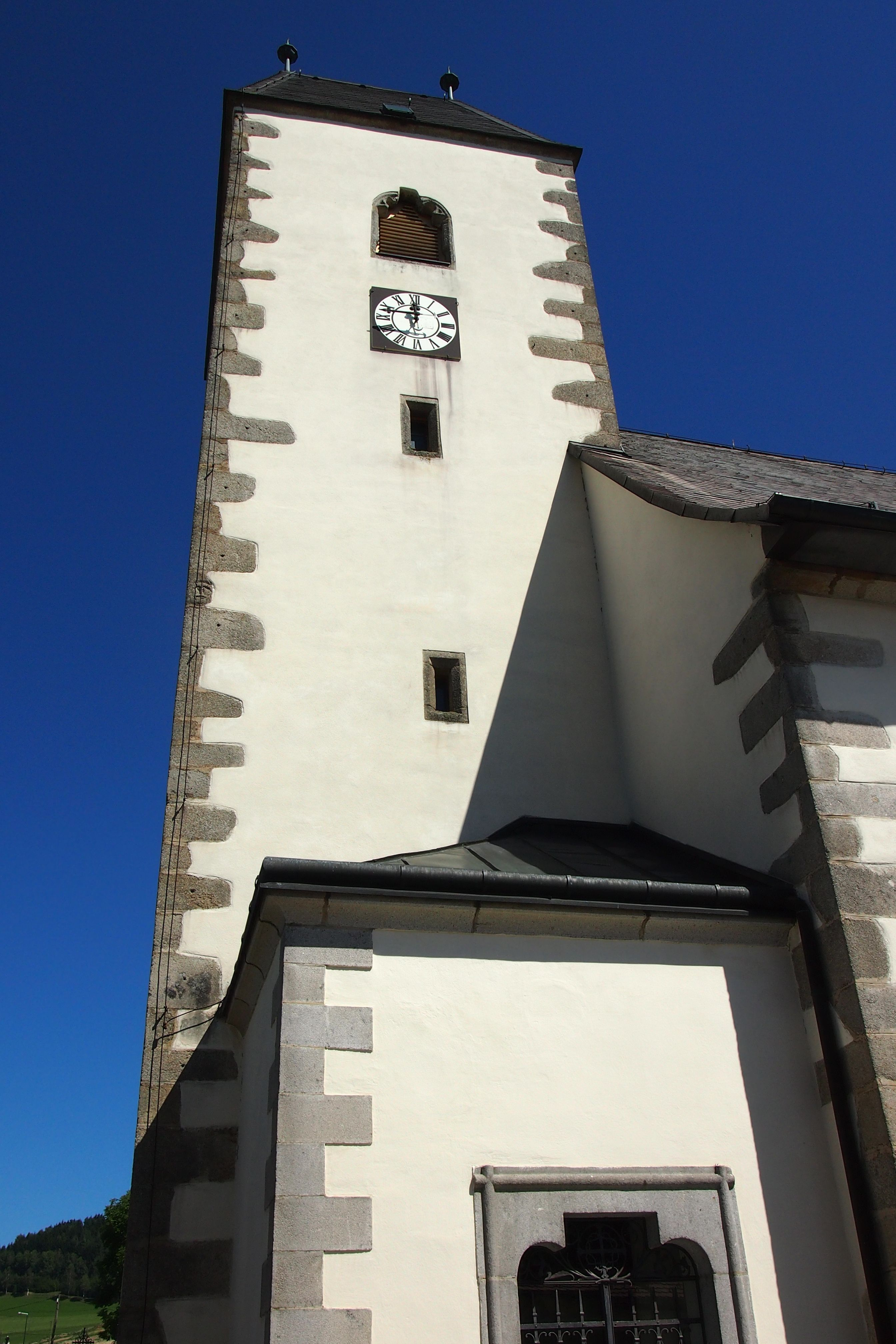

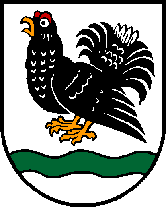
- Coat of arms

- Location within Austria
- Coordinates: 48°32′20″N 14°32′10″E
- Country: Austria
- State: Upper Austria
- District: Freistadt

Government
  - Mayor: Stefan Weißenböck (ÖVP)

Area
  - Total: 36.05 km^{2} (13.92 sq mi)
- Elevation: 721 m (2,365 ft)

Population (2016-01-01)
  - Total: 1,887
  - Density: 52.34/km^{2} (135.6/sq mi)
- Time zone: UTC+1 (CET)
  - Summer (DST): UTC+2 (CEST)
- Postal code: 4264
- Area code: 07942
- Vehicle registration: FR
- Website: www.gruenbach.ooe.gv.at

Grünbach is a municipality in the district of Freistadt in the Austrian state of Upper Austria.

== Population ==
Historical population
Year	Pop.	±%
1869	1,459	—
1880	1,480	+1.4%
1890	1,435	−3.0%
1900	1,535	+7.0%
1910	1,543	+0.5%
1923	1,503	−2.6%
1934	1,513	+0.7%
1939	1,374	−9.2%
1951	1,465	+6.6%
1961	1,440	−1.7%
1971	1,569	+9.0%
1981	1,570	+0.1%
1991	1,641	+4.5%
2001	1,816	+10.7%
