= Strahovice =

- Municipality
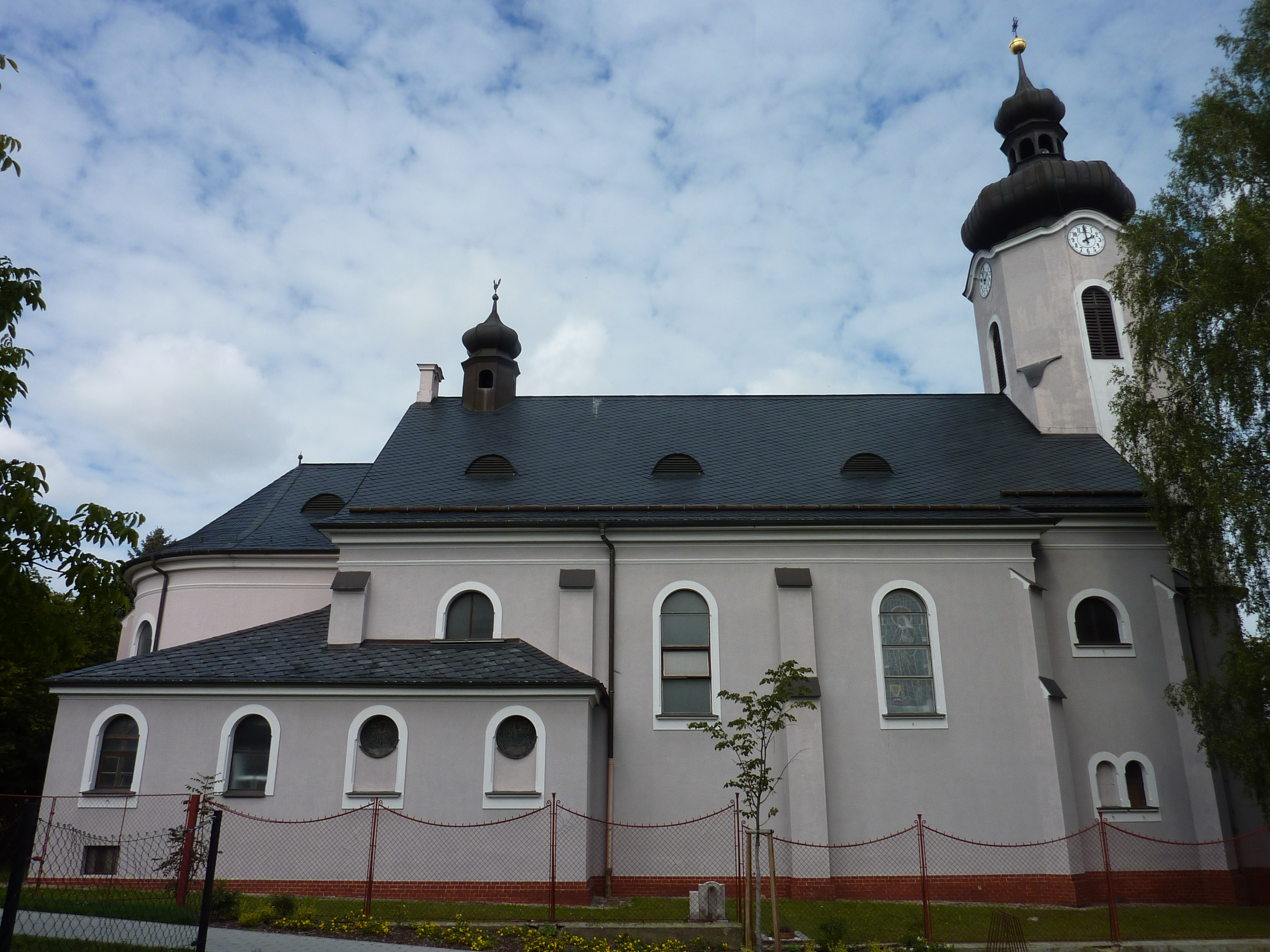
- Church of Saint Augustin

- Flag Coat of arms

- Location in the Czech Republic
- Coordinates: 50°0′7″N 18°5′14″E
- Country: Czech Republic
- Region: Moravian-Silesian
- District: Opava
- First mentioned: 1349

Area
  - Total: 5.07 km^{2} (1.96 sq mi)
- Elevation: 228 m (748 ft)

Population (2026-01-01)
  - Total: 904
  - Density: 178/km^{2} (462/sq mi)
- Time zone: UTC+1 (CET)
  - Summer (DST): UTC+2 (CEST)
- Postal code: 747 24
- Website: www.strahovice.cz

Strahovice (German: Strandorf) is a municipality and village in Opava District in the Moravian-Silesian Region of the Czech Republic. It has about 900 inhabitants. It is part of the historic Hlučín Region.

== History ==
The first written mention of Strahovice is from 1349.

== Demographics ==
Historical population
Year	Pop.	±%
1869	511	—
1880	528	+3.3%
1890	576	+9.1%
1900	589	+2.3%
1910	615	+4.4%
1921	705	+14.6%
1930	693	−1.7%
1950	668	−3.6%
1961	853	+27.7%
1970	864	+1.3%
1980	893	+3.4%
1991	871	−2.5%
2001	892	+2.4%
2011	920	+3.1%
2021	846	−8.0%
Source: Censuses

== Notable people ==
- Richard Henkes (1900–1945), German priest; worked here in 1941–1943

== Twin towns – sister cities ==
Strahovice is twinned with:

- Krzanowice, Poland
- Ruppach-Goldhausen, Germany
