= Sigrid Metz-Göckel =

German sociologist (1940–2025)

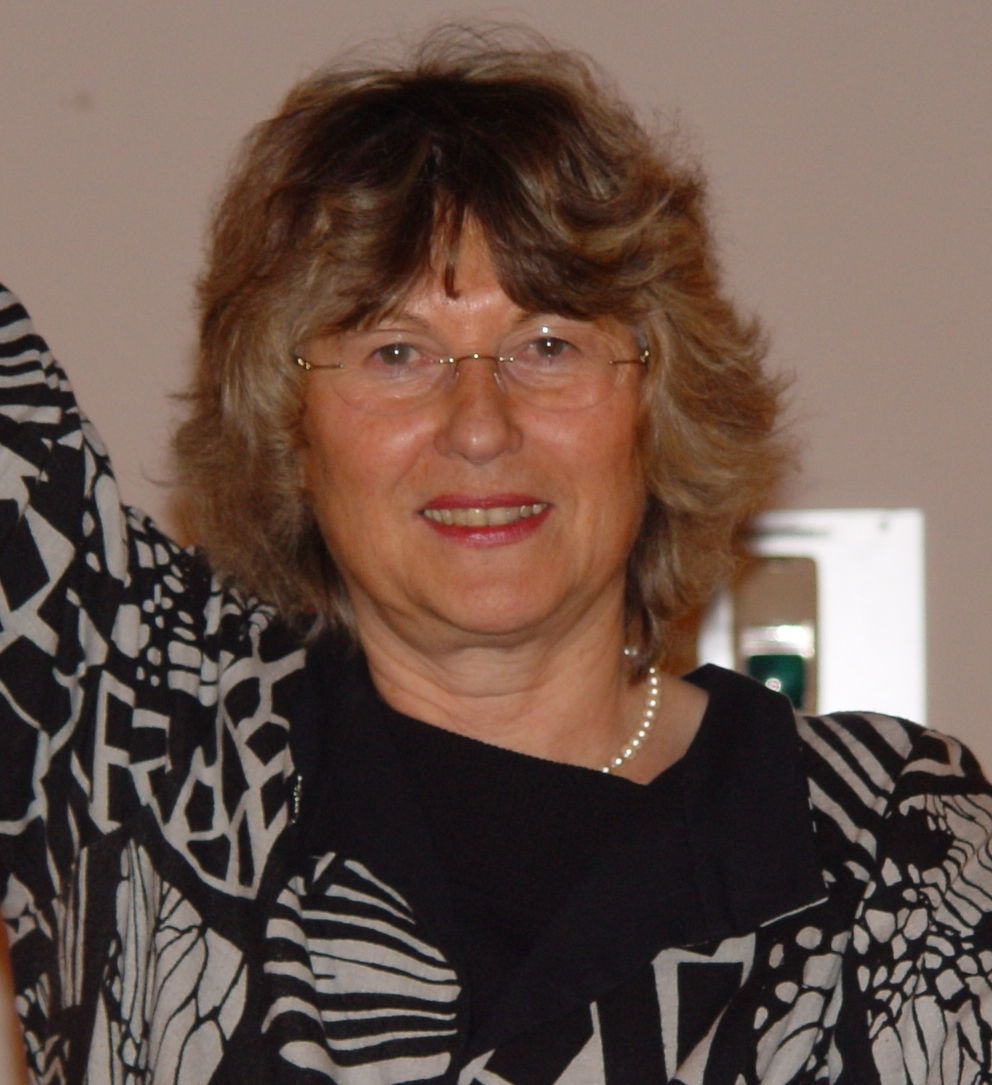
- Metz-Göckel in 2007
- Born: Sigrid Schneider; 18 August 1940; Klein Peterwitz, Gau Silesia, Germany
- Died: 11 February 2025 (aged 84)
- Education: University of Mainz; Goethe University Frankfurt; University of Giessen
- Awards: Order of Merit of the Federal Republic of Germany
- Scientific career
- Fields: Women's studies; Gender studies
- Institutions: University of Dortmund
- Doctoral advisor: Helge Pross

Sigrid Metz-Göckel (née Schneider, 18 August 1940 – 11 February 2025) was a German sociologist, political scientist and social psychologist who specialised in women's and gender studies as well as in educational research and didactics. She was a professor at the University of Dortmund from 1976 to 2005 where she created a didactic centre and pioneered women's studies in Germany, establishing a university course in 1981.

== Early life and education ==
She was born Sigrid Schneider on 18 August 1940 in Klein Peterwitz, Gau Silesia. Metz-Göckel was the daughter of Franz-Josef Schneider, a teacher, and his wife Helene. After her father died as a soldier in the Second World War in 1942, her mother fled with three small children from Silesia and raised them in poor conditions. The first station was in Upper Silesia, where she attended Polish primary school. The family lived in Aurich from 1950. They moved to Hanover in 1950 where she attended the humanistic branch of the Sophienschule.

After her Abitur, Metz-Göckel read economics at the University of Mainz from 1960 to 1961 before studying sociology at the University of Frankfurt, where her teachers included Max Horkheimer, Theodor W. Adorno and Ludwig von Friedeburg. She graduated in 1966. In 1972, she completed doctoral studies in social psychology and political science at the University of Giessen, earning a Ph.D. with a dissertation titled Hochschuldidaktik zwischen Theorie und Praxis (University Didactics between Theory and Practice), supervised by Helge Pross. Thereafter she was a research assistant at the University of Giessen and at Frankfurt's Battelle-Institut.

She furthered her education with research trips to the Jagiellonian University in Kraków, Wellesley College, Massachusetts, and in 1982 to the University of California, Berkeley.

== Career ==
While still in Giessen, Metz-Göckel began to take an interest in women, attending a seminar on the new women's movement in the mid-1970s. She went on to establish a number of women's groups and began looking at women scientists.

In 1976 she was appointed professor at the Pädagogische Hochschule Ruhr (Ruhr School of Education) in the Dortmund region, where her objective was to create a didactic centre (Hochschuldidaktisches Zentrum) for three higher education institutions in Dortmund: the University of Dortmund, the Fachhochschule Dortmund and the Pädagogische Hochschule Ruhr. She established a didactic centre focusing on women's and gender studies, heading it until 2005.

Metz-Göckel also initiated with students Frauenstudien (women's studies) in 1979, an offer of further education especially directed at women who worked for women (Frauenarbeit) full-time, part-time or as volunteers. The Pädagogische Hochschule Ruhr became part of the university in 1980; she was one of three women professors at the university. Frauenstudien was established in 1981 as an official course of study at the university, to which she contributed as scientific director until 2002. She was emerited in 2005.

As leader of the didactic centre, she engaged on behalf of the situation of women scientists, founding the working group Arbeitskreis Wissenschaftlerinnen von Nordrhein-Westfalen in contact with the Ministry of culture and science of North Rhine-Westphalia. In 1979 she was a co-founder of the women's studies section of the German Sociological Association, in 1984 co-founder of the women's studies of the Deutsche Gesellschaft für Erziehungswissenschaft.

In the 1980s, together with the sociologist Ursula Müller, she conducted a study on men titled Der Mann. Eine repräsentative Untersuchung über die Lebenssituation und das Frauenbild 20- bis 50-jähriger Männer (Man: A representative study of the situation in life and the image of women among 20- to 50-year-old men), focusing on the emancipation of men and how they viewed women. She founded the Stiftung Aufmüpfige Frauen (Defiant Women Foundation) in 2004.

== Personal life ==
She married psychologist Hellmuth Metz-Göckel in 1968; the couple had no children.

Metz-Göckel died after a brief serious illness on 11 February 2025, at the age of 84.

== Awards ==
In 1998, Metz-Göckel was honoured with the Cross of the Order of Merit of the Federal Republic of Germany.
