= Krzanowice =

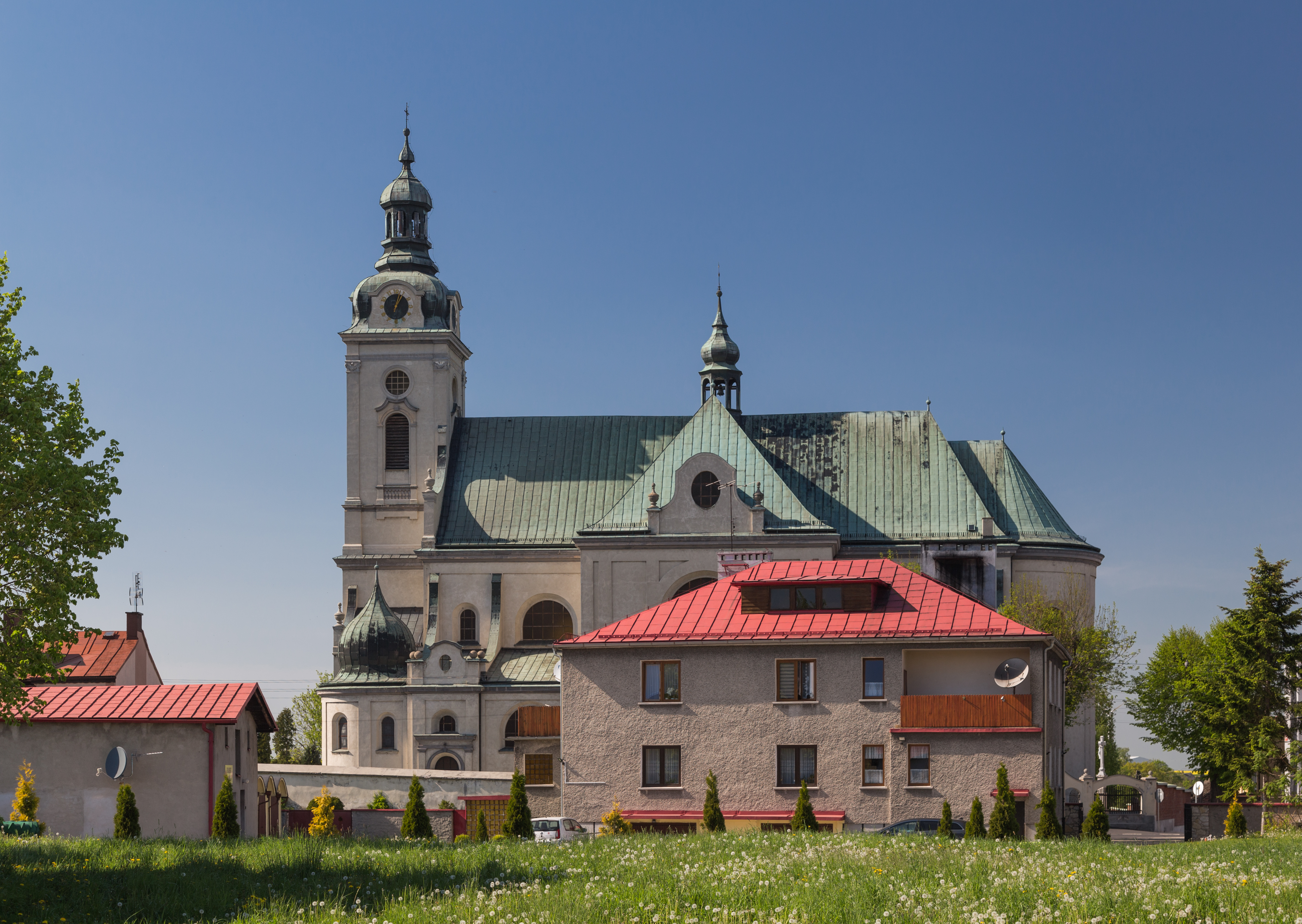
- Church of Saint Wenceslaus

- Coat of arms
- Interactive map of Krzanowice
- Location within Poland
- Coordinates: 50°1′14″N 18°7′39″E
- Country: Poland
- Voivodeship: Silesian
- County: Racibórz
- Gmina: Krzanowice

Area
  - Total: 3.19 km^{2} (1.23 sq mi)

Population (2019-06-30)
  - Total: 2,157
  - Density: 676/km^{2} (1,750/sq mi)
- Postal code: 47-470
- Website: www.krzanowice.pl

Krzanowice [kʂanɔˈvʲit͡sɛ] (German: Kranowitz, from 1936 to 1945 Kranstädt) is a town in Racibórz County, Silesian Voivodeship, Poland, with 2,157 inhabitants (2019).

== Notable people ==
- Vincenz Kollar (1797–1860), Austrian entomologist
- Max Schirschin (1921–2013), German footballer
- Anna Bocson (born 1936), Polish-Australian athlete

== Gallery ==
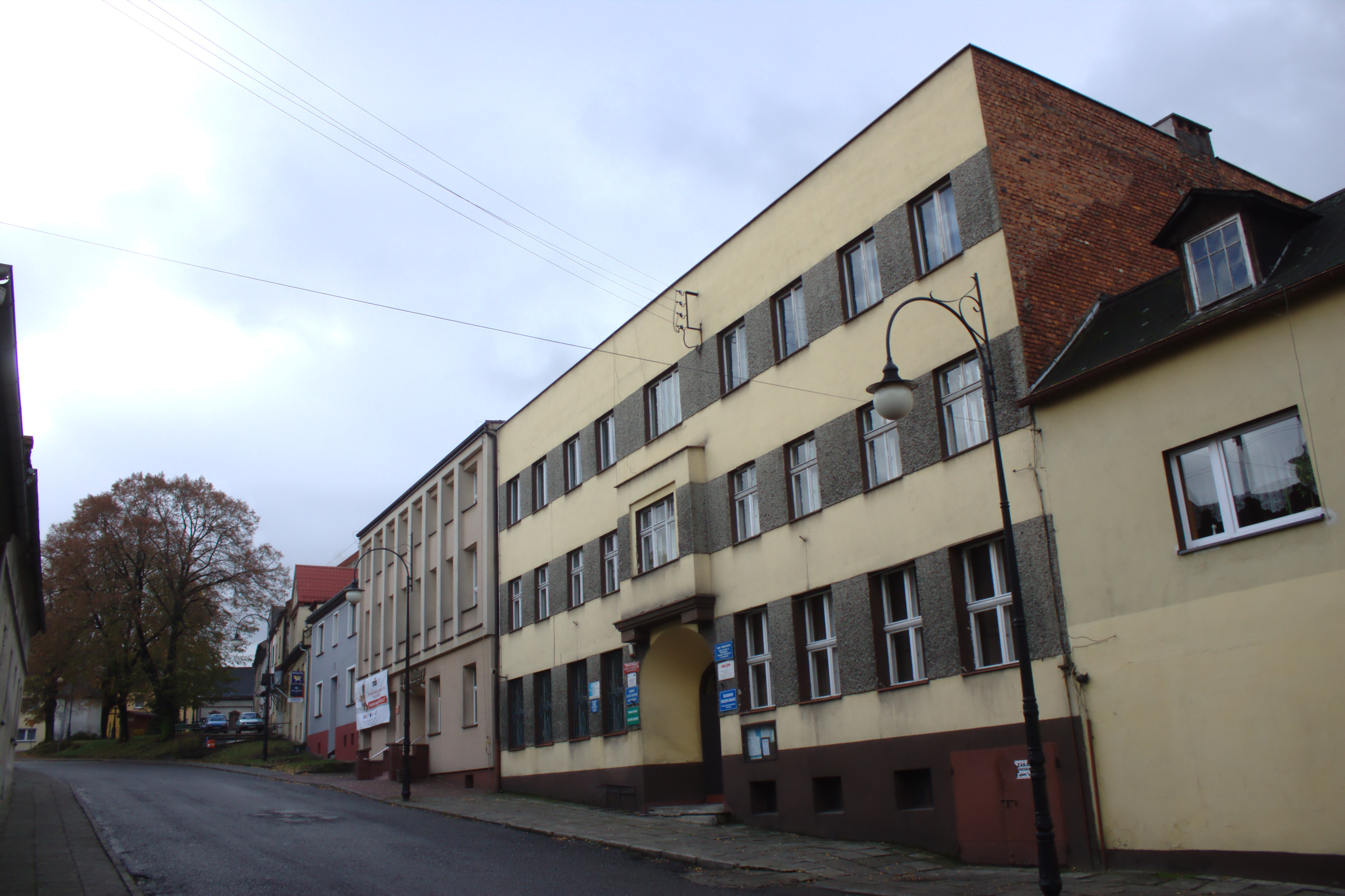
Street

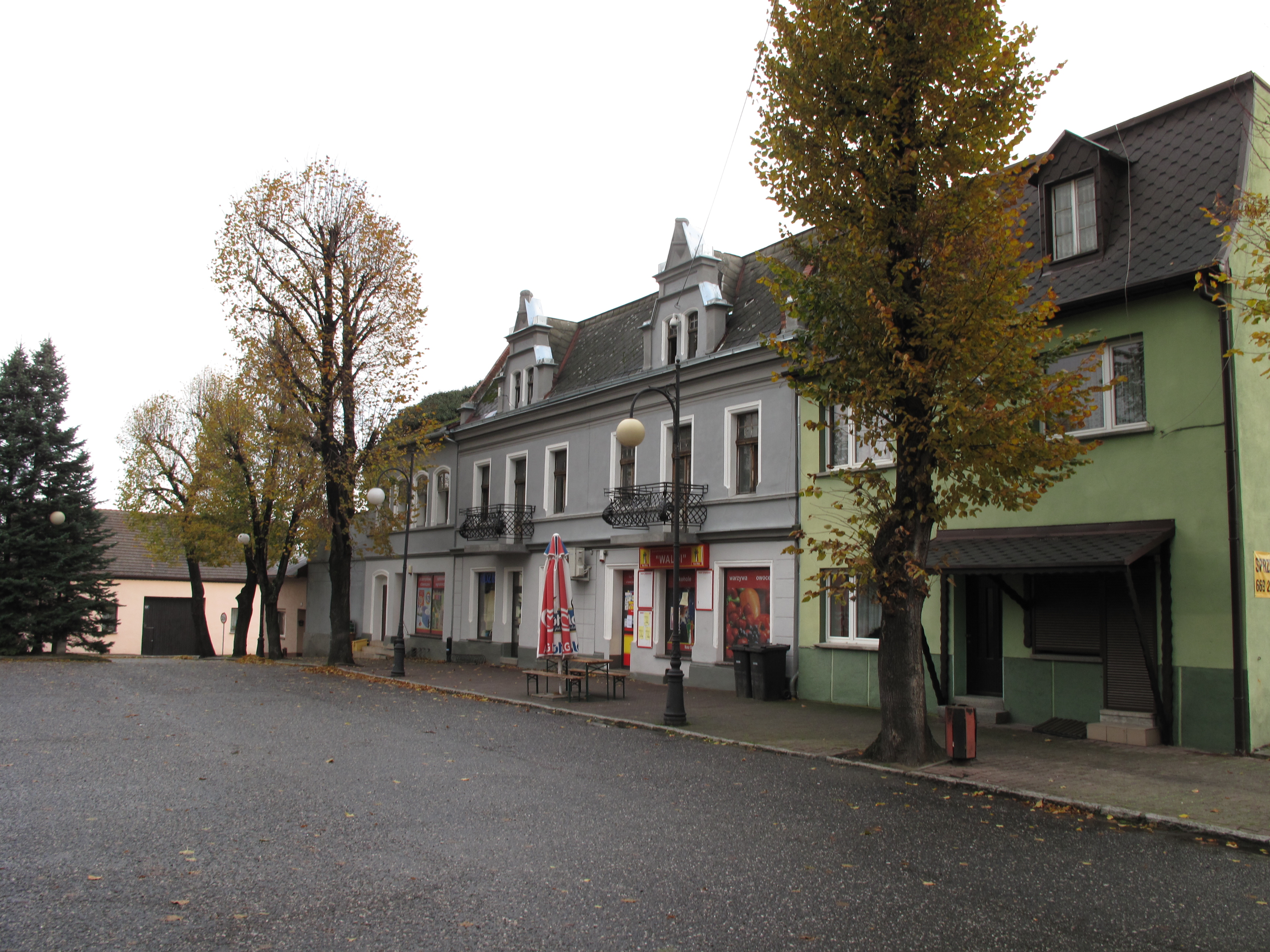
Houses on the square

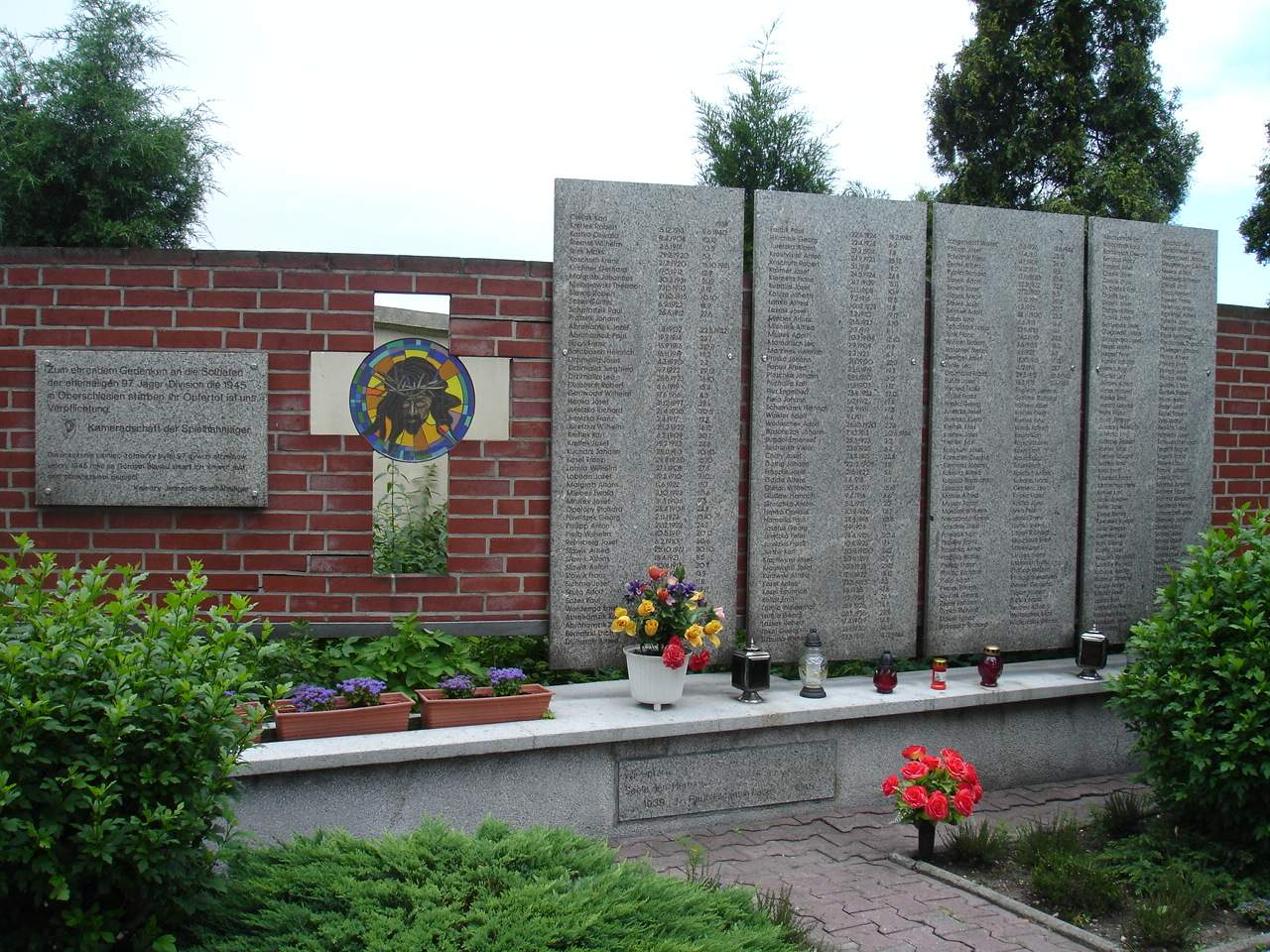
Memorial
