= Gmina Krzanowice =

Gmina Krzanowice Gemeinde Kranowitz Krzanowice Commune
- Gmina
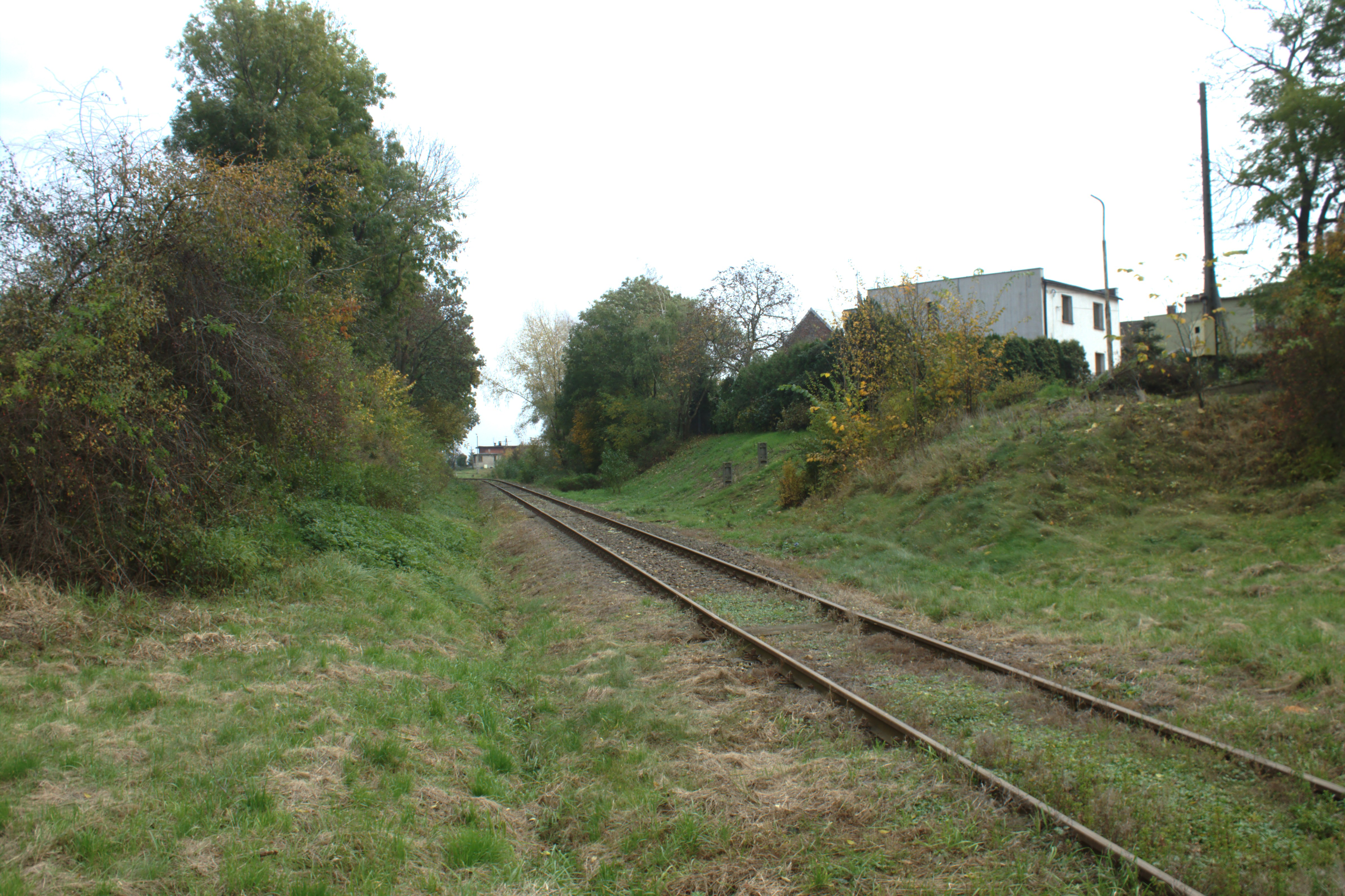
- Railroad in Wojnowice

- Coat of arms
- Interactive map of Gmina Krzanowice; Gemeinde Kranowitz
- Coordinates (Krzanowice): 50°1′14″N 18°7′39″E
- Country: Poland
- Voivodeship: Silesian
- County: Racibórz
- Seat: Krzanowice

Area
  - Total: 47.06 km^{2} (18.17 sq mi)

Population (2019-06-30)
  - Total: 5,739
  - Density: 122.0/km^{2} (315.9/sq mi)
  - Urban: 2,157
  - Rural: 3,582
- Website: http://www.krzanowice.pl

Gmina Krzanowice, German Gemeinde Kranowitz is an urban-rural gmina (administrative district) in Racibórz County, Silesian Voivodeship, in southern Poland, on the Czech border. Its seat is the town of Krzanowice (Kranowitz), which lies approximately 11 kilometres (7 mi) south-west of Racibórz and 68 km (42 mi) west of the regional capital Katowice.

The gmina covers an area of 47.06 square kilometres (18.2 sq mi), and as of 2019, its total population was 5,739. Since 2008 the commune has been bilingual in German and Polish, and has its signs in two languages. These signs celebrate the multicultural past of the region, which was prior to 1945 part of Germany and still maintains a large German population.

== Administrative divisions ==
Apart from the town of Krzanowice, Gmina Krzanowice contains the villages and settlements of Krzanowice, Bojanów, Borucin, Pietraszyn and Wojnowice.

== Neighbouring gminas ==
Gmina Krzanowice is bordered by the town of Racibórz and by the gminas of Krzyżanowice and Pietrowice Wielkie. It also borders the Czech Republic.

== Twin towns – sister cities ==
Gmina Krzanowice is twinned with:

- Strahovice, Czech Republic

== Gallery ==
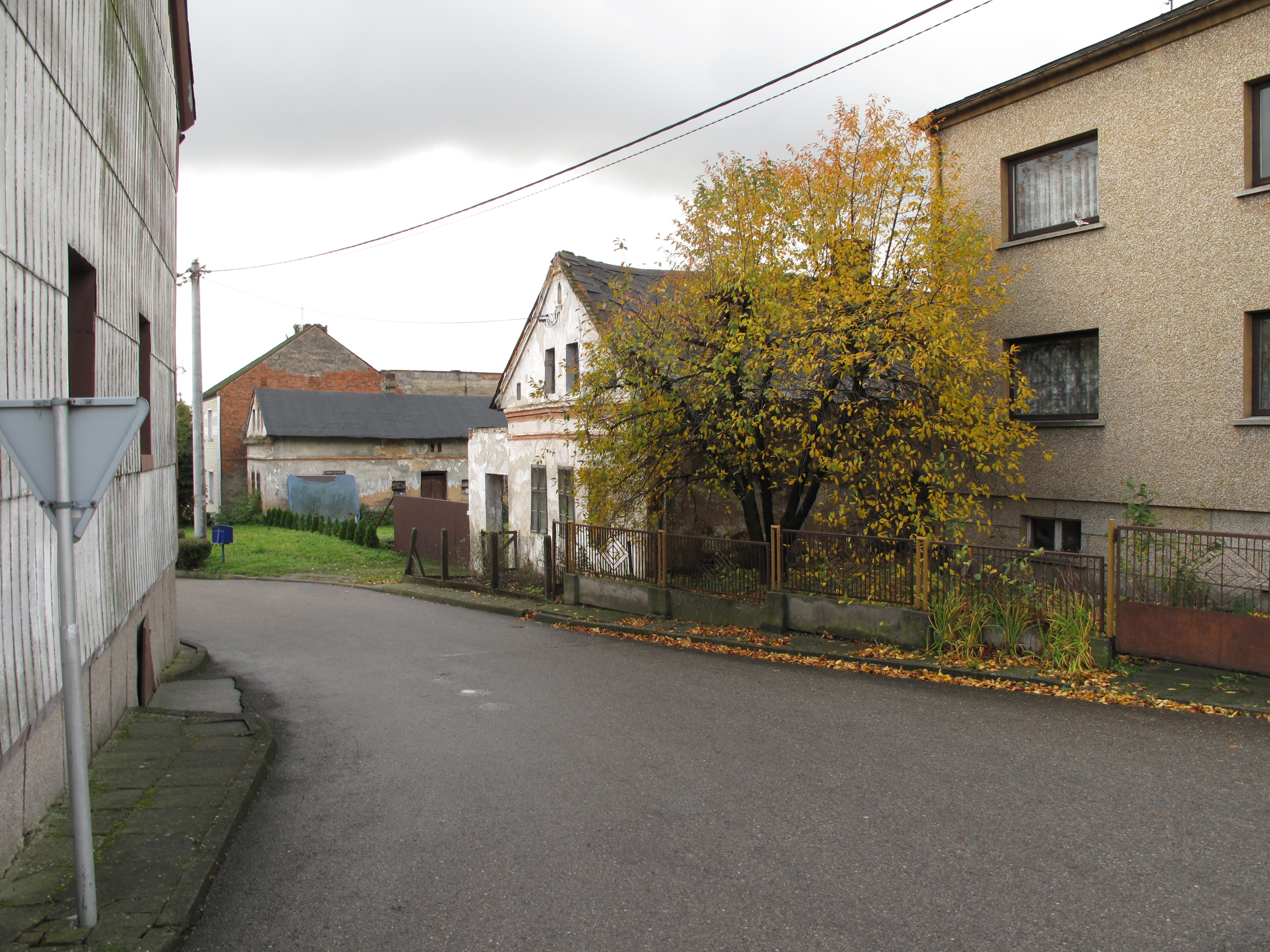
Street in Pietraszyn

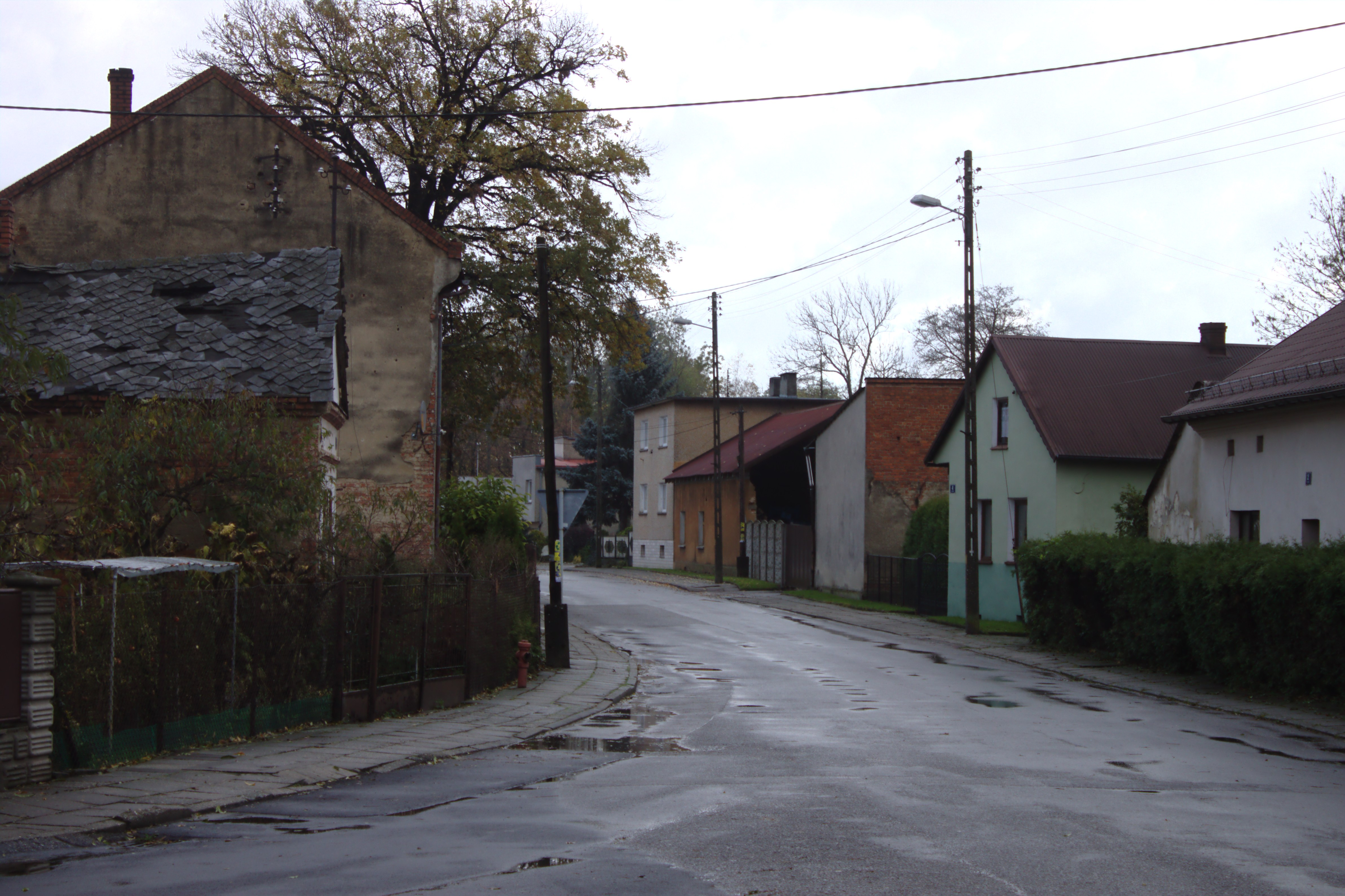
Street in Krzanowice

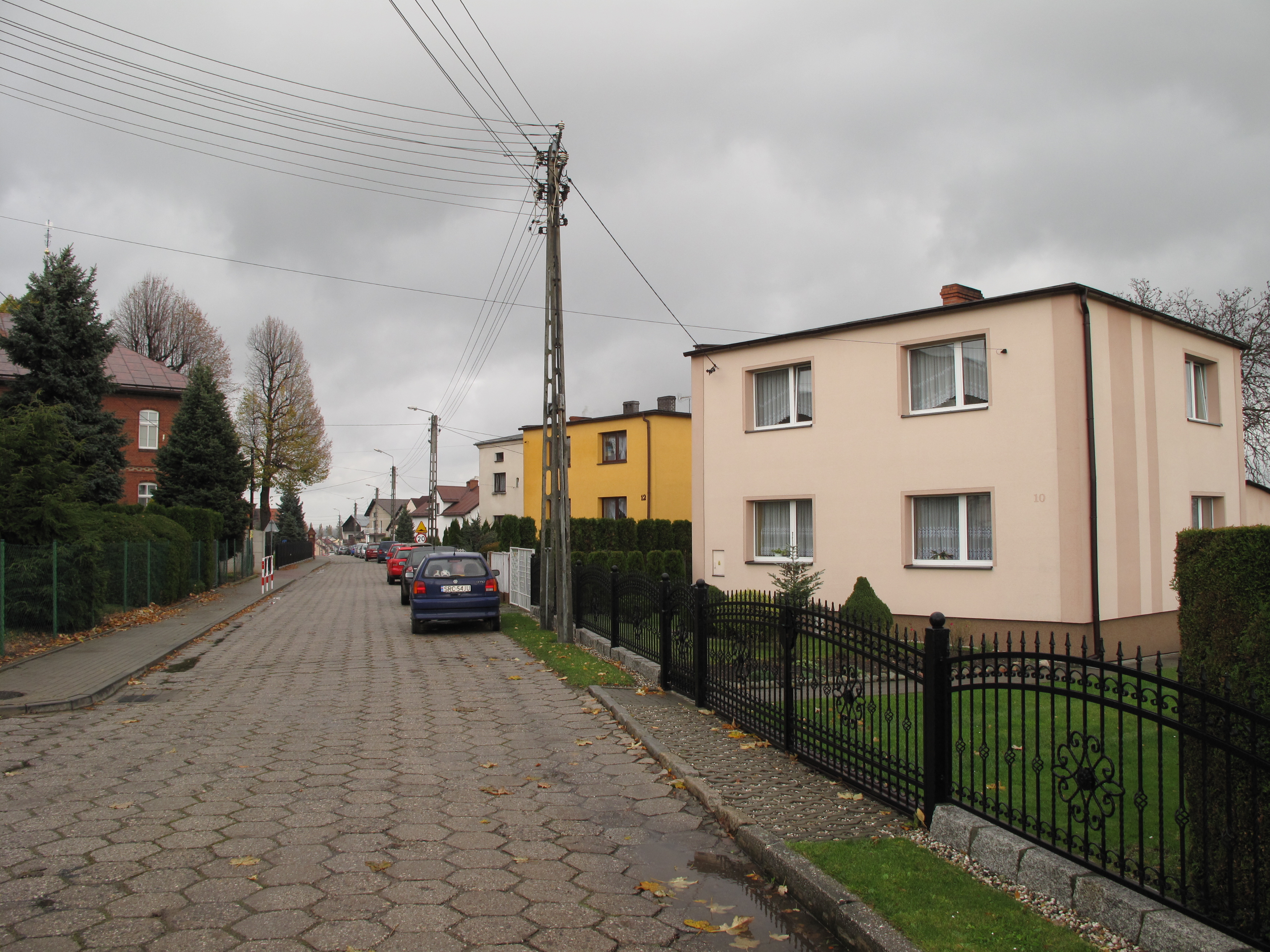
Street in Borucin
