= Paulusheim =

St. Paulusheim
- Gymnasium Sancti Pauli Bruchsaliae
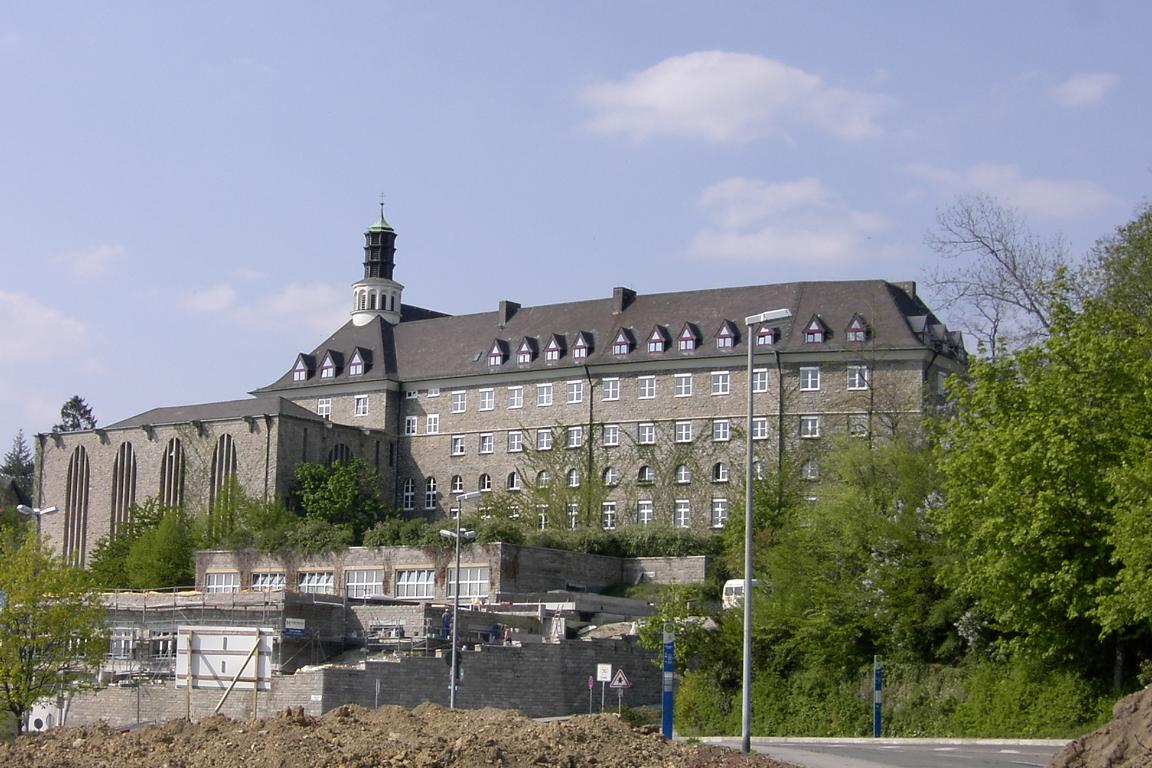

Location
- Huttenstr. 49; Bruchsal, Baden-Württemberg, 76646; Germany; 49°07′31″N 8°36′23″E

Information
- School type: sponsorship of the school foundation of the archdiocese of Freiburg, Independent Gymnasium
- Religious affiliation: Catholic
- Founder: Pallottines
- Headmaster: Markus Zepp
- Enrollment: approx. 750
- Language: German
- Newspaper: Kaktus
- Yearbook: Jahresbericht
- Website: www.paulusheim.de

St. Paulusheim is an independent Gymnasium in Bruchsal, Germany with sponsorship of the school foundation of the archdiocese of Freiburg.

It was founded by the Pallottines, originally as a boys' boarding school. Paulusheim is rooted in a boarding school of the small Italian community of Masio near Alessandria. In 1915, Pallottines had to leave Masio because of the war. So they came to Bruchsal, the former homeland of the headteacher. After temporary accommodation in an inn, they moved into a new purpose-built building on the cloister hill in Bruchsal. During World War II, the nazis shut down the school for some time. However, it was the first school of Northern Baden to continue teaching. As there were not enough boarding school pupils, the boarding school was closed in the 80s, but the day school has been continued and expanded. Today approx. 750 Catholic and Protestant pupils attend this school. It offers a new and old language stream covering Latin, English, French, and Ancient Greek. Spanish and Chinese are offered in extracurricular classes.
