= Union of Catholic Apostolate =

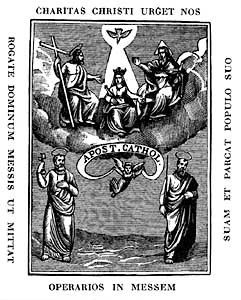
First emblem of the Union of Catholic Apostolate

Union of Catholic Apostolate is a Catholic association established by a Roman priest St. Vincent Pallotti in 1835.

== History ==
With a group of associates and collaborators, Vincent Pallotti developed in the city of Rome a large structure of apostolic activity, beginning with the founding in 1835 of the Society of the Catholic Apostolate (better known as the Pallottines, a community of priests and brothers. As the work expanded, he strove to unite and co-ordinate these activities. From this effort arose the idea of founding a new institution, that is, “the Union of Catholic Apostolate”, to unite all of his apostolic initiatives.

Pallotti later founded the Union of Catholic Apostolate expresses his idea in the following words: "The Catholic Apostolate, that is the universal apostolate, which is common to all classes of people, consists in doing all that one must and can do for the greater glory of God and for one’s own salvation and that of one’s neighbor." On 11 July 1835, Pope Gregory XVI gave his approval.

== Members ==
- The Society of Catholic Apostolate ("Pallottines"), (SAC) is one of the communities Vincent Pallotti himself founded.
- The Congregation of the Sisters of the Catholic Apostolate, (CSAC)
- The Missionary Sisters of the Catholic Apostolate.

A characteristic feature of the Union is the equality of rights and duties of all its members, be it religious, ordained or the lay faithful. All exercise the apostolate of Jesus Christ in the Church and in the world. What differentiates the members is the variety of vocations and callings they live.

The Union was officially recognised by the Pontifical Council for the Laity as an international association of the Catholic Church on 28 October 2003. Its Statutes were then approved provisionally (ad experimentum) for the period of five years and then definitively approved on 28 October 2008. The first President of the General Coordination Council of the UAC was Fr Seamus Freeman SAC. The second President was Fr. Jeremiah Murphy, S.A.C. Then in 2015 and again in 2018 Donatelli Acerbi, a Roman laywoman, was elected and ratified as president.

The UAC is active in 45 countries on six continents.
