= Borucin, Silesian Voivodeship =

Borucin
- Village
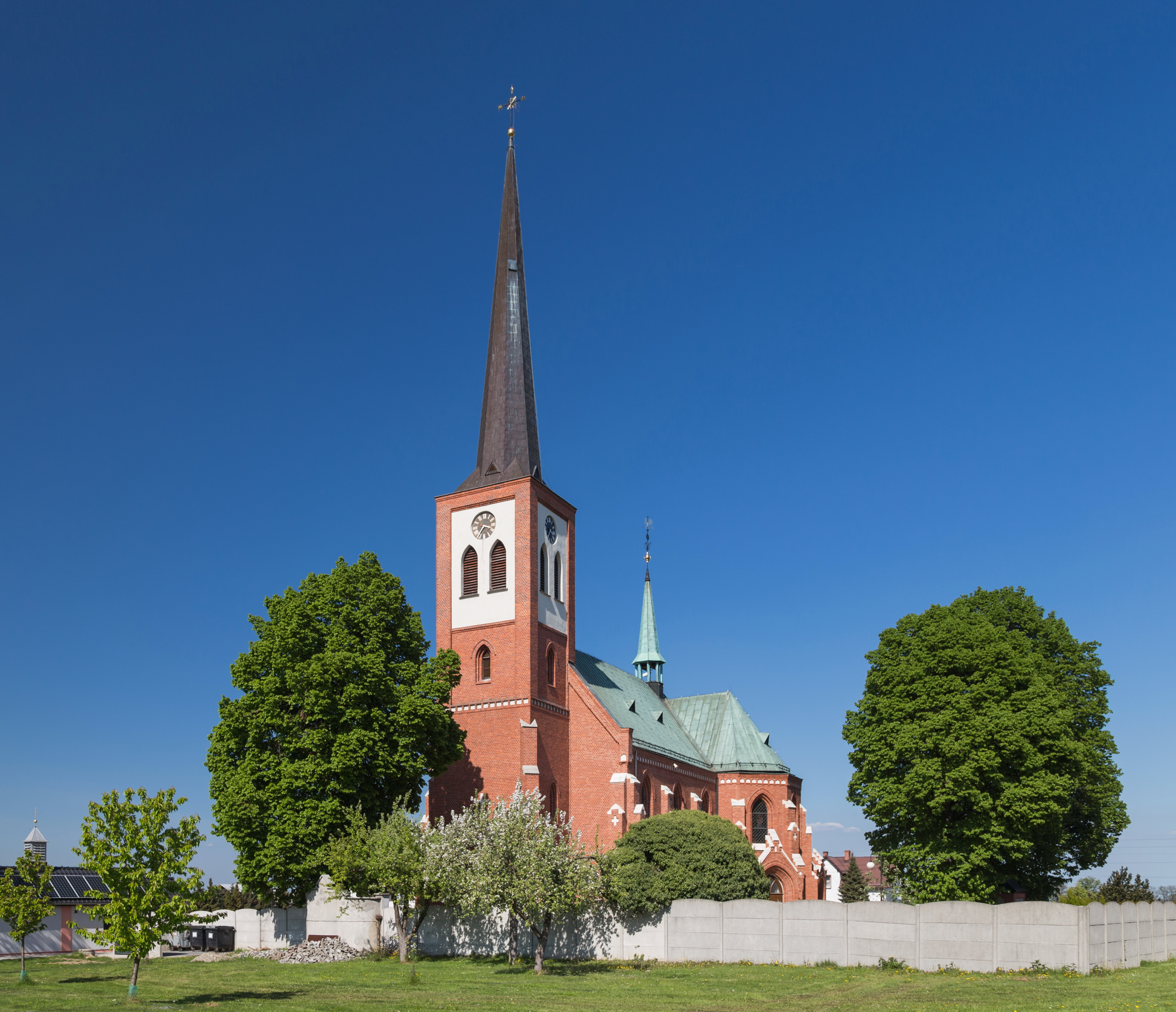
- Saint Augustinus church

- Location within Poland
- Coordinates: 50°0′N 18°9′E
- Country: Poland
- Voivodeship: Silesian
- County: Racibórz
- Gmina: Krzanowice
- Population: 1,300

Borucin [bɔˈrut͡ɕin] is a village in the administrative district of Gmina Krzanowice, within Racibórz County, Silesian Voivodeship, in southern Poland, close to the Czech border.

== Gallery ==
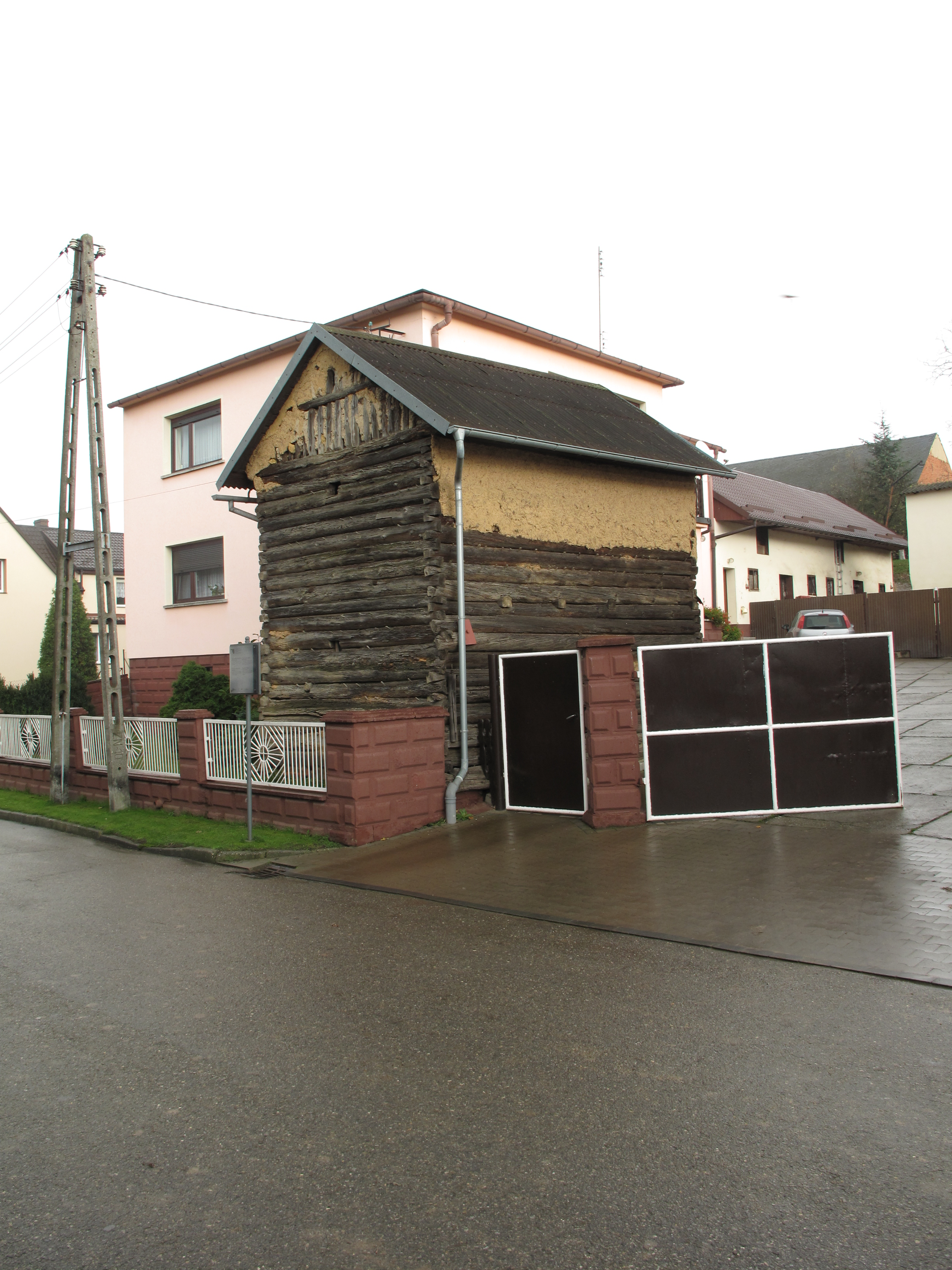
Log cabin

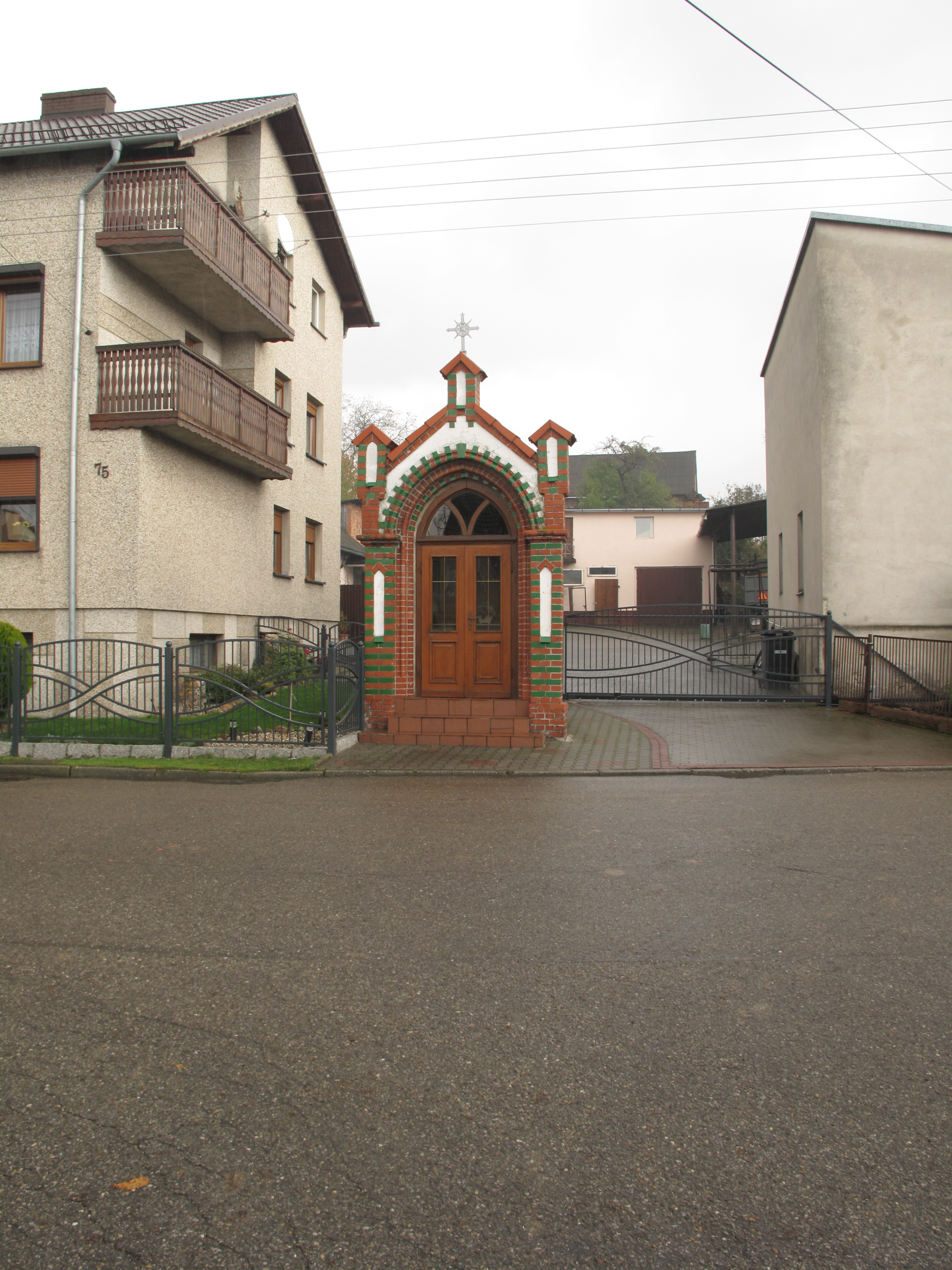
Chapell

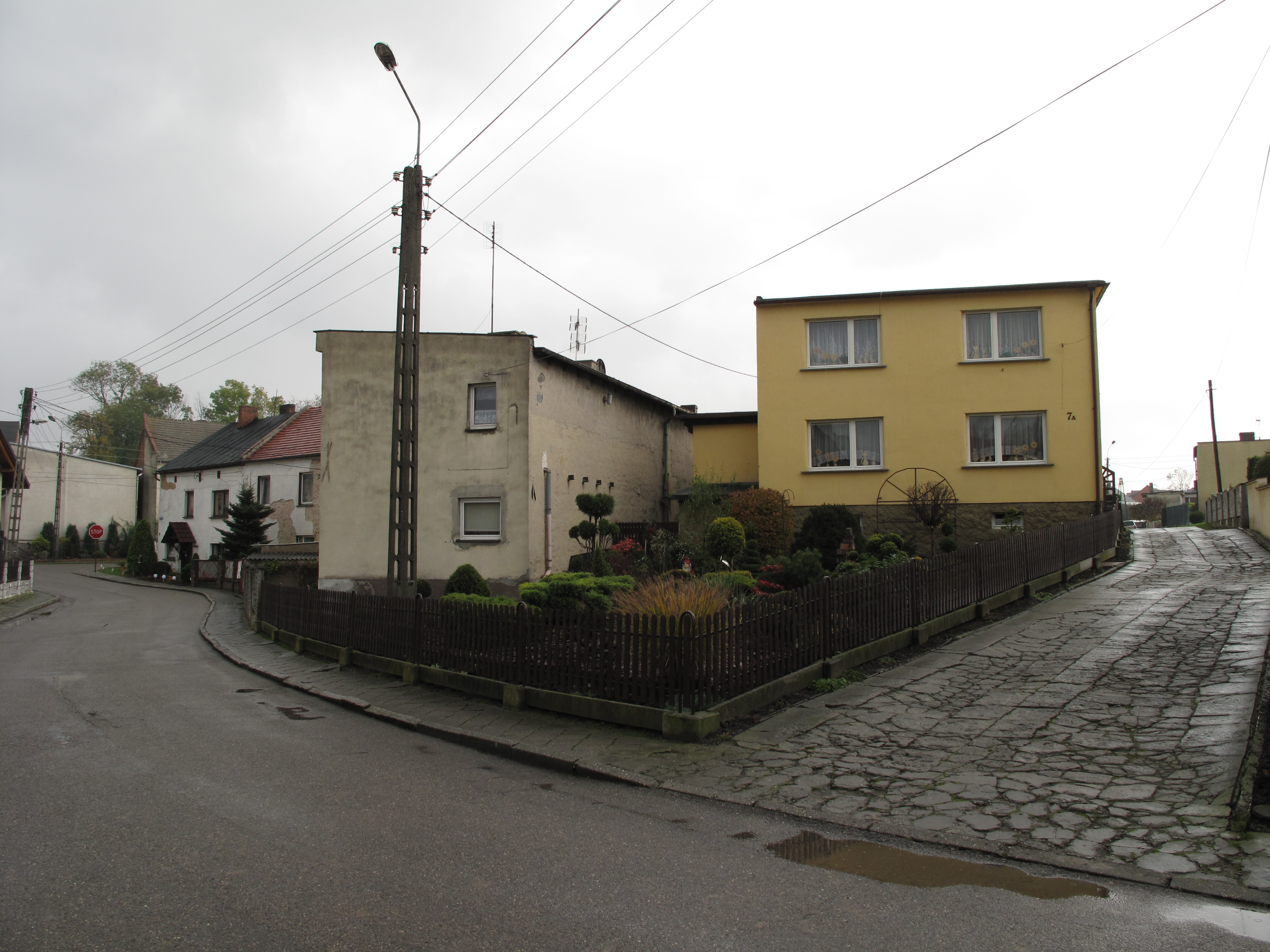
Houses
