= Bojanów, Silesian Voivodeship =

Bojanów
- Village
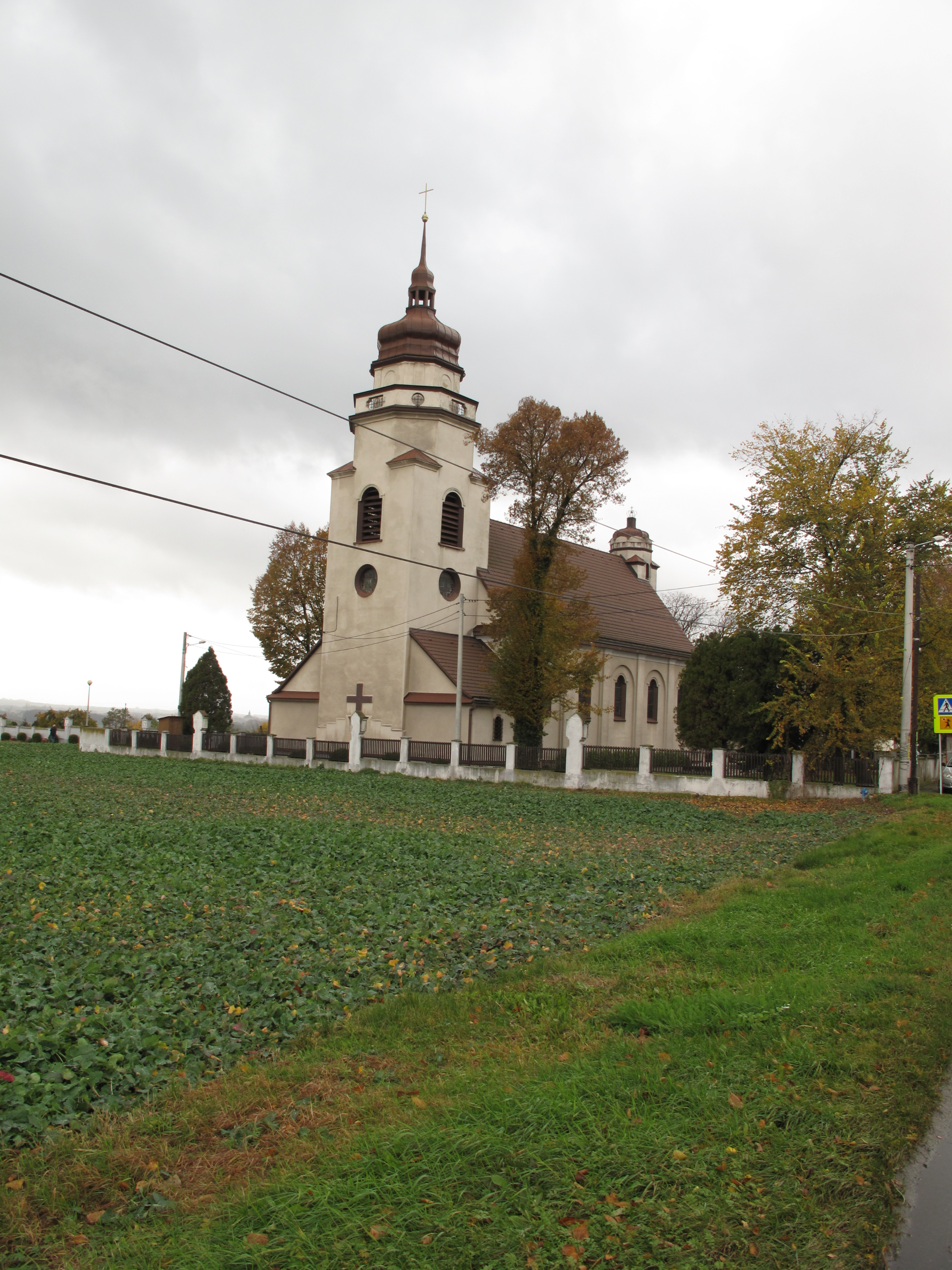
- Church

- Location within Poland
- Coordinates: 50°1′N 18°9′E
- Country: Poland
- Voivodeship: Silesian
- County: Racibórz
- Gmina: Krzanowice
- Population: 830

Bojanów [bɔˈjanuf] is a village in the administrative district of Gmina Krzanowice, within Racibórz County, Silesian Voivodeship, in southern Poland, close to the Czech border.

== Gallery ==
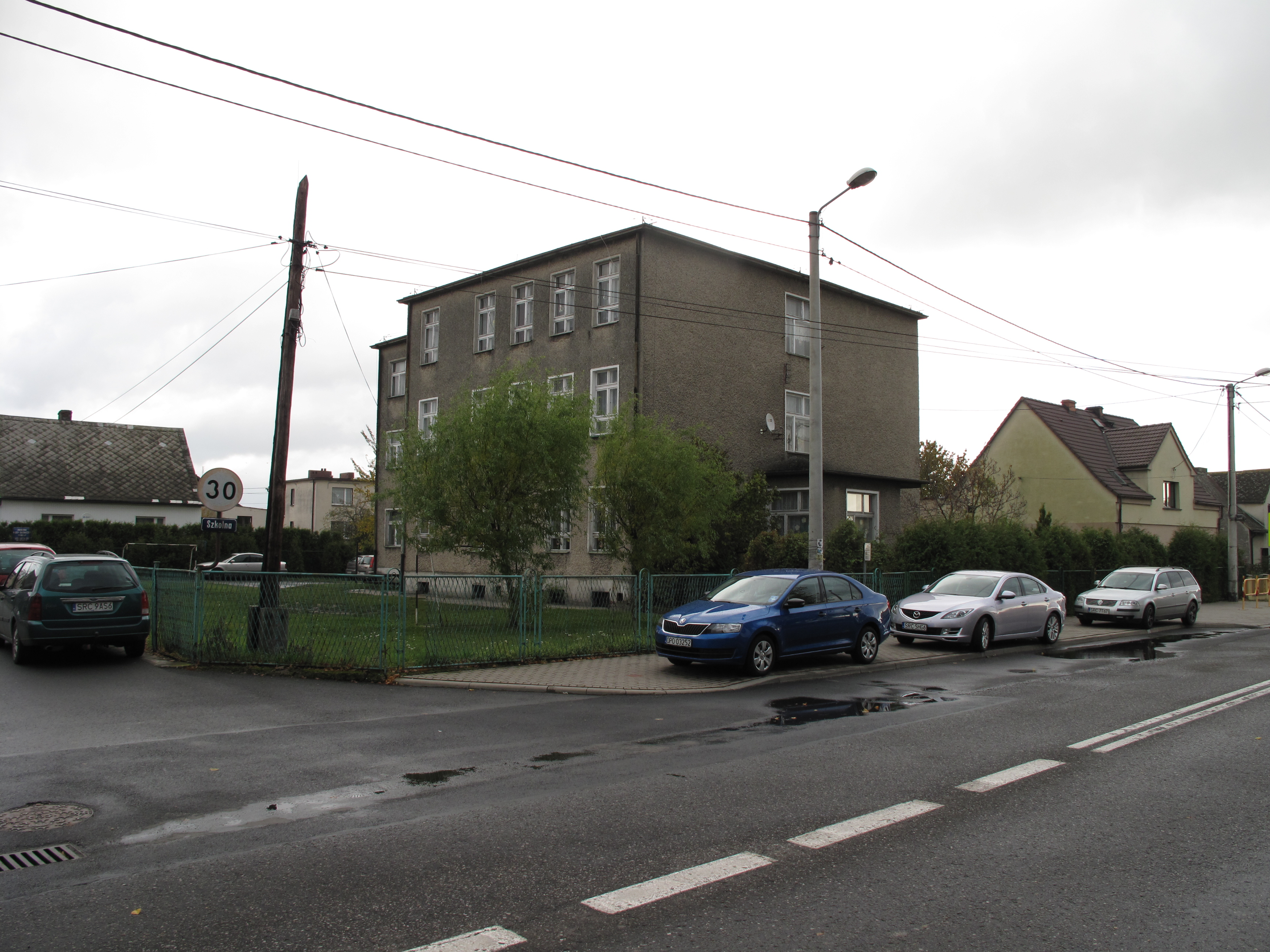
School

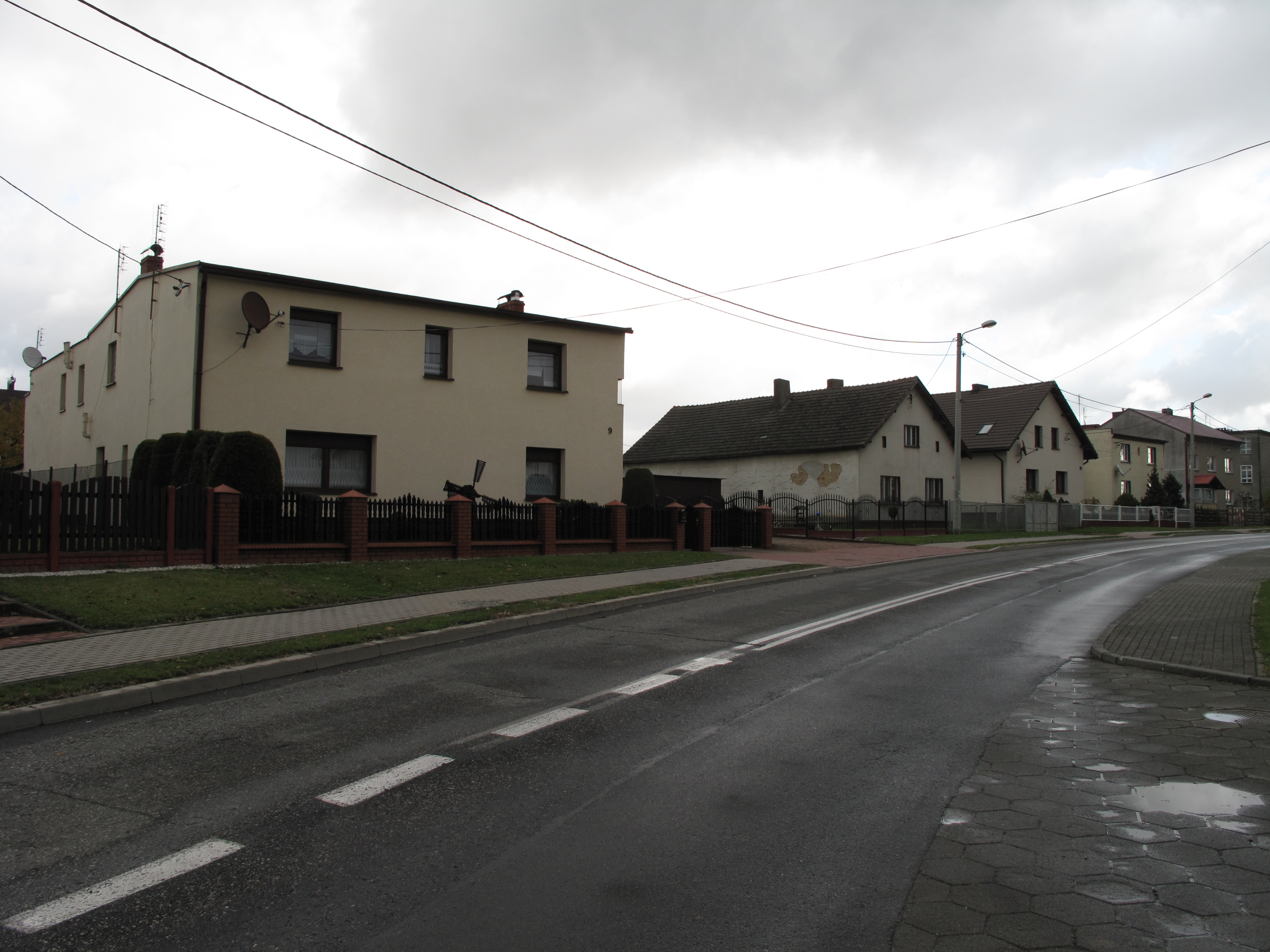
Road

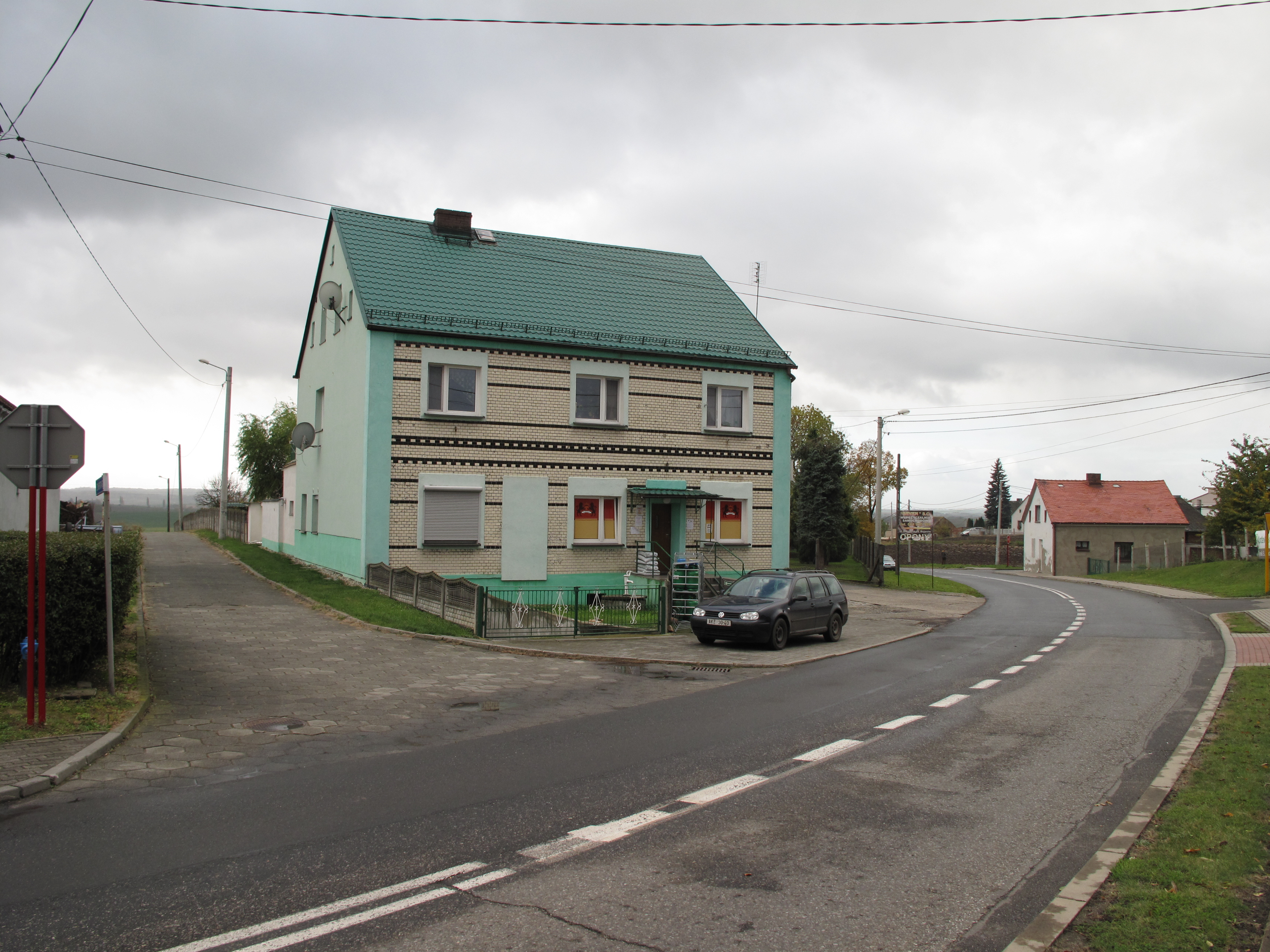
House
