= Pallottines =

Roman Catholic society of apostolic life

Society of the Catholic Apostolate
- The seal of the Society of the Catholic Apostolate
- Abbreviation: S.A.C.
- Nickname: Pallottines
- Formation: 4 April 1845; 181 years ago
- Founder: Saint Fr. Vincenzo Pallotti, S.A.C.
- Type: Society of Apostolic Life of Pontifical Right (for Men)
- Headquarters: Piazza San Vincenzo Pallotti 204, 00186 Roma, Italy
- Members: 2,328 members (includes 1,747 priests) (2020)
- Rector General: Fr. Zenon Hanas,SAC
- Motto: Latin: Caritas Christi urget nos English: The love of Christ impels us
- Parent organization: Catholic Church
- Website: www.sac.info

The Pallottines, officially named the Society of the Catholic Apostolate (Latin: Societas Apostolatus Catholici), abbreviated SAC, is a Society of Apostolic Life of Pontifical Right for men in the Roman Catholic Church, founded in 1835 by the Roman Catholic priest Saint Vincent Pallotti. Pallottines are part of the Union of Catholic Apostolate and are present in 45 countries on six continents. The Pallottines administer one of the largest churches in the world, the Basilica of Our Lady of Peace of Yamoussoukro in Côte d'Ivoire.

== History ==
Vincent Pallotti was born in Rome in 1795. Together with a group of associates and collaborators, he developed in the city of Rome a large structure of apostolic activity, which included assisting the poor, the sick, and the marginalized; founding orphanages, institutions of charity, and shelters; and ministering to soldiers, workers, students, and prisoners. The Society, as a community of priests and brothers, was founded in Rome by Pallotti in 1835.

Vincent Pallotti died on 22 January 1850, without having seen the full development of his work. His closest collaborators continued his mission, ensuring further development of the Society. Vincent Pallotti was beatified in 1950 and canonized on 20 January 1963 by Pope John XXIII.

== Apostolate ==
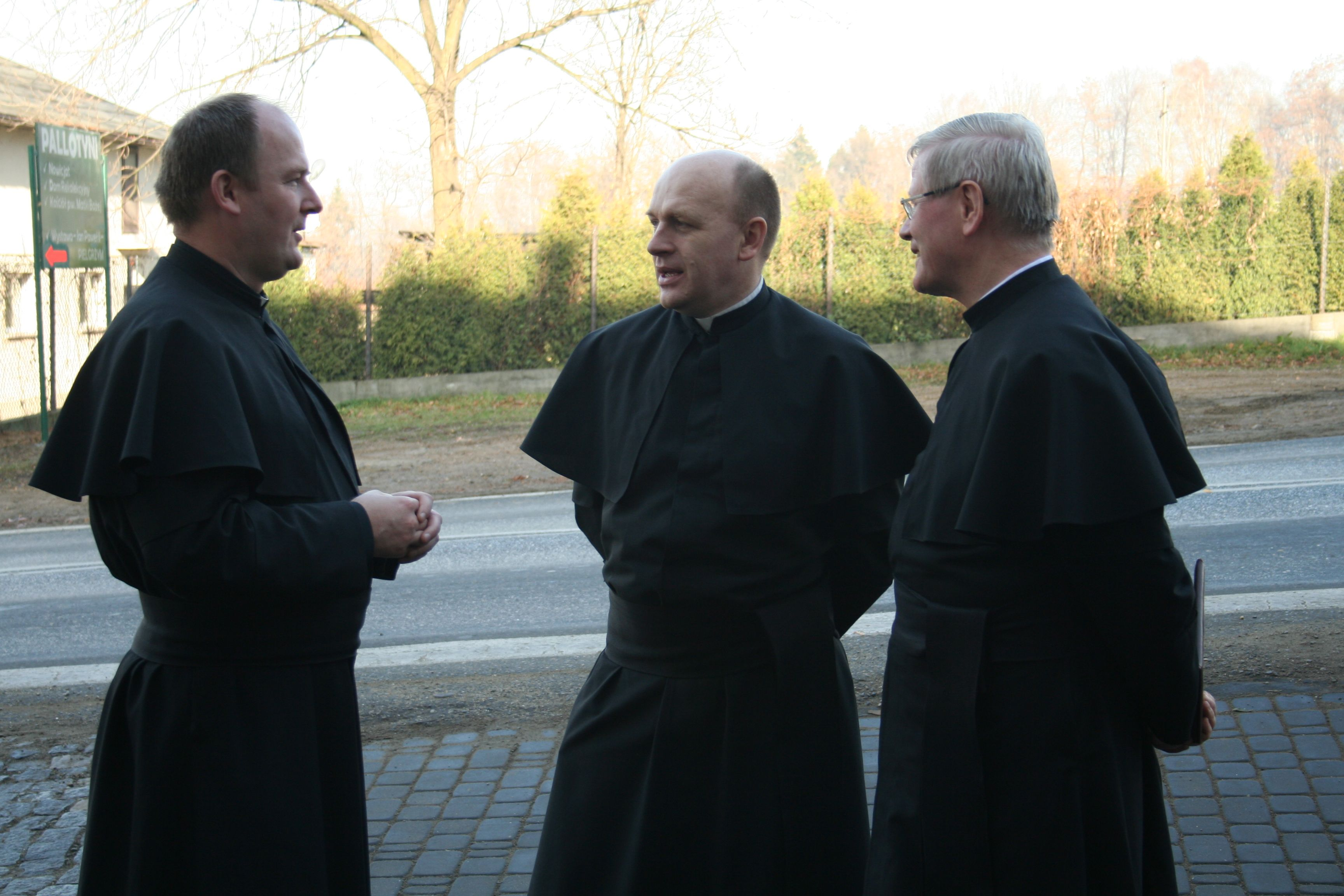
Pallottine fathers

The Pallottine Fathers and Brothers serve in over 40 countries.

Not long after the death of his wife, Marianne, in 1880, English poet Coventry Patmore contacted the Pallotines about establishing a church in Hastings. St Mary Star of the Sea Church opened on 2 July 1883 and as of 2019 is still served by the Pallottines.

The Pallottine mission to Kamerun was established in 1890 in the German colony of Kamerun, today's Cameroon. The Fathers opened a number of missions and schools until 1916, when with the Kamerun campaign of World War I, they relocated south to Spanish Guinea. After the war, the Pallottines were replaced by the French Holy Ghost Fathers. The Pallottines returned to Cameroon in 1964.

In the present day, the Pallottines have expanded their missionary apostolate to Korea, Taiwan and the Philippines. The Society conducts parishes, schools, missions, clinics, retreat houses, all types of charitable works, and the scientific Institute for Catholic Church Statistics in Poland. In 1915 the Society founded the St. Paulusheim Gymnasium in Bruchsal, Germany and in 1954 the Bishop Eustace Preparatory School in Pennsauken, New Jersey. The Pallottines also founded and direct the Catholic Apostolate Center in Washington, D.C., which develops programs to help strengthen the Society's mission.

== Irish Pallottines ==
The Irish Pallottine Province, now known as the Mother of Divine Love Province, came to Ireland in 1909. The Pallottine College in Thurles, Co. Tipperary, served as a seminary for the Irish Province with students also being trained in theology in the nearby St. Patrick's College, Thurles. The Irish Pallottines have served in England, Argentina, United States, Rome (Church of San Silvestro in Capite) and East Africa (Kenya, Uganda and Tanzania), as well as being entrusted with the running of two parishes, Corduff and Shankill, in the Archdiocese of Dublin. The provincial headquarters was in Argentina but moved to London in 1928, before moving to Dublin in 1978. As well as the Thurles College and Retreat Centre, the Headquarters and formation centre is in Dundrum, Dublin. The Irish Pallottine Community Cemetery is at St. Mary's, Cabra, Thurles. The Irish Bishop Séamus Freeman, S.A.C. 1944 – 2022, was a member of the Pallottine Order as was Bishop Patrick Winters, S.A.C. 1908 – 1994.

=== Provincials of Irish Pallotines ===
- Rev. William Hanly S.A.C.
- Rev. Patrick Dwyer S.A.C.
- Rev. John Fitzpatrick S.A.C.
- Rev. Eamonn Monson S.A.C.
- Rev. Derry Murphy S.A.C.

== Pallottine martyrs ==
Józef Jankowski was a Pallottine from Poland who was sent to Auschwitz during World War II. He was killed there after being beaten by a camp capo. Jankowski was beatified by Pope John Paul II in Poland in 1999. Jozef Stanek was also a Pallottine from Poland who was martyred during World War II.

Jorge Mario Cardinal Bergoglio, SJ, later Pope Francis, opened the cause in Argentina for beatification—the first step towards sainthood—for five members of the Pallottine community. The candidates for beatification are three priests and two seminarians killed by the military dictatorship in Argentina in 1976: Alfredo Leaden, Alfredo Kelly, Peter Duffau and seminarians Salvador Barbeito and Emilio Barletti.

== Saints, blesseds, and other holy people ==
Saints

- Vincenzo Pallotti (21 April 1795 – 22 January 1850), founder of the Society, canonized on 20 January 1963

Blesseds

- Józef Jankowski (17 November 1910 - 16 October 1941), priest martyred under the Nazi Occupation of Poland, beatified on 13 June 1999
- Józef Stanek (4 December 1916 - 23 September 1944), priest martyred under the Nazi Occupation of Poland, beatified on 13 June 1999
- Richard Henkes (26 May 1900 – 22 February 1945), priest martyred by the Nazis, beatified on 15 September 2019

Servants of God

- Peter Joseph Kentenich (16 November 1885 – 15 September 1968), German priest, theologian, educator, and founder and first Director of the Schoenstatt Movement; first Superior General of the Secular Institute of the Schoenstatt Fathers, declared as a Servant of God on 10 February 1975
- Gerhard Heinrich Vieter (13 February 1853 - 7 November 1914), Bishop of the Apostolic Vicariate of Cameroon, declared as a Servant of God on 3 June 2017
- Stanisław Szulmiński (10 July 1894 - 27 November 1941), martyr, declared as a Servant of God on 24 September 2002
- Franz Reinisch (1 February 1903 – 21 August 1942), killed for refusing to take the so-called Hitler oath, declared as a Servant of God in 2013
- Jan Szambelańczyk and 4 Companions (died between 2 July 1941 to 11 March 1945), Martyrs under the Nazi occupation of Poland, declared as Servants of God on 18 February 2003
- Alfredo Leaden and 4 Companions (died 4 July 1976), three priests and two seminarians martyred by military dictatorship in Argentina

== See also ==
- Religious institute (Catholic)
- Secular institute
- Vocational Discernment in the Catholic Church
- Union of Catholic Apostolate
