= Richard Henkes =

German Roman Catholic priest and professed member from the Pallottines

Blessed Richard Henkes SAC
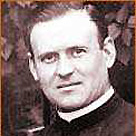
- c. 1940.

Martyr
- Born: 26 May 1900; Ruppach, Westerwaldkreis, German Empire
- Died: 22 February 1945 (aged 44); Dachau concentration camp, Germany
- Beatified: 15 September 2019, Limburg, Germany by Cardinal Kurt Koch
- Feast: 21 February

Richard Henkes (26 May 1900 – 22 February 1945) was a German Roman Catholic priest of the Society of the Catholic Apostolate (Pallottines). Henkes served as a teacher but was best known for his preaching abilities in the pulpit where he made strong-worded condemnations of Nazism and the actions the Nazis were said to have made. Henkes offered indirect assistance to the German Resistance during World War II and was one of the more vocal German priests to condemn Nazism. This often worried his superiors who believed that Henkes placed his schools at great risk. He was critical of the regime's murder of the disabled and other atrocities which forced the S.S. to arrest him. His first arrest in 1938 saw him released but his second arrest in 1943 saw him sent to the Dachau concentration camp. It was during that time that he befriended Josef Beran (future cardinal) who taught him the Czech language.

Henkes' cause for beatification gained interest not long after he died though waned in the following decades until around 2000 when formal requests were made to launch the cause. The cause began in 2002 and Henkes was titled as a Servant of God. He was declared Blessed on 15 September 2019.

== Life ==
Richard Henkes was born in mid-1900 in Ruppach-Goldhausen as one of eight children to a stonemason.

His father often worked abroad as a stonemason so religious instruction to the eight children fell to their mother who used to sprinkle each of them with holy water each night before the children went to bed. His teacher Hans gave Henkes good reports when he was at school. On one occasion a Pallottine priest who served in the Cameroon missions came to the parish where he spoke of his work. This enthralled Henkes who began desiring joining the missions himself.

Henkes entered the Pallottines in Limburg in 1919 not long after he completed his studies (passing his Abitur) under them which had begun earlier in Vallendar in 1912. He felt homesick when he moved to Vallendar but his friends there provided him with enough support to continue on with his studies. Henkes' spiritual director at this time was the Servant of God Joseph Kentenich. In 1918 he passed his exams in Montabaur before being summoned at that time to Griesheim and Darmstadt for service; he returned to Vallendar in late 1918.

Between his first vows in 1921 and his ordination he suffered from a spiritual crisis that he later resolved. He received his ordination to the priesthood on 6 June 1925 in Limburg from the local bishop Augustinus Kilian. Henkes became a teacher following his sacerdotal ordination and taught in Pallottine and Schoenstatt schools from 1926. From 1931 he served in Katscher and Frankenstein as well as in Branitz to teach and minister to the faithful. He became a noted preacher in the pulpit but was also known amongst girls and religious sisters as a noted retreat-master. His preaching never faltered when the Nazis were present during his sermons to observe him since he had been known for making criticisms against Nazism and the actions that the regime did. He criticized the Nazis for their killing disabled people and condemned murder and other atrocities.

Sometime around 1927 he began to demonstrate signs of exhaustion and so was sent to recuperate and regain his strength. But he was later sent to a hospital for evaluation in which doctors told him to rest. Henkes refused this which irritated his doctors who believed Henkes' excessive work would aggravate his condition. He was later diagnosed with tuberculosis for the lungs and was sent to recover in a sanatorium. His provincial superior wanted to send him to South Africa since he believed that the favorable climate would prove beneficial to Henkes' health. The doctors advised against his transfer due to the seriousness of his condition. In 1928 he recovered enough to the point that he could resume teaching.

The Nazis arrested Henkes on 7 March 1937 in Roppach following a sermon he made in which he denounced the Nazi regime. Henkes was to be hauled before a special court in Breslau but was released. But this did not make him exempt from future suspicion or observation. But he did collaborate to some extent with the German Resistance though had an indirect role in it. He continued his strong denouncements of the Nazis to a point that often concerned his superiors who worried for the schools that Henkes was teaching in. This was not due to his teaching methods or views on Nazism. But it was rather because his strong denouncements could jeopardize the schools themselves. The Nazis soon had enough of his critical statements and so arrested him on 8 April 1943 in Branitz for abusing the pulpit to make politicized statements. Henkes was imprisoned first in Ratibor and then on 10 July 1943 moved to the Dachau concentration camp where he was forced to do manual labour on the S.S. plantation. In the camp he befriended the future cardinal Josef Beran. The latter taught Henkes the basics of the Czech language since Henkes wanted to master it in order to use it to speak with Czech people.

In the second-half of 1944 he served as a canteen-keeper for the inmates in Block XVII. Henkes volunteered in December 1944 to work with patients in Block XVII who had contracted typhus. He became infected with the disease himself due to prolonged exposure to the ill. Henkes died around eight weeks or so later in the camp. His remains were cremated but his ashes were smuggled out in secret so as to receive a proper burial on 7 June 1945 in Limburg; his ashes were then transferred in 1990 to another location in Limburg.

== Beatification ==
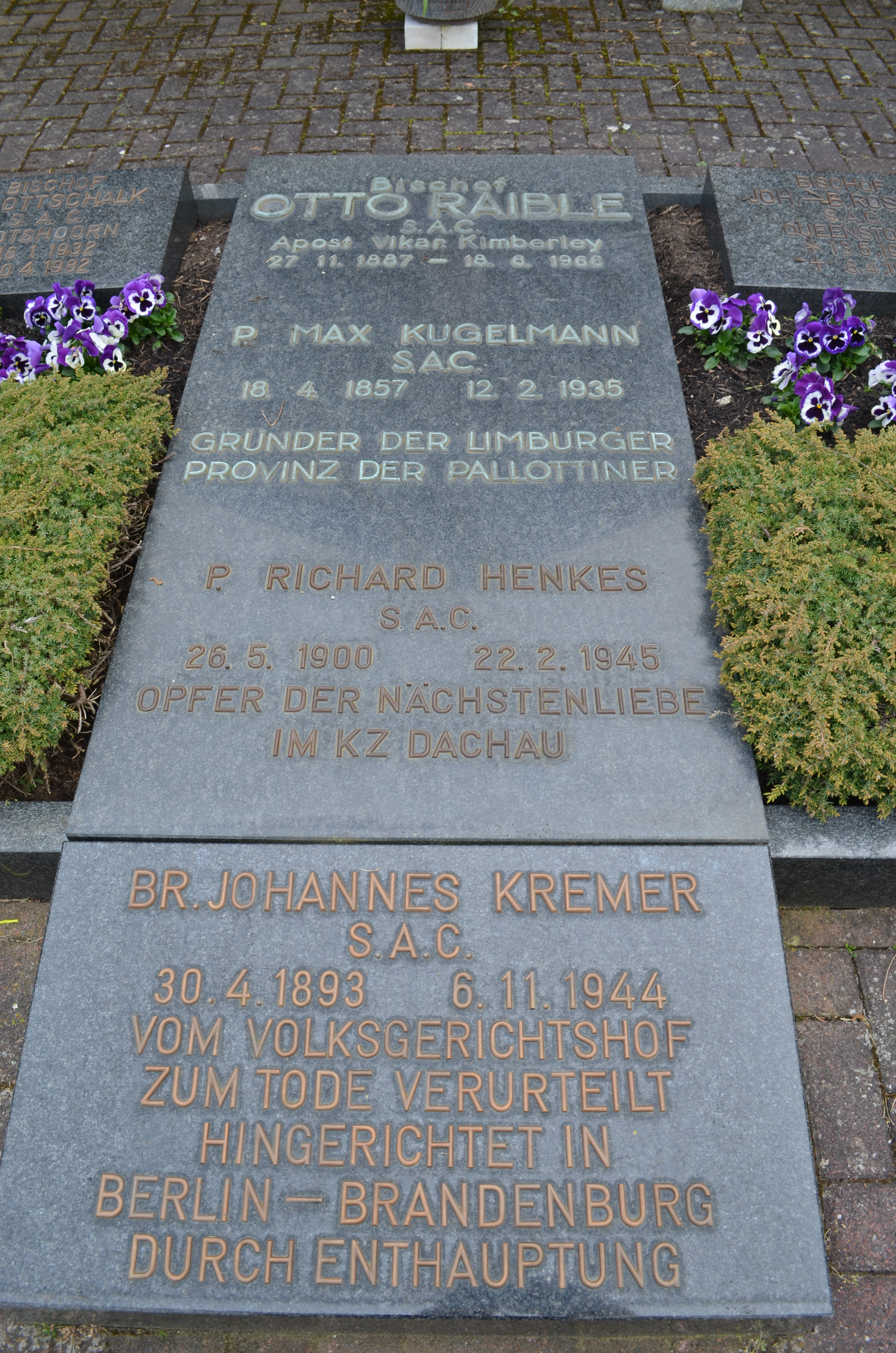
Henkes' grave (third from the top) in Limburg.

The order's General Chapter in Rome in 1947 expressed their favor in launching a beatification process for Henkes and several other priests slain during the war. But the beatification and canonization of the order's founder Vincenzo Pallotti caused the order to almost forget about Henkes' potential cause due to the order's work with the Pallotti cause. In 1980 former inmates from Dachau who knew Henkes met with Pope John Paul II in Fulda (during the pope's apostolic visit) and mentioned Henkes to him; that same group of priests in 1995 applied to the Bishop of Limburg Franz Kamphaus and asked for the cause to be opened. But the Pallottines themselves had not made a decision on the cause but decided to approve it due to later developments and support. The Bishop of Plzeň (in the Czech Republic) sent a letter on 17 January 2001 to the Pallottines indicating his support to the cause if it were to be opened.

The diocesan process was launched in Limburg on 25 May 2003 and concluded on 23 January 2007. The investigation was handed over to the Congregation for the Causes of Saints who validated the process on 13 March 2009. Pope Francis confirmed on 21 December 2018 that Henkes would be beatified; it was celebrated in the Limburg Cathedral on 15 September 2019 with Cardinal Kurt Koch presiding over the celebration on the pope's behalf. The postulator for this cause is the Pallottine priest Jan Korycki.
