= Pietraszyn =

- Village
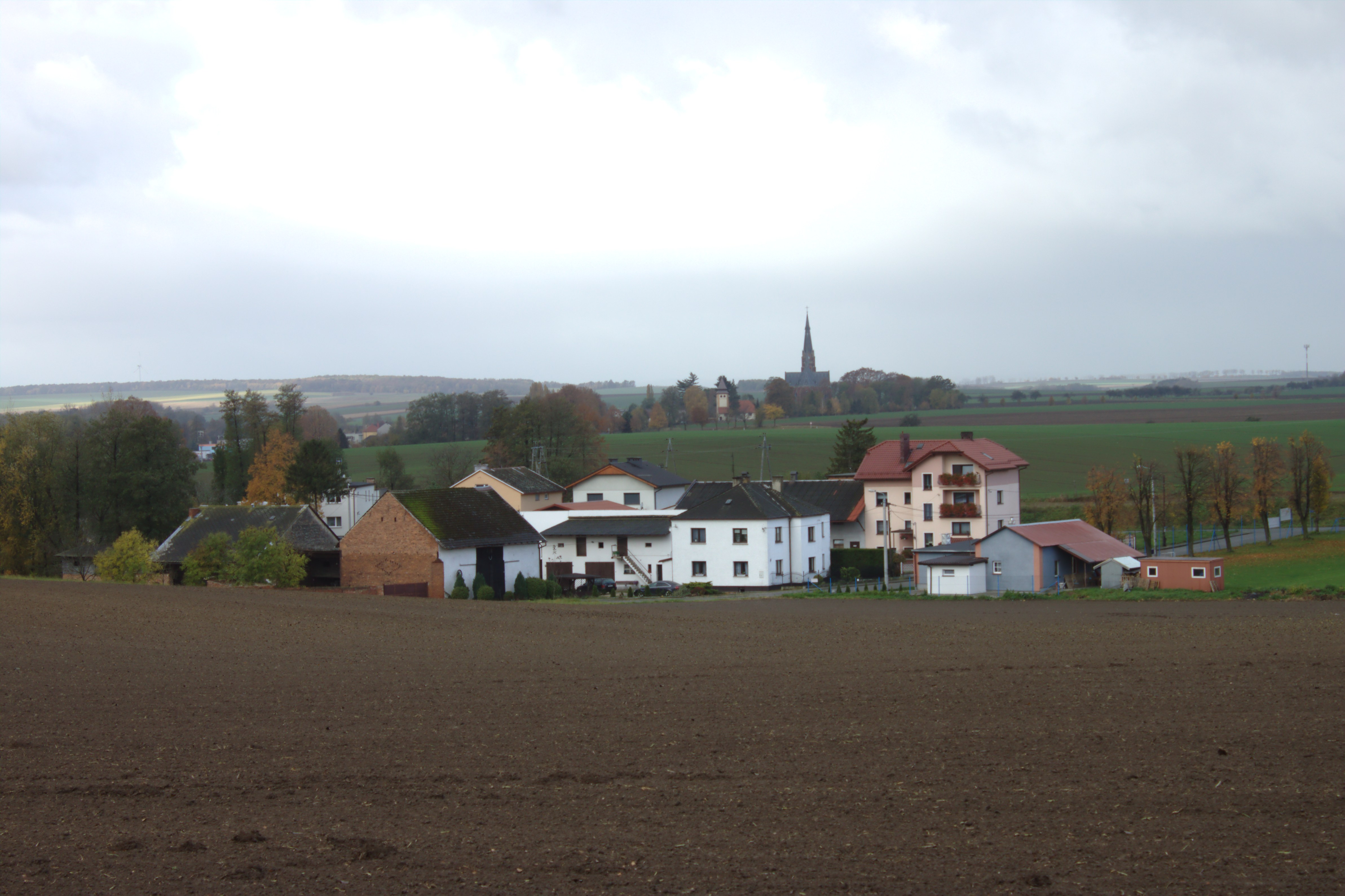
- Houses

- Location within Poland
- Coordinates: 50°2′N 18°5′E
- Country: Poland
- Voivodeship: Silesian
- County: Racibórz
- Gmina: Krzanowice

Pietraszyn [pjɛˈtraʂɨn] is a village in the administrative district of Gmina Krzanowice, within Racibórz County, Silesian Voivodeship, in southern Poland, close to the Czech border.

== Gallery ==
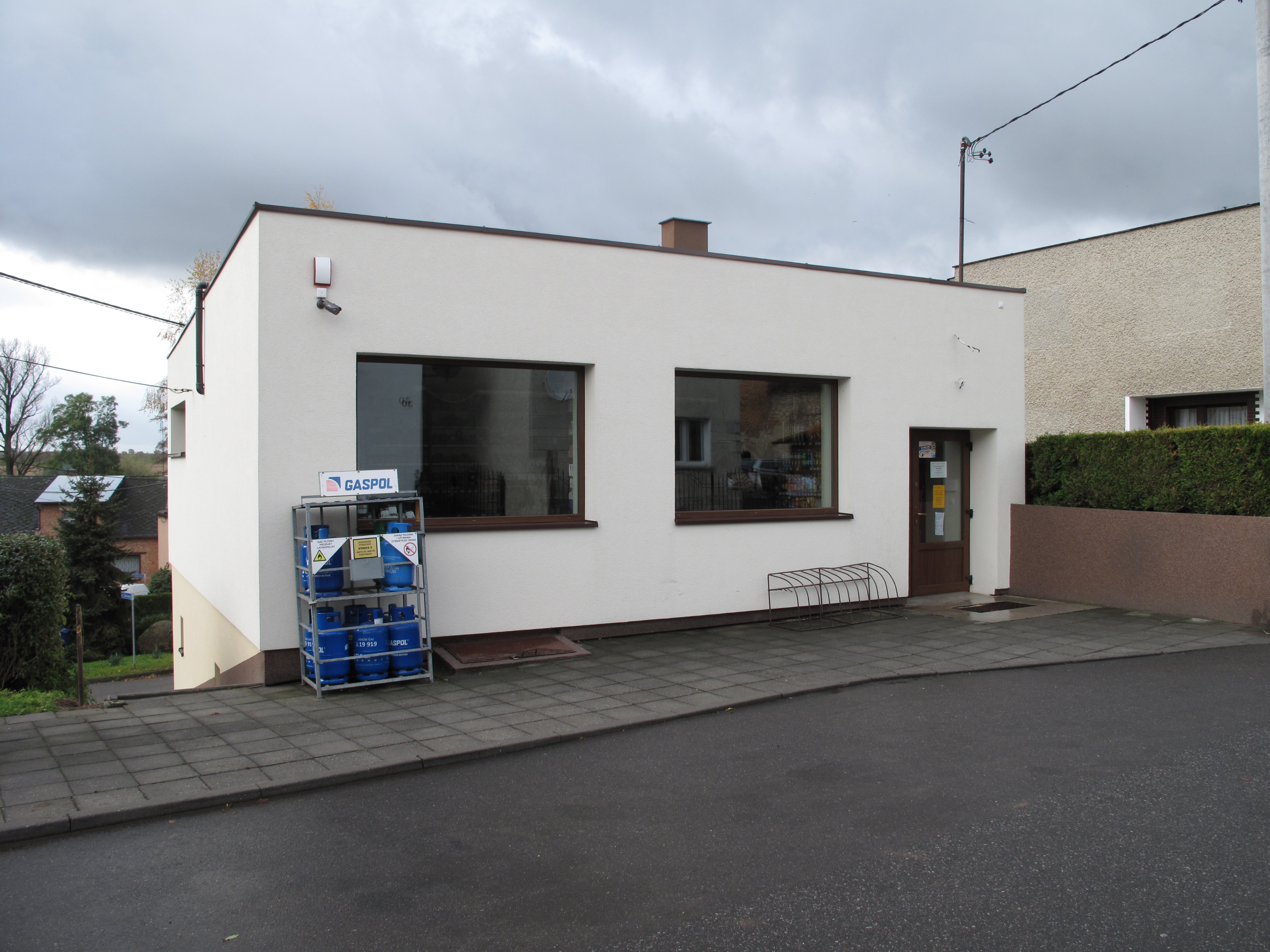
Shop

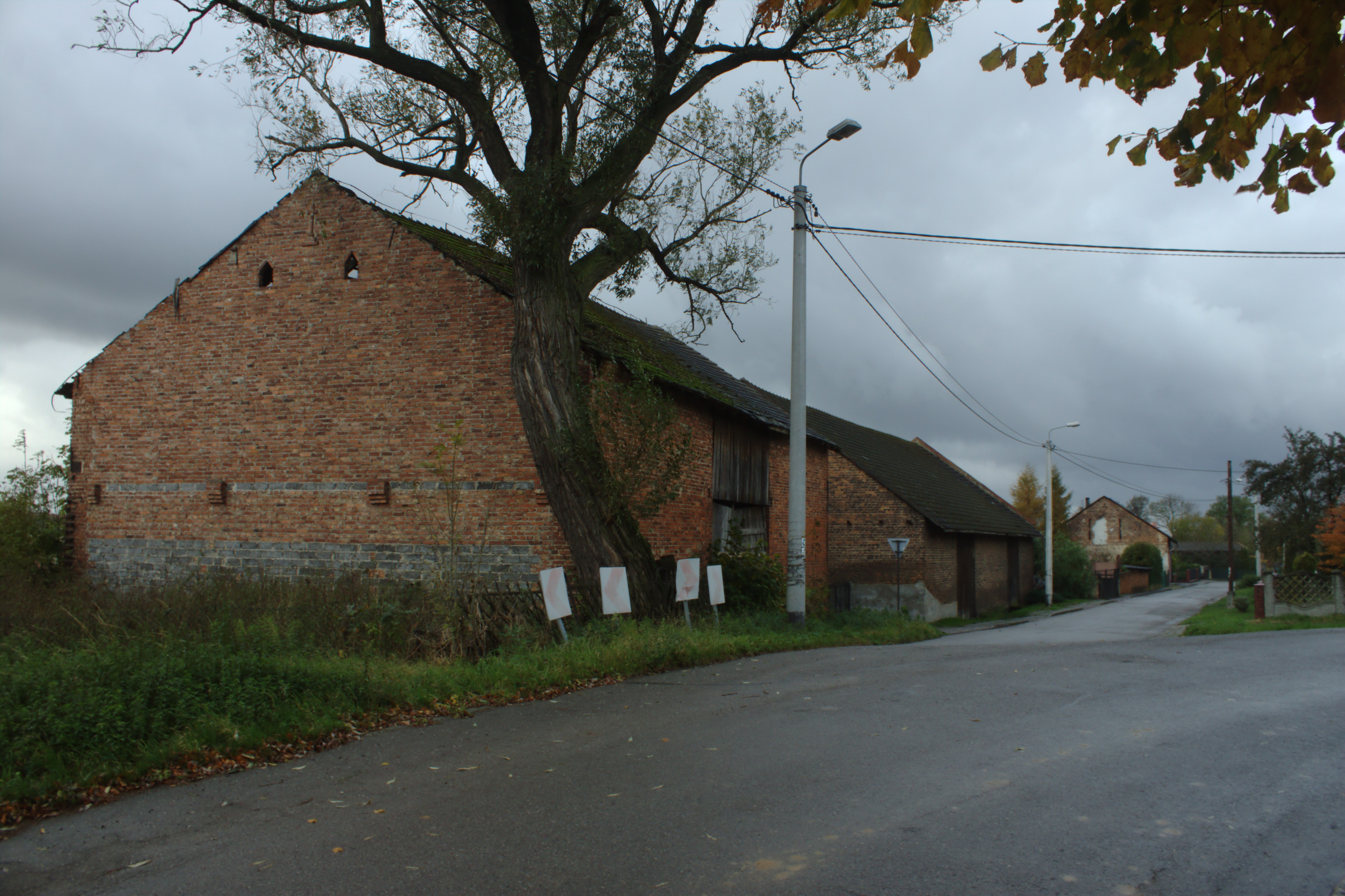
Barns

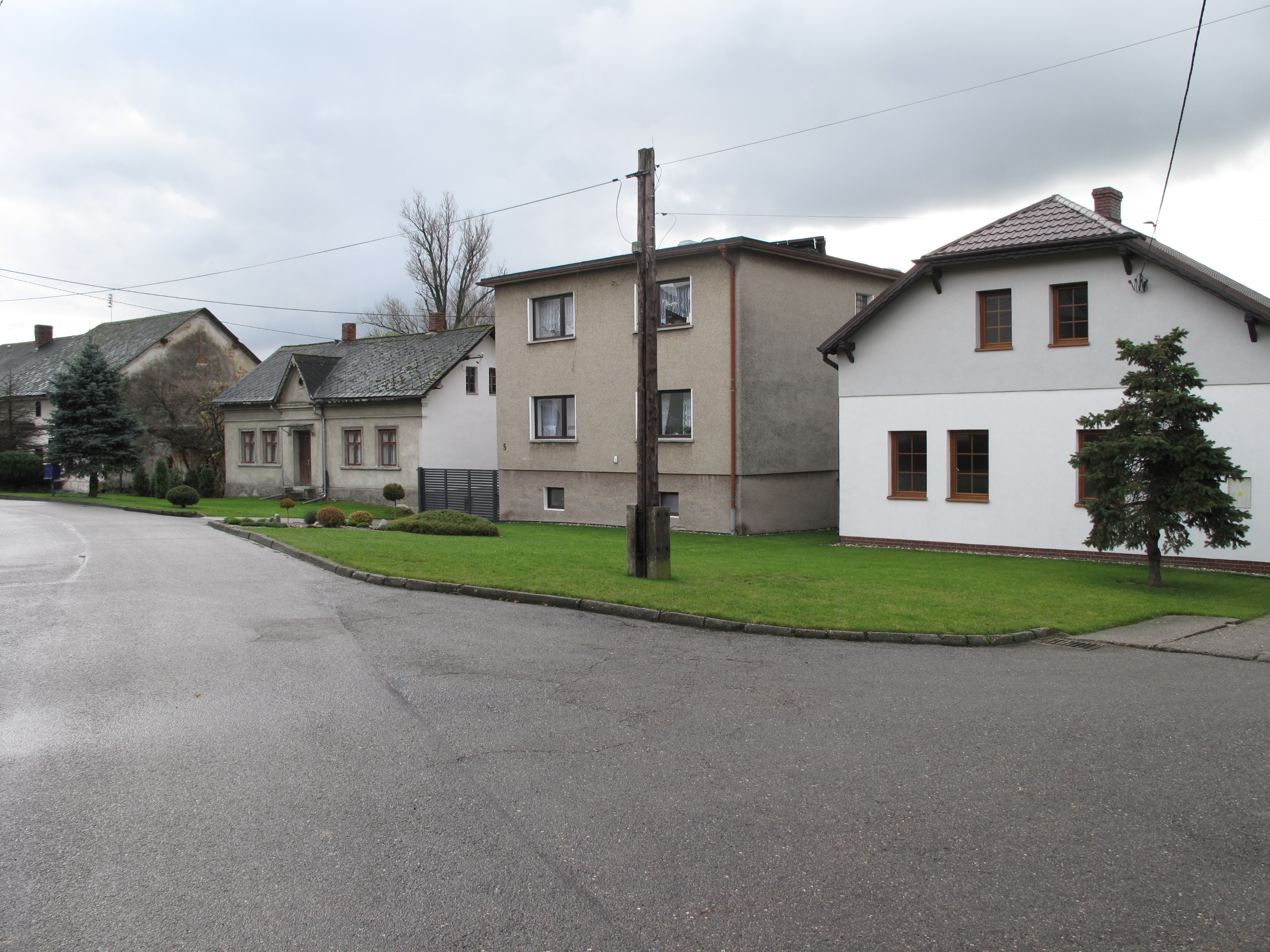
Houses
