= Catholic resistance to Nazi Germany =

Catholic Resistance to Nazism

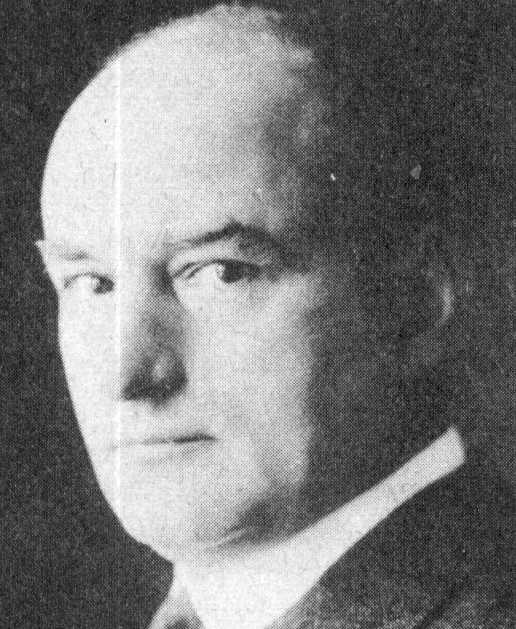
Erich Klausener

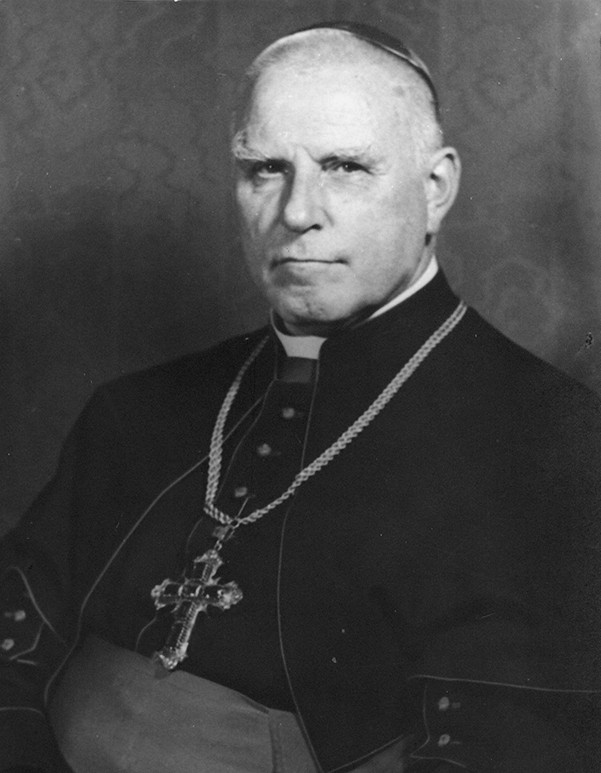
Bishop Clemens August von Galen of Münster

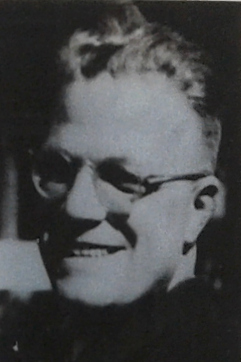
Alfred Delp SJ

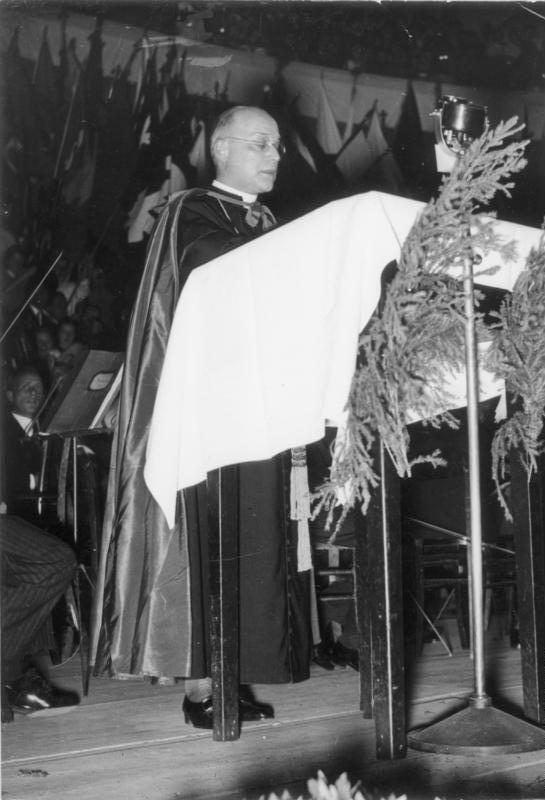
Konrad von Preysing of Berlin

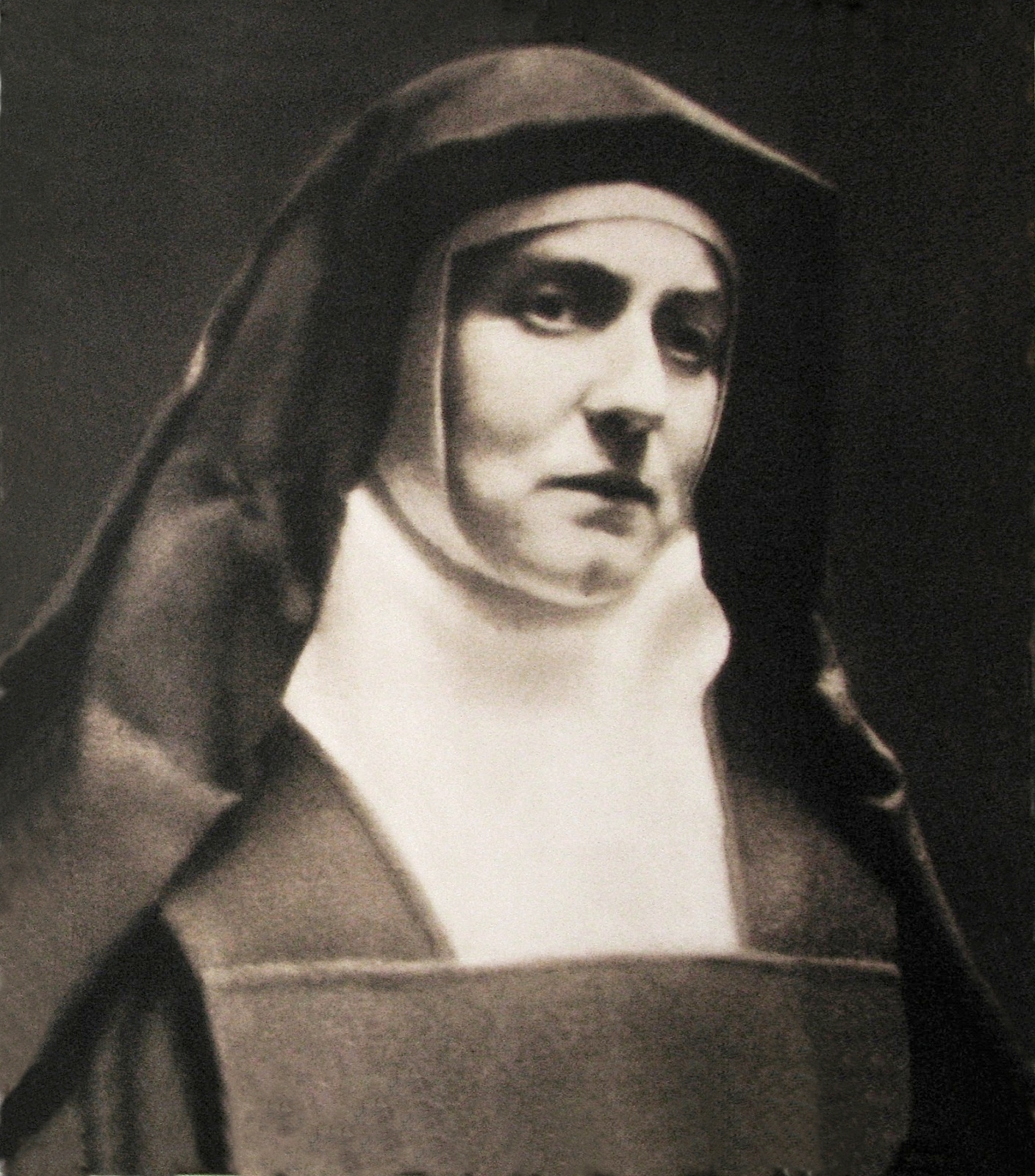
Saint Teresa Benedicta of the Cross (Edith Stein)

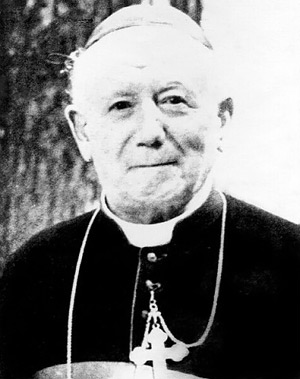
Jules-Géraud Saliège of Toulouse

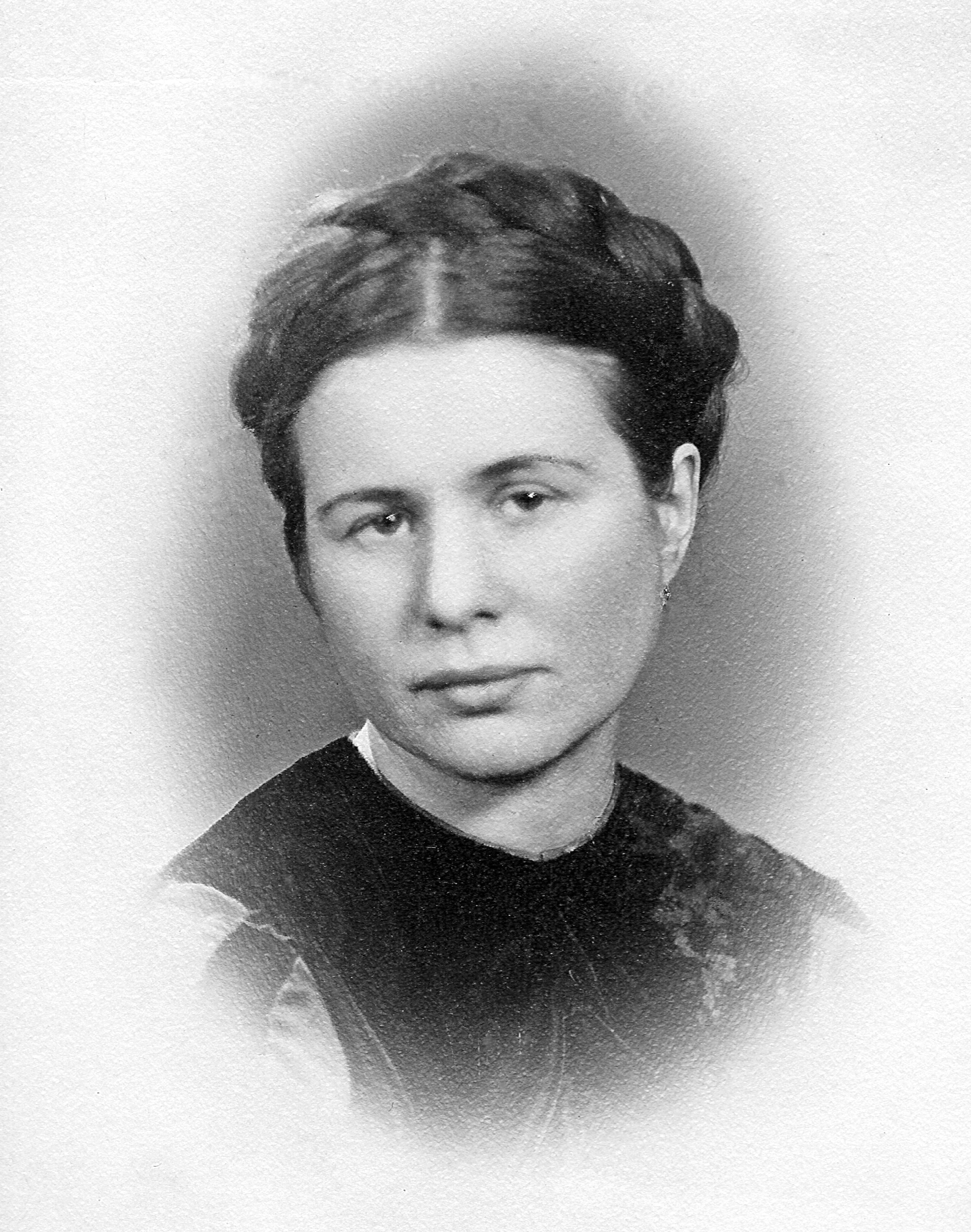
Irena Sendlerowa

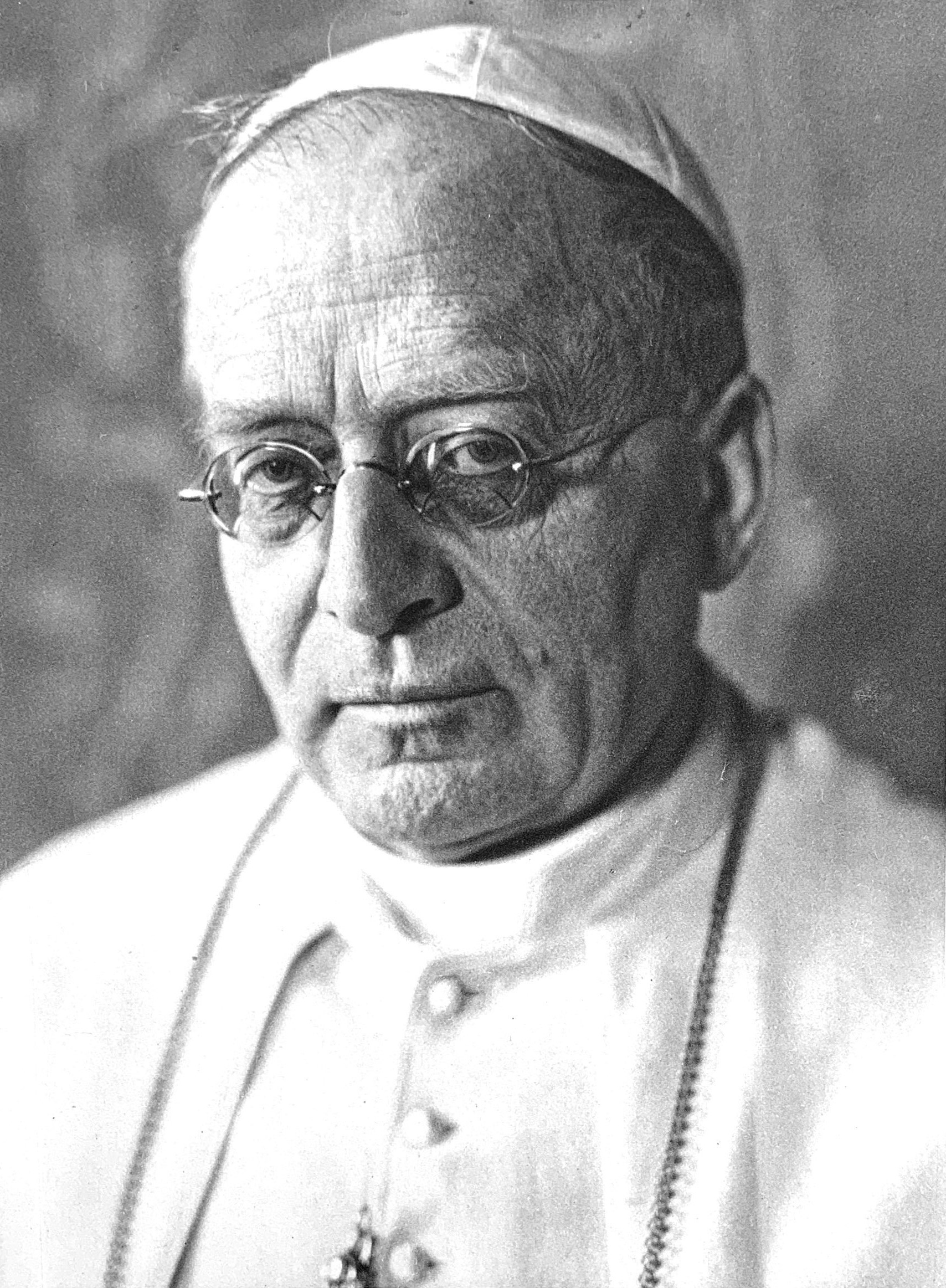
Pius XI

Catholic resistance to Nazi Germany was a component of German resistance to Nazism and of Resistance during World War II. The role of the Catholic Church during the Nazi years remains a matter of much contention. From the outset of Nazi rule in 1933, issues emerged which brought the church into conflict with the regime and persecution of the church led Pope Pius XI to denounce the policies of the Nazi Government in the 1937 papal encyclical Mit brennender Sorge. His successor Pius XII faced the war years and provided intelligence to the Allies. Catholics fought on both sides in World War II and neither the Catholic nor Protestant churches as institutions were prepared to openly oppose the Nazi State.

An estimated one-third of German Catholic priests faced some form of reprisal from authorities and thousands of Catholic clergy and religious were sent to concentration camps. 400 Germans were among the 2,579 Catholic priests imprisoned in the clergy barracks at Dachau. While the head German bishop generally avoided confronting the regime, other bishops such as Preysing, Frings and Galen developed a Catholic critique of aspects of Nazism. Galen led Catholic protest against Nazi "euthanasia".

Catholic resistance to mistreatment of Jews in Germany was generally limited to fragmented and largely individual efforts. But in every country under German occupation, priests played a major part in rescuing Jews. Israeli historian Pinchas Lapide estimated that Catholic rescue of Jews amounted to somewhere between 700,000 and 860,000 people and credited that to Pope Pius XII. – though the figure is contested. The martyrs Maximilian Kolbe, Giuseppe Girotti and Bernhard Lichtenberg were among those killed in part for aiding Jews. Among the notable Catholic networks to rescue Jews and others were Hugh O'Flaherty's "Rome Escape Line," at the behest of Pope Pius XII, the Assisi Network and Poland's Żegota.

Relations between the Axis governments and the church varied. Bishops such as the Netherlands' Johannes de Jong, Belgium's Jozef-Ernest van Roey and France's Jules-Géraud Saliège issued major denunciations of Nazi treatment of Jews. Convents and nuns like Margit Slachta and Matylda Getter also led resistance. Vatican diplomats like Giuseppe Burzio in Slovakia, Filippo Bernardini in Switzerland and Angelo Roncalli in Turkey saved thousands. The nuncio to Budapest, Angelo Rotta, and Bucharest, Andrea Cassulo, have been recognised by Yad Vashem in Israel. The nationalist regimes in Slovakia and Croatia were pro-clerical, while in Slovene, Czech, Austrian and Polish areas annexed by Nazi Germany, repression of the church was at its most severe and the Catholic religion was integral to much Polish resistance.

Author Klaus Scholder writes: "There was no Catholic resistance in Germany, there were only Catholics who resisted." The Vatican policy meant that the Pope never challenged Catholics to side either with Nazism or with Catholic morality, and Pius XII was so adamant that Bolshevism represented the most terrible threat to the world that he remarked "Germany are a great nation who, in their fight against Bolshevism, are bleeding not only for their friends but also for the sake of their present enemies." In a letter of autumn 1941 Pius XII wrote to Bishop Preysing, "We emphasise that, because the Church in Germany is dependent upon your public behaviour...in public declarations you are duty bound to exercise restraint" and "requires(d) you and your colleagues not to protest."

== Background ==
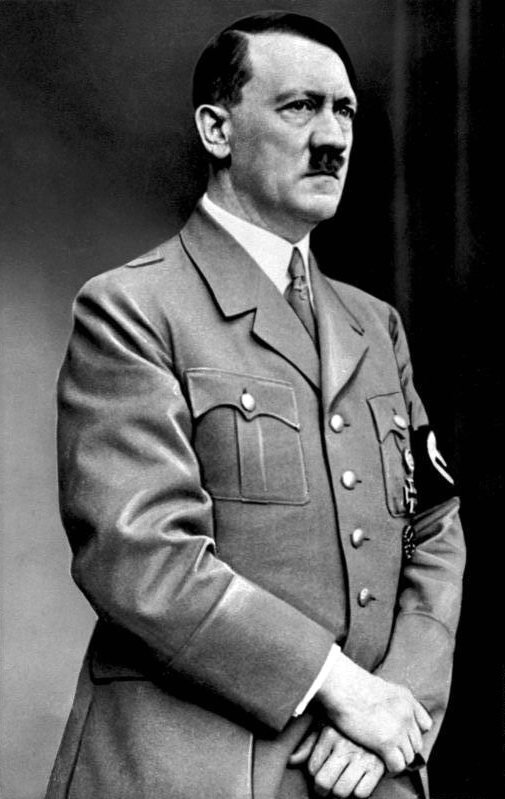
The Nazi dictator Adolf Hitler was anti-clerical and hostile to the teachings of the Catholic Church.

=== Nazis rise to power ===
In the 1920s and 1930s, Catholic leaders made a number of forthright attacks on Nazi ideology and the main Christian opposition to Nazism had come from the Catholic Church. German bishops were hostile to the emerging movement and energetically denounced its "false doctrines". They warned Catholics against Nazi racism and some dioceses banned membership of the Nazi Party, while the Catholic press criticized the Nazi movement. Figures like Cardinal Michael von Faulhaber, appalled by the totalitarianism, neopaganism, and racism of the Nazi movement, had contributed to the failure of the Nazi Munich Putsch of 1923.

The Nazis disliked universities, intellectuals and the Catholic and Protestant churches. Hamerow writes that many Nazis suspected Catholics of insufficient patriotism, or even of disloyalty to the Fatherland, and of serving the interests of "sinister alien forces". Various historians surmise that the long-term plan of the Nazis was to de-Christianise Germany after final victory in the war. (Note: Notes on Hitler's plan to de-Christianise Germany: "Once the war was over, [Hitler] promised himself, he would root out and destroy the influence of the Christian churches, but until then he would be circumspect."; "By the latter part of the decade of the Thirties, church officials were well aware that the ultimate aim of Hitler and other Nazis was the total elimination of Catholicism and of the Christian religion. Since the overwhelming majority of Germans were either Catholic or Protestant. this goal had to be a long-term rather than a short-term Nazi objective."; "[the Nazis planned to] de-Christianise Germany after the final victory".; "There is no doubt that in the long run Nazi leaders such as Hitler and Himmler intended to eradicate Christianity just as ruthlessly as any other rival ideology, even if in the short term they had to be content to make compromises with it."; "Had the Nazis won the war their ecclesiastical policies would have gone beyond those of the German Christians, to the utter destruction of both the Protestant and the Catholic Church."; "And even fewer paused to reflect that under the leadership of Rosenberg, Bormann and Himmler, who were backed by Hitler, the Nazi regime intended eventually to destroy Christianity in Germany, if it could, and substitute the old paganism of the early tribal Germanic gods and the new paganism of the Nazi extremists."; "The objective was to either destroy Christianity and restore the German gods of antiquity or to turn Jesus into an Aryan."; "It seems no exaggeration to insist that the greatest challenge the Nazis had to face was their effort to eradicate Christianity in Germany or at least to subjugate it to their general world outlook."; The Nazis sought "to eradicate Christianity in Germany root and branch."; "Consequently, it was Hitler's long range goal to eliminate the churches once he had consolidated control over his European empire.") Nazi ideology could not accept an autonomous establishment, whose legitimacy did not spring from the government, and the Nazis desired the subordination of the church to the state. In his history of the German Resistance, Hamerow wrote:

The Catholic Church... had generally viewed the Nazi Party with fear and suspicion. It had felt threatened by a radical ultranationalist ideology that regarded the papacy as a sinister, alien institution, that opposed denominational separatism in education and culture, and that at times appeared to promote a return to Nordic paganism. The establishment of the Third Reich seemed to portend the coming of a bitter conflict between church and state.

— Theodore S. Hamerow, On the Road to the Wolf's Lair: German Resistance to Hitler

The Centre Party and Hitler

The German Centre Party (Zentrum) was a lay Catholic-aligned political party that had been a force in Weimar politics and competed against the Nazis through the 1920s and 1930s for parliamentary representation. In the lead up to the Nazi takeover, Catholic regions stayed largely loyal to Zentrum and did not vote Nazi. Following the Wall Street crash of 1929, greatest gains for the Nazis came in the Protestant, rural towns of the North. Nazis and Communists pledged to eliminate democracy and secured over 50% of Reichstag seats.

A middle class liberal party strong enough to block the Nazis did not exist; the Centre Party was preoccupied defending its own particular interests. Requiring the votes of the Centre Party and Conservatives, Hitler told the Reichstag on 23 March that Positive Christianity was the "unshakeable foundation of the moral and ethical life of our people", and promised not to threaten the churches or the institutions of the Republic if granted plenary powers. Employing negotiation and intimidation, the Nazis called on the Reichstag to vote for the Enabling Act on 24 March 1933. Zentrum, having obtained promises of non-interference in religion, joined with Conservatives in voting for the Act (only the Social Democrats voted against).

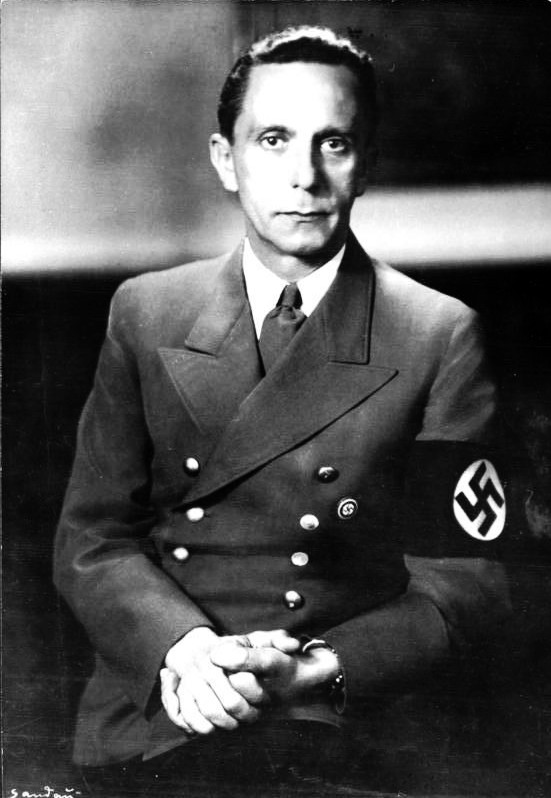
The Nazi propaganda minister, Joseph Goebbels, among the most aggressive anti-clerical Nazis, wrote that there was "an insoluble opposition between the Christian and a heroic-German world view".

=== Church Struggle commences ===
When the Nazis won power in 1933, Catholics were apprehensive and a threatening, though initially sporadic persecution of the Catholic Church commenced. Leading Nazis like Goebbels and Hitler's war-time deputy Martin Bormann saw the conflict with the churches as a priority concern, and anti-church and anti-clerical sentiments were strong among grassroots party activists. But Catholics constituted a third of the population, and Hitler was prepared to restrain the full extent of his anti-clerical ambitions out of political considerations, intending instead to have a showdown after the war. Hitler moved quickly to eliminate Political Catholicism, rounding up thousands of functionaries of the Bavarian People's Party and Centre Party, before outlawing non-Nazi political parties.

Concordat signed and breached

Amid continuing molestation of its clergy and organisations, the church was anxious to reach agreement securing its rights in Germany with the new Reich Government. Conservative Vice-Chancellor Papen negotiated the Reich concordat with the Holy See which guaranteed the Church's rights in Germany, but prohibited clergy from participating in politics. Clerical opposition diminished following the agreement, but Hitler had a blatant disregard for the concordat, which he incorporated into steps to suppress the church in Germany. The Nazis immediately breached the treaty, interfering with Catholic schooling, youth groups, workers' clubs and cultural societies, instigating sterilisation laws, and targeting clergy, nuns and lay leaders, leading to thousands of arrests over the ensuing years, often on trumped up charges of currency smuggling or "immorality":

It quickly became clear that [Hitler] intended to imprison the Catholics, as it were, in their own churches. They could celebrate mass and retain their rituals as much as they liked, but they could have nothing at all to do with German society otherwise. Catholic schools and newspapers were closed, and a propaganda campaign against the Catholics was launched.

— Anton Gill, An Honourable Defeat

Catholics targeted

In the night of the long knives purge of 1934, Erich Klausener, the head of Catholic Action, was assassinated by the Gestapo. Adalbert Probst, national director of the Catholic Youth Sports Association, Fritz Gerlich, editor of Munich's Catholic weekly and Edgar Jung, one of the authors of the Marburg speech, were among the other high-profile Catholic opposition figures targeted for assassination in the purge.

The Nazi official philosopher Alfred Rosenberg's 1930 book Myth of the 20th Century had nominated Christianity and Catholicism as one of the enemies of Nazism. The church put the book the Index Librorum Prohibitorum in 1934 for scorning and rejecting "all dogmas of the Catholic Church, indeed the very fundamentals of the Christian religion".

Goebbels believed that there was an "insoluble opposition" between the Christian and Nazi outlooks, and became one of the leaders of the persecution of the clergy. In his 1936 campaign against the monasteries and convents, the authorities charged 276 members of religious orders with the offence of "homosexuality".

Rosenberg and Bormann also actively collaborated in the Nazi program to eliminate church influence – a program which included the abolition of religious services in schools; the confiscation of religious property; circulating anti-religious material to soldiers; and the closing of theological faculties. Hitler feared the idealism of Christians. In the Nazi security forces, Reinhard Heydrich and Heinrich Himmler wanted to suppress "political churches", such as Lutheran and Catholic clergy who opposed the Hitler regime.

By 1940, a dedicated clergy barracks had been established by the Nazis at Dachau Concentration Camp. Catholic schools in Germany were phased out by 1939 and Catholic press by 1941. With the expansion of the war in the East from 1941, there came also an expansion of the regime's attack on the church. Monasteries and convents were targeted and expropriation of church properties surged.

== Within Germany ==
=== Foundations ===
Though neither the Catholic nor Protestent churches as institutions were prepared to openly oppose the Nazi State, the churches provided the earliest and most enduring centres of systematic opposition to Nazi policies, and Christian morality and the anti-church policies of the Nazis motivated many German resistors and provided impetus for the "moral revolt" of individuals in their efforts to overthrow Hitler. From the outset of Nazi rule in 1933, issues emerged which brought the Catholic church into conflict with the regime, and the historian Wolf cites events such as the July Plot of 1944 as having been "inconceivable without the spiritual support of church resistance". The German Opposition saw National Socialism as standing in "radical opposition to the Western, Christian tradition". Hoffmann writes that, from the beginning:

[The Catholic Church] could not silently accept the general persecution, regimentation or oppression, nor in particular the sterilization law of summer 1933. Over the years until the outbreak of war Catholic resistance stiffened until finally its most eminent spokesman was the Pope himself with his encyclial Mit brennender Sorge ... of 14 March 1937, read from all German Catholic pulpits. Clemens August Graf von Galen, Bishop of Münster, was typical of the many fearless Catholic speakers. In general terms, therefore, the churches were the only major organisations to offer comparatively early and open resistance: they remained so in later years.

— Peter Hoffmann, The History of the German Resistance 1933–1945

Ernst Wolf wrote that some credit must be given to the resistance of the churches, for providing "moral stimulus and guidance for the political Resistance ...". Virtually all of the military conspirators in the July Plot were religious men. Among the social democrat political conspirators, the Christian influence was also strong, though humanism also played a significant foundational role – and among the wider circle there were other political, military and nationalist motivations at play. The Kreisau leader Helmuth James Graf von Moltke declared in one of his final letters before execution that the essence of the July revolt was "outrage of the Christian conscience". The "Declaration of Government" that was to be broadcast following the coup on 20 July 1944 appealed unambiguously to Christian sensibility:

The shattered freedom of spirit, conscience, faith and opinion will be restored. The churches will once again be given the right to work for their confessions. In future they will exist quite separately from the state ... The working of the state is to be inspired, both in word and deed by the Christian outlook ..."

— Intended "Broadcast of Government" of the 1944 July Plot conspirators.

=== Limitations ===
The German Episcopate had various disagreements with the Nazi government, but it never declared an official sanction of the various attempts to overthrow the Hitler regime. The German bishops hoped for a quid pro quo that would protect Catholic schools, organisations, publications and religious observance. The Vatican too persisted in seeking to maintain a "legal modus vivendi" with the regime.

Clergy in the German Resistance had some independence from the state apparatus, and could thus criticise it, while not being close enough to the centre of power to take steps to overthrow it. "Clerical resistors", wrote Theodore S. Hamerow, could "indirectly at least, articulate political dissent in the guise of pastoral stricture", but the problem for them lay in determining how far they should go in their criticism: "Should they confine themselves to religious and moral issues or should they deal with political and racial issues as well ...". Faced with such questions, the German clergy generally determined that their first duty lay in the protection of their own church and its members, remaining within the limits of formal legality. Thus during the early years of Nazi Germany, clerical dissenters usually spoke out not against the established system, but "only against specific policies that it had mistakenly adopted and that it should therefore properly correct".

Before moving toward resistance, German Catholics and Protestants were also faced with overcoming nationalist sentiment, and an instinct to respect authority which was the inheritance of their religious and national outlooks. In predominantly Protestant Germany, many Catholics were determined to prove that they were "good Germans" too, and avoid the trauma of another Kulturkampf. Thus when Bishop August von Galen of Münster delivered his famous 1941 denunciations of Nazi euthanasia and the lawlessness of the Gestapo, he also said that the church had never sought the overthrow of the regime. Yet from the early stages of Nazism, the Nazis moved early against the church's organisational interests – attacking Catholic schools and the Catholic press.

Hastings wrote that the early Nazi movement founded in Munich was essentially Catholic in religious orientation with Catholic student groups being influential in the founding of the movement and Catholic priests providing spiritual guidance. The events surrounding the Beer Hall Putsch in 1923 caused a rift between Catholic and Protestant members and thereafter the movement became predominantly Protestant. Archbishop Bertram sought to join the Nazi Party in 1932 with Archbishop Groeber joining the SS as a promotive member in 1933 and Bishop Hudal helping Nazi war criminals to escape after the war. (Note: "from the time Hitler came to power all the German bishops began declaring their appreciation of the important natural values of race and purity. This led German Catholics to dutifully obey and forget the warnings of the Bishops regarding immoral means in the defence of ones race".)

According to Kershaw, the German church leadership expended considerable energies in opposing government interference in the churches and "attempts to ride roughshod over Christian doctrine and values", but this vigour, was not matched against all areas of "Nazi barbarism". Thus for example, what protests the bishops did make regarding anti-Jewish policies, tended to be by way of private letters to government ministers. Kershaw wrote that, while the "detestation of Nazism was overwhelming within the Catholic Church", it did not preclude church leaders approving of areas of the regime's policies, particularly where Nazism "blended into 'mainstream' national aspirations" – like support for "patriotic" foreign policy or war aims, obedience to state authority (where this did not contravene divine law); and destruction of atheistic Marxism and Soviet Bolshevism. Traditional Christian anti-Judaism was "no bulwark" against Nazi biological antisemitism, wrote Kershaw, and on these issues "the churches as institutions felt on uncertain grounds". Opposition was generally left to fragmented and largely individual efforts.

Historian Karl Dietrich Bracher has called 'the idea that the Catholic Church almost universally opposed Nazism, 'as questionable as the contrary thesis of a Communist mass movement against Hitler', and attributed the Centre Party's paralysis to Catholicism's 'flirtation with the new regime'. Mary Fulbrook wrote that when politics encroached on the church, Catholics were prepared to resist, but that the record was otherwise patchy and uneven, and that, with notable exceptions, "it seems that, for many Germans, adherence to the Christian faith proved compatible with at least passive acquiescence in, if not active support for, the Nazi dictatorship". Pinchas Lapide wrote that in 1939 close to half the population of the Greater German Reich was Catholic and despite pressure to leave 22.7% of the SS were Catholics.

=== Institutional resistance ===
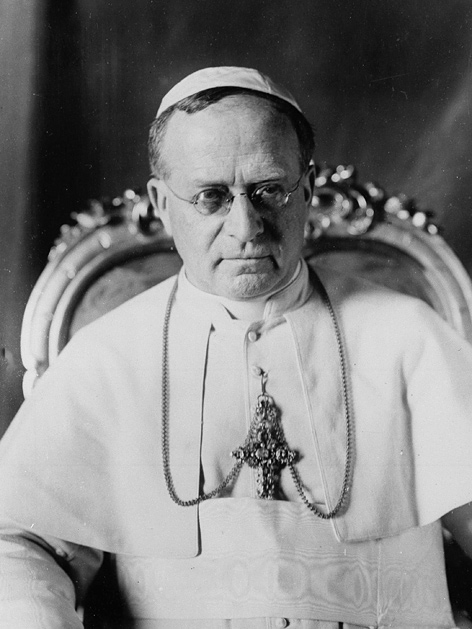
Pope Pius XI in 1938

By early 1937, the church hierarchy in Germany, which had initially attempted to co-operate with the new government, had become highly disillusioned. In March, Pope Pius XI issued the Mit brennender Sorge encyclical – accusing the Nazi Government of violations of the 1933 Concordat, and further that it was sowing the "tares of suspicion, discord, hatred, calumny, of secret and open fundamental hostility to Christ and His Church". The Pope noted on the horizon the "threatening storm clouds" of religious wars of extermination over Germany. The Nazis responded with, an intensification of the Church Struggle, beginning around April. There were mass arrests of clergy and church presses were expropriated. Goebbels noted heightened verbal attacks on the clergy from Hitler in his diary and wrote that Hitler had approved the start of trumped up "immorality trials" against clergy and anti-church propaganda campaign. Goebbels' orchestrated attack included a staged "morality trial" of 37 Franciscans.

Institutionally, the Catholic Church in Germany offered organised, systematic and consistent resistance to the policies of the Third Reich which infringed on ecclesiastical autonomy. As one of the few German institutions to retain some independence from the state, it was able to continue to co-ordinate a level of opposition to Government, and the churches, more than any other institutions, continued to provide a "forum in which individuals could distance themselves from the regime". In the words of Kershaw, the churches "engaged in a bitter war of attrition with the regime, receiving the demonstrative backing of millions of churchgoers. Applause for Church leaders whenever they appeared in public, swollen attendances at events such as Corpus Christi Day processions, and packed church services were outward signs of the struggle of ... especially of the Catholic Church – against Nazi oppression". While the church ultimately failed to protect its youth organisations and schools, it did have some successes in mobilizing public opinion to alter government policies. The churches challenged Nazi efforts to undermine various Christian institutions, practices and beliefs and Bullock wrote that "among the most courageous demonstrations of opposition during the war were the sermons preached by the Catholic Bishop of Münster and the Protestant Pastor, Dr Niemoller ..." but that nevertheless, "Neither the Catholic Church nor the Evangelical Church ... as institutions, felt it possible to take up an attitude of open opposition to the regime".

==== German Hierarchy ====
The 1933 Reich concordat between Germany and the Vatican prohibited clergy from participating in politics and in the aftermath of the Nazi takeover and signing of the Concordat, the outspoken nature of opposition by German Catholic leaders towards the Nazi movement weakened considerably. But it was from the clergy that the first major component of the German Resistance to the policies of the Third Reich emerged. "From the very beginning", wrote Hamerow, "some churchmen expressed, quite directly at times, their reservations about the new order. In fact those reservations gradually came to form a coherent, systematic critique of many of the teachings of National Socialism." Later, the most trenchant public criticism of the Third Reich came from some of Germany's religious leaders, as the government was reluctant to move against them, and though they could claim to be merely attending to the spiritual welfare of their flocks, "what they had to say was at times so critical of the central doctrines of National Socialism that to say it required great boldness", and they became resistors. Their resistance was directed not only against intrusions by the government into church governance and to arrests of clergy and expropriation of church property, but also to matters like Nazi euthanasia and eugenics and to the fundamentals of human rights and justice as the foundation of a political system.

A senior cleric could rely on a degree of popular support from the faithful, and thus the regime had to consider the possibility of nationwide protests if such figures were arrested. While hundreds of ordinary priests and members of monastic orders were sent to concentration camps throughout the Nazi period, just one German Catholic bishop was briefly imprisoned in a concentration camp, and just one other expelled from his diocese. This reflected also the cautious approach adopted by the hierarchy, who felt secure only in commenting on matters which transgressed on the ecclesiastical sphere.

While some clergymen refused ever to feign support for the regime, in the church's conflict with the state over ecclesiastical autonomy, the Catholic hierarchy adopted a strategy of "seeming acceptance of the Third Reich", by couching their criticisms as motivated merely by a desire to "point out mistakes that some of its overzealous followers committed" in order to strengthen the government. Cardinal Bertram of Breslau, the chairman of the German Conference of Bishops, developed a protest system which "satisfied the demands of the other bishops without annoying the regime". Firmer resistance by Catholic leaders gradually reasserted itself by the individual actions of leading churchmen like Joseph Frings, Konrad von Preysing, August von Galen and Michael von Faulhaber. But the German Episcopate was divided over relations with the Nazi regime – figures like Cardinal Bertram, favoured a policy of concessions, while figures like Bishop Preysing called for more concerted opposition. According to Michael Phayer, in relation to the mistreatment of Jews, "no other German bishops spoke as pointedly as Preysing and Frings". Fest nominates Presying and Galen, but also Archbishop Conrad Gröber among the individual clerics who led broader Catholic resistance.

On 22 March 1942, the German Bishops issued a pastoral letter on "The Struggle against Christianity and the Church". The letter launched a defence of human rights and the rule of law and accused the Reich Government of "unjust oppression and hated struggle against Christianity and the Church", despite the loyalty of German Catholics to the Fatherland, and brave service of Catholics soldiers. It accused the regime of seeking to rid Germany of Christianity:

For years a war has raged in our Fatherland against Christianity and the Church, and has never been conducted with such bitterness. Repeatedly the German bishops have asked the Reich Government to discontinue this fatal struggle; but unfortunately our appeals and our endeavours were without success.

— 22 March 1942 Pastoral Letter of the German Bishops

The letter outlined serial breaches of the 1933 Concordat, reiterated complaints of the suffocation of Catholic schooling, presses and hospitals and said that the "Catholic faith has been restricted to such a degree that it has disappeared almost entirely from public life" and even worship within churches in Germany "is frequently restricted or oppressed", while in the conquered territories (and even in the Old Reich), churches had been "closed by force and even used for profane purposes". The freedom of speech of clergymen had been suppressed and priests were being "watched constantly" and punished for fulfilling "priestly duties" and incarcerated in Concentration camps without legal process. Religious orders had been expelled from schools, and their properties seized, while seminaries had been confiscated "to deprive the Catholic priesthood of successors". The bishops denounced the Nazi euthanasia program and declared their support for human rights and personal freedom under God and "just laws" of all people:

We demand juridical proof of all sentences and release of all fellow citizens who have been deprived of their liberty without proof ... We the German bishops shall not cease to protest against the killing of innocent persons. Nobody's life is safe unless the Commandment, "Thous shalt not kill" is observed ... We the bishops, in the name of the Catholic people ... demand the return of all unlawfully confiscated and in some cases sequestered property ... for what happens today to church property may tomorrow happen to any lawful property.

— 22 March 1942 Pastoral Letter of the German Bishops

Faulhaber

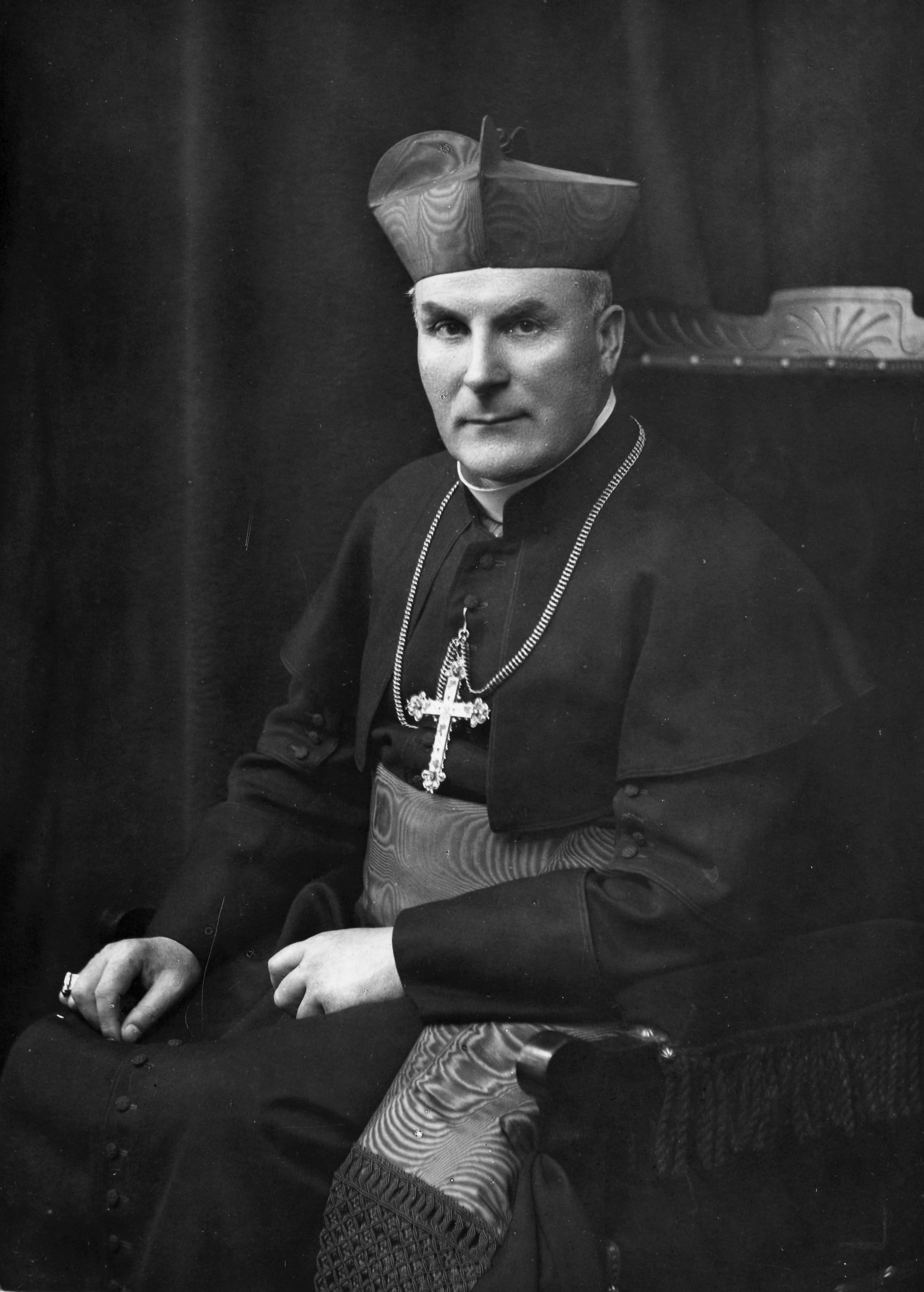
Cardinal Faulhaber (around 1936)

Cardinal Michael von Faulhaber gained an early reputation as a critic of the Nazi movement. Soon after the Nazi takeover, his three Advent sermons of 1933, entitled Judaism, Christianity, and Germany, affirmed the Jewish origins of the Christian religion, the continuity of the Old and New Testaments of the Bible, and the importance of the Christian tradition to Germany. Though Faulhaber's words were cautiously framed as a discussion of "historical" Judaism, his sermons denounced the Nazi extremists who were calling for the Bible to be purged of the "Jewish" Old Testament as a grave threat to Christianity: in seeking to adhere to the central tenet of Nazism, "The anti-Semitic zealots ..." wrote Hamerow, were also undermining "the basis of Catholicism. Neither accommodation, nor acquiescence was possible any longer; the cardinal had to face the enemy head on."

Hamerow wrote that Faulhaber would look to avoid conflict with the state over issues not strictly pertaining to the church, but on issues involving the defence of Catholics he "refused to compromise or retreat". On 4 November 1936, Hitler and Faulhaber met. Faulhaber told Hitler that the Nazi government had been waging war on the church for three years and had instituted laws the church could not accept – like the sterilization of criminals and disabled people. While the Catholic Church respected the notion of authority, he told the Dictator, "when your officials or your laws offend Church dogma or the laws of morality, and in so doing offend our conscience, then we must be able to articulate this as responsible defenders of moral laws". When in 1937 the authorities in Upper Bavaria attempted to replace Catholic schools with "common schools", he offered fierce resistance.

During the 1938 Kristallnacht, Faulhaber supplied a truck to rabbi of the Ohel Yaakov Synagogue, to rescue sacred objects before the building was torn down. Following mass demonstrations against Jews and Catholics, a Nazi mob attacked Faulhaber's palace, and smashed its windows. While Hamerow viewed Faulhaber as essentially a defender of "Catholic interests", other sources credit him with greater defiance. According to the Encyclopedia Britannica, "Throughout his sermons until the collapse (1945) of the Third Reich, Faulhaber vigorously criticized Nazism, despite governmental opposition. Attempts on his life were made in 1934 and in 1938. He worked with American occupation forces after the war, and received the West German Republic's highest award, the Grand Cross of the Order of Merit."

Preysing

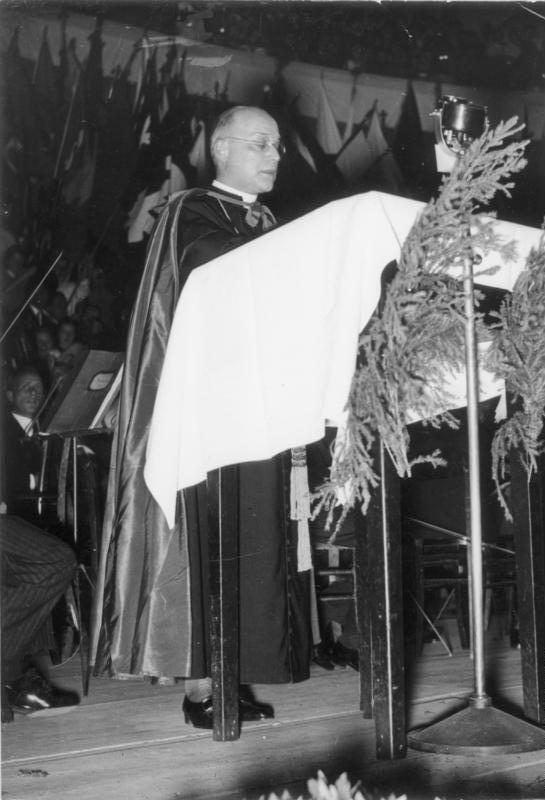
Bishop Konrad von Preysing was Bishop of Berlin, the capital city of Nazi Germany. He provided aid to the city's Jews and had links to the German Resistance.

Among the most firm and consistent of senior Catholics to oppose the Nazis was Konrad von Preysing. Preysing served as Bishop of Eichstatt from 1932 to 1935 and in 1935 was appointed as Bishop of Berlin – the capital of Nazi Germany. Preysing was loathed by Hitler, who said "the foulest of carrion are those who come clothed in the cloak of humility and the foulest of these Count Presying! What a beast!". Von Preysing opposed the appeasing attitudes of Bertram towards the Nazis and was one of the most firm and consistent church opponents of Hitler. He spoke out in public sermons and argued the case for firm opposition at bishops' conferences. He also worked with leading members of the resistance Carl Goerdeler and Helmuth James Graf von Moltke. He was part of the five-member commission that prepared the anti-Nazi encyclical Mit brennender Sorge of March 1937 and sought to block the Nazi closure of Catholic schools and arrests of church officials. In 1938, he became one of the co-founders of the Hilfswerk beim Bischöflichen Ordinariat Berlin (Welfare Office of the Berlin Diocese Office). He extended care to both baptised and unbaptised Jews and protested the Nazi euthanasia programme. His Advent Pastoral Letters of 1942 and 1943 on the nature of human rights reflected the anti-Nazi theology of the Barmen Declaration of the Confessing Church, leading one to be broadcast in German by the BBC. In 1944, Preysing met with and gave a blessing to Claus von Stauffenberg, in the lead up to the July Plot to assassinate Hitler, and spoke with the resistance leader on whether the need for radical change could justify tyrannicide. Despite Preysing's open opposition, the Nazis did not dare arrest him and several months after the end of the war he was named a cardinal by Pope Pius XII.

Galen

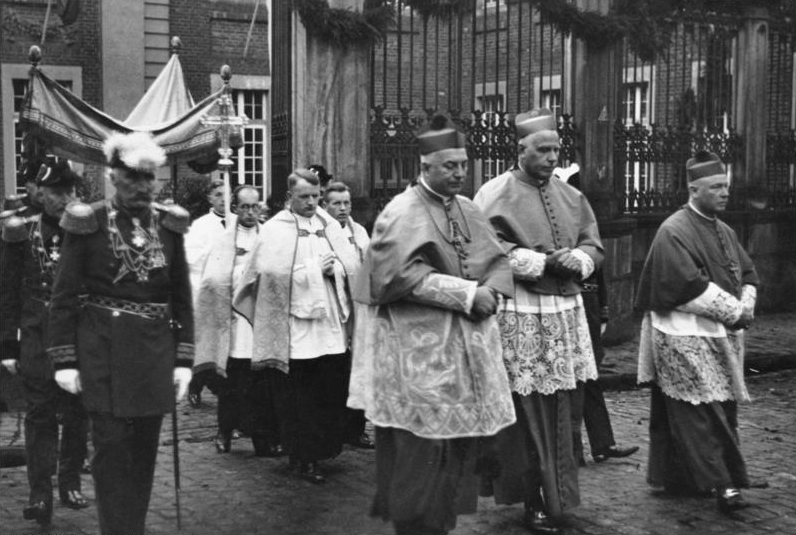
Bishop Clemens August von Galen October 1933

The Bishop of Münster, August von Galen was Preysing's cousin. Himself a German conservative and nationalist, in January 1934 he criticised Nazi racial policy in a sermon and in subsequent homilies, equated unquestioning loyalty to the Reich with "slavery" and spoke against Hitler's theory of the purity of German blood. Galen derided the neo-pagan theories of Rosenberg as perhaps no more than "an occasion for laughter in the educated world", but warned that "his immense importance lies in the acceptance of his basic notions as the authentic philosophy of National Socialism and in his almost unlimited power in the field of German education. Herr Rosenberg must be taken seriously if the German situation is to be understood."

When in 1933, the Nazi school superintendent of Münster issued a decree that religious instruction be combined with discussion of the "demoralising power" of the "people of Israel", Galen refused, writing that such interference in curriculum was a breach of the Concordat and that he feared children would be confused as to their "obligation to act with charity to all men" and as to the historical mission of the people of Israel. Often Galen directly protested to Hitler over violations of the Concordat. After constant confrontations, by late 1935, Bishop August von Galen of Münster was urging a joint pastoral letter protesting an "underground war" against the church. Hamerow characterised the resistance approach of senior Catholic clergy like August von Galen of Münster as "trying to influence the Third Reich from within". When in 1936, Nazis removed crucifixes in school, protest by Galen led to public demonstration. Like Presying, he assisted with the drafting of the 1937 papal encyclical.

In 1941, with the Wehrmacht still marching on Moscow, Galen, the old nationalist, denounced the lawlessness of the Gestapo, and the confiscations of church properties. He attacked the Gestapo for converting church properties to their own purposes – including use as cinemas and brothels. Galen protested the mistreatment of Catholics in Germany: the arrests and imprisonment without legal process, the suppression of the monasteries, the expulsion of religious orders. But his sermons went further than defending the church, he spoke of a moral danger to Germany from the regime's violations of basic human rights: "the right to life, to inviolability, and to freedom is an indispensable part of any moral social order", he said – and any government that punishes without court proceedings "undermines its own authority and respect for its sovereignty within the conscience of its citizens". Bishop von Galen led denunciation of Nazi euthanasia and the most widespread public protests against any Nazi policy up to that time.

"There are sacred obligations of conscience from which no one has the power to release us and which we must fulfil even if it costs us our lives."

— August von Galen, Bishop of Münster, 1941 Sermon

His three powerful sermons of July and August 1941 earned him the nickname of the "Lion of Münster". Galen's sermons appealed to Christian conscience as the well for opposition. The sermons were printed and distributed illegally. Hitler wanted to have Galen removed, but Goebbels told him this would result in the loss of the loyalty of Westphalia. Documents suggest the Nazis intended to hang von Galen at the end of the war. In a "Table Talk" from 1942, Hitler is quoted as having said: "The fact that I remain silent in public over Church affairs is not in the least misunderstood by the sly foxes of the Catholic Church, and I am quite sure that a man like Bishop von Galen knows full well that after the war I shall extract retribution to the last farthing".

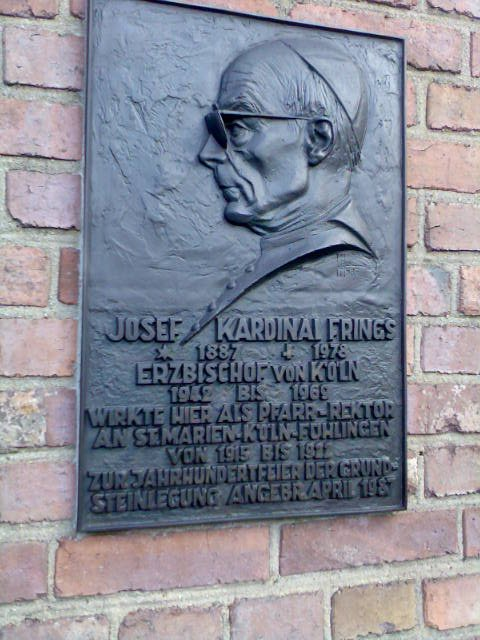
Memorial tablet for Joseph Frings at the parish church of Cologne-Fühlingen

Frings

Josef Frings became Archbishop of Cologne in 1942 and his consecration was used as a demonstration of Catholic self-assertion. In his sermons, he repeatedly spoke in support of persecuted peoples and against state repression. In March 1944, Frings attacked arbitrary arrests, racial persecution and forced divorces. That autumn, he protested to the Gestapo against the deportations of Jews from Cologne and surrounds. In 1943, the German bishops had debated whether to directly confront Hitler collectively over what they knew of the murdering of Jews. Frings wrote a pastoral letter cautioning his diocese not to violate the inherent rights of others to life, even those "not of our blood" and even during war, and preached in a sermon that "no one may take the property or life of an innocent person just because he is a member of a foreign race". Following war's end, Frings succeeded Bertram as chairman of the Fulda Bishops' Conference in July 1945 and in 1946 he was appointed a cardinal by Pius XII.

==== "Euthanasia" ====
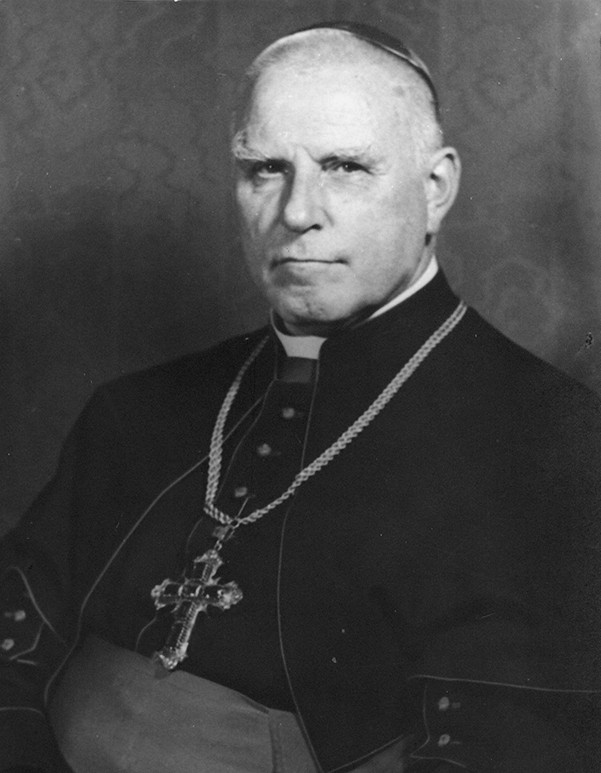
Clemens August Graf von Galen, Bishop of Münster, spoke out against euthanasia in Nazi Germany.

From 1934, the Nazis began to compulsorily sterilise the hereditarily diseased. Based on pseudoscientific eugenic theories, they sought to "cleanse" the German nation of "unhealthy breeding stock" and was taken a step further in 1939, when the regime commenced its mass-murder program, euphemistically referred to as "euthanasia". This was the first of the regime's infamous series of mass extermination programs, which saw the Nazis attempt to eliminate "life unworthy of life" from Europe: first the handicapped, then Jews, Gypsies, homosexuals, Jehovah's Witnesses, and others deemed "subnormal". Ultimately, the Jews suffered most in numerical terms, while Gypsies suffered the greatest proportional loss.

While the Nazi Final Solution liquidation of the Jews took place primarily on Polish territory, the murder of invalids took place on German soil, and involved interference in Catholic (and Protestant) welfare institutions. Awareness of the murderous programme therefore became widespread, and the church leaders who opposed it – chiefly the Catholic Bishop of Münster, Clemens August von Galen and Dr Theophil Wurm, the Protestant Bishop of Württemberg – were therefore able to rouse widespread public opposition. The intervention led to, in the words of Evans, "the strongest, most explicit and most widespread protest movement against any policy since the beginning of the Third Reich."

From 1939, the regime began its program of "euthanasia" program, under which those deemed "racially unfit" were to be murdered. Hitler's order for the T4 Euthanasia Program was dated 1 September, the day Germany invaded Poland. The senile, the mentally disabled and mentally ill, epileptics, cripples, children with Down syndrome and people with similar afflictions were all to be murdered. The program ultimately involved the systematic murder of more than 70,000 people. Among those murdered, a cousin of the young Joseph Ratzinger, future Pope Benedict XVI.

The Papacy and German bishops had already protested against the Nazi sterilization of the "racially unfit". Catholic protests against the escalation of this policy into "euthanasia" began in the summer of 1940. Despite Nazi efforts to transfer hospitals to state control, large numbers of disabled people were still under the care of the churches. Caritas was the chief organisation running such care services for the Catholic Church. After Protestant welfare activists took a stand at the Bethel Hospital in August von Galen's diocese, Galen wrote to Bertram in July 1940 urging the church take up a moral position. Bertram urged caution. Archbishop Conrad Groeber of Freiburg wrote to the head of the Reich Chancellery, and offered to pay all costs being incurred by the state for the "care of mentally people intended for death". Caritas directors sought urgent direction from the bishops, and the Fulda Bishops Conference sent a protest letter to the Reich Chancellery on 11 August, then sent Bishop Heinrich Wienken of Caritas to discuss the matter. Wienken cited the commandment "thous shalt not kill" to officials and warned them to halt the program or face public protest from the church. Wienken subsequently wavered, fearing a firm line might jeopardise his efforts to have Catholic priests released from Dachau, but was urged to stand firm by Cardinal Michael von Faulhaber. The government refused to give a written undertaking to halt the program, and the Vatican declared on 2 December that the policy was contrary to natural and positive Divine law: "The direct killing of an innocent person because of mental or physical defects is not allowed".

Bishop von Galen had the decree printed in his newspaper on 9 March 1941. Subsequent arrests of priests and seizure of Jesuit properties by the Gestapo in his home city of Munster, convinced Galen that the caution advised by his superior had become pointless. On 6, 13 and 20 July 1941, Galen spoke against the seizure of properties, and expulsions of nuns, monks and religious and criticised the euthanasia programme. In an attempt to cow Galen, the police raided his sister's convent, and detained her in the cellar. She escaped the confinement, and Galen, who had also received news of the imminent removal of further patients, launched his most audacious challenge on the regime in a 3 August sermon. As word of the program spread, protest grew, until finally, Bishop August von Galen delivered his famous 1941 sermons denouncing the program as "murder". He declared the murders to be illegal, and said that he had formally accused those responsible for murders in his diocese in a letter to the public prosecutor. The policy opened the way to the murder of all "unproductive people", like old horses or cows, including invalid war veterans: "Who can trust his doctor anymore?", he asked.

On 3 August 1941, in one of his series of denunciations, Galen declared:

"Thou shalt not kill." God engraved this commandment on the souls of men long before any penal code ... God has engraved these commandments in our hearts ... They are the unchangeable and fundamental truths of our social life ... Where in Germany and where, here, is obedience to the precepts of God? ... As for the first commandment, "Thou shalt not have strange gods before me," instead of the One, True, Eternal God, men have created at the dictates of their whim, their own gods to adore: Nature, the State, the Nation, or the Race.

He declared, wrote Evans, that Catholics must "avoid those who blasphemed, attacked their religion, or brought about the death of innocent men and women. Otherwise they would become involved in their guilt". Galen said that it was the duty of Christians to resist the taking of human life, even if it meant losing their own lives. Thousands of copies of the sermons were circulated across Germany.

"The sensation created by the sermons", wrote Evans, "was enormous". Kershaw characterised Von Galen's 1941 "open attack" on the government's euthanasia program as a "vigorous denunciation of Nazi inhumanity and barbarism". According to Gill, "Galen used his condemnation of this appalling policy to draw wider conclusions about the nature of the Nazi state." Galen had the sermons read in parish churches. The British broadcast excerpts over the BBC German service, dropped leaflets over Germany, and distributed the sermons in occupied countries.

There were demonstrations across Catholic Germany – Hitler himself faced angry demonstrators at Nuremberg, the only time he was confronted with such resistance by ordinary Germans. The regime did not halt the murders, but took the program underground. Bishop Antonius Hilfrich of Limburg wrote to the Justice Minister, denouncing the murders. Bishop Albert Stohr of Mainz condemned the taking of life from the pulpit. Some of the priests who distributed the sermons were among those arrested and sent to the concentration camps amid the public reaction to the sermons. The regional Nazi leader, and Hitler's deputy Martin Bormann called for Galen to be hanged, but Hitler and Goebbels urged a delay in retribution until war's end. With the programme now public knowledge, nurses and staff (particularly in Catholics institutions), now increasingly seeking to obstruct implementation of the policy, Hitler ordered a halt to the murder of adults (though maintained the easier to conceal murder of children). Following the war, Pope Pius XII hailed von Galen a hero and promoted him to Cardinal.

In 1943, Pius issued the Mystici corporis Christi encyclical, in which he condemned the practice of murdering disabled people. He stated his "profound grief at the murder of the deformed, the insane, and those suffering from hereditary disease ... as though they were a useless burden to Society", in condemnation of the ongoing Nazi euthanasia program. The Encyclical was followed, on 26 September 1943, by an open condemnation by the German Bishops which, from every German pulpit, denounced the murder of "innocent and defenceless mentally handicapped, incurably infirm and fatally wounded, innocent hostages, and disarmed prisoners of war and criminal offenders, people of a foreign race or descent".

==== German Priests and religious ====
While Hitler did not feel powerful enough to arrest senior clergy before the end of the war, an estimated one third of German priests faced some form of reprisal from the Nazi government. Bishop von Preysing was protected from Nazi retaliation by his position, his cathedral administrator and confidant, Provost Bernard Lichtenberg, was not. A strong opponent of Nazism, Lichtenberg had been active with the Catholic Centre Party. Lichtenberg served at St. Hedwig's Cathedral from 1932, and was under the watch of the Gestapo by 1933, for his courageous support of prisoners and Jews. He became a confidante of Bishop von Preysing from 1935. He ran Preysing's aid unit (the Hilfswerke beim Bischöflichen Ordinariat Berlin) which secretly gave assistance to those who were being persecuted by the regime. From the Kristallnacht pogrom of November 1938 onward, Lichtenberg closed each nightly service with a prayer for "the Jews, and the poor prisoners in the concentration camps", including "my fellow priests there". Lichtenberg met his demise for protesting the Nazi policy regarding euthanasia directly to Dr. Conti, the Nazi State Medical Director. On 28 August 1941, he endorsed Galen's sermons in a letter to Conti, pointing to the German constitution which defined euthanasia as an act of murder. On 23 October 1942, he offered a prayer for the Jews being deported to the East, telling his congregation to extend to the Jews the commandment of Christ to "Love thy neighbour". For preaching against Nazi propaganda and writing a letter of protest concerning Nazi euthanasia, he was arrested in 1941, sentenced to two years' penal servitude, and died en route to Dachau Concentration Camp in 1943. He was subsequently honoured by Yad Vashem as Righteous among the Nations.

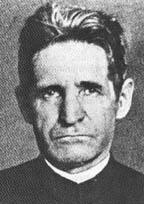
Rupert Mayer was sent to Sachsenhausen concentration camp in 1939.

Rupert Mayer, a Bavarian Jesuit and World War I army chaplain, had clashed with the National Socialists as early as 1923. Continuing his critique following Hitler's rise to power, Mayer was imprisoned in 1939 and sent to Sachsenhausen concentration camp. As his health declined, the Nazis feared the creation of a martyr and sent him to the Abbey of Ettal, but Mayer died in 1945.

Laurentius Siemer, Provincial of the Dominican Province of Teutonia, became a steadfast opponent of the Nazi regime and had contacts with the Resistance. The Gestapo arrested Siemer in Cologne in 1935, as part of the "Currency Fraud Cases" targeting Catholic clergy, and held him in custody for several months. He was influential in the Committee for Matters Relating to the Orders, which formed in response to Nazi attacks against Catholic monasteries and aimed to encourage the bishops to intercede on behalf of the Orders and oppose the Nazi state more emphatically. He spoke to resistance circles on the subject of Catholic social teaching as the starting point for the reconstruction of Germany, and worked with Carl Goerdeler and others in planning for a post-coup Germany. Following the failure of the July Plot, Siemer evaded capture and hid out until the end of the war.

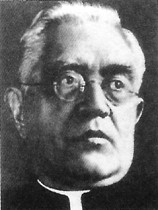
Fr. Otto Müller of the German Resistance was arrested following the 1944 July Plot, and died in police custody.

Also involved in the German Resistance was Christian workers' movement activist and Centre Party politician Otto Müller. Müller was among those who argued for a firm line from the German bishops against legal violations of the Nazis. In contact with the German military opposition before the outbreak of war, he later allowed individual opposition figures the use of the Ketteler-Haus in Cologne for their discussions and was involved with Catholic politicians and July Plotters Jakob Kaiser, Nikolaus Groß and Bernhard Letterhaus in planning a post Nazi-Germany. After the failure of the July Plot, the Gestapo arrested Müller, who was imprisoned in the Berlin Police Hospital, where he died.

Parish priests such as the Lübeck martyrs – Johannes Prassek, Eduard Müller and Hermann Lange, and the Lutheran pastor Karl Friedrich Stellbrink were partly inspired by August von Galen's anti-euthanasia homilies. They shared disapproval of the Nazi regime, and the four priests spoke publicly against the Nazis – initially discreetly – distributing pamphlets to friends and congregants. Although church federation work with young people was banned, Müller worked with youth groups and led a discussion circle whose topics included National Socialism, political events and the military situation – using information from British radio and from leaflets including the sermons of Bishop Clemens August von Galen, which he duplicated with Lange and Prassek. Then, following a March 1942 RAF raid, after which Stellbrink tended wounded, he delivered a Palm Sunday sermon which attributed the bombing to divine punishment. Stellbrink was arrested, followed by the three Catholic priests, and each was sentenced to death. Resigned to martyrdom, Prassek wrote to his family: "Who can oppress one who dies". The mingling of the blood of the four guillotined martyrs has become a symbol of German Ecumenism.

Max Josef Metzger, a Roman Catholic priest, founded the German Catholics' Peace Association in 1919 and sought links to the international pacifist movement. He was targeted by the Nazi authorities and arrested several times. In June 1943, after being denounced by a Gestapo agent for attempting to send a memorandum on the reorganisation of the German state and its integration into a future system of world peace to Erling Eidem, the Archbishop of Uppsala, Metzger was sentenced to death. He was executed on 17 April 1944.

An old guard of national-conservatives aligned to Carl Friedrich Goerdeler broke with Hitler in the mid-1930s. According to Kershaw, they "despised the barbarism of the Nazi regime. But were keen to re-establish Germany's status as a major power ...". Essentially authoritarian, they favoured monarchy and limited electoral rights "resting on Christian family values". "Hitlerism is poison for the German soul", wrote Goerdeler, "Hitler is determined to destroy Christianity".

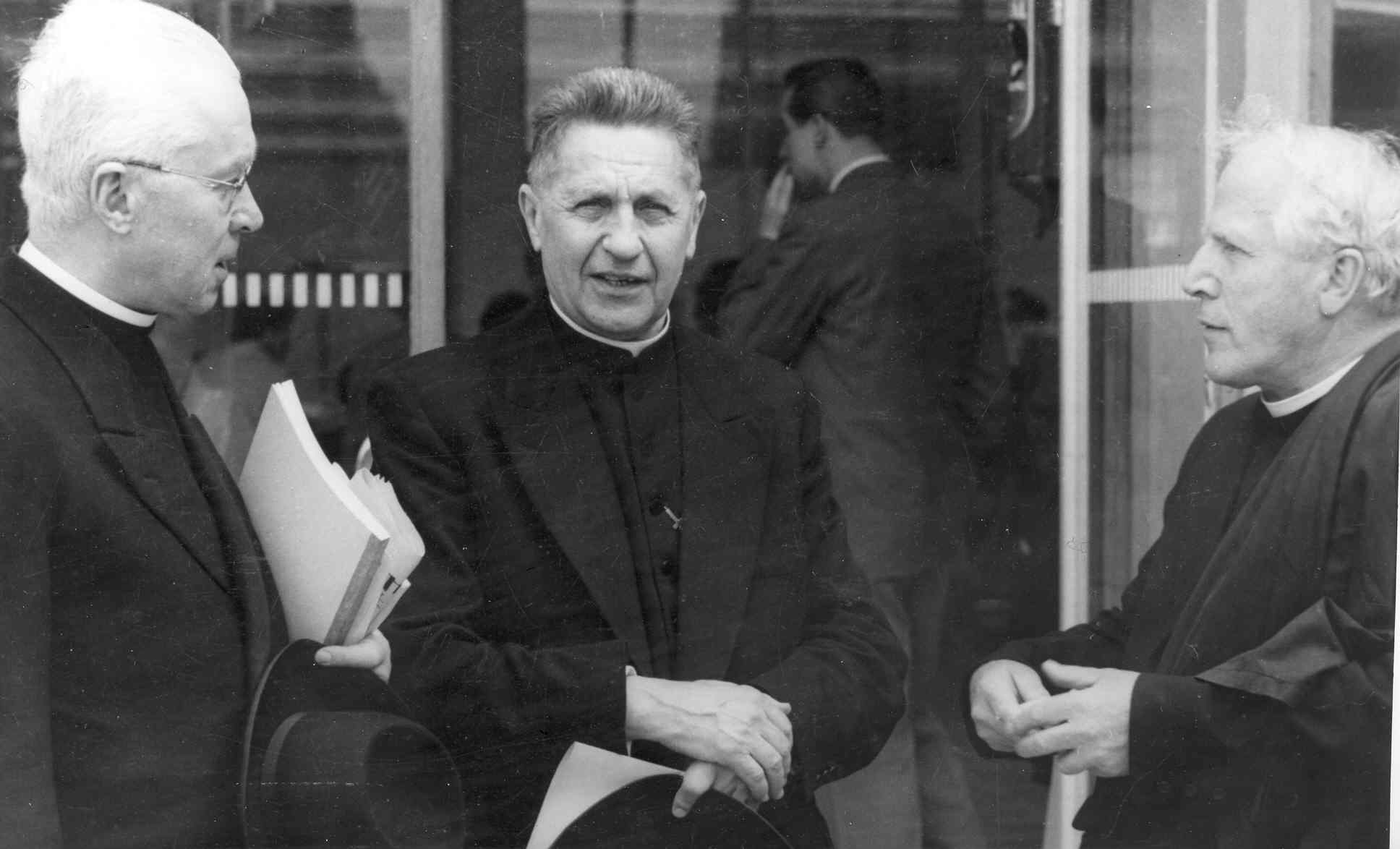
Augustin Rösch (centre) was the wartime Jesuit Provincial of Bavaria and one of three Jesuits in the inner Kreisau Circle of the German Resistance.

A younger group, dubbed the "Kreisau Circle" by the Gestapo, did not look to German imperialism for inspiration. Religious motivations were particularly strong in the Kreisau Circle of the Resistance. Formed in 1937, though multi-denominational, it had a strongly Christian orientation, and looked for a general Christian revival, and reawakening of awareness of the transcendental. Its outlook was rooted both in German romantic and idealist tradition and in the Catholic doctrine of natural law. The Circle looked to a federalised Europe along the lines of the United States as the desirable "new order", resting heavily on German Christian and social ideals, with self-governing communities rooted in social justice. The Circle pressed for a coup against Hitler, but being unarmed was dependent on persuading military figures to take action.

Among the central membership of the Circle were the Jesuit priests Augustin Rösch, Alfred Delp and Lothar König. Bishop von Preysing had contact with the group. The Catholic conservative Karl Ludwig von Guttenberg brought the Jesuit Provincial of Southern Germany Augustin Rösch into the Kreisau Circle, along with Alfred Delp. For figures like Rösch, the Catholic trade unionists Jakob Kaiser and Bernhard Letterhaus and the July Plot leader Klaus von Stauffenberg, "religious motives and the determination to resist would seem to have developed hand in hand".

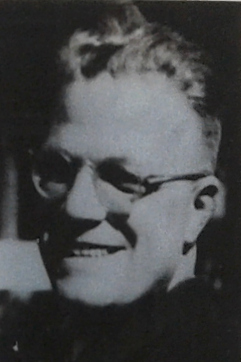
The Jesuit Alfred Delp was an influential member of the Kreisau Circle – one of the few clandestine German Resistance groups operating inside Nazi Germany. He was executed in February 1945.

According to Gill, "Delp's role was to sound out for Moltke the possibilities in the Catholic Community of support for a new, post-war Germany". Rösch and Delp also explored the possibilities for common ground between Christian and socialist trade unions. Lothar König SJ became an important intermediary between the Circle and bishops Grober of Freiberg and Presying of Berlin.

The Kreisau group combined conservative notions of reform with socialist strains of thought – a symbiosis expressed by Delp's notion of "personal socialism". The group rejected Western models, but wanted to "associate conservative and socialist values, aristocracy and workers, in a new democratic synthesis which would include the churches." Delp wrote: "It is time the 20th Century revolution was given a definitive theme, and the opportunity to create new and lasting horizons for humanity", by which he meant, social security and the basics for individual intellectual and religious development. So long as people lacked dignity, they would be incapable of prayer or thought. In Die dritte Idee (The Third Idea), Delp expounded on the notion of a third way, which, as opposed to Communism and Capitalism, might restore the unity of the person and society.

Another non-military German Resistance group, dubbed the "Frau Solf Tea Party" by Gestapo, included the Jesuit Fr Friedrich Erxleben. The purpose of the Solf Circle was to seek out humanitarian ways of countering the Nazi regime. It met at either Frau Solf or Elizabeth von Thadden's home. Von Thadden was a Christian educational reformer and Red Cross worker. Otto Kiep and most of the group were arrested in 1941 and executed.

==== Priests of Dachau ====
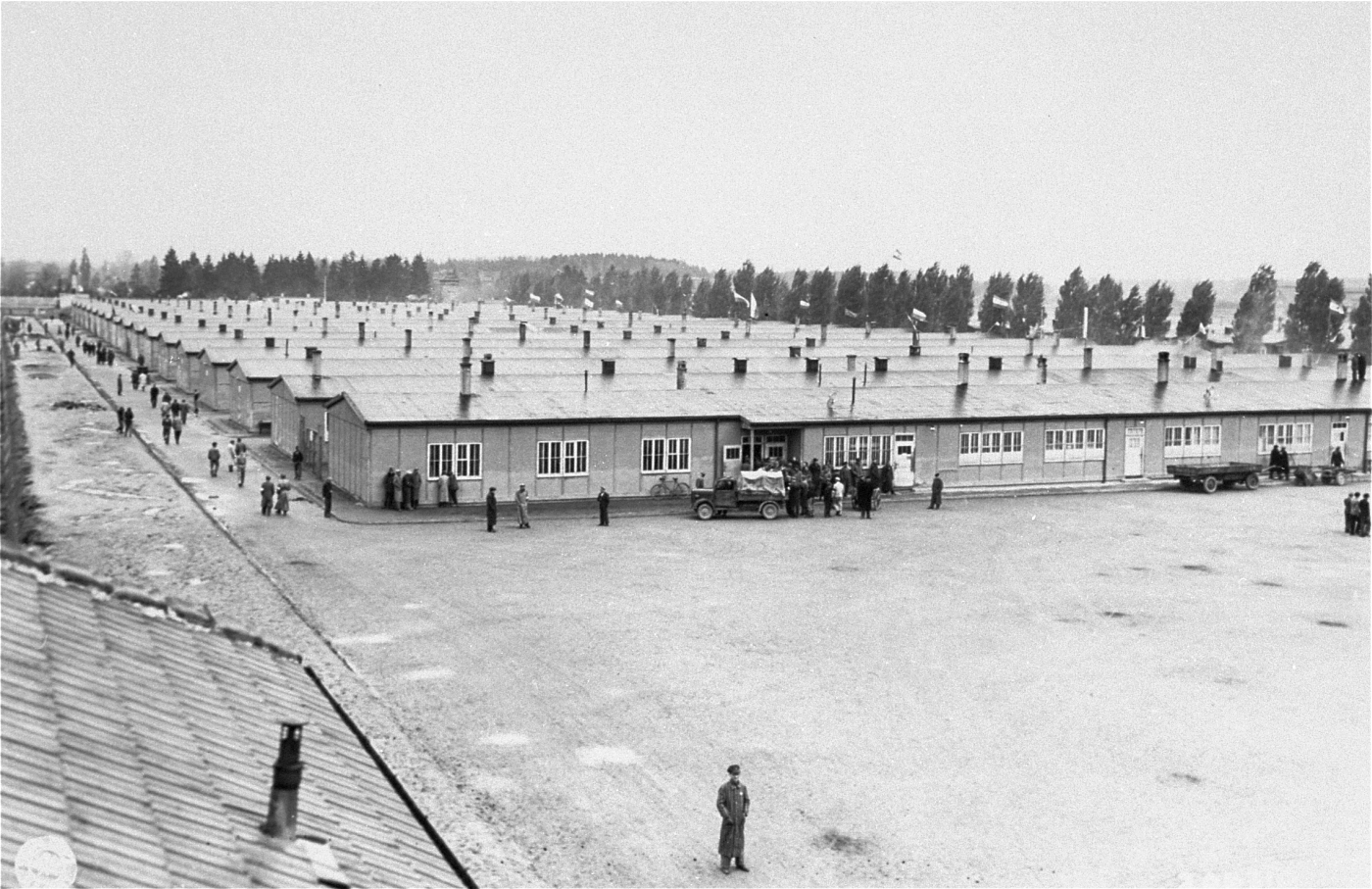
Prisoner barracks at Dachau Concentration Camp, where the Nazis established a dedicated clergy barracks for clerical opponents of the regime

In effort to counter the strength and influence of spiritual resistance, Nazi security services monitored Catholic clergy very closely – instructing that agents be set up in every diocese, that the bishops' reports to the Vatican should be obtained and that the bishops' areas of activity must be found out. A "vast network" was established to monitor the activities of ordinary clergy: Nazi security agents wrote "The importance of this enemy is such that inspectors of security police and of the security service will make this group of people and the questions discussed by them their special concern". Priests were frequently denounced, arrested and sent to concentration camps, often simply on the basis of being "suspected of activities hostile to the State" or that there was reason to "suppose that his dealings might harm society".

Dachau was established in March 1933 as the first Nazi Concentration Camp. Chiefly a political camp, it was here that the Nazis established in 1940 a dedicated Clergy Barracks. Of a total of 2,720 clergy recorded as imprisoned at Dachau, some 2,579 (or 94.88%) were Catholic and a total of 1,034 clergy were recorded overall as dying in the camp, with 132 "transferred or liquidated" during that time – although R. Schnabel's 1966 investigation found an alternative total of 2,771, with 692 noted as deceased and 336 sent out on "invalid trainloads" and therefore presumed dead.

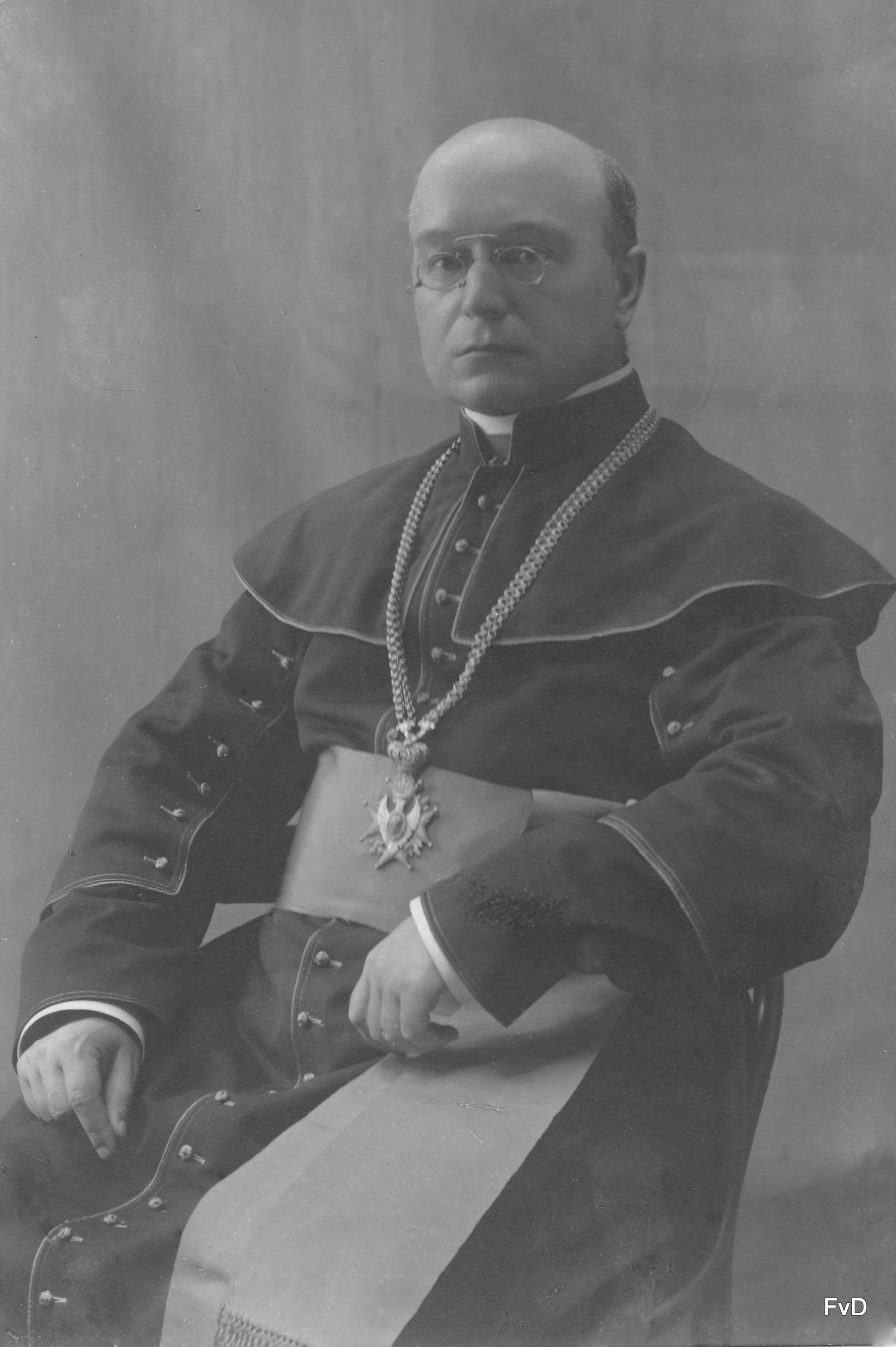
Antoni Zawistowski was tortured and murdered at Dachau in 1942. 1,780 Polish clergy were sent to Dachau, and many are remembered among the 108 Polish Martyrs of World War II.

By far the greatest number of priest prisoners came from Poland – in all some 1,748 Polish Catholic clerics, of whom some 868 died in the camp. Germans constituted the next largest group – 411 German Catholic priests were sent to Dachau, of whom 94 died in the camp and 100 were "transferred or liquidated". France contributed the next main group, with 153 Catholic clerics, among whom ten were murdered at the camp. Other Catholic priests were sent from Czechoslovakia, the Netherlands, Yugoslavia, Belgium, Italy, Luxembourg, Lithuania, Hungary and Rumania, while from outside the Nazi Empire – 2 British and one Spaniard were incarcerated at Dachau, as well as one "stateless" priest.

In December 1935, Wilhelm Braun, a Catholic theologian from Munich, became the first churchman imprisoned at Dachau. The annexation of Austria saw an increase in clerical inmates. Berben wrote: "The commandant at the time, Loritz, persecuted them with ferocious hatred, and unfortunately he found some prisoners to help the guards in their sinister work". Despite SS hostility to religious observance, the Vatican and German bishops successfully lobbied the regime to concentrate clergy at one camp and obtained permission to build a chapel, for the priests to live communally and for time to be allotted to them for the religious and intellectual activity. From December 1940, priests were gathered in Blocks 26, 28 – and 30, though only temporarily. 26 became the international block and 28 was reserved for Poles – the most numerous group.

Conditions varied for prisoners in the camp. The Nazis introduced a racial hierarchy – keeping Poles in harsh conditions, while favouring German priests. Many Polish priests simply died of the cold, not given sufficient clothing. A large number were killed in horrific Nazi medical experiments. Several Poles were killed via the "invalid trains" sent out from the camp, others were murdered in the camp and given bogus death certificates. Some died of cruel punishment for misdemeanors – murdered by beatings or worked to death.

Religious activity outside the chapel was totally forbidden. Priests would secretly take confessions and distribute the Eucharist among other prisoners.

Amid the Nazi persecution of the Tirolian Catholics, Otto Neururer, a parish priest was sent to Dachau for "slander to the detriment of German marriage", after he advised a girl against marrying the friend of a senior Nazi. After agreeing to perform a forbidden baptism at Buchenwald, Neururer was sent to the punishment block, where he was murdered by being hanged upside down on 30 May 1940. This was reportedly conducted at the orders of the sadistic SS Hauptscharführer Martin Sommer – the "Hangman of Buchenwald". He was the first priest murdered in the concentration camps.

Among the priest-martyrs killed at Dachau were many of the 108 Polish Martyrs of World War II.Gerhard Hirschfelder died of hunger and illness in 1942. Titus Brandsma, a Dutch Carmelite, was murdered by a lethal injection in 1942. The Nazis murdered Alois Andritzki, a German priest, by lethal injection in 1943. Engelmar Unzeitig, a Czech priest died of typhoid in 1945. Giuseppe Girotti died at the camp in April 1945.

In December 1944, Karl Leisner, a deacon from Munster who was dying of tuberculosis received his ordination at Dachau. Leisner had been active in the Christian Youth Movement under Bishop von Galen, bringing him to the attention of the Gestapo. His fellow prisoner Gabriel Piguet, the Bishop of Clermont-Ferrand presided at the secret ceremony. Leisner died soon after the liberation of the camp.

Among other notable Catholic clerics sent to Dachau were: Jean Bernard of Luxembourg, Hilary Paweł Januszewski (d.1945), Lawrence Wnuk, Ignacy Jeż and Adam Kozłowiecki of Poland; Josef Lenzel, August Froehlich, Georg Häfner and Bernhard Heinzmann of Germany. Following the war, the Mortal Agony of Christ Chapel and a convent for Carmelite nuns were built at Dachau in commemoration.

The Clergy Barracks of Dachau : Statistics by main Nationalities
Nationality	Total number	Total Catholic	Total Released	Total Transferred	Total Liberated 29 April 1945	Total Deceased
Poland	1780	1748	78	4	830	868
Germany	447	411	208	100	45	94
France	156	153	5	4	137	10
Czechoslovakia	109	93	1	10	74	24
Netherlands	63	39	10	0	36	17
Yugoslavia	50	35	2	6	38	4
Belgium	46	46	1	3	33	9
Italy	28	28	0	1	26	1
Luxembourg	16	16	2	0	8	6
Total	2720	2579	314	132	1240	1034

=== Lay resistors ===
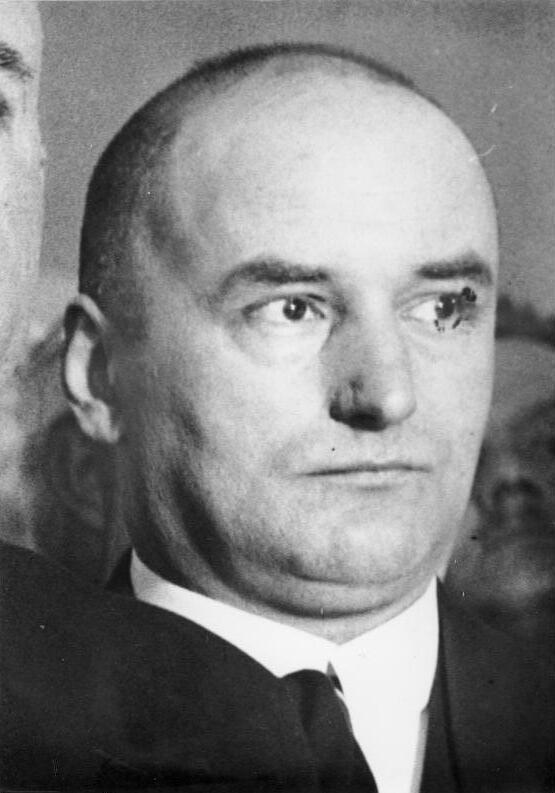
Erich Klausener, the head of Catholic Action, was assassinated in Hitler's "Night of the Long Knives" purge of 1934.

In his history of the German Resistance to Hitler, Anton Gill wrote that "more than anyone else, the Catholics showed their disapproval of the regime by huge gatherings" but that "this was the only collective resistance Catholics showed". In 1935, in Hagen, Catholics gathered to protest against a performance of the Nazi playwright Edmund Kiss's anti-Christian play Wittekind. Police crushed the riot. In November 1936, the Oldenburg Nazis removed crucifixes from schools. Bishop Galen protested, which led to a public demonstration, and the cancellation of the order. In 1937, amidst harassment of the church and following the hundreds of arrests and closure of Catholic presses that followed the issuing of Pope Pius XI's Mit brennender Sorge encyclical, at least 800,000 people attended a pilgrimage centred on Aachen – a massive demonstration by the standards of the day – and some 60,000 attended the 700th anniversary of the bishopric of Franconia – about equal to the city's entire population.

Following the outbreak of war, conscientious objectors were executed for treason, as with Franz Jagerstatter.

==== Early resistance ====
In the year following Hitler's "seizure of power", political players in Germany began wondering how the regime might be overthrown. The old political opponents of Nazism faced their final opportunity to halt the Nazification of Germany. The formerly influential Catholic aligned Centre Party and Bavarian People's Party dissolved themselves under terrorisation in the first week of July 1933, and non-Nazi parties were prohibited under the "Law Against the Formation of Parties" (14 July 1933). The former Centre Party leader and Reich Chancellor Heinrich Brüning looked for a way to oust Hitler, along with military chiefs Kurt von Schleicher and Kurt von Hammerstein-Equord. Erich Klausener, an influential civil servant and president of Berlin's Catholic Action group organised Catholic conventions in Berlin in 1933, and 1934. At the 1934 rally, he spoke against political oppression to a crowd of 60,000 following mass – just six nights before Hitler struck in a bloody purge.

The political temperature was also raised when the Conservative Catholic nobleman Franz von Papen, who had helped Hitler to power and was serving as the Deputy Reich Chancellor, delivered an indictment of the Nazi government in his Marburg speech of 17 June 1934. Papen's speech writer and advisor Edgar Jung, a Catholic Action worker, seized the opportunity to reassert the Christian foundation of the state and the need to avoid agitation and propaganda. "It is time", the speech declared "to join together in fraternal friendship and respect for all our fellow countrymen, to avoid disturbing the labours of serious men and to silence fanatics". The speech was banned from the press. Jung had been a tireless opponent of the Nazis, and took every opportunity to undermine them. His speech pleaded for religious freedom, and rejected totalitarian aspirations in the field of religion. It was hoped the speech might spur a rising, centred on Hindenberg, Papen and the army.

Hitler decided to strike at his chief political opponents both within and without the Nazi movement in a bloody purge: the Night of the Long Knives. The purge lasted two days over 30 June and 1 July 1934. Leading rivals of Hitler in the Nazi movement were murdered, along with over 100 opposition figures, including high-profile Catholic resistors. Erich Klausener became the first Catholic martyr. Hitler personally ordered the arrest of Jung and his transfer to Gestapo headquarters, Berlin. Like Klausener, he was murdered in the Long Knives purge. Papen, who was probably also listed for execution, protested, but fell back in line and did not challenge Hitler again.

The church had resisted attempts by the new Nazi Government to close its youth organisations and Adalbert Probst, the national director of the Catholic Youth Sports Association, was also eliminated in the purge – abducted and later found dead, allegedly "shot while trying to escape".

On 2 August 1934, the aged President von Hindenberg died. The offices of President and Chancellor were combined and bestowed upon Hitler by the "Law Concerning the Head of State of the German Reich". The German armed forces were required to swear an oath of loyalty, not to the constitution or the state, but to Hitler personally. Hitler declared his "revolution" complete.

==== Catholic writers ====
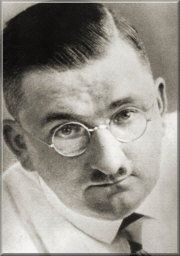
Fritz Gerlich, editor of Munich's Catholic weekly, Der Gerade Weg, and critic of the Nazies, was among the high-profile Catholic opposition figures targeted for assassination in the 1934 Night of the Long Knives.

The flourishing Catholic press of Germany faced censorship and closure under the Nazis. In 1933, the Nazis established a Reich Chamber of Authorship and Reich Press Chamber under the Reich Cultural Chamber of the Ministry for Propaganda. Writers had to be registered with the relevant chamber. On 10 May, "degenerate literary works" were burned by the thousand at the public squares of Berlin and other cities. As the Nazis asserted themselves, non-conformist writers were terrorised, their works burned, and fear pervaded. The June–July 1934 Night of the Long Knives purge was the culmination of this early campaign. Fritz Gerlich, the editor of Munich's Catholic weekly, Der Gerade Weg, was killed in the purge for his strident criticism of the Nazi movement.

The poet Ernst Wiechert delivered a speech at the Ludwig-Maximilians-Universität München, calling for love, compassion, truth, freedom and the law. He protested the government's attitudes to the arts, calling them "spiritual murder". He was arrested and taken to Dachau Concentration Camp.

Nikolaus Gross was a Christian trade unionist, member of the Centre Party and director of the West German Workers' Newspaper Westdeutschen Arbeiterzeitung, the newspaper of the Catholic Workers' movement. From early days an opponent of Nazism, he was declared an enemy of the state in 1938, and his newspaper was shut down. He continued to publish an underground edition and worked to rouse resistance among Catholic workers. Arrested in the July Plot round up, he was executed on 23 January 1945. He was declared a martyr and beatified by Pope John Paul II in 2001.

Writer and theologian Dietrich von Hildebrand was a vocal opponent of Hitler and Nazism. Blacklisted by the Nazi movement in the 1920s, he ran religious discussions in his Munich home from 1924 to 1930, which were attended by distinguished theologians such as Erich Przywara, S.J., Mgrs Martin Grabmann and Konrad von Preysing. Following Hitler's seizure of power, he fled from Germany, first to Italy, and then to Vienna, Austria, where, with the support of Austrian Chancellor Engelbert Dollfuss he founded and edited an anti-Nazi weekly paper, Der Christliche Ständestaat ("The Christian Corporative State"). For this, he was sentenced to death in absentia by the Nazis. When Hitler annexed Austria in 1938, von Hildebrand was once again forced to flee, spending time in Switzerland, France (where he taught at the Catholic University of Toulouse until the Nazis invaded France in 1940), then to Portugal and finally to New York in 1940. There he taught philosophy at the Jesuit Fordham University.

Hundreds of arrests and closure of Catholic presses followed the issuing of Pope Pius XI's Mit brennender Sorge anti-Nazi encyclical.

==== Catholic Aid Agencies ====
Members of Catholic aid agencies such as Caritas provided relief to victims of the Nazis and gathered intelligence on the fate of prisoners of the regime. Among the German laity, Gertrud Luckner, was among the first to sense the genocidal inclinations of the Hitler regime and to take national action. A pacifist and member of the German Catholics' Peace Association, she had been supporting victims of political persecution since 1933 and from 1938 worked at the head office of the German Association of Catholic Charitable Organizations, "Caritas". Using international contacts she secured safe passage abroad for many refugees. She organized aid circles for Jews, assisted many to escape. She cooperated with the priests Bernhard Lichtenberg and Alfred Delp. Following the outbreak of the war, she continued her work for the Jews through Caritas' war relief office – attempting to establish a national underground network through Caritas cells. She personally investigated the fate of the Jews being transported to the East and managed to obtain information on prisoners in concentration camps, and obtain clothing, food and money for forced labourers and prisoners of war. Caritas secured safe emigration for hundreds of converted Jews, but Luckner was unable to organise an effective national underground network. She was arrested in 1943 and only narrowly escaped death in the concentration camps.

Social worker Margarete Sommer had been sacked from her welfare institute for refusing to teach the Nazi line on sterilization. In 1935, she took up a position at the Episcopal Diocesan Authority in Berlin, counselling victims of racial persecution for Caritas Emergency Relief. In 1941 she became director of the Welfare Office of the Berlin Diocesan Authority, under Bernhard Lichtenberg. Following Lichtenberg's arrest, Sommer reported to Bishop Konrad von Preysing. While working for the Welfare Office, Sommer coordinated Catholic aid for victims of racial persecution – giving spiritual comfort, food, clothing, and money. She gathered intelligence on the deportations of the Jews, and living conditions in concentration camps, as well as on SS firing squads, writing several reports on these topics from 1942, including an August 1942 report which reached Rome under the title "Report on the Exodus of the Jews".

==== White Rose ====
The White Rose group was formed by students at the Ludwig-Maximilians-Universität München and advocated non-violent resistance against the Hitler regime. From 1942, White Rose published leaflets to influence people against Nazism and militarism. They criticised the "anti-Christian" and "anti-social" nature of the war. Among the leaders of the group, Willi Graf had been involved with the banned Catholic Youth movement and Christoph Probst was baptised into the church on the day of his execution. The Lutheran Hans Scholl had read Bishop von Galen's 1941 sermons and had worked for Professor Carl Muth, editor of the Catholic Magazine High Land, which had been banned in 1941. His sister Sophie Scholl had been influenced by Theodor Haecker to read John Henry Newman's writings on conscience, sentiments echoed by Galen. The Scholl siblings, Kurt Huber, Willi Graf and Alexander Schmorell were caught and executed in 1943.

=== Catholics in the German Resistance ===
Though Catholics were prominent in the German Resistance, according to Fest, it essentially consisted of a "motley collection of individuals who differed greatly in their social origins, habits of thought, political attitudes and methods of action" and was by and large slow to accept the need for violence to displace Hitler. A few civilian resistance groups developed, but the Army was the only organisation with the capacity to overthrow the government, and from within it a small number of officers came to present the most serious threat posed to the Nazi regime. The Foreign Office and the Abwehr (Military Intelligence) also provided vital support to the movement. But many of those in the military who ultimately chose to seek to overthrow Hitler had initially supported the regime, if not all of its methods. Hitler's 1938 purge of the military was accompanied by increased militancy in the Nazification of Germany, a sharp intensification of the persecution of Jews, and daring foreign policy exploits, bringing Germany to the brink of war and it was at this time that the German Resistance emerged.

The Resistance members were motivated by such factors as the mistreatment of Jews, harassment of the churches, and the harsh actions of Himmler and the Gestapo. In his history of the German Resistance, Peter Hoffmann wrote that "National Socialism was not simply a party like any other; with its total acceptance of criminality it was an incarnation of evil, so that all those whose minds were attuned to democracy, Christianity, freedom, humanity or even mere legality found themselves forced into alliance ...". The Nazi policy of Gleichschaltung (forced conformity to the Nazi Party) met with such forceful opposition from the German churches, that Hitler decided to delay confrontation until the end of the war. The truce constituted a rare win of sorts for an opposition movement in Nazi Germany. The standoff fed the will of many German resistors, but the churches as institutions stopped short of ever offering a general resistance to Nazi rule.

During the summer of 1938, wrote Hamerow, small groups of dissidents from the armed forces and civil service began to meet informally, the most prominent figure in these early days being Ludwig Beck, the Army Chief of Staff, who began to contemplate a palace coup against Hitler. He wanted, among other liberal aims, to avoid war and bring back "peace with the church". The back down of the Western Powers over the Sudeten crisis was a diplomatic triumph for Hitler, and the conspiracy did not progress. Carl Goerdeler wondered if anything could now oppose "the growing dangers to our Christian world", and the dispirited would-be conspirators were muted when Hitler marched into the remainder of Czechoslovakia in 1939. The early course of war stirred some of the conspirators back into action. But many resistors rallied to the cause of Germany when Hitler invaded Poland, Bishop Galen among them, who offered a patriotic benediction. But with the defeat of Poland, and undoing of the last "injustices" of Versailles, many Opposition members could no longer see a need to continue the war, and looked to ways to negotiate a peace, and to oust Hitler. Hamerow wrote that the "decline of the anti-Nazi movement during the period of German military successes from 1939 to 1941 and its revival during the period of German military reverses from 1942 to 1944 reflected the primary concern of most of the resistors for the security of their nation."

==== Pius XII and the Resistance ====
In Rome, the Pope had continued to lobby world leaders for the avoidance of a conflict up until the very eve of war, and expressed his dismay that war had come in his October 1939 Summi Pontificatus encyclical. With Poland overrun but France and the Low Countries yet to be attacked, Colonel Hans Oster of the Abwehr sent Munich lawyer and devout Catholic, Josef Müller, on a clandestine trip to Rome to seek Papal assistance in the developing plot by the German military opposition to oust Hitler. The Pope's Private Secretary, Robert Leiber acted as the intermediary between Pius and the Resistance. He met with Müller, who visited Rome in 1939 and 1940. Later in the war, Leiber remained the point of contact for communications from Colonel-General Ludwig Beck in the lead up to the 1944 July Plot.

The Vatican considered Müller to be a representative of Colonel-General von Beck and agreed to offer the machinery for mediation. Oster, Wilhelm Canaris and Hans von Dohnányi, backed by Beck, told Müller to ask Pius to ascertain whether the British would enter negotiations with the German opposition which wanted to overthrow Hitler. The British agreed to negotiate, provided the Vatican could vouch for the opposition's representative. Pius, communicating with Britain's Francis d'Arcy Osborne, channelled communications back and forth in secrecy. The Vatican agreed to send a letter outlining the bases for peace with England and the participation of the Pope was used to try to persuade senior German Generals Halder and Brauchitsch to act against Hitler.

Negotiations were tense, with a Western offensive expected, and on the basis that substantive negotiations could only follow the replacement of the Hitler regime. Hoffmann wrote that, when the Venlo Incident stalled the talks, the British agreed to resume discussions primarily because of the "efforts of the Pope and the respect in which he was held. Chamberlain and Halifax set great store by the Pope's readiness to mediate." Pius, without offering endorsement, advised Osbourne on 11 January 1940 that the German opposition had said that a German offensive was planned for February, but that this could be averted if the German generals could be assured of peace with Britain, and not on punitive terms. If this could be assured, then they were willing to move to replace Hitler. The Pope admitted to "discomfort" at his role as mediator, but advised that the Germans involved were not Nazis. The British government had doubts as to the capacity of the conspirators. On 7 February, the Pope updated Osbourne that the opposition wanted to replace the Nazi regime with a democratic federation, but hoped to retain Austria and the Sudetenland. The British government was non-committal, and said that while the federal model was of interest, the promises and sources of the opposition were too vague. Nevertheless, the resistance was encouraged by the talks, and Muller told Leiber that a coup would occur in February. Pius appeared to continue to hope for a coup in Germany into March 1940.

The negotiations ultimately proved fruitless. Hitler's swift victories over France and the Low Countries deflated the will of the German military to resist Hitler. Muller was arrested during the Nazis first raid on Military Intelligence in 1943. He spent the rest of the war in concentration camps, ending up at Dachau.

==== July Plot ====
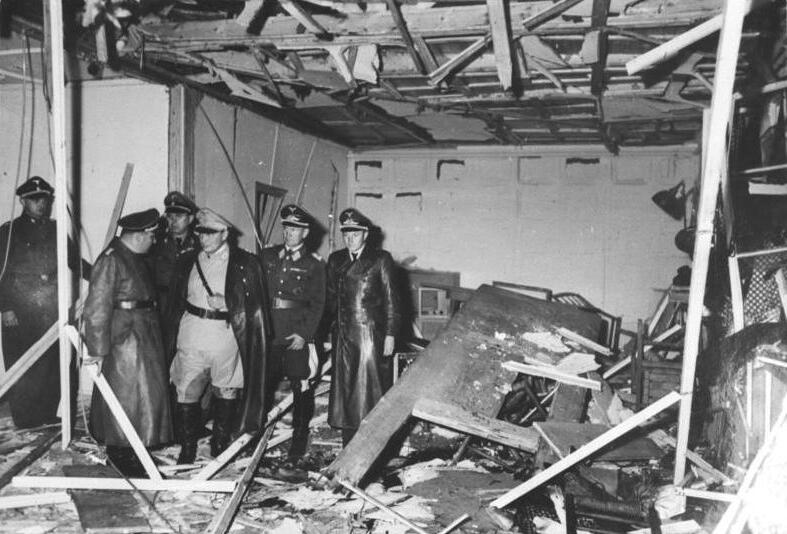
The Wolf's Lair conference room soon after the failed assassination of Hitler. The Nazi oppression of the churches was a motivating factor for the involvement of Stauffenberg and other leading conspirators in the July Plot.

On 20 July 1944, an attempt was made to assassinate Adolf Hitler, inside his Wolf's Lair field headquarters in East Prussia. The plot was the culmination of the efforts of several groups in the German Resistance to overthrow the Nazi-led German government. The failure of both the assassination and the military coup d'état which was planned to follow it led to the arrest of at least 7,000 people by the Gestapo. According to records of the Führer Conferences on Naval Affairs, 4,980 of these were executed. During interrogations or their show trials a number of the conspirators cited the Nazi assault on the churches as one of the motivating factors for their involvement. The Protestant clergyman Eugen Gerstenmaier said that the key to the entire resistance flowed from Hitler's evil and the "Christian duty" to combat it.

The Bavarian Catholic Count Claus Von Stauffenberg, had initially looked favourably on the arrival of the Nazis in power, but came to oppose the regime because of its persecution of the Jews and oppression of the church. In 1944, he led the 20 July plot (Operation Valkyrie) to assassinate Hitler. He had joined the resistance in 1943, and commenced planning coup, in which he personally placed a time bomb under Hitler's conference table. Killing Hitler would absolve the German military of the moral conundrum of breaking their oath to the Fuehrer. Faced with the moral and theological question of tyrannicide, Stauffenberg conferred with Bishop Konrad von Preysing and found affirmation in early Catholicism, and through Luther. In the lead up to the assassination, Stauffenberg had taken to reciting Stefan George's poem The Antichrist, which, wrote Fest, suggested he had elevated "resistance into a sacred deed".

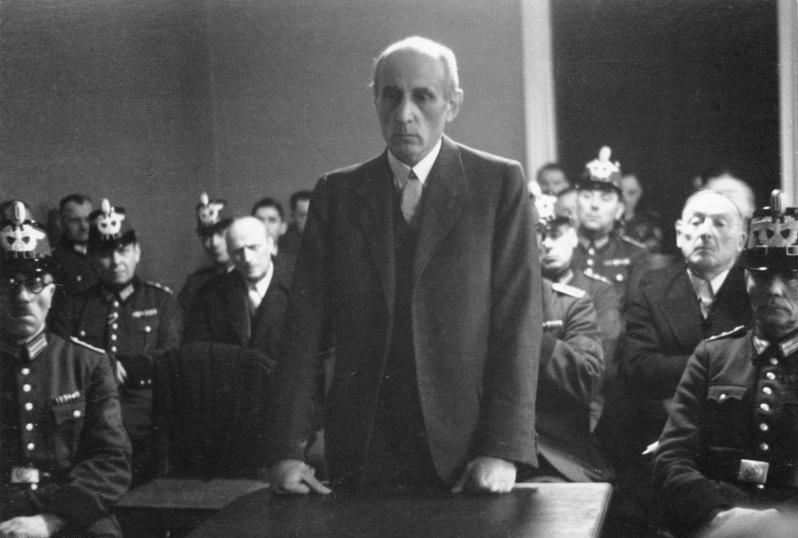
Catholic politician Eugen Bolz at the People's Court. Staatspräsident of Württemberg in 1933, he was overthrown by the Nazis. Later arrested for his role in the 20 July Plot to overthrow Hitler, he was beheaded in January 1945.

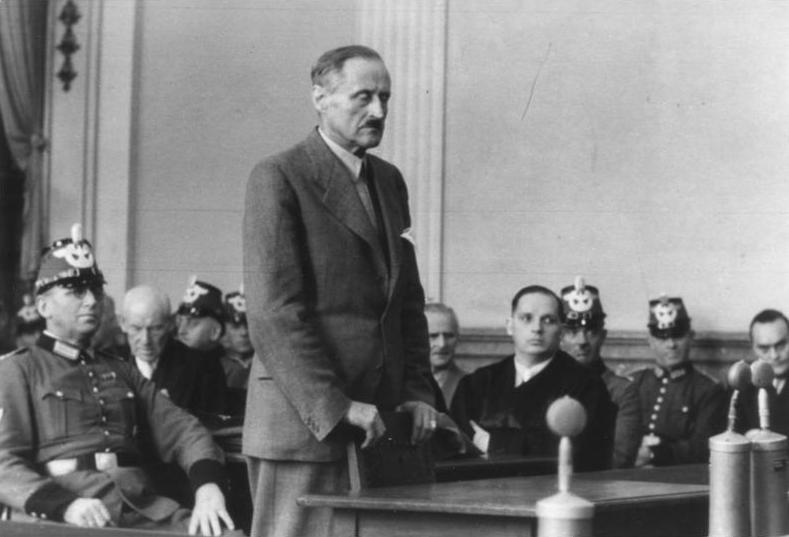
Catholic Centre Party politician Josef Wirmer (far right) in the People's Court, 1944. Wirmer has worked to forge ties between the German Resistance and the trade unions.

The planned Cabinet which was to replace the Nazi regime included Catholic politicians Eugen Bolz, Bernhard Letterhaus, Andreas Hermes and Josef Wirmer. Wirmer was a member of the left of the Centre Party, had worked to forge ties between the civilian resistance and the trade unions and was a confidant of Jakob Kaiser – a leader of the Christian trade union movement, which Hitler had banned after taking office. Lettehaus was also trade union leader. As a captain in the Oberkommando der Wehrmacht (Supreme Command), he had gathered information and become a leading member of the resistance. The proposed radio announcement of the failed July putsch of 1944 revealed the Godly outlook of the leading conspirators:

Let us once again tread the path of justice, decency and mutual respect! In this spirit each of us will do his duty. Let us follow the commands of God which are engraved on our conscience, even when them seem hard to us: let us do everything to heal wounded souls and alleviate suffering.

— Proposed radio broadcast to follow the July Plot against Hitler of 1944.

Following the failure of the plot, Stauffenberg was shot and Moltke, Yorck and Delp, among others, were executed. Philipp von Boeselager, the last surviving member of the conspiracy, wrote that Catholicism influenced anti Nazi feeling in the German army – to such an extent that Christmas celebrations in the army were banned in 1943. Author Nigel Jones believed that Catholicism and Christian conscience were central to Stauffenberg's decision to move against Hitler. 5000 people were tortured and killed over the plot – and the Gestapo linked a number of Bishops to knowledge of the German Resistance: Von Galen, Von Faulhaber, Frings, and Johannes Dietz of Fulda – though did not arrest the men.

== From the Vatican ==
Two Popes served through the Nazi period: Pope Pius XI (1922–1939) and Pope Pius XII (1939–1958). The Holy See strongly condemned Nazism through the late 1920s and throughout the 1930s, with Cardinal Pacelli (later Pope Pius XII) being a particularly outspoken critic. However, following the outbreak of war, Vatican pronouncements became more guarded and Rome pursued its ancient policy of neutrality and openness to the role of peacebroker. During the war, Pius XII was praised by Western media as a "lonely voice" against tyranny in Europe and scorned by Hitler as a "Jew lover" and a blackmailer on his back, whom he believed constricted his ally Mussolini and leaked confidential German correspondence to the world.

=== Pope Pius XI ===
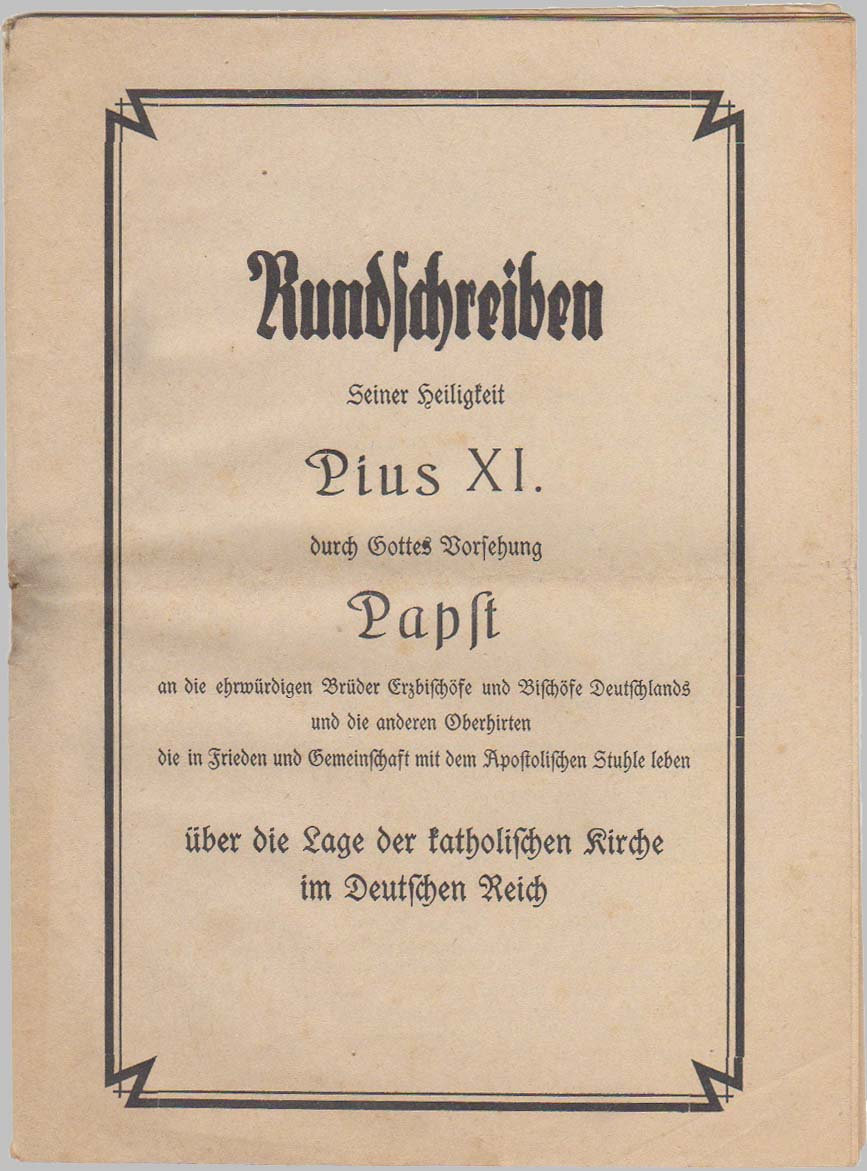
Pope Pius XI issued the anti-Nazi encyclical Mit brennender Sorge in 1937. It was in part drafted by his successor pontiff, Cardinal Pacelli (Pius XII).

The pontificate of Pius XI coincided with the early aftermath of the First World War. The old European monarchies had been largely swept away and a new and precarious order formed across the continent. In the East, the Soviet Union arose. In Italy, the Fascist dictator Benito Mussolini took power, while in Germany, the fragile Weimar Republic collapsed with the Nazi seizure of power.

In 1929, Pius signed the Lateran Treaty and a concordat with Italy, confirming the existence of an independent Vatican City state, in return for recognition of the Kingdom of Italy and an undertaking for the papacy to be neutral in world conflicts. In 1933, Pius signed a Concordat with the Germany – hoping to protect the rights of Catholics under the Nazi government. The terms of the Treaty were not kept by Hitler. According to the Encyclopædia Britannica: "From 1933 to 1936 [Pius XI] wrote several protests against the Third Reich, and his attitude toward fascist Italy changed dramatically after Nazi racial policies were introduced into Italy in 1938."

Pius XI saw the rising tide of Totalitarianism with alarm and delivered three papal encyclicals challenging the new creeds: against Italian Fascism Non abbiamo bisogno (1931; We Do Not Need to Acquaint You); against Nazism Mit brennender Sorge (1937; "With Deep Anxiety") and against atheist Communist Divini redemptoris (1937; "Divine Redeemer"). He also challenged the extremist nationalism of the Action Francaise movement and anti-semitism in the United States.

Non abbiamo bisogno condemned Italian fascism's "pagan worship of the State" and "revolution which snatches the young from the Church and from Jesus Christ, and which inculcates in its own young people hatred, violence and irreverence."

Pius XI's Secretary of State, Cardinal Pacelli (future Pius XII), made some 55 protests against Nazi policies, including its "ideology of race". As Cardinal Pacelli, Pope Pius XII had assisted Pius XI, draft the Mit brennender Sorge encyclical powerful critique of Nazi ideology. Pius XI commissioned the American Jesuit John La Farge to draft an encyclical demonstrating the incompatibility of Catholicism and racism: Humani generis unitas ("The Unity of the Human Race"). Following the death of Pius XI however, the less confrontational Pius XII did not issue the encyclical. He feared it would antagonize Fascist Italy and Nazi Germany at a time where he hoped to act as an impartial peace broker.

==== Mit brennender Sorge ====
By early 1937, the church hierarchy in Germany, which had initially attempted to co-operate with the new government, had become highly disillusioned. In March, Pope Pius XI issued the Mit brennender Sorge (German: "With burning concern") encyclical. The Pope asserted the inviolability of human rights and expressed deep concern at the Nazi regime's flouting of the 1933 Concordat, its treatment of Catholics and abuse of Christian values. It accused the government of "systematic hostility leveled at the Church" and of sowing the "tares of suspicion, discord, hatred, calumny, of secret and open fundamental hostility to Christ and His Church" and Pius noted on the horizon the "threatening storm clouds" of religious wars of extermination over Germany.

The Vatican had the text smuggled into Germany and printed and distributed in secret. Bishop Konrad von Preysing was an advisor in the drafting of the document. Cardinal Pacelli (later Pope Pius XII) also helped draft the encyclical, which was written partly in response to the Nuremberg Laws. The document does not refer to Hitler or the Nazis by name, but condemned racial theories and the mistreatment of people based on race.

Written in German, not the usual Latin, it was read from the pulpits of all German Catholic churches on one of the church's busiest Sundays, Palm Sunday. According to Gill, "Hitler was beside himself with rage. Twelve presses were seized, and hundreds of people sent either to prison or the camps."

=== Pope Pius XII ===
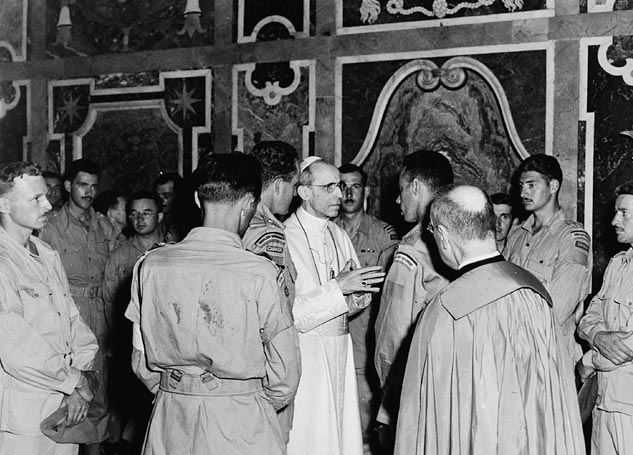
Members of the Canadian Royal 22e Regiment in audience with Pope Pius XII, following the 1944 Liberation of Rome

With Europe on the brink of war, Pius XI died on 10 Feb 1939 and Cardinal Pacelli was elected to succeed him as Pope Pius XII. As Vatican Secretary of State, Pacelli had been a critic of Nazism and the Nazi Government was the only government not to send a representative to his coronation. Pius, a cautious diplomat, pursued the course of diplomacy to attempt to convince European leaders to avoid war. In his first encyclical, Summi Pontificatus, which came only a month into the war, Pius condemned the war against Poland and looked to its "resurrection".

==== Encyclicals ====
Summi Pontificatus

Summi Pontificatus was the first papal encyclical issued by Pope Pius XII, in October 1939 and established some of the themes of his pontificate. During the drafting of the letter, the Second World War commenced with the Nazi/Soviet invasion of Catholic Poland – the "dread tempest of war is already raging despite all Our efforts to avert it". In a challenge to Nazism, the papal letter denounced racism, anti-semitism, war, totalitarianism, the attack on Poland and the persecution of the church. Pius reiterated church teaching on the "principle of equality" – with specific reference to Jews: "there is neither Gentile nor Jew, circumcision nor uncircumcision". The forgetting of solidarity "imposed by our common origin and by the equality of rational nature in all men" was called "pernicious error". Catholics everywhere were called upon to offer "compassion and help" to the victims of the war. The Pope declared determination to work to hasten the return of peace and trust in prayers for justice, love and mercy, to prevail against the scourge of war. The letter also decried the deaths of noncombatants.

Following themes addressed in Non abbiamo bisogno (1931); Mit brennender Sorge (1937) and Divini Redemptoris (1937), Pius wrote of a need to bring back to the church those who were following "a false standard ... misled by error, passion, temptation and prejudice, [who] have strayed away from faith in the true God". Pius wrote of "Christians unfortunately more in name than in fact" showing "cowardice" in the face of persecution by these creeds, and called for resistance:

Who among "the Soldiers of Christ" – ecclesiastic or layman – does not feel himself incited and spurred on to a greater vigilance, to a more determined resistance, by the sight of the ever-increasing host of Christ's enemies ... who ... wantonly break the Tables of God's Commandments to substitute other tables and other standards stripped of the ethical content of the Revelation on Sinai, standards in which the spirit of the Sermon on the Mount and of the Cross has no place?

— Pope Pius XII, Summi Pontificatus – 20 October 1939

Pius wrote of a persecuted church and a time requiring "charity" for victims who had a "right" to compassion. (Note: "In the midst of this world which today presents such a sharp contrast to "The Peace of Christ in the Reign of Christ," the church and her faithful are in times and in years of trial such as have rarely been known in her history of struggle and suffering".) Against the invasion of Poland and killing of civilians he wrote:

[This is an] "Hour of Darkness" ... in which the spirit of violence and of discord brings indescribable suffering on mankind ... The nations swept into the tragic whirlpool of war are perhaps as yet only at the "beginnings of sorrows" ... but even now there reigns in thousands of families death and desolation, lamentation and misery. The blood of countless human beings, even noncombatants, raises a piteous dirge over a nation such as Our dear Poland, which, for its fidelity to the Church, for its services in the defense of Christian civilization, written in indelible characters in the annals of history, has a right to the generous and brotherly sympathy of the whole world, while it awaits, relying on the powerful intercession of Mary, Help of Christians, the hour of a resurrection in harmony with the principles of justice and true peace.

— Pope Pius XII, Summi Pontificatus – 20 October 1939

With Italy not yet an ally of Hitler in the war, Italians were called upon to remain faithful to the church. Pius avoided explicit denunciations of Hitlerism or Stalinism, establishing the "impartial" public tone which would become controversial in later assessment of his pontificate: "A full statement of the doctrinal stand to be taken in face of the errors of today, if necessary, can be put off to another time unless there is disturbance by calamitous external events; for the moment We limit Ourselves to some fundamental observations."

Mystici corporis Christi

Later in the war Pius issued Mystici corporis Christi (29 June 1943) on the subject of the Roman Catholic Church as the Mystical Body of Christ. It followed the commencement of Nazi Germany's programs of "euthanasia" of disabled people, and race-based murders of Jews and other minorities, and is therefore significant for its reiteration of church teachings against racism and the killings of people with disabilities.

Pius' statement of "profound grief at the murder of the deformed, the insane, and those suffering from hereditary disease ... as though they were a useless burden to Society" was a condemnation of the ongoing Nazi euthanasia program, under which disabled Germans were being removed from care facilities and murdered by the state as "life unworthy of life". It built upon the high-profile condemnations offered by the Archbishop of Münster, August von Galen and others. It was followed, on 26 September 1943, by an open condemnation by the German Bishops which, from every German pulpit, denounced the killing of "innocent and defenceless mentally handicapped, incurably infirm and fatally wounded, innocent hostages, and disarmed prisoners of war and criminal offenders, people of a foreign race or descent".

==== Vatican media and information services ====
Pope Pius used the Vatican newspaper, L'Osservatore Romano and the new medium of radio to preach peace, and infuriated the Axis Powers. He established the Vatican Information Service to provide aid to, and information about, war refugees. He used radio to preach against selfish nationalism and the evils of modern warfare. The Nazis considered Vatican Radio to be anti-German, and Germans were forbidden to listen to it. At the outbreak of the war, Guido Gonella, the chief columnist of the Vatican newspaper, L'Osservatore Romano, was arrested. Following strenuous protests by the Vatican Secretary of State, he was released and given Vatican citizenship, but spent the rest of the war under close surveillance.

Vatican Radio

Vatican Radio was the mouthpiece of the Vatican, but was officially run by the Jesuits, who were in turn commanded by the Polish count Wladimir Ledachowski. Hebblethwaite wrote that the Nazis "regarded the German Jesuits to be their main enemy within, as Pius's Secretary, [the German Jesuit] Robert Leiber, as a traitor". In January 1940, the Pope authorised the details of the Polish situation to be broadcast on Vatican Radio's German service. The German ambassador protested the German language broadcasts, and the Pope directed a pause. Other language services were still more explicit, leading the British press to hail Vatican Radio as "tortured Poland's" powerful advocate.

Following the Pope's first war time Christmas address of 1939, Goebbels noted in his diary: "The Pope has made a Christmas speech. Full of bitter, covert attacks against us, against the Reich, and against National Socialism. All the forces of internationalism are against us. We must break them".

The Nazis considered Vatican Radio to be anti-German, and Germans were forbidden to listen to it. In broadcasts to Spain and France, it denounced the "wickedness of Hitler" and Nazi racial theories and lies. In his Easter 1941 radio address, the Pope denounced "atrocious forms of fighting and mistreatment of prisoners and civilians". Following the Pope's 1941 Christmas address,The New York Times editorial wrote that Pius had placed himself squarely against Hitlerism: "The voice of Pius XII is a lonely voice in the silence and darkness enveloping Europe this Christmas."

1942 Christmas address

By 1942, the Nazis had commenced their industrialized slaughter of the Jews of Europe—the Final Solution. Gypsies and others were also marked for extermination. In his Christmas address of that year, Pius acknowledged the genocide. He again warned against the evils of worshipping the state, and forced labor and addressed the racial persecutions in the following terms:"Humanity owes this vow to those hundreds of thousands who, without any fault on their part, sometimes only because of their nationality or race, have been consigned to death or to a slow decline". The New York Times called Pius "a lonely voice crying out of the silence of a continent." The speech was made in the context of the near total domination of Europe by the armies of Nazi Germany at a time when the war had not yet turned in favour of the Allies. Holocaust historian, Sir Martin Gilbert, assesses the response of the Reich Security Main Office calling Pius a "mouthpiece" of the Jews in response to his Christmas address, as clear evidence that all sides knew that Pius was one who was raising his voice for the victims of Nazi terror.

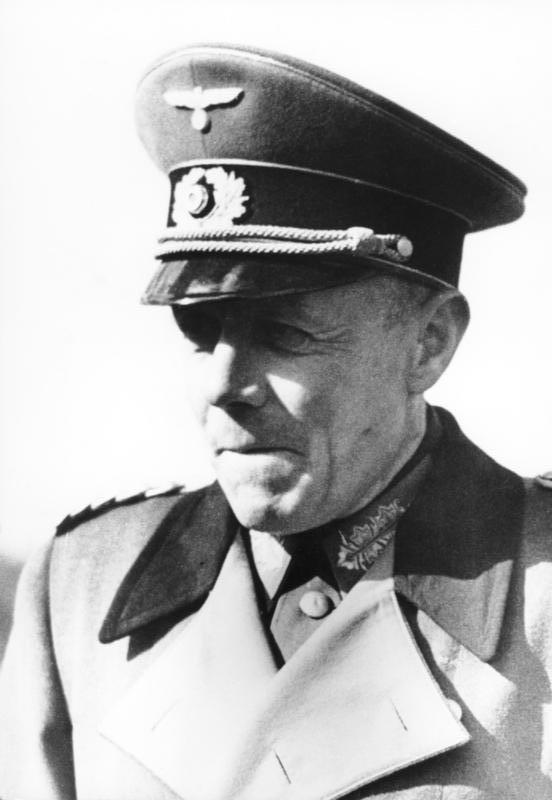
Colonel General Ludwig Beck, a key figure in the German Resistance, secretly advised the Pope of plots against Hitler through emissaries.

Holocaust

Following Archbishop Jules-Géraud Saliège's pastoral letter condemning Nazi anti-Semitism, L'Osservatore Romano praised Saliege, and Vatican Radio broadcast the letter. Bishop Pierre-Marie Theas's expression of outrage at "The present anti-Semitic measures" and the French bishops' joint protest against Jewish deportations received full coverage in l'Osservatore Romano and on Vatican Radio. In June 1943, Vatican Radio broadcast to France: "He who distinguishes between Jews and other men is unfaithful to God and is in conflict with God's command" and to Germany on the rights of Jews under natural law and a defence of Yugoslav Jews.

==== Aid to German Resistance and Allies ====
Following the outbreak of war, Pius followed Vatican precedent and pursued a policy of "impartiality" and sought to act as an intermediary peace broker. Despite this official policy, Pius passed intelligence to the Allies and made a series of condemnations of racism and genocide through the course of the war. Germany regarded Pius as an Allied sympathizer who had violated his own policy of neutrality.

With Poland overrun but France and the Low Countries yet to be attacked, Colonel Hans Oster of the Abwehr sent Munich lawyer and devout Catholic, Josef Müller, on a clandestine trip to Rome to seek Papal assistance in the developing plot by the German military opposition to oust Hitler. The Pope's Private Secretary, Robert Leiber acted at the intermediary between Pius and the Resistance. He met with Müller, who visited Rome in 1939 and 1940. Later in the war, Leiber remained the point of contact for communications from Colonel-General Ludwig Beck in the lead up to the 1944 July Plot. The Vatican considered Müller to be a representative of Colonel-General von Beck and agreed to offer the machinery for mediation. The British agreed to negotiate, provided the Vatican could vouch for the opposition's representative. Pius, communicating with Britain's Francis d'Arcy Osborne, channelled communications back and forth in secrecy. The Vatican agreed to send a letter outlining the bases for peace with England and the participation of the Pope was used to try to persuade senior German Generals Halder and Brauchitsch to act against Hitler.

Hoffmann wrote that, when the Venlo Incident stalled the talks, the British agreed to resume discussions primarily because of the "efforts of the Pope and the respect in which he was held. Chamberlain and Halifax set great store by the Pope's readiness to mediate." The British government had doubts as to the capacity of the conspirators and was non-committal. Nevertheless, the resistance were encouraged by the talks, and Muller told Leiber that a coup would occur in February. The negotiations ultimately proved fruitless. Hitler's swift victories over France and the Low Countries deflated the will of the German military to resist Hitler. Muller was arrested during the Nazis first raid on Military Intelligence in 1943. He spent the rest of the war in concentration camps, ending up at Dachau.

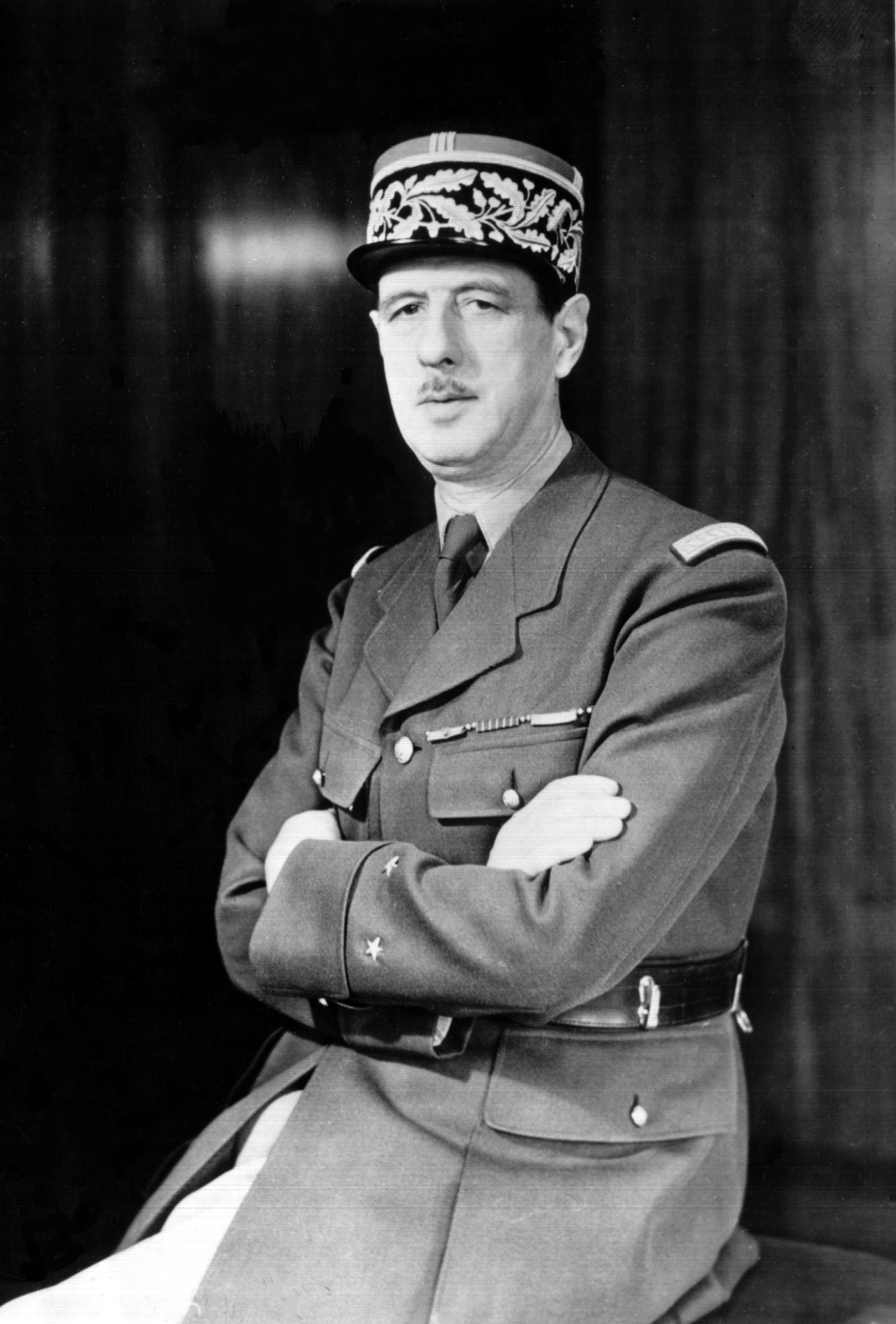
General Charles de Gaulle, leader of the Free French, and admirer of Pope Pius XII, met with the pontiff following the Liberation of Rome.

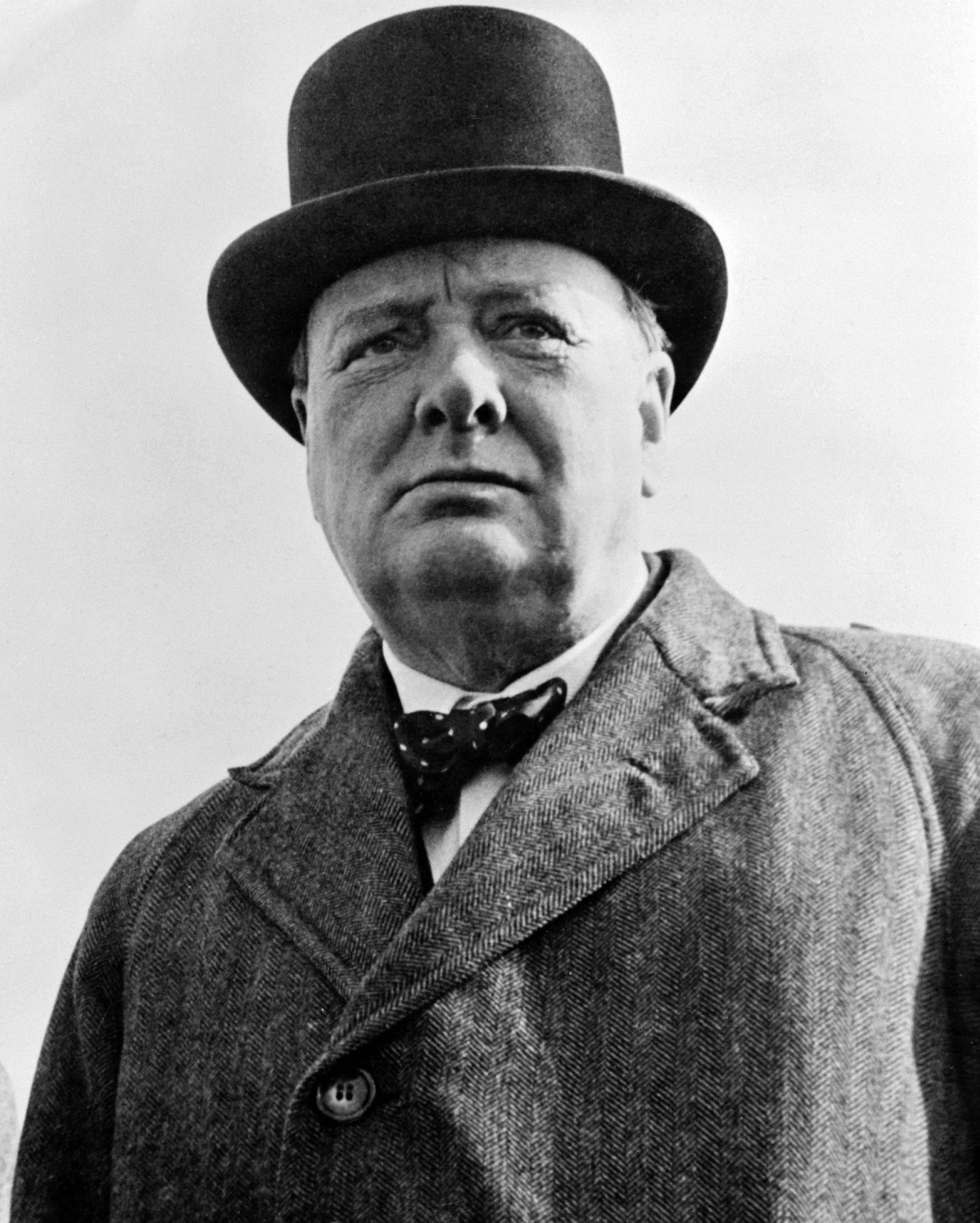
British Prime Minister, Winston Churchill, also had an audience with the Pope following the Liberation of Rome. Pius never met with Hitler, despite a long diplomatic career.

At a special mass at St Peters for the victims of the war, held in November 1940, soon after the commencement of the London Blitz bombing by the Luftwaffe, Pius preached in his homily: "may the whirlwinds, that in the light of day or the dark of night, scatter terror, fire, destruction, and slaughter on helpless folk cease. May justice and charity on one side and on the other be in perfect balance, so that all injustice be repaired, the reign of right restored ..." Later he appealed to the Allies to spare Rome from aerial bombing, and visited wounded victims of the Allied bombing of 19 July 1943.

Relations with leaders of the Axis and Allies

Through the early stages of the war, Pius continued to hope for a negotiated peace to prevent the spread of the conflict. The similarly minded US President Franklin D. Roosevelt re-established American diplomatic relations with the Vatican after a seventy-year hiatus and dispatched Myron C. Taylor as his personal representative. Pius warmly welcomed Roosevelt's envoy and peace initiative, calling it "an exemplary act of fraternal and hearty solidarity ... in defence against the chilling breath of aggressive and deadly godless anti-Christian tendencies".

On 4 May 1940, the Vatican advised the Netherlands envoy to the Vatican that the Germans planned to invade France through the Netherlands and Belgium on 10 May. In Rome in 1942, US envoy Myron C. Taylor, thanked the Holy See for the "forthright and heroic expressions of indignation made by Pope Pius XII when Germany invaded the Low countries".

When, in 1940, the Nazi Foreign Minister von Ribbentrop led the only senior Nazi delegation permitted an audience with Pius XII and asked why the Pope had sided with the Allies, Pius replied with a list of recent Nazi atrocities and religious persecutions committed against Christians and Jews, in Germany, and in Poland, leading the New York Times to headline its report "Jews Rights Defended" and write of "burning words he spoke to Herr Ribbentrop about religious persecution".

Unsuccessfully, Pius attempted to dissuade the Italian Dictator Benito Mussolini from joining Nazi Germany in the war. Following the Fall of France, Pius XII wrote confidentially to Hitler, Churchill and Mussolini proposing to offer to mediate a "just and honourable peace", but asking to receive confidential advice in advance of how such an offer would be received. When, by 1943, the war had turned against the Axis Powers, and Mussolini's Foreign Minister Count Ciano was relieved of his post and sent to the Vatican as ambassador, Hitler suspected that he had been sent to arrange a separate peace with the Allies. On 25 July, the Italian King dismissed Mussolini. Hitler's told Jodl to organise for a German force to go to Rome and arrest the Government and restore Mussolini. Asked about the Vatican, Hitler said: "I'll go right into the Vatican. Do you think the Vatican embarrasses me? We'll take that over right away ... later we can make apologies". His generals urged caution, and the plot was not carried out.

Pius had met President Roosevelt before the war. Despite profound fears of Stalinist Totalitarianism, Pius assured American Catholics working in armaments factories that it was acceptable to assist Russia with armaments, as the Russian people had been attacked. Pius feared the consequences of the Yalta Agreement which secured a sphere of Soviet influence in Europe and his church became the target of Communist repression in Eastern Europe, following the war. When Italy surrendered to the Allies in 1943, German troops occupied Rome. Thousands of anti-fascists and Jews took refuge in church buildings during the occupation. Pius declared Rome an "open city", coming to be known as defensor civitatis ("defender of the city").

Following the Liberation of Rome and prior to the collapse of Vichy France, Pius met General Charles de Gaulle, leader of the Free French. At this time, he also held an audience with the British Prime Minister, Winston Churchill. Despite his long career in Germany, and as a Vatican diplomat, he never once met Adolf Hitler. Following 4 June 1944 Liberation of Rome by the Allies, Cardinal Tisserant delivered a letter from De Gaulle, assuring the Pontiff of the filial respect and attachment of the French people, and noting that their long wartime suffering had been attenuated by the Pope's "testimonies of paternal affection". Pius thanked De Gaulle for his recognition of the charity works of the papacy for the victims of the war, and offered an Apostolic blessing upon De Gaulle and his nation. De Gaulle himself came to meet the Pope on 30 June, following which, the French leader wrote of great admiration for Pius, and assessed him to be a pious, compassionate and thoughtful figure, upon whom the problems of world situation weighed heavily. De Gaulle's visit was reported by the Vatican Press in the manner of a head of state, though the Vichy Regime had not yet been toppled.

== Outside Germany ==
=== Central Europe ===
==== Austria ====
Austria was overwhelmingly Catholic. At the direction of Cardinal Innitzer, the churches of Vienna pealed their bells and flew swastikas for Hitler's arrival in the city on 14 March. Cardinal Innitzer was called to Rome, where the pope rebuked him for his show of enthusiasm. Austrian bishop Alois Hudal published a book in 1937 praising the German ideal of racial unity. With power secured in Austria, the Nazis repeated their persecution of the church and in October, a Nazi mob ransacked Innitzer's residence, after he had denounced Nazi persecution of the church. In Britain, the Catholic Herald provided the following contemporary account on 14 October 1938:

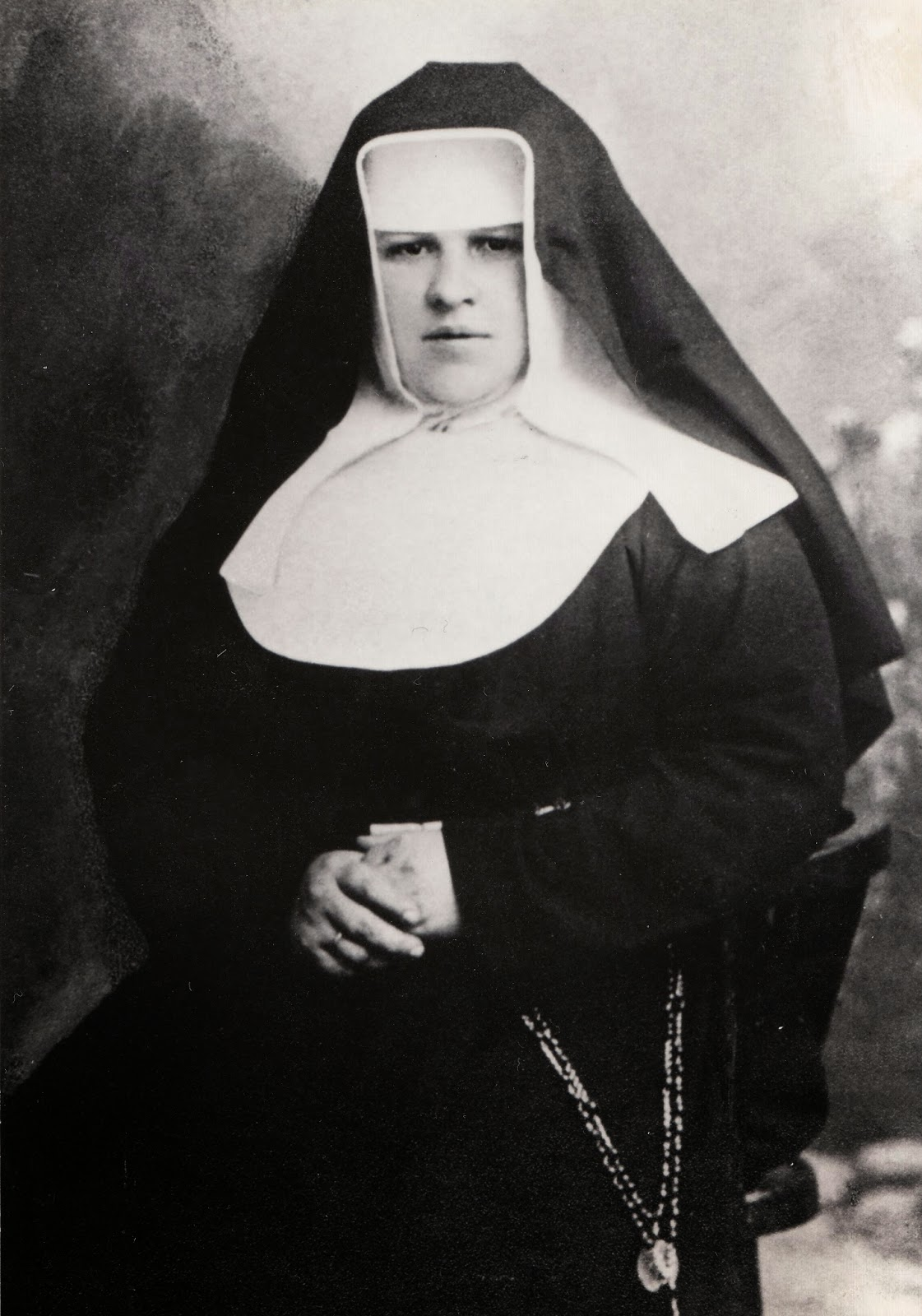
Maria Restituta was among the church dissidents arrested in Austria and executed by the Nazi regime.

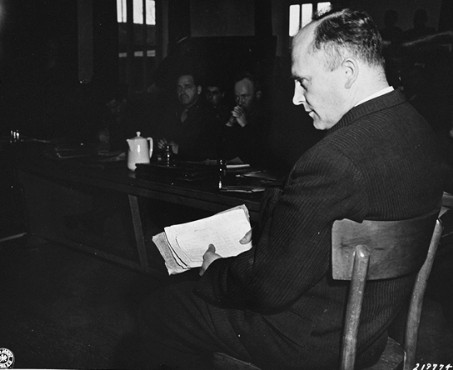
Friedrich Hoffman, a Czech priest, testifies at the trial of former camp personnel from Dachau, where over a thousand clergy were murdered. 122 Czechoslovak priests were imprisoned there, but Poles constituted the largest proportion of those imprisoned in the dedicated Clergy Barracks.

The invasion was a reply to a courageous sermon the Cardinal had preached in the Cathedral earlier in the evening, in which the Cardinal told his packed congregation that " in the last few months you have lost everything!' This sermon marked the end of Cardinal Innitzer's attempt to establish a religious peace with the Nazis. The attempt has failed. Cardinal Innitzer is now in line with his German brothers openly urging Catholics to resist anti-Catholic measures.

— Extract from Britain's Catholic Herald, Oct. 1938

In a "Table Talk" of July 1942 discussing his problems with the Catholic Church, Hitler singles out Innitzer's early gestures of cordiality as evidence of the extreme caution with which church diplomats must be treated: "there appeared a man who addressed me with such self-assurance and beaming countenance, just as if, throughout the whole of the Austrian Republic he had never even touched a hair of the head of any National Socialist!"

Following the Nazi annexation of Austria, many priests were arrested. The Austrian priests Jakob Gapp and Otto Neururer, both executed during the Third Reich were beatified in the 1996. Neururer was tortured and hanged at Buchenwald and Jakob Gapp was guillotined in Berlin.

Maria Restituta, a Franciscan nun working as a nurse at the Mödling hospital was outspoken in her opposition to the new Nazi regime, and refused to remove crucifixes from her hospital walls. Arrested by the Gestapo in 1942, she was beheaded in March 1943 in Vienna.

A Catholic resistance group led by the later executed chaplain Heinrich Maier very successfully resisted the Nazi regime. On the one hand, the group wanted to revive a Central European Habsburg confederation after the war and very successfully passed on plans and production facilities for V2, tiger tanks and aircraft to the Allies. This allowed the Allied bombers to target important armaments industries and spare residential areas. In contrast to many other German resistance groups, the Maier Group informed very early about the mass murder of Jews through their contacts with the Semperit factory near Auschwitz – a message the Americans in Zurich initially did not believe in the scope of. After the war, the group around Maier was largely forgotten and displaced by the Catholic Church. Much of its information was important to Operation Hydra and Operation Crossbow, both critical operations to Operation Overlord. Maier, who was often referred to as Miles Christi, supported the war against the Nazis on the principle "every bomb that falls on armaments factories shortens the war and spares the civilian population."

==== Czechoslovak area ====
Catholicism had had a strong institutional presence in the region under the Habsburg Dynasty, but Bohemian Czechs in particular had had a troubled relationship with the church of their Habsburg rulers. Despite this, According to Schnitker, "the Church managed to gain a deep-seated appreciation for the role it played in resisting the common Nazi enemy." 122 Czechoslovak Catholic priests were sent to Dachau Concentration Camp. 76 did not survive the ordeal. Following the outbreak of war, 487 priests were rounded up from occupied Czechoslovakia—among them the Canon of Vysehrad, Msgr. Bohumil Stašek. On 13 August 1939, Stašek had given a patriotic address to a 100,000 strong crowd of Czechoslovaks, criticising the Nazis: "I believed that truth would triumph over falsehood, law over lawlessness, love and compassion over violence". For his resistance efforts, Bohumil spent the remainder of the war in prison and the concentration camps.

Karel Kašpar, the Archbishop of Prague and Primate of Bohemia was arrested soon after the occupation of his city, after he refused to obey an order to direct priests not to discontinue pilgrimages. Kaspar was repeatedly arrested by the Nazi authorities and died in 1941. In announcing the Archbishop's death on radio, Josef Beran, the director of the Prague diocese main seminary, called on Czechs to remain true to their religion and to their country.

Reinhard Heydrich was appointed as Reich Protector (Governor) of Bohemia and Moravia. Heydrich was a fanatical Nazi antisemite and an anti-Catholic. One of the main architects of the Nazi Holocaust, he also believed that Catholicism was a threat to the state. He was assassinated by Czechoslovak commandos in Prague in 1942. Hitler was angered by the co-operation between the church and the assassins who killed Heydrich. Following the assassination of Heydrich, Josef Beran was among the thousands arrested, for his patriotic stance. Beran was sent to Dachau Concentration Camp, where he remained until Liberation, whereafter he was appointed Archbishop of Prague—a seat which had remained vacant since the death of Kašpar.

==== Poland ====
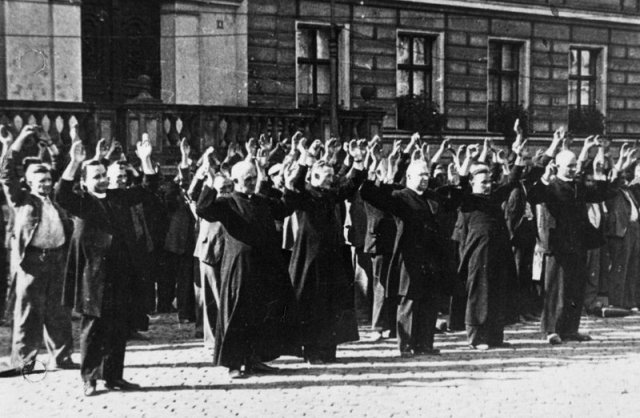
Public execution of Polish priests and civilians in Bydgoszcz's Old Market Square on 9 September 1939. The Polish Home Army was conscious of the link between morale and religious practice and the Catholic religion was integral to much Polish resistance.

The invasion of predominantly Catholic Poland by Nazi Germany in 1939 ignited the Second World War. Britain and France declared war on Germany as a result of the invasion, while the Soviet Union invaded the Eastern half of Poland in accordance with an agreement reached with Hitler. The Catholic Church in Poland was about to face decades of repression, both at Nazi and Communist hands. The Polish Home Army was conscious of the link between morale and religious practice and the Catholic religion was integral to much Polish resistance, particularly during the Warsaw Uprising of 1944. Hundreds of priests and nuns are among the 5000 Polish Catholics honoured by Israel for their role in saving Jews.

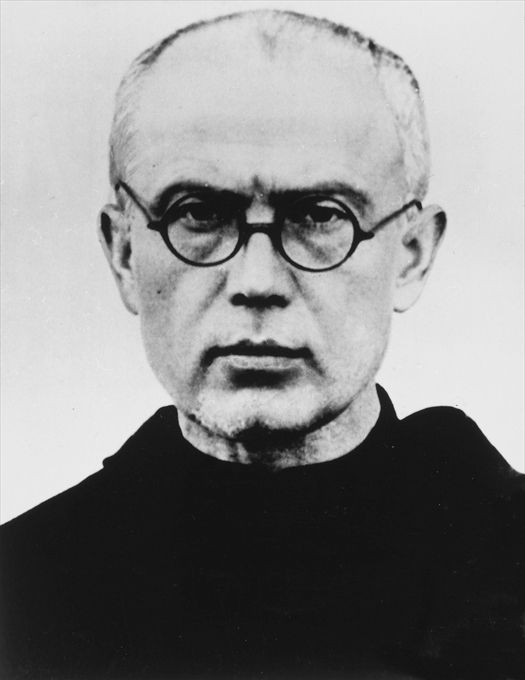
The Polish Franciscan Maximillian Kolbe was killed at Auschwitz.

German policy towards the church was at its most severe in the territories it annexed to Greater Germany. Here the Nazis set about systematically dismantling the Catholic Church – arresting its leaders, exiling its clergymen, closing its churches, monasteries and convents. Many clergymen were murdered. Elsewhere in occupied Poland, the suppression was less severe, though still harsh.

Adam Sapieha, Archbishop of Kraków, became the de facto head of the Polish church following the invasion. He openly criticised Nazi terror. One of the principal figures of the Polish Resistance, Sapieha opened a clandestine seminary in an act of cultural resistance. Among the seminarians was Karol Wojtyla, the future Pope John Paul II. Wojtyla had been a member of the Rhapsodic Theatre, an underground resistance group, which sought to sustain Polish culture through forbidden readings of poetry and drama performances.

1944 Uprising

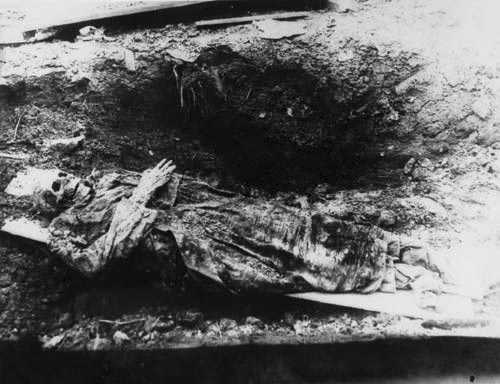
Dead body of the Jesuit Edward Kosibowicz, killed in the Massacre in the Jesuit monastery on Rakowiecka Street in Warsaw (1944)

Catholic religious fervour was a feature of the 1944 Warsaw Uprising. General Antoni Chruściel issued instructions on how front-line troops could continue to pray, recite the rosary and offer confession, and that religious festivals be celebrated. Churches were destroyed, but congregations were not deterred. The religious orders, particularly nuns, devoted themselves to praying for the Uprising. Clergy were involved on many levels – as chaplains to military units, or tending to the ever-increasing wounded and dying. "Nuns of various orders", wrote Davies, "acted as universal sisters of mercy and won widespread praise. Mortality among them higher than among most categories of civilians. When captured by the SS, they aroused a special fury, which frequently ended in rape or butchery". According to Davies, the Catholic religion was integral to the struggle:

Any description of the Rising which does not present the role of religion in the experiences both of soldiers and civilians is not worth reading. As death in all its forms grew ever more prevalent, the Roman Catholic religion, with its emphasis on redemption and its belief in the afterlife, grew ever more relevant. Religious observance stood at unusually high level throughout the Rising, among both insurgents and civilians. Priests held regular masses in all parts of the city, often in abbreviated open-air services among the ruins. They were on constant call to administer the last rites, and to conduct funerals ...

— Norman Davies, Rising '44: the Battle for Warsaw

Among the hundreds of chaplains attached to the Home Army was Stefan Wyszyński, who later served as Cardinal Primate of Poland in the Communist era. His parish of Laski was a centre of liberal Polish Catholicism, located in the area of operations of the Home Army's Kampinos Group. The religious communities in general remained during the Uprising, converting their crypts and cellars to bomb shelters and hospitals, and throwing themselves into social work. The enclosed Convent of the Benedictine Sisters of Eternal Adoration lifted a centuries-old ban on male visitors to serve as a strategic base for the Home Army and threw open its doors to refugees, who were nursed and fed by the sisters. The prioress received an ultimatum from the Germans, but refused to leave for fear of impact on morale. Davies wrote that the sisters began their evening prayers gathered around the tabernacle, surrounded by a thousand people, as German aircraft flew overhead and "the church collapsed in one thunderous explosion ... rescue teams dug to save the living ... a much diminished convent choir was singing to encourage them. At dawn a handful of nuns ... filed out. Lines of insurgents saluted. And the German guns reopened fire."

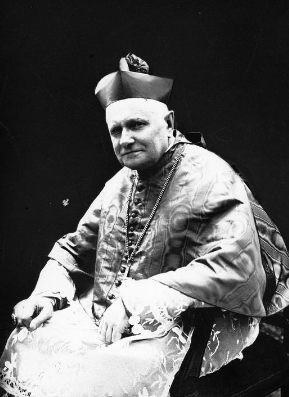
Rank did not protect Polish clergymen. Bishop Antoni Julian Nowowiejski met his death at Soldau concentration camp. He is remembered as one of the 108 Polish Martyrs of World War II.

108 Polish Martyrs

The Polish Church honours 108 Martyrs of World War II, including the 11 Sisters of the Holy Family of Nazareth murdered by the Gestapo in 1943 and known as the Blessed Martyrs of Nowogródek. The Polish church opened the cause of Józef and Wiktoria Ulma to the process of canonisation in 2003. The couple and their family were murdered for sheltring Jews. The midwife Stanisława Leszczyńska worked in the "maternity ward" at Auschwitz, defying Dr Joseph Mengele's order to murder the infants.

Among the most revered Polish martyrs was the Franciscan, Maximillian Kolbe, who died at Auschwitz-Birkenau, having offered his own life to save a fellow prisoner who had been condemned to death by the camp authorities. The cell in which he died is now a shrine. During the War he provided shelter to refugees, including 2,000 Jews whom he hid in his friary in Niepokalanów.

In Slonim, the Jesuit Adam Sztark rescued Jewish children by issuing back-dated Catholic birth certificates. He called on his parishioners to assist fleeing Jews and is believed to have secretly entered the Jewish ghetto to assist those inside. He was arrested by the Germans in December 1942, and shot.

=== Western Europe ===
==== Netherlands ====
The Nazi Occupation of the Netherlands was particularly protracted and saw a notably efficient cruelty towards the Jews, and harsh punishment for their protectors. While the Dutch civil service collaborated extensively with the occupying administration, the Dutch Church, and leaders like the Archbishop of Utrecht Johannes de Jong firmly opposed the National Socialist movement and Dutch Catholics were forbidden from joining it. When Jewish deportations began, many were hidden in Catholic areas. Parish priests created networks for hiding Jews and close knit country parishes were able to hide Jews without being informed upon by neighbours, as occurred in the cities. As a consequence of the Catholic protest against the Holocaust, converted Jewish Catholics, and especially those who had taken the cloth, were arrested and deported, among them Edith Stein, then a Carmelite nun. Especially in the bishopry of Roermond the opposition to the Nazis grew, and notable roles were played by Chaplain Jac. Naus and Curate Henri Vullings. They, and other priest such as the Roermond diocesan secretary Leo Moonen were especially active in helping escaped POW pilots from Nazi-Germany and hiding Jews.

A significant Dutch Catholic dissident was the Carmelite priest and philosopher, Titus Brandsma. Brandsma was a journalist and a founder of the Netherlands' Catholic University, who publicly campaigned against Nazism from the mid-1930s. Chosen by the Dutch Bishops as spokesmen in the defence of freedom of the press, he was arrested by the Nazi authorities in January 1942 – telling his captors: "The Nazi movement is regarded by the Dutch people not only as an insult to God in relation to his creatures, but also a violation of the glorious traditions of the Dutch nation. If it is necessary, we, the Dutch people, will give our lives for our faith." Transferred to the brutal Amersfoort penal depot, he continued to minister to the other prisoners and challenged them to pray for their captors. He was later transferred to Dachau Concentration camp, where he was the subject of Nazi medical experiments and was issued with a lethal injection on 26 July 1942. A total of 63 Dutch priest were incarcerated in the Dachau concentration camp. Of them, 17 died in the camp. In the KL Bergen-Belsen, 10 priests who had taken part in the Dutch resistance died. The official list in the Dutch houses of Parliament names 24 priests who died in Nazi hands.

==== Belgium ====
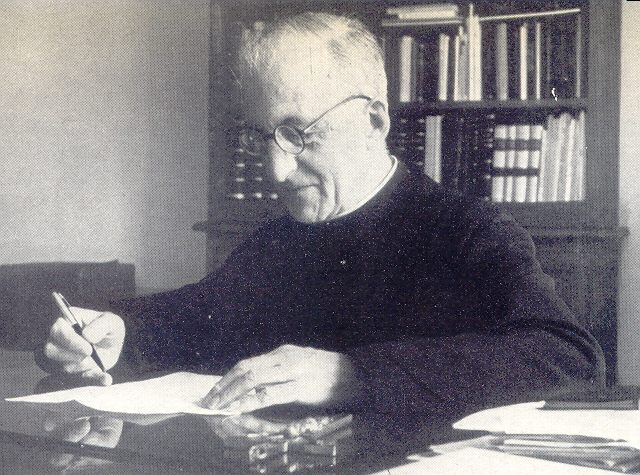
The Belgian Jesuit Jean-Baptiste Janssens served as Superior General of the Jesuits in Belgium and was honoured as Righteous Gentile by Yad Vashem.

The Belgian Catholic Church was one of the first national churches to speak out against Nazi racial theory. Church leaders like the conservative Jozef-Ernst Cardinal van Roey and the liberal Dom Bruno OSB opposed the rise of fascism in Belgium and the Nazi regime which occupied its country from 1940. Following the occupation, the church played an important role in the defence of Jews in Belgium. The Belgian Catholic Party was essentially a social democratic movement and the Belgian Fascist leader Léon Degrelle was excommunicated for wearing an SS uniform to Mass. Membership of the SS had been banned by the Belgian hierarchy for holding a pagan creed. Cardinal van Roey forbade Catholics from voting for the fascist movement in 1937. In KL Dachau, in total 46 Belgian priests were incarcerated, of them 9 did not survive.

==== France ====
Charles de Gaulle's Free French chose the red Cross of Lorraine as the symbol of their cause. The Cross had been the standard of the iconic French Catholic saint, Joan of Arc.

Predominantly Catholic France surrendered to Nazi Germany in 1940. Following the French defeat, the nation was divided in two, with the north governed by the occupying Germans, and the south established as Vichy France headed by the nationalist Marshal Philippe Pétain. In 1940, In the trauma of defeat, the church was concerned to preserve its existence and institutions. The Vichy regime hoped to maintain the position of France as a sovereign nation following the war. The church hierarchy sought accommodation with the new regimes but the relationship between the governments and the church deteriorated over the course of the war. Though Marshal Pétain himself had no religious convictions, he courted Catholic support. In contrast, his great rival, and leader of the Free French, General Charles de Gaulle was a devout Catholic. To rally the French to their cause, de Gaulle's Free French chose Joan of Arc's standard, the Cross of Lorraine as the symbol of Free France.

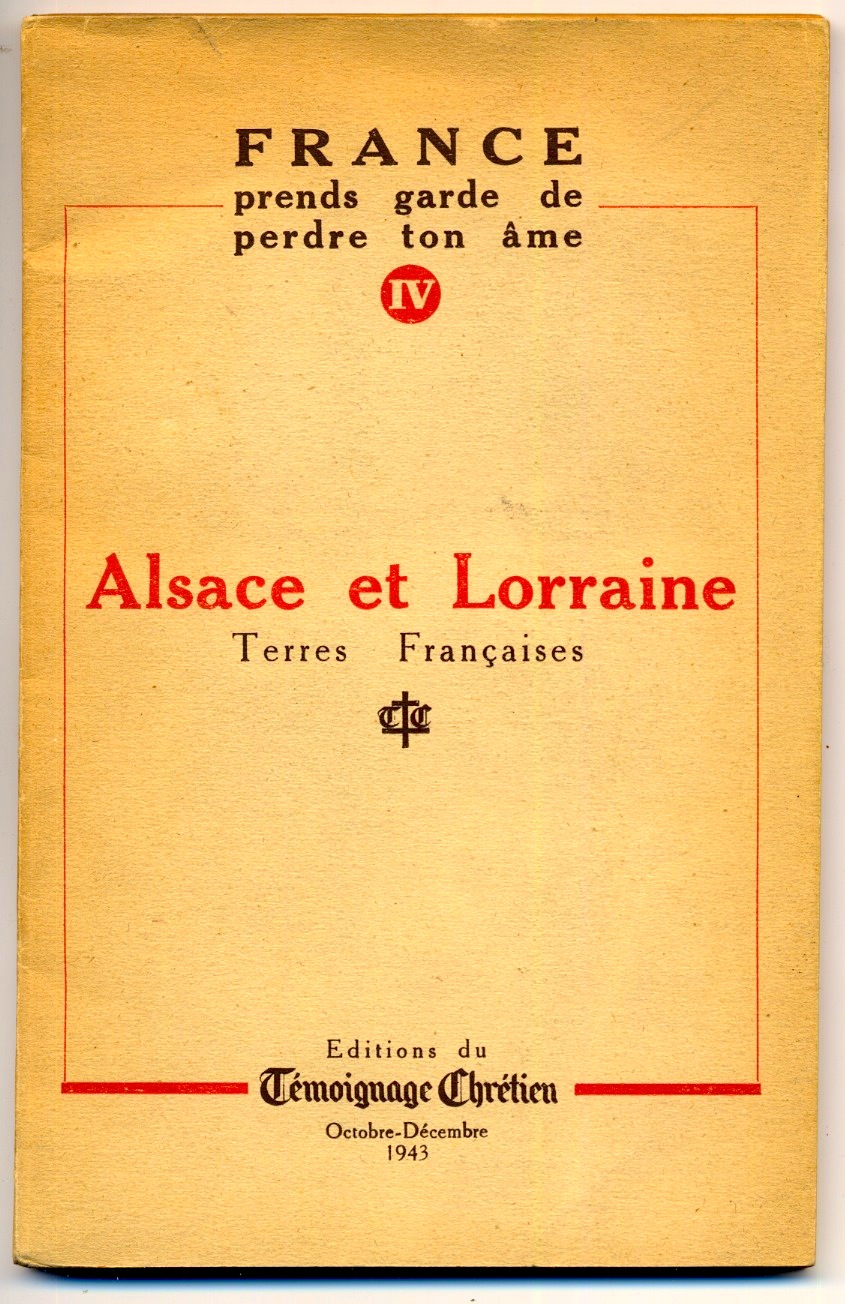
An edition of the Témoignage chrétien. The paper was published clandestinely by Pierre Chaillet and other Jesuits to offer "Spiritual Resistance to Hitlerism".

After initial public silence, significant Episcopal protests against the mistreatment of Jews began in France 1942, following the acceleration of anti-Jewish activities by the government. Many church organisations came to work to protect Jews from the Nazis, encouraged by the public declarations of Archbishop Jules-Géraud Saliège and others.

Notable Catholics involved in the French Resistance included the politician and lawyer François de Menthon, who had been president of the Action catholique de la Jeunesse française (French Catholic Action Youth Group) and helped found the Jeunesse ouvrière chrétienne (Young Christian Workers movement) before the war. Michel Riquet defied the Vichy regime, and helped more than 500 Allied pilots to escape from France, leading to his arrest by the Gestapo in January 1944 and imprisonment in Mauthausen and Dachau concentration camps. After returning to Paris, Riquet wore the striped uniform of the camps for his first sermon at Notre Dame.

Important figures in the French Resistance spirituelle included the Jesuit Pierre Chaillet who clandestinely produced the Cahiers du Témoignage chrétien ("Christian Witness" – an underground journal of Nazi resistance) and the martyrs Fernand Belot, Roger Derry and Eugene Pons. The Amitiés Chrétiennes organisation operated out of Lyon to secure hiding places for Jewish children. Among its members were the Jesuit Pierre Chaillet and Alexandre Glasberg. Other notable French Catholic resistors included Cardinal Tisserant, who called on the Vatican to forcefully condemn Nazism by name.

Jean Bernard of Luxembourg was imprisoned from May 1941 to August 1942 in the Nazi concentration camp at Dachau. A symbol of Luxembourg Catholic resistance to German occupation, he wrote the book Pfarrerblock 25487, about his experiences in Dachau, and his story was dramatized in the 2004 film The Ninth Day.

=== Nazi allies ===
==== Italy ====
In 1943, the Italian government, no longer under the helm of Mussolini, rejected Italian fascism and renounced its alliance with Germany, at which point (and, in fact, prior to the Italian renunciation of its alliance with Germany), Nazi Germany became an occupying force in Italy, actively invading much of Italy, killing and detaining Italian civilians, soldiers, and partisans; and fighting against the Italian Resistance. Catholic participation in the Italian Resistance was significant. Catholic Partisans were an important element of the Italian anti-fascist Resistance which took up the fight against Nazi Germany. The actions of Italian clergy and nuns, as well as the interventions of Pope Pius XII, saved thousands of Jews from deportation to Nazi death camps.

Around 4% of Resistance forces were formally Catholic organisations, but Catholics dominated other "independent groups" such as the Fiamme Verdi and Osoppo partisans.

As Italy lurched towards a civil war, the Vatican urged moderation. At Easter 1944, Italian bishops were directed from Rome to "stigmatise every form of hatred, of vendetta, reprisal and violence, from wherever it comes". 191 priests were murdered by fascists and 125 by the Germans, while 109 were murdered by partisans. Though some joined pro-fascist bands, the Vatican backed the so-called anti-Fascist 'partisan chaplains' and 'red priests' fighting with the partisans, hoping that they would provide religious guidance to partisans being exposed to Communist propaganda. Peter Hebblethwaite wrote that, by early 1944, some 20,000 partisans had emerged from Catholic Action, supported by sympathetic provincial clergy in the North, who pronounced the Germans to be "unjust invaders", whom it was lawful and meritorious to repel. "Bishops tended to be more cautious", wrote Hebblethwaite, Maurilio Fossati, the Cardinal Archbishop of Turin "visited partisan units in the mountains, heard their confessions and said Mass for them."

The armed Italian Resistance comprised a number of contingents of differing ideological orientation – the largest being the Communist Garibaldi Brigade. Along with Communist, socialist, and monarchist anti-fascists, the Catholic partisans conducted guerrilla warfare against the occupying German Army and Mussolini loyalists between 1943 and 1945. Enjoying wide popular support from the overwhelmingly Catholic population, the Partisans played an important role in the success of the Allied Advance through Italy.

Around 4% of Resistance forces were formally Catholic organisations, but Catholics dominated other "independent groups" such as the Fiamme Verdi and Osoppo partisans, and there were also Catholic militants in the Garibaldi Brigades, such as Benigno Zaccagnini, who later served as a prominent Christian Democrat politician. In Northern Italy, tensions between Catholics and Communists in the movement led Catholics to form the Fiamme Verdi as a separate brigade of Christian Democrats in Northern Italy. After the war, the ideological divisions between the partisans re-emerged, becoming a hallmark of post-war Italian politics.

When "unarmed resistance" is considered, the role of Catholics becomes even more significant: with hiding of fugitives such as Jews and Allied PoWs, sabotage, propaganda distribution, graffiti and failure to report for military duty. From within the Vatican, Monsignor Hugh O'Flaherty, operated the Rome Escape Lineoperation for Jews and Allied escapees. The churches, monasteries and convents of Assisi formed the Assisi Network and served as a safe haven for several hundred Jews during the German occupation. Catholic Convents and hospitals gave food and shelter to partisans, and some even stored arms, and, wrote Hebblethwaite, "Those who helped the partisans also helped the allied airmen escape ... They also concealed Jews, Franciscan Rufino Niccaci organized the convents of Assisi so that they not only concealed Jews but were the link in the escape line to Florence."

Salvo D'Acquisto, an Italian military policeman is remembered as a martyr of the period, having saved the lives of 22 villagers whom the Nazi SS intended to shoot in reprisal for an explosion. D'Acquisto convinced them he was responsible for the explosion, and so, at the age of 22, was executed in their place. The church has commenced the process of beatification for D'Acquisto. In Fiume, the Italian police chief, Giovanni Palatucci and his uncle, Bishop Giuseppe Palatucci saved 5000 Jews from deportation by providing documentation allowing them to pass to the safety of the bishop's diocese in the south. Giovanni was sent to Auschwitz and executed.

==== Hungary ====
Hungary joined the Axis nations during the war, in part with the hope of regaining territories it had lost at the close of the First World War. However, the Regent, Admiral Horthy, did not embrace Nazi ideology and had the support of the Papal Nuncio, Angelo Rotta, who was highly active the protection of Jews and named Righteous among the Nations by Yad Vashem after the war.

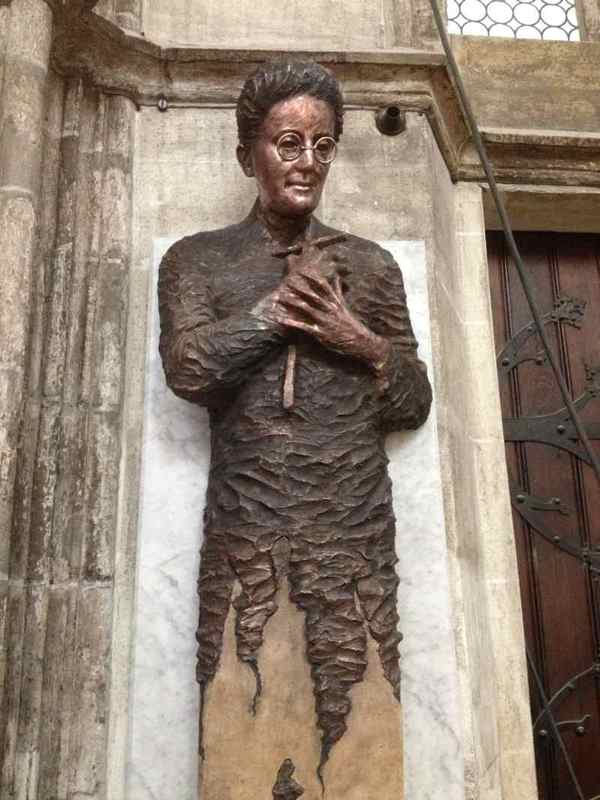
Sára Salkaházi was shot for sheltering Jews in 1944. She was a member of Margit Slachta's Hungarian Sisters of Social Service, who are credited with saving thousands of Jews.

Margit Slachta of the Hungarian Social Service Sisterhood became the first female elected to the Hungarian Parliament in 1920 and later engaged her sisters in the protection of Jews, and lobbied the leaders of the church to do the same. Slachta told her sisters that the precepts of their faith demanded that they protect the Jews, even if it led to their own deaths. One of Slachta's sisters, Sára Salkaházi, was among those captured sheltering the Jews, and executed by the Arrow Cross. Slachta herself was beaten and only narrowly avoided execution. The sisters rescued probably more than 2000 Hungarian Jews. In 1944 the Vatican acted to halt the deportation of the Jews of Hungary. Pius XII appealed directly by an open letter to Admiral Horthy to protect Hungary's Jews and brought international pressure to bare. Slachta also protested forced labour.

Under Cardinal Serédi, Hungary's bishops and Catholic institutions expressed opposition to Nazism. When Germany invaded Hungary in 1944, Mgr Rotta issued passports and baptismal certificates to Hungarian Jews and, with the encouragement of the Pope, repeatedly and publicly protested against their mistreatment and called for the repeal of racist laws. Francis Spellman, the Archbishop of New York, preached civil disobedience from Hungary's Catholics against Nazi anti-Semitism. Horthy cabled the Pope that he would work to stop the deportations of Jews and signed a peace agreement with the Allies – but was arrested by the Nazis, a Nazi government installed and the deportations were resumed. In 1944 Pius appealed directly to the Hungarian government to halt the deportation of the Jews of Hungary and his nuncio, Angelo Rotta, led a citywide rescue scheme in Budapest. Other leading church figures involved in the 1944 rescue of Hungarian Jews included Bishops Vilmos Apor, Endre Hamvas and Áron Márton. Primate József Mindszenty issued public and private protests and was arrested on 27 October 1944.

== Others ==
Angelo Roncalli (later Pope John XXIII) advised Pope Pius XII of the plight of Jews being kept in concentration camps in Romanian-occupied Transnistria. The Pope interceded with the Romanian government, and authorized for money to be sent to the camps. Andrea Cassulo, the papal nuncio to Bucharest has been honoured as Righteous among the Nations by Yad Vashem.

Archbishop Stepinac of Zagreb, originally sympathetic to the Croatian Ustase Government, came to be known as jeudenfreundlich (Jew friendly) to the Nazis and Croat regime. He suspended a number of priest collaborators in his diocese. In 1941, Pope Pius XII dispatched Giuseppe Marcone as Apostolic Visitor to Croatia, in order to assist Stepinac and the Croatian Episcopate in "combating the evil influence of neo-pagan propaganda which could be exercised in the organization of the new state". He reported to Rome on the deteriorating conditions for Croatian Jews, made representations on behalf of the Jews to Croatian officials, and transported Jewish children to safety in neutral Turkey.

== See also ==
- Persecutions of the Catholic Church and Pius XII
- Catholic Church and Nazi Germany
- Rescue of Jews by Poles during the Holocaust
- Rescue of Jews by Catholics during the Holocaust
- Jesuits and Nazi Germany
