= Catholic Church and Nazi Germany =

Nazi-era Catholics
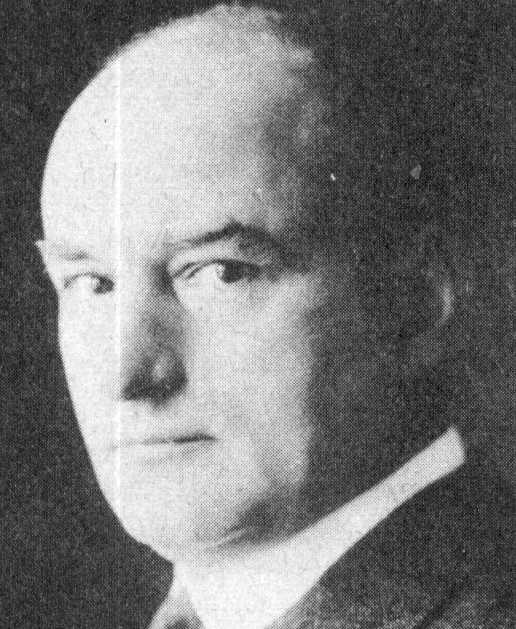
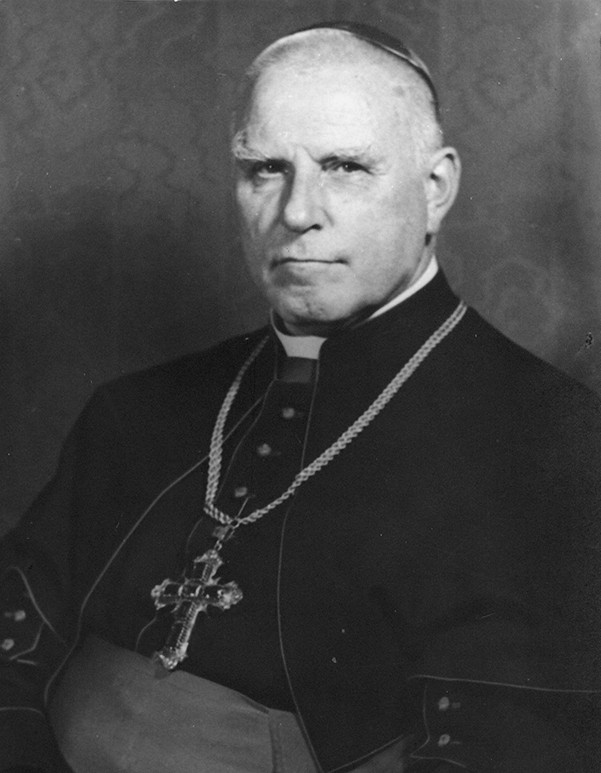
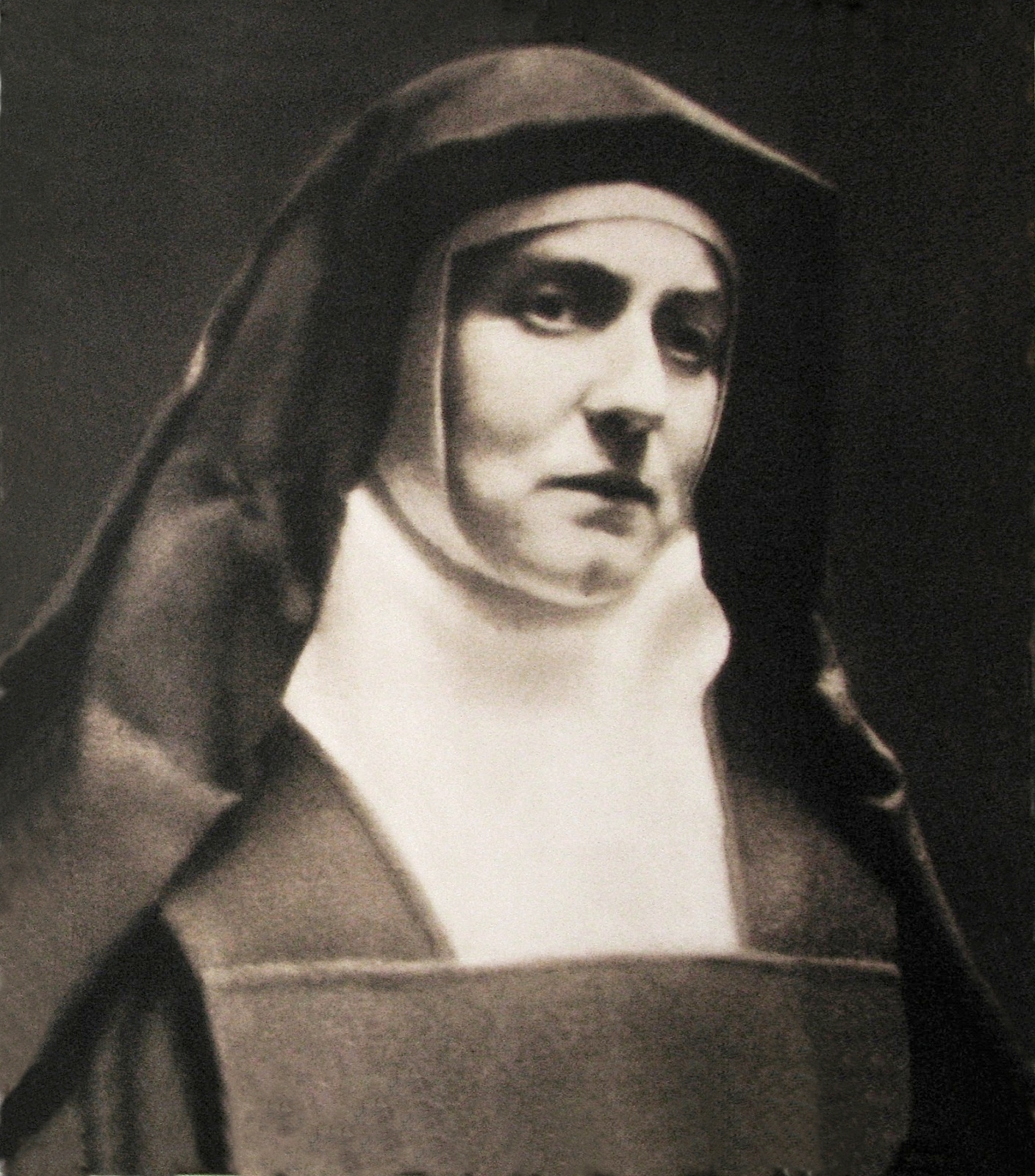
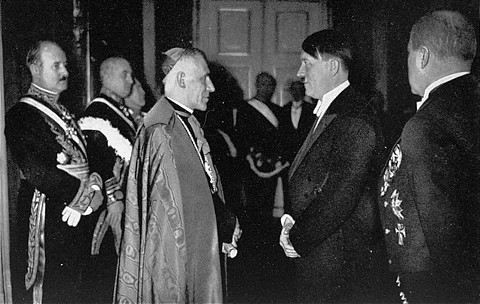
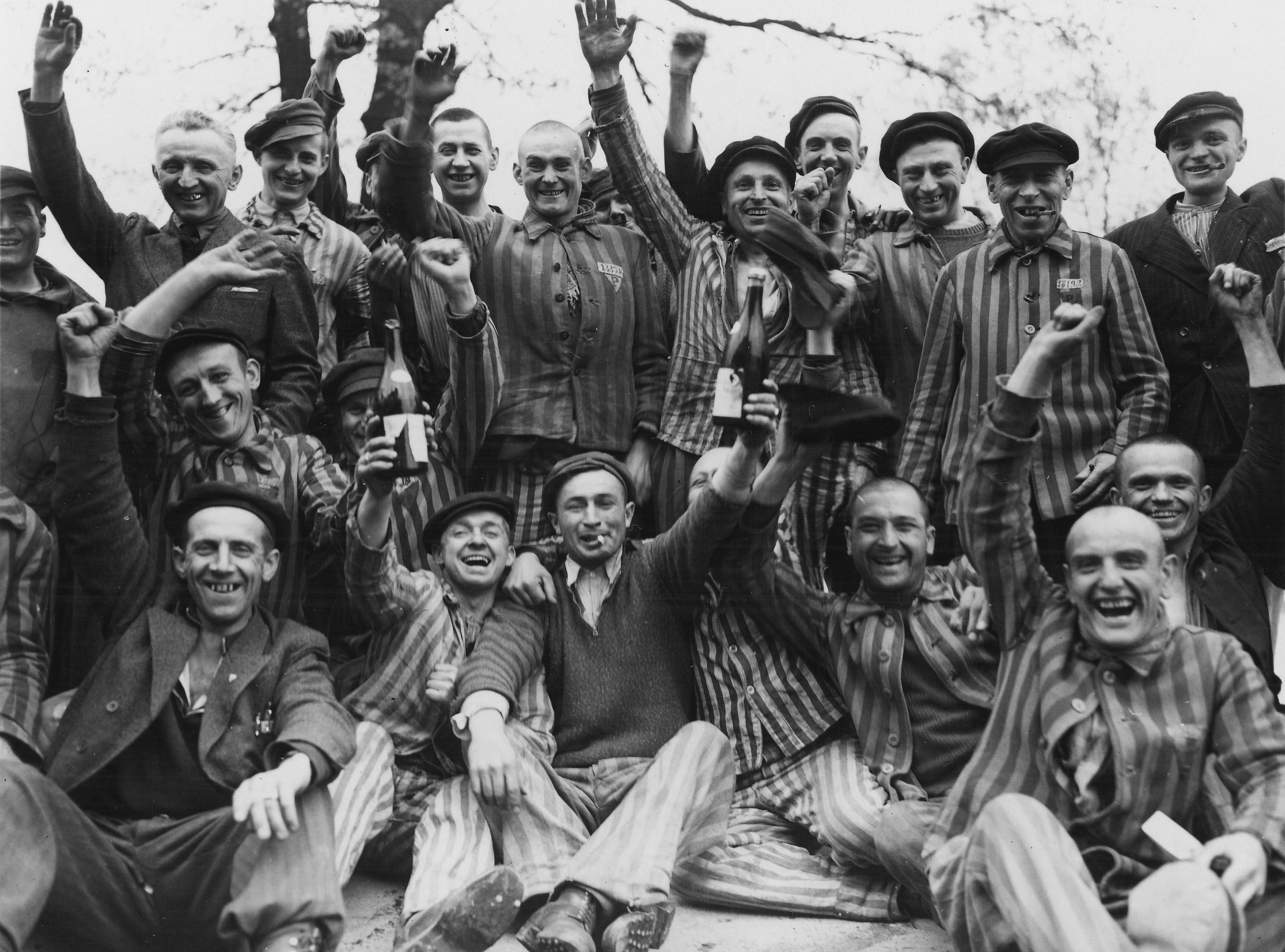
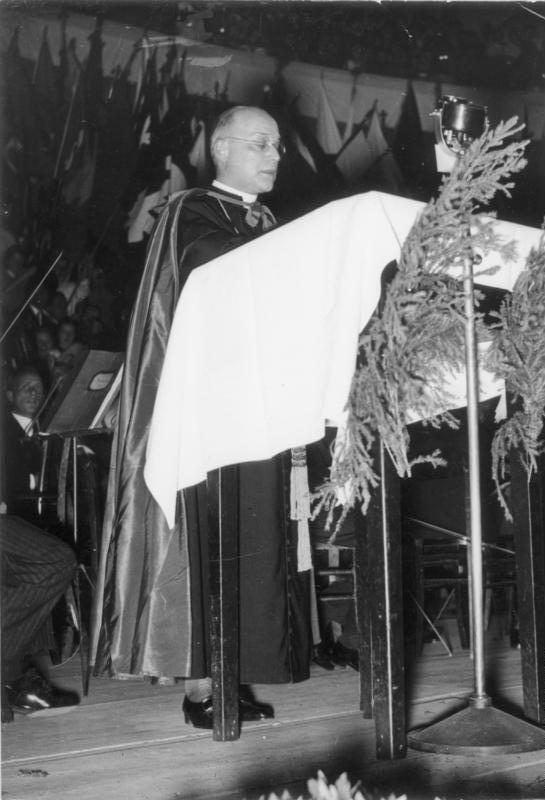
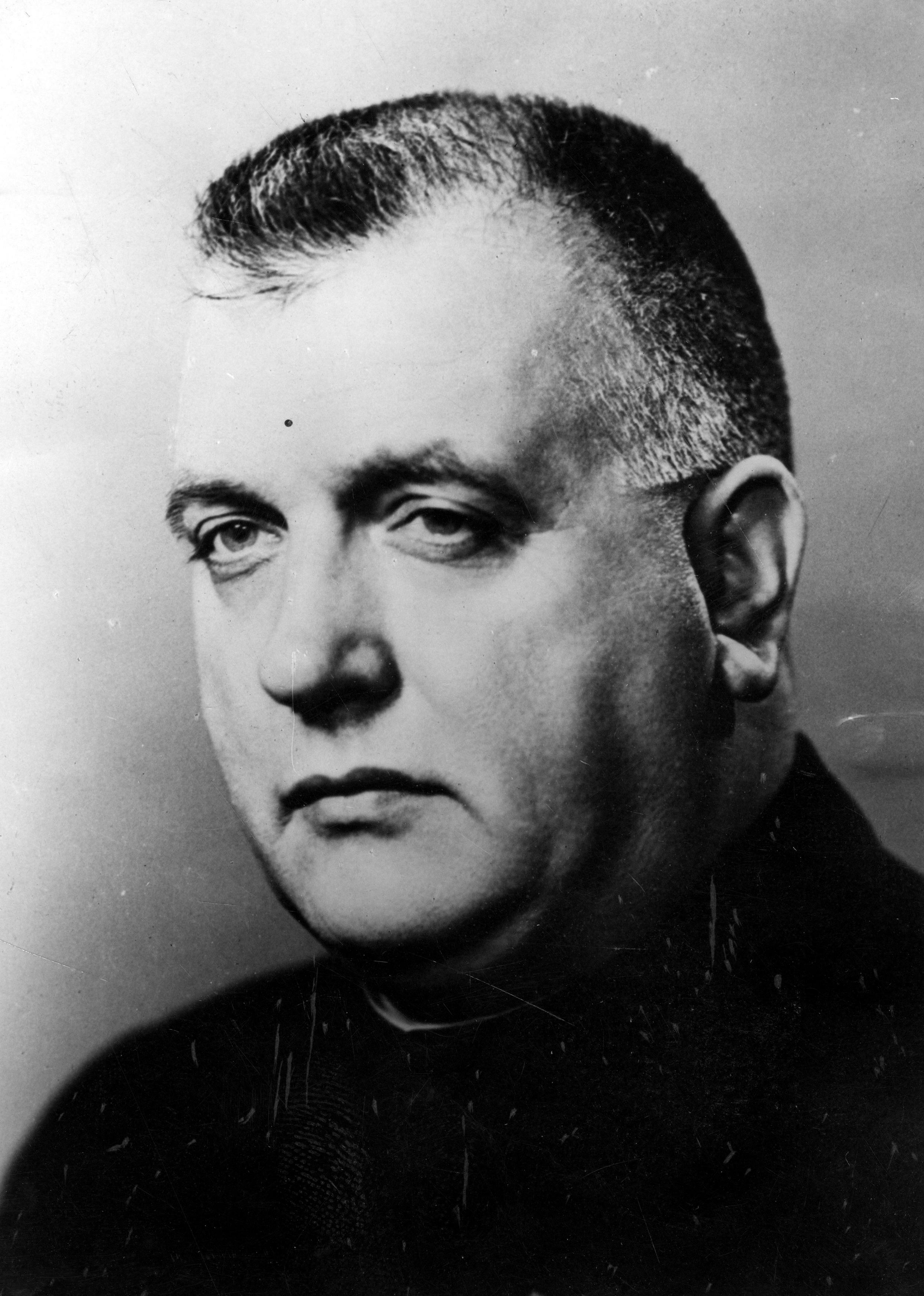
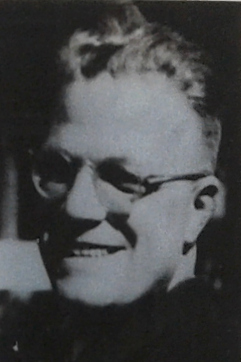
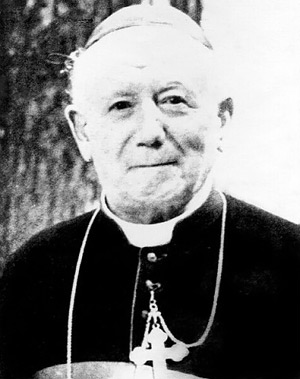
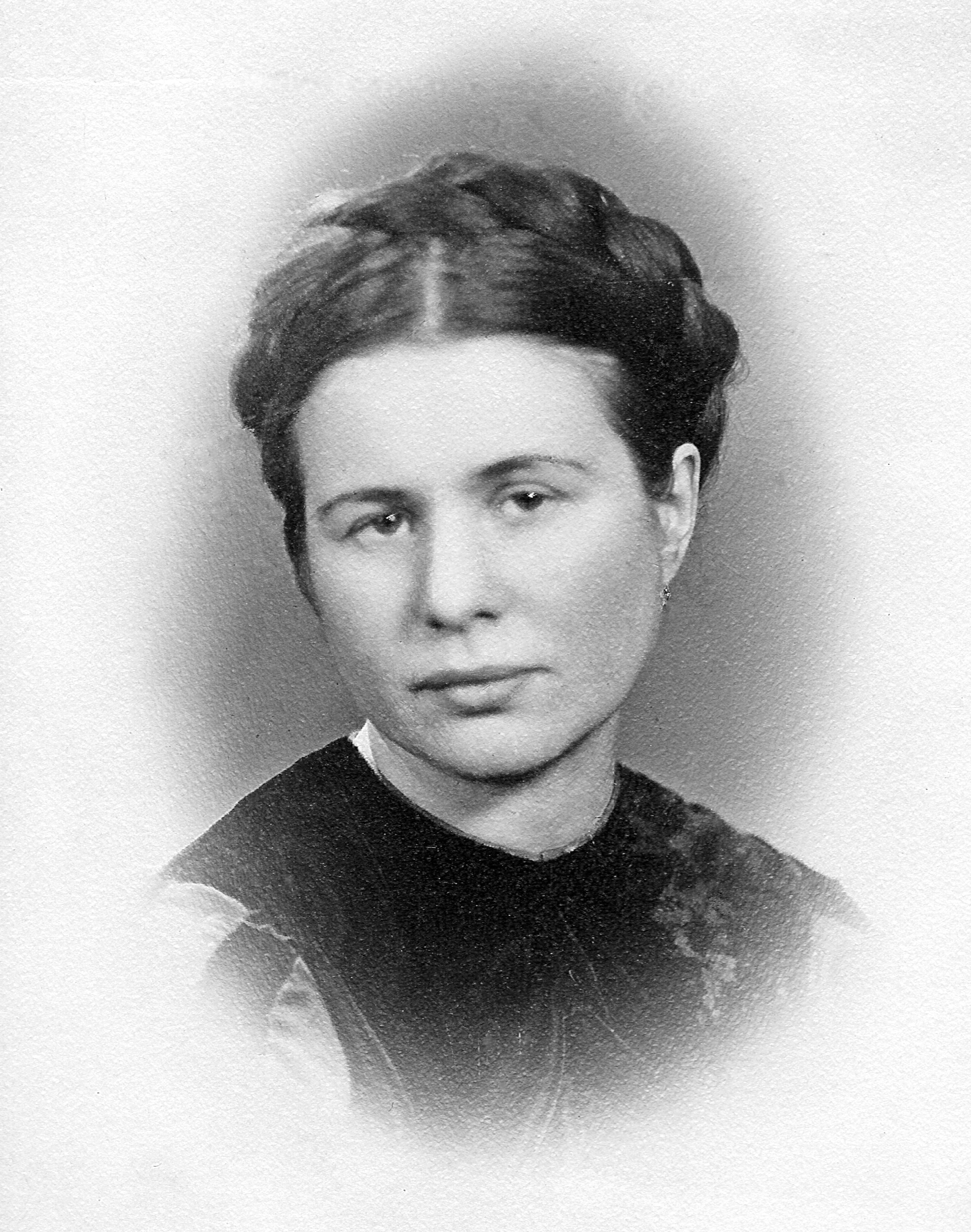
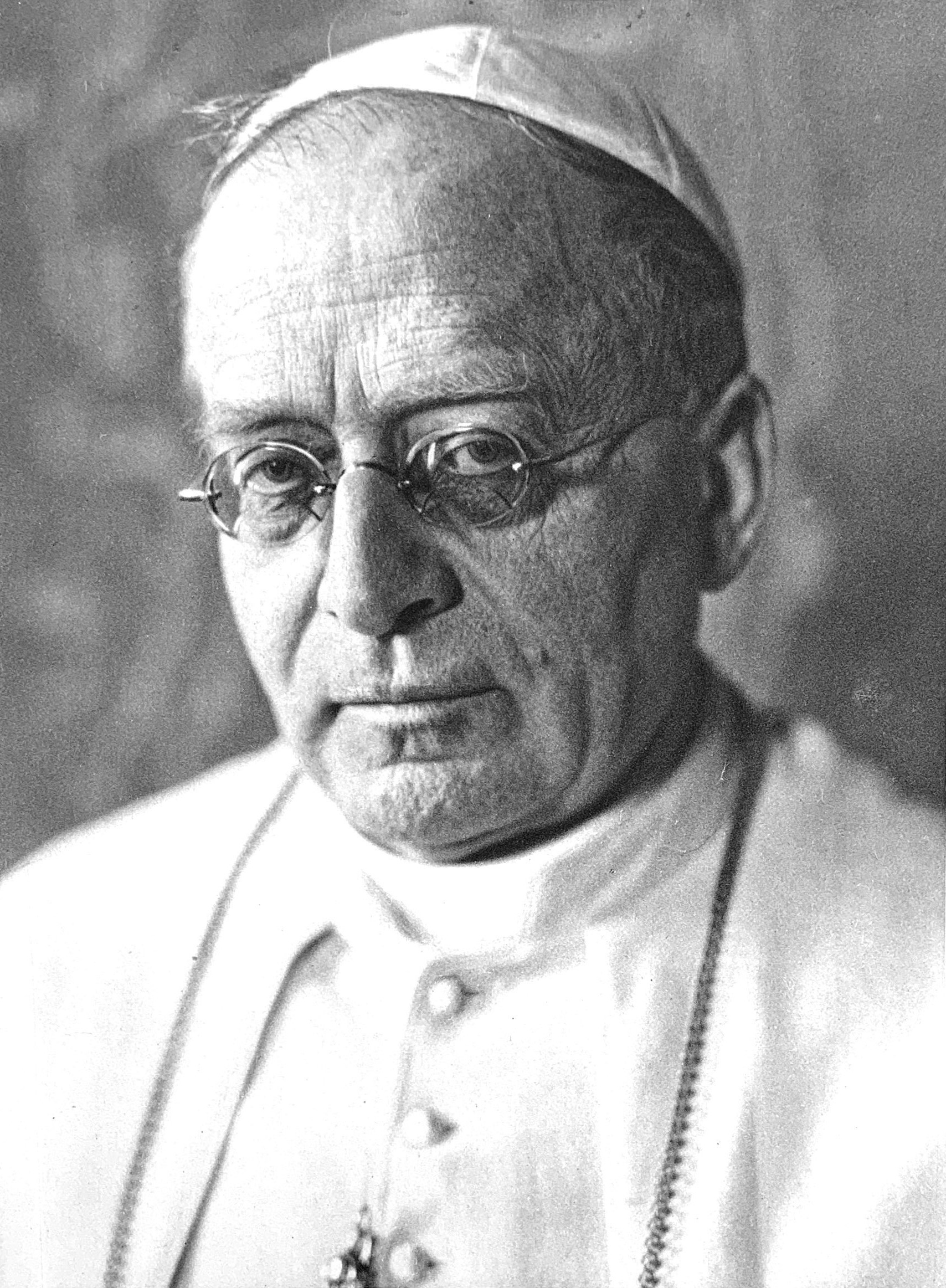
Top to bottom, left to right: Erich Klausener, Clemens August Graf von Galen, Edith Stein, Claus von Stauffenberg, Cesare Orsenigo, Polish prisoners at Dachau, Konrad von Preysing, Jozef Tiso, Alfred Delp, Jules-Géraud Saliège, Irena Sendler and Pope Pius XI.

The Catholic Church, led by Popes Pius XI (1922 to 1939) and Pius XII (1939 to 1958), confronted National Socialism from the rise of the Nazi Party through the Second World War. In the early 1930s, about one third of the German population was Catholic, and Catholic regions generally gave the Nazi Party lower electoral support than the national average. Although the Catholic-aligned Centre Party voted for the Enabling Act of 1933, the Church hierarchy and many Catholic leaders had criticized National Socialism since the 1920s, and numerous bishops issued formal condemnations of Nazi ideology.

The 1933 Reichskonkordat formally guaranteed Catholic rights, but the regime soon restricted Catholic institutions, closed schools and organizations, and targeted clergy and lay leaders, including those killed during the Night of the Long Knives. Pius XI's 1937 encyclical Mit brennender Sorge accused the government of violating the concordat and promoting hostility towards the Church. Persecution intensified in annexed and occupied territories during the war, particularly in Poland, Slovenia, and Austria, where many clergy were imprisoned or killed. Thousands of priests were held at Dachau, where more than 1,000 died.

Catholic responses to Nazism varied. Some clergy and laypeople resisted, while others remained passive. The Vatican used diplomatic channels to assist victims and advocate for peace, and Vatican Radio and other Catholic media outlets condemned Nazi atrocities. Historian Alan Bullock argued that the Church did not feel it was "possible to take up an attitude of open opposition to the regime", while Mary Fulbrook wrote that Christian belief often "proved compatible with at least passive acquiescence in, if not active support for, the Nazi dictatorship".

Catholics also played significant roles in rescuing Jews in several occupied countries by providing false documents, shelter, and diplomatic assistance. Pius XII's wartime actions remain debated, although he condemned racial persecution in public statements such as Summi Pontificatus and his 1942 Christmas Address. After the war, some individual clergy aided fleeing Nazis without institutional sanction, and the Vatican later acted to remove those involved.

== Overview ==
In the 1930s, about one third of the German population was Catholic, and political Catholicism remained an important force in the Weimar Republic. Catholic leaders criticized Nazi doctrine before 1933, and Catholic regions generally gave the Nazi Party lower electoral support than the national average. The Nazi Party first developed in largely Catholic Munich, where it initially attracted some Catholic backing, but this support declined after 1923. Following its reorganization in 1920, Nazism increasingly adopted positions hostile to Catholicism and by 1925 had a pronounced anti-Catholic character. In 1931, the German bishops endorsed a decision by the Bishop of Mainz to excommunicate Nazi leaders and to forbid Catholics in his diocese from joining the party, a measure that applied only to Catholics under his jurisdiction.

After the Nazi electoral gains of 1932, Franz von Papen's negotiations and Kurt von Schleicher's unsuccessful efforts to maintain a government helped create the political situation that led Paul von Hindenburg to appoint Adolf Hitler as Reich Chancellor. In March 1933, amid political pressure and intimidation following the Reichstag Fire Decree, the Centre Party (led by Ludwig Kaas), the Bavarian People's Party, and the German National People's Party (DNVP) voted for the Enabling Act after obtaining a written assurance that the president's veto power would be retained. The Centre Party's support was decisive, since the Nazi-DNVP coalition alone lacked the necessary votes, and the act marked Hitler's transition from constitutional chancellor to dictatorial rule. By June 1933, the military and the churches were the only major institutions not fully brought under Nazi control.

The Reichskonkordat of July 1933 between Germany and the Holy See pledged to respect Catholic autonomy and required clergy to abstain from political activity. Hitler welcomed the agreement, but the regime repeatedly violated its provisions in its broader struggle with the churches. After Hindenburg's death in August 1934, the Nazis claimed authority over all levels of government, and a referendum confirmed Hitler as Führer. The policy of Gleichschaltung then extended state control over collective and social life, including Catholic schools, youth organizations, workers' associations, and cultural groups.

According to Peter Stachura, most Nazi voters came from the rural and small-town Protestant middle class, while German Catholics predominantly supported the Centre Party and the Bavarian People's Party instead. Voting preferences in Weimar Germany were strongly shaped by social class and religion, and Catholics formed a distinct subculture that was often separated from the largely Protestant mainstream. This was partly as a result of the legacy of Kulturkampf and the Nazi Party's increasingly anti-Catholic identity.

Various senior Nazi officials, including Heinrich Himmler, Alfred Rosenberg, and Martin Bormann, sought to weaken or remove Christian influence in Germany, or to reshape it in line with their own views. The government closed many Catholic institutions that were not strictly religious; Catholic schools had been shut by 1939, and the Catholic press was largely suppressed by 1941. Clergy, members of religious orders, and lay leaders were targeted, and thousands were arrested, often on charges such as currency offences or "immorality".

Germany's leading Catholic prelate, Adolf Cardinal Bertram, issued limited protests and left broader resistance largely to individual Catholics. The hierarchy, which had initially sought a degree of accommodation, was disillusioned by 1937. Pius XI issued the encyclical Mit brennender Sorge, which condemned racism and accused the regime of violating the Reichskonkordat and displaying "fundamental hostility" to the Church; the government responded with renewed repression and anti-Catholic propaganda.

Despite the occupation and harsh treatment of Catholic Poland, some German priests prayed publicly for the German war effort at the outbreak of the conflict. Security chief Reinhard Heydrich further tightened restrictions on Church activities, and the expropriation of monasteries, convents, and other Church properties increased in 1941. In the same year, Bishop Clemens August Graf von Galen's sermons denouncing Nazi euthanasia and defending basic human rights prompted rare popular dissent. The German bishops also condemned state policy towards the Church in pastoral letters, describing it as "unjust oppression".

Eugenio Pacelli, formerly the papal nuncio to Germany, became Pope Pius XII shortly before the outbreak of the Second World War. His legacy remains debated. As Vatican Secretary of State, he supported the Reichskonkordat and sought a diplomatic relationship with the German government. He contributed to the drafting of Mit brennender Sorge, and his first encyclical, Summi Pontificatus, described the invasion of Poland as an "hour of darkness". Although Pius XII affirmed Vatican neutrality, he maintained contacts with members of the German Resistance. Scholarly discussion continues regarding his reluctance to speak publicly and explicitly about Nazi crimes.

During the war, Pius XII used diplomatic channels to assist victims, advocated for peace, shared intelligence with the Allies, and employed Vatican Radio and other media to condemn atrocities. In Mystici corporis Christi (1943), he denounced the killing of disabled people, and the German bishops soon issued a pastoral letter condemning the murder of the "innocent and defenceless", including "people of a foreign race or descent". While Nazi antisemitism was grounded in racial ideology, older Christian-Jewish tensions contributed to broader European antisemitism. Under Pius XII, Catholic institutions rescued many thousands of Jews by issuing false documents, lobbying Axis officials, and sheltering fugitives in monasteries, convents, schools, and other Church properties, including the Vatican and Castel Gandolfo.

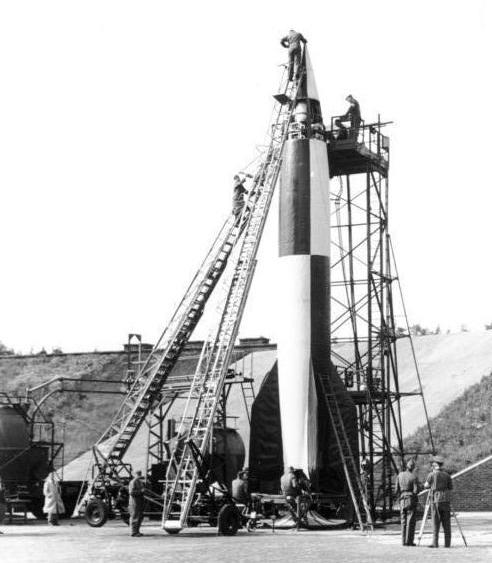
Information from Heinrich Maier's group was used by the Allies for Operation Crossbow against the V-2

In Poland, Slovenia, and Austria, Nazi persecution of the Catholic Church was particularly severe. In Austria, Catholic resistance to National Socialism developed early. Some groups, such as those around the Augustinian priest Roman Karl Scholz, sought to inform the population about the Nazi crimes and to organize active opposition to the regime. The circle around Karl Burian planned an attack on the Gestapo headquarters in Vienna, while the group led by Heinrich Maier passed information on the locations of production sites for V-1 and V-2 rockets, Tiger tanks, and aircraft such as the Messerschmitt Bf 109 and Me 163 to the Allies in an effort to improve the accuracy of bombing raids and shorten the war. Maier's group maintained contact with Allen Dulles, the head of the Office of Strategic Services in Switzerland, from 1942 and reported to him on mass killings at Auschwitz. These Catholic resistance networks were harshly persecuted by the Gestapo, in part because they sought the separation of Austrian territories from the German Reich.

In 1940 the SS designated Dachau concentration camp, which included a separate priests' barracks, as the central internment site for Christian clergy. About 2,720 priests were held there, 95 percent of them Catholic, mostly from Poland, along with 411 from Germany, and 1,031 died in the camp. In Polish territories annexed by Nazi Germany, the authorities sought to suppress the Catholic Church, and more than 1,800 Polish clergy died in concentration camps, including Maximilian Kolbe.

Many imprisoned priests were subjected to harsh treatment, including public humiliations and severe corporal punishment, particularly during religious observances. On Good Friday 1940, for example, a group of priests were suspended from posts for an extended period as punishment. Accounts from Dachau describe priests being "crowned with crowns of barbed wire", while Jewish prisoners were "forced to hail them as kings", as guards "mocked, spat upon, and forced priests to carry railroad ties". These actions were intended as an "imitation of the crucified Lord".

In total, about 706 priests involved in resistance activities were imprisoned by the Nazi authorities, 128 of them in concentration camps, and between 20 to 90 were executed or died while in custody.

In Germany, Catholic responses to Nazism were diverse. Cesare Orsenigo, the papal nuncio in Berin, was cautious in protesting Nazi policies and was viewed as sympathetic to Italian Fascism. German priests, including Alfred Delp, were closely monitored and in many cases denounced, imprisoned, or executed. The German Resistance included Catholic figures and networks, such as members of the Kreisau Circle and participants in the 20 July plot, including Claus von Stauffenberg, Jakob Kaiser, and Bernhard Letterhaus.

Resistance efforts by bishops Johannes de Jong and Jules-Géraud Saliège, papal diplomat Angelo Rotta, and the Hungarian nun Margit Slachta have contrasted with the collaboration of Slovak leader Jozef Tiso and some Croatian nationalist clergy. From the Vatican, Monsignor Hugh O'Flaherty organized the rescue of thousands of Allied prisoners of war and civilians, including Jews. At the same time, Austrian bishop Alois Hudal of the Collegio Teutonico in Rome acted as an informant for Nazi circles, and after the war, he, together with Krunoslav Draganović of the Pontifical Croatian College of St. Jerome, was involved in "ratline" networks that helped fugitive Nazis leave Europe.

=== Church's historical background ===
Although the history of Catholicism in Germany dates back to the missionary work of Columbanus and Saint Boniface in the 6th to 8th centuries, Catholics were a minority by the 20th century. The Reformation, initiated by Martin Luther in 1517, divided German Christians between Protestantism and Catholicism. The populations of southern and western Germany largely remained Catholic, while those in the north and the east became predominantly Protestant.

Otto von Bismarck's Kulturkampf of 1871 to 1878 sought to assert state control and promote a Protestant-oriented nationalism in the new German Empire, combining anticlerical policies with suspicion of Catholics, whose loyalties were sometimes perceived as aligned with Austria and France. The Centre Party, founded in 1870 to represent Christian interests, became, in practice, the principal "political voice of Catholics" during this period. By the late 1870s the Kulturkampf had largely failed and many of its edicts were repealed.

The Catholic Church retained particular strength and certain privileges in regions such as Bavaria, the Rhineland, Westphalia, and parts of the southwest, while Catholics in the predominantly Protestant north sometimes faced social and political discrimination. In the 1930s the Church in Germany comprised six archbishops, nineteen bishops, and about 20,000 priests, at a time when Catholics made up roughly one third of the population. The revolution of 1918–19 and the Weimar Constitution of 1939 refined church-state relations; Germany's churches received state subsidies based on church census data, which made them financially dependent on the state, and therefore vulnerable to government influence.

=== Political Catholicism ===
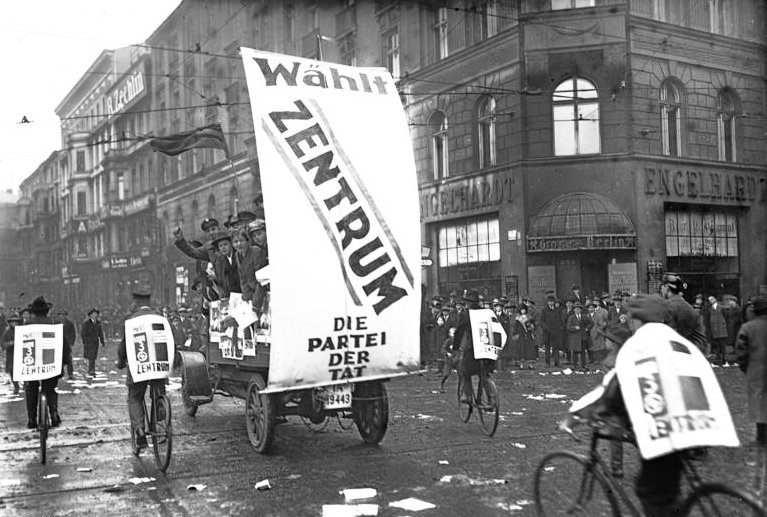
Centre Party supporters before the 1930 federal election

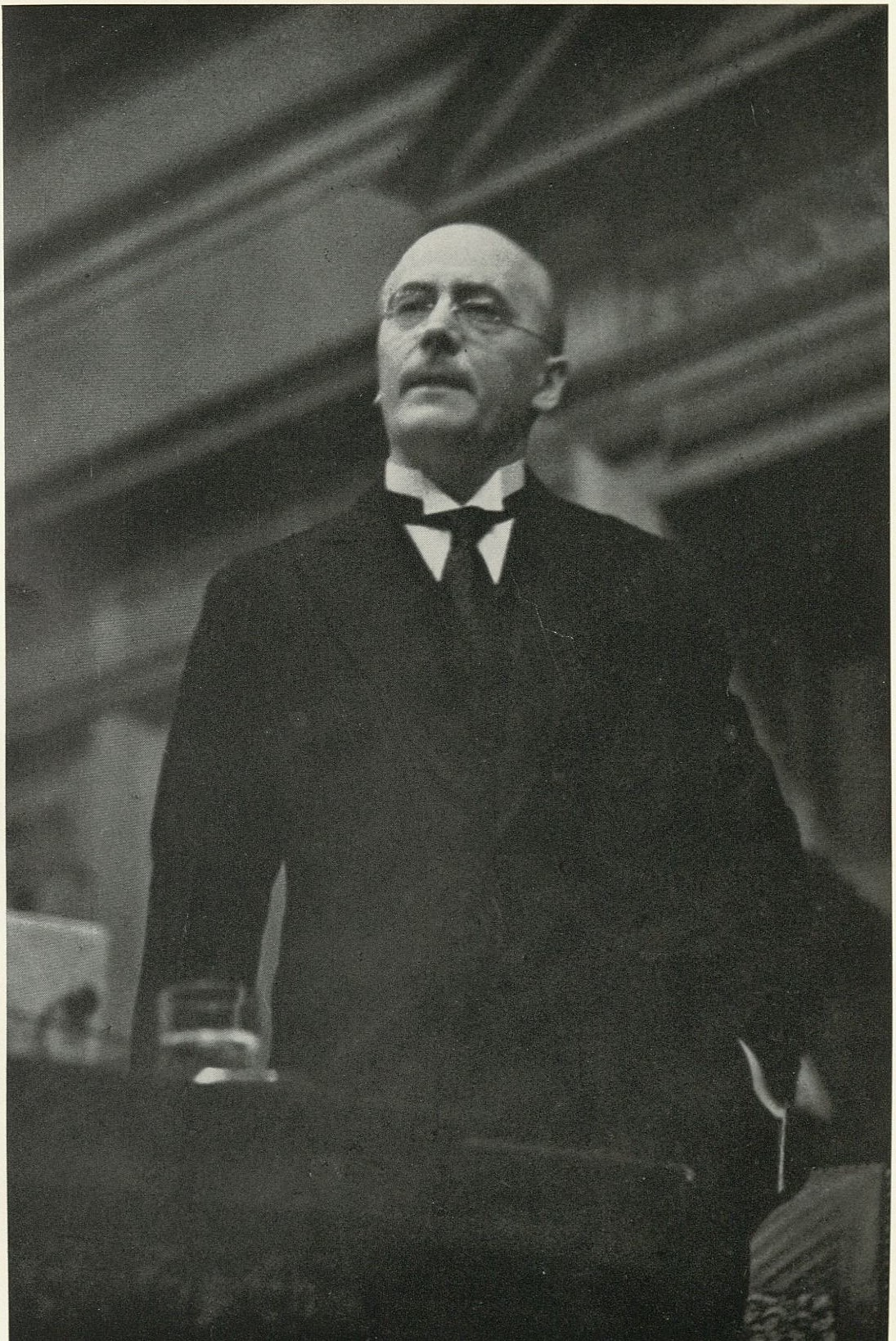
Heinrich Brüning, chancellor from 1930 to 1932

The Centre Party (Zentrum) was a significant social and political force in predominantly Protestant Germany. It helped shape the Weimar Constitution and participated in several coalition governments of the Weimar Republic. The party often cooperated with the Social Democrats and the German Democratic Party, positioning itself at the political centre against extremist movements on both the left and the right. Although it had resisted Bismarck's Kulturkampf, by the summer of 1932 it was described as "a Party whose first concern was to make accommodation with any government in power... to secure the protection of its particular interests". The Centre Party remained relatively moderate during the radicalisation of the early 1930s, but its deputies voted for the Enabling Act of 1933, which granted Hitler sweeping legislative authority.

Catholic leaders criticised Nazi ideology throughout the 1920s and 1930s, and the Catholic Church became one of the main Christian institutions expressing organised opposition to National Socialism. German bishops warned Catholics against Nazi racism before Hitler's rise to power, and several dioceses prohibited membership in the Nazi Party. The Catholic press also condemned National Socialism. As John Cornwell summarised:

Into the early 1930s the German Centre Party, the German Catholic bishops, and the Catholic media had been mainly solid in their rejection of National Socialism. They denied Nazis the sacraments and church burials, and Catholic journalists excoriated National Socialism daily in Germany's 400 Catholic newspapers. The hierarchy instructed priests to combat National Socialism at a local level whenever it attacked Christianity.

Cardinal Michael von Faulhaber, Archbishop of Munich and Freising, opposed Nazi totalitarianism, neopagan elements, and racism, and played a role in undermining the 1923 Beer Hall Putsch. The Cologne Bishops Conference condemned National Socialism in early 1931, followed by similar statements from the bishops of Paderborn and Freiburg. With continued criticism from the Catholic press and the Centre Party, relatively few Catholics voted for the Nazi Party before 1933. As in other German churches, however, some clergy and laypeople supported the new regime.

Five Centre Party politicians served as chancellor of the Weimar Republic: Constantin Fehrenbach, Joseph Wirth, Wilhelm Marx, Heinrich Brüning and Franz von Papen. During the Great Depression, Brüning was appointed chancellor by President Paul von Hindenburg and also served briefly as foreign minister. Although tasked with forming a more conservative cabinet in March 1930, he lacked a parliamentary majority. On 16 July 1930, after failing to secure support for key legislation, Brüning invoked Article 48 of the constitution and dissolved the Reichstag two days later. New elections in September saw major gains for both the Communist and Nazi parties, accelerating the collapse of parliamentary democracy. Brüning supported Hindenburg against Hitler in the 1932 presidential election, but lost Hindenburg's confidence as chancellor and resigned in May of 1932. Vatican Secretary of State Eugenio Pacelli, Centre Party chairman Ludwig Kaas, and many German Catholics were uneasy about Brüning's dependence on Social Democratic votes for political survival, and Brüning later viewed Pacelli's stance as a departure from traditional Catholic political strategy.

==== Anticommunism ====
Karl Marx's opposition to religion pitted Communist movements against the church, which denounced Communism with Pope Leo XIII's May 1891 Rerum novarum encyclical. The church feared Communist conquest (or revolution) in Europe. German Christians were alarmed by the militant Marxist–Leninist atheism which took hold in Russia after its 1917 revolution, a systematic effort to eradicate Christianity. Seminaries were closed, and religious education was criminalized; in 1922, the Bolsheviks arrested Patriarch Tikhon of Moscow.

Communists, initially led by the moderate Kurt Eisner, briefly attained power in Bavaria in 1919. The revolt was then seized by the radical Eugen Leviné, who helped to establish the Bavarian Soviet Republic. This brief, violent experiment in Munich galvanized anti-Marxist and anti-Semitic sentiment among Munich's largely-Catholic population, and the Nazi movement emerged. Hitler and the Nazis gained support as a bulwark against Communism. As apostolic nuncio, Eugenio Pacelli (later Pius XII) was in Munich during the January 1919 Spartacist uprising. Communists burst into his residence in search of his car—an experience which contributed to Pacelli's lifelong distrust of Communism. Many Catholics felt threatened by the possibility of a radical socialism driven, they perceived, by a cabal of Jews and atheists. According to Robert Ventresca, "After witnessing the turmoil in Munich, Pacelli reserved his harshest criticism for Kurt Eisner." Pacelli saw Eisner, an atheistic, radical socialist with ties to Russian nihilists, as embodying the revolution in Bavaria: "What is more, Pacelli told his superiors, Eisner was a Galician Jew. A threat to Bavaria's religious, political, and social life". Anton Braun, in a well-publicized December 1918 sermon, called Eisner a "sleazy Jew" and his administration a "pack of unbelieving Jews". Pius XI opposed European communism in his 1937 encyclical, Divini Redemptoris.

=== Nazi views on Catholicism ===
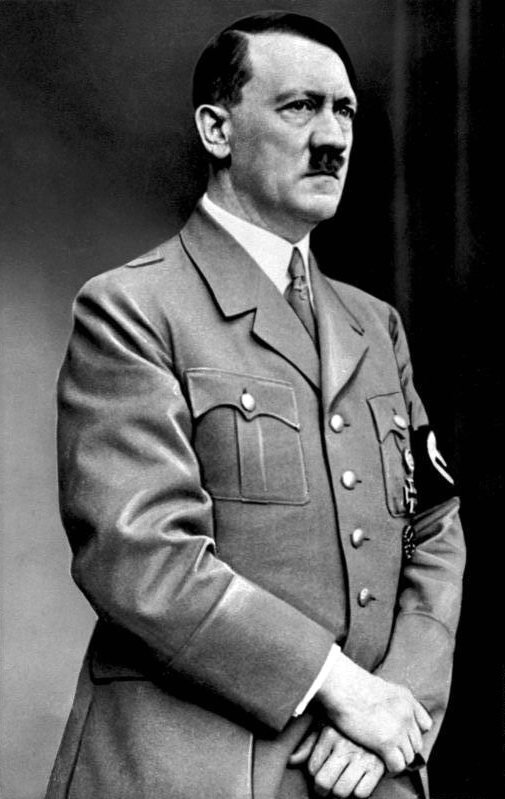
Although Adolf Hitler was raised as a Catholic, he came to despise the religion.

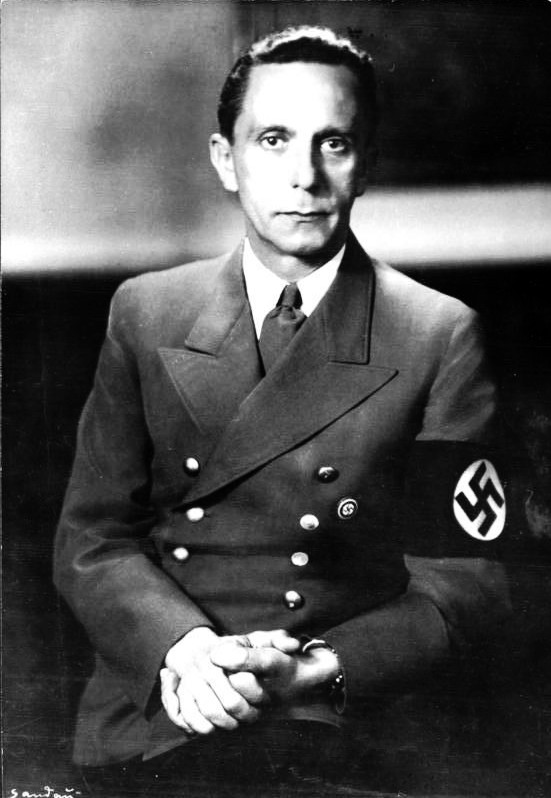
Nazi propaganda minister Joseph Goebbels led the persecution of Catholic clergy in Germany.

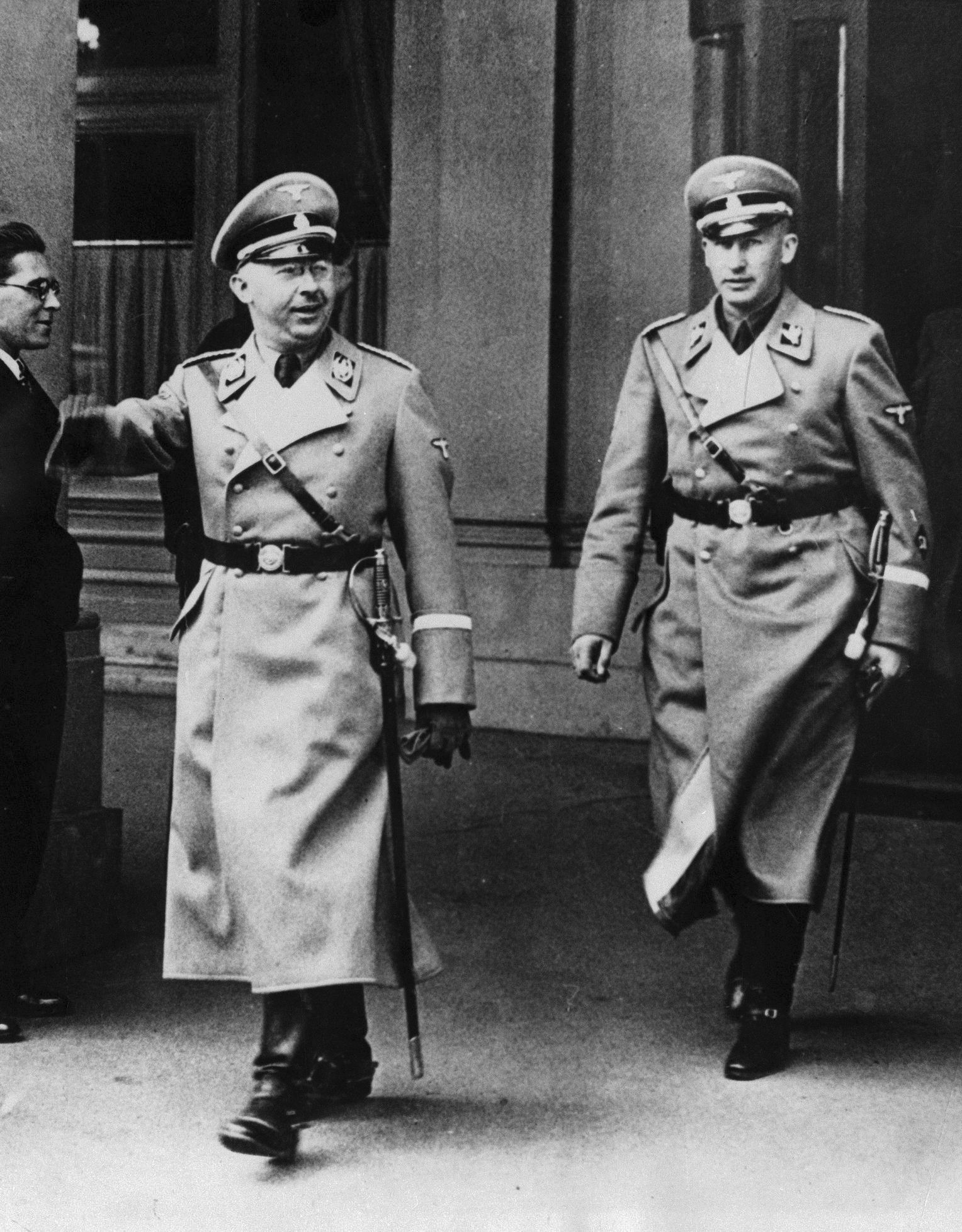
Heinrich Himmler (left) and Reinhard Heydrich, heads of the Nazi security forces, were vehemently anti-Catholic.

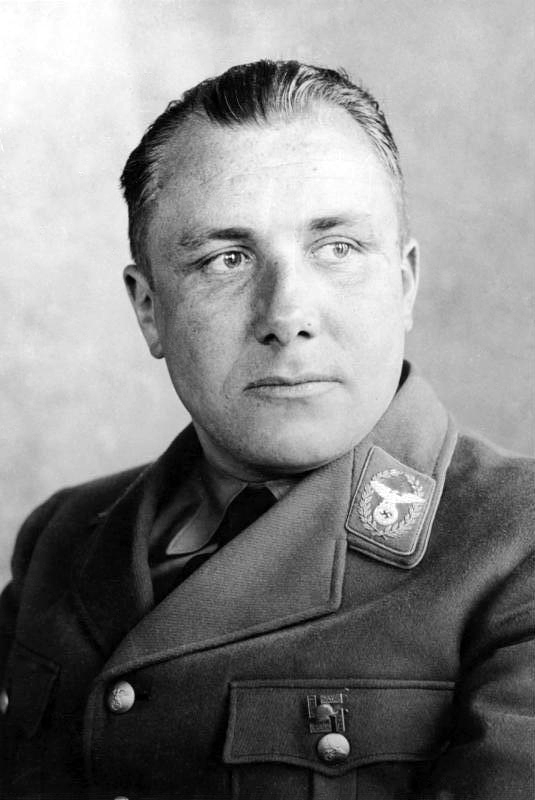
Martin Bormann, Hitler's private secretary, was a leading proponent of anti-clericalism.

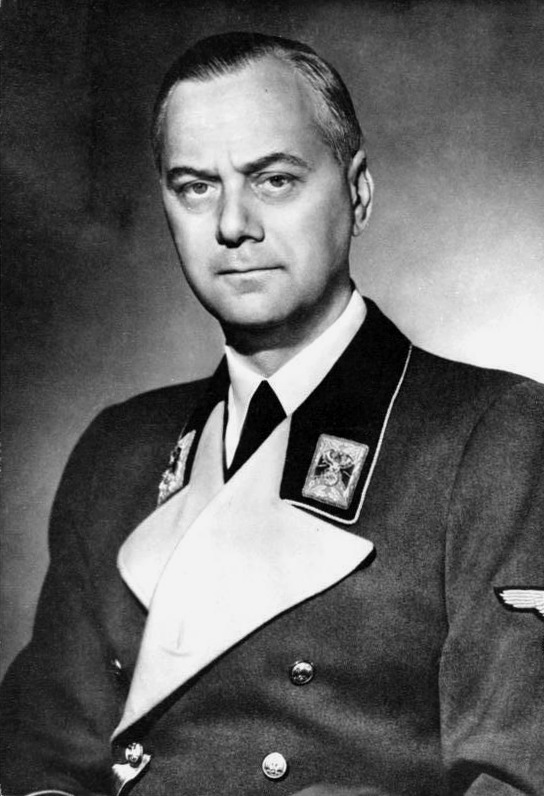
Nazi ideologue Alfred Rosenberg despised Christianity.

Nazism could not accept the existence of an autonomous establishment whose legitimacy did not spring from the government, and it desired the subordination of the church to the state. Although Article 24 of the NSDAP party platform called for conditional toleration of Christian denominations and the Reichskonkordat with the Vatican was signed in 1933 (purportedly guaranteeing religious freedom for Catholics), Hitler considered religion fundamentally incompatible with Nazism. His hostility to the church indicated to his subordinates that continuation of the Kirchenkampf would be encouraged.

Many Nazis suspected that Catholics were disloyal to Germany and they also suspected that Catholics also supported "sinister alien forces". William L. Shirer wrote, "Under the leadership of Rosenberg, Bormann and Himmler—backed by Hitler—the Nazi regime intended to destroy Christianity in Germany, if it could, and substitute the old paganism of the early tribal Germanic gods and the new paganism of the Nazi extremists." Anti-clericalism was strong among grassroots party activists.

==== Hitler ====
Hitler retained some regard for the church's organisational power but he was contemptuous of its central teachings, which "would mean the systematic cultivation of human failure". Aware that Bismarck's 1870s kulturkampf was defeated by the Centre Party, he believed that Nazism could only succeed if political Catholicism and its democratic networks were eliminated. Conservative elements, such as the officer corps, opposed Nazi persecution of the churches.

Although Hitler occasionally said that he wanted to delay the church struggle and he was prepared to restrain his anti-clericalism, his inflammatory remarks to the members of his inner circle encouraged them to continue their battle with the churches. He said that science would destroy the last vestiges of superstition, and Nazism and religion could not co-exist in the long run. Germany could not tolerate foreign influences such as the Vatican, and priests were "black bugs" and "abortions in black cassocks".

In Hitler's eyes, Christianity was a religion fit only for slaves; he detested its ethics in particular. Its teaching, he declared, was a rebellion against the natural law of selection by struggle and the survival of the fittest.

— Hitler: A Study in Tyranny by Alan Bullock

==== Goebbels ====
Minister of Propaganda Joseph Goebbels was among the most aggressive anti-church radicals, and prioritized the conflict with the churches. Born to a Catholic family, he became one of the government's most relentless antisemites. On the "Church Question", he wrote "after the war it has to be generally solved. ... There is, namely, an insoluble opposition between the Christian and a heroic-German world view." Goebbels led the persecution of Catholic clergy.

==== Himmler and Heydrich ====
Heinrich Himmler and Reinhard Heydrich headed the Nazi security forces, and were key architects of the Final Solution. They considered Christian values the enemies of Nazism and "eternally the same", wrote Heydrich: "the Jew, the Freemason, and the politically-oriented cleric." Heydrich considered Christianity and liberal individualism the residue of inherited racial characteristics, biologically sourced to Jews (who must be exterminated). Himmler was vehemently opposed to Christian sexual morality and the "principle of Christian mercy", which he saw as an obstacle to his battle with "subhumans." In 1937, he wrote:

We live in an era of the ultimate conflict with Christianity. It is part of the mission of the SS to give the German people in the next half-century the non-Christian ideological foundations on which to lead and shape their lives. This task does not consist solely in overcoming an ideological opponent but must be accompanied at every step by a positive impetus: in this case, that means the reconstruction of the German heritage in the widest and most comprehensive sense.

— Heinrich Himmler, 1937

Himmler saw the main task of his Schutzstaffel (SS) organisation as "acting as the vanguard in overcoming Christianity and restoring a 'Germanic' way of living" to prepare for the coming conflict between "humans and subhumans"; although the Nazi movement opposed Jews and Communists, "by linking de-Christianisation with re-Germanization, Himmler had provided the SS with a goal and purpose all of its own" and made it a "cult of the Teutons".

==== Bormann ====
Martin Bormann, who became Hitler's private secretary in 1941, was a militant anti-church radical and loathed Christianity's Semitic origins. When the bishop of Munster led the public protest against Nazi euthanasia, Bormann called for him to be hanged. In 1941, he said that "National Socialism and Christianity are irreconcilable."

==== Rosenberg ====
In January 1934, Hitler appointed Alfred Rosenberg the Reich's cultural and educational leader. A neo-pagan, the notoriously anti-Catholic Rosenberg was editor of the Völkischer Beobachter. In 1924, Hitler chose him to oversee the Nazi movement while he was in prison (possibly because he was unsuitable for the task, and unlikely to become a rival). In The Myth of the Twentieth Century (1930), Rosenberg described the Catholic Church as a primary enemy of Nazism. He proposed replacing traditional Christianity with the neo-pagan "myth of the blood":

Church officials were disturbed by Rosenberg's appointment, Hitler's endorsement of Rosenberg's anti-Jewish, anti-Christian, neo-pagan philosophy. The Vatican directed its Holy Office to place The Myth of the Twentieth Century on its Index Librorum Prohibitorum on 7 February 1934. Rosenberg reportedly had little or no influence on government decisions, and was marginalized; Hitler called his book "derivative, pastiche, illogical rubbish".

==== Kerrl ====
After Ludwig Müller's failure to unite Protestants behind the Nazi Party in 1933, Hitler appointed his friend Hanns Kerrl as minister for church affairs in 1935. The relatively-moderate Kerrl confirmed Nazi hostility to Christianity in an address during an intense phase of the Kirchenkampf:

The Party stands on the basis of Positive Christianity, and positive Christianity is National Socialism ... National Socialism is the doing of God's will ... God's will reveals itself in German blood; ... Dr. Zoellner and Count Galen have tried to make clear to me that Christianity consists in faith in Christ as the son of God. That makes me laugh ... No, Christianity is not dependent upon the Apostles' Creed ... True Christianity is represented by the party, and the German people are now called by the party and especially the Fuehrer to a real Christianity; ... the Fuehrer is the herald of a new revelation.

— Hanns Kerrl, 1937

== History ==
=== The Nazis take power ===
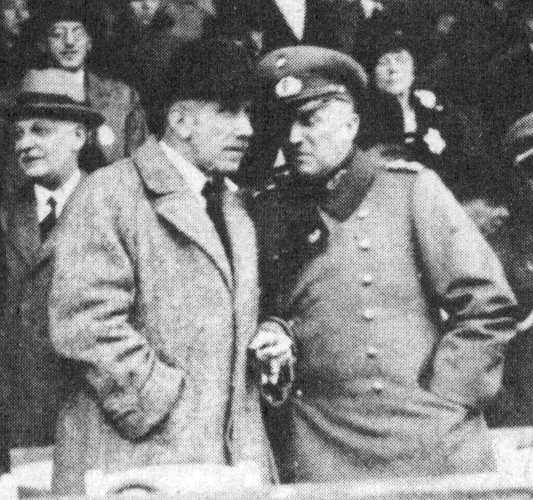
Chancellor Franz von Papen (left) with his eventual successor, Minister of Defence Kurt von Schleicher

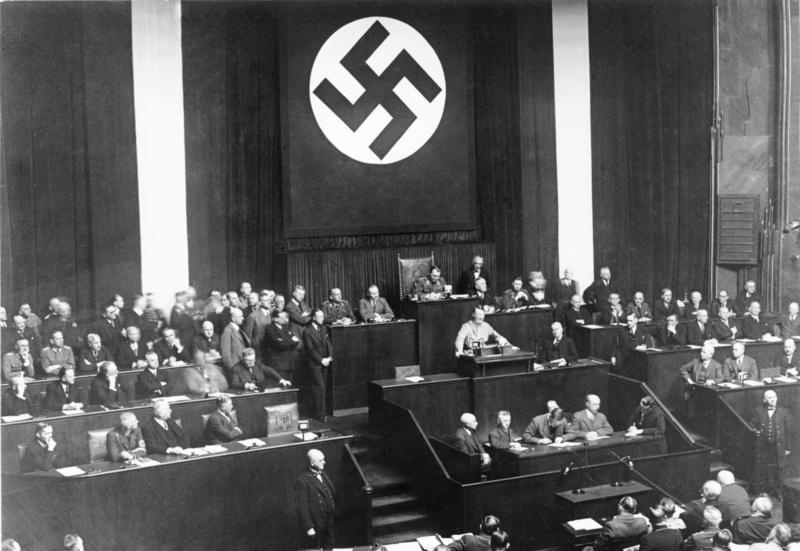
Hitler addressing the Reichstag on 23 March 1933

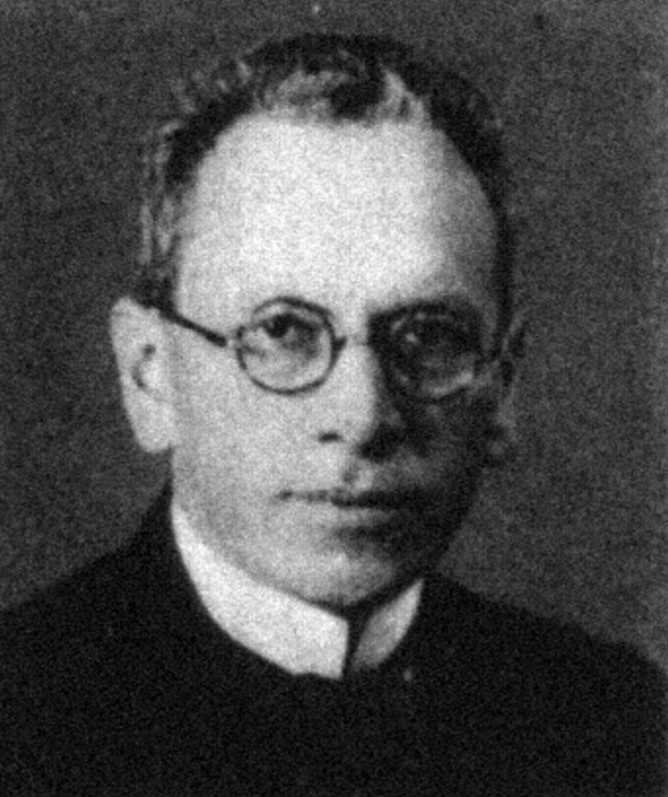
"Clinging to a belief in Hitler's promises", Centre Party leader Ludwig Kaas announced on 23 March 1933 that his party would support Hitler's Enabling Law.

Hitler became involved with the fledgling Nazi Party after World War I. He set the movement's violent tone early, forming the paramilitary Sturmabteilung (SA). Catholic Bavaria resented rule by Protestant Berlin; although Hitler initially saw its revolution as a means to power, an early attempt was fruitless. Imprisoned after the 1923 Munich Beer Hall Putsch, he used the time to produce Mein Kampf; he claimed that an effeminate Jewish-Christian ethic was enfeebling Europe, and Germany needed a man of iron to restore itself and build an empire. Hitler decided to pursue power through "legal" means.

Following the Wall Street crash of 1929, the Nazis and the Communists made substantial gains in the 1930 federal election. The Nazis' largest gains were in the northern Protestant, rural towns; Catholic areas remained loyal to the Centre Party. The Nazis and Communists pledged to eliminate democracy, and they shared over 50 per cent of the Reichstag seats. Germany's political system made it difficult for chancellors to govern with a stable parliamentary majority, and the chancellors relied on emergency presidential powers. From 1931 to 1933, the Nazis combined terror tactics with conventional campaigning; Hitler crisscrossed the nation by air while SA troops paraded in the streets, beat up their opponents and broke up their meetings. There was no middle-class liberal party strong enough to block the Nazis. The Social Democrats were a conservative trade-union party with ineffective leadership; the Centre Party maintained its voting bloc but was preoccupied by defending its own interests, and the Communists engaged in violent street clashes with the Nazis. Moscow had directed the Communist Party to prioritise the destruction of the Social Democrats, seeing them as more dangerous than the German Right who made Hitler their partner in a coalition government.

The coalition developed slowly; the Centre Party's Heinrich Brüning, Chancellor from 1930 to 1932, was unable to reach terms with Hitler and governed with the support of the president and the army rather than parliament. With the backing of Kurt von Schleicher and Hitler's approval, the 84-year-old Paul von Hindenburg (a conservative monarchist) appointed Catholic monarchist Franz von Papen to replace Brüning as chancellor in June 1932. Papen was active in the resurgence of the right-wing Harzburg Front, and had fallen out with the Centre Party. He hoped, ultimately, to outmaneuver Hitler.

After the July 1932 federal elections, the Nazis were the largest party in the Reichstag. Hitler withdrew his support for Papen, and demanded the chancellorship; Hindenburg refused. The Nazis approached the Centre Party to form a coalition, but no agreement was reached. Papen dissolved Parliament, and the Nazi vote declined in the November 1932 federal election. Hindenburg appointed Schleicher as chancellor, and the aggrieved Papen came to an agreement with Hitler. Hindenburg appointed Hitler chancellor on 30 January 1933, in a coalition between the Nazis and the DNVP. Papen was to serve as vice-chancellor in a majority-conservative cabinet, mistakenly believing that he could "tame" Hitler. Papen spoke out against Nazi excesses and narrowly escaped death in the Night of the Long Knives, when he ceased to openly criticize Hitler's government. German Catholics greeted the Nazi takeover with apprehension, since leading clergy had been warning about Nazism for years. A threatening, albeit sporadic at first, persecution of the Catholic Church in Germany began.

=== The Enabling Law ===
The Nazis began to suspend civil liberties and eliminate political opposition after the Reichstag fire, excluding the Communists from the Reichstag. In the March 1933 federal elections, no one party received a majority; Hitler required the Reichstag votes of the Centre Party and the Conservatives. He told the Reichstag on 23 March that Positive Christianity was the "unshakeable foundation of the moral and ethical life of our people", promising not to threaten the churches or state institutions if he was granted plenary powers. With typical negotiation and intimidation, the Nazis called on Ludwig Kaas' Centre Party and the other parties in the Reichstag to vote for the Enabling Act on 24 March 1933. The law would give Hitler the freedom to act without parliamentary consent or constitutional limitations.

Hitler dangled the possibility of friendly co-operation, promising not to threaten the Reichstag, the president, the states, or the churches if granted emergency powers. With the Nazi paramilitary encircling the building, he said: "It is for you, gentlemen of the Reichstag, to decide between war and peace". Hitler offered Kaas an oral guarantee to maintain the Centre Party and autonomy for the church and its educational and cultural institutions. The Centre Party, promised non-interference in religion, joined with the conservatives in supporting the act; only the Social Democrats opposed it. The party, the Bavarian People's Party and other groups "voted for their own emasculation in the paradoxical hope of saving their existence thereby". Hitler immediately began abolishing the powers of the states and dismantled non-Nazi political parties and organisations. The act allowed Hitler and his cabinet to rule by emergency decree for four years, although Hindenburg remained president. It did not infringe on presidential power, and Hitler would not achieve full dictatorial power until Hindenburg's August 1934 death. Until then, Hindenburg remained commander and chief of the military and retained the power to negotiate foreign treaties. On 28 March, the German Bishops' Conference conditionally revised the ban on Nazi Party membership.

During the winter and spring of 1933, Hitler ordered the wholesale dismissal of Catholic civil servants; the leader of the Catholic trade unions was beaten by brownshirts, and a Catholic politician sought protection after SA troopers wounded a number of his followers at a rally. Hitler then called for a reorganization of church-state relations; by June, thousands of Centre Party members were incarcerated in concentration camps. Two thousand Bavarian People's Party functionaries were rounded up by police in late June 1933, and it ceased to exist by early July. Lacking public ecclesiastical support, the Centre Party also dissolved on 5 July. Non-Nazi parties were formally outlawed on 14 July, when the Reichstag abdicated its democratic responsibilities.

=== The Reichskonkordat ===
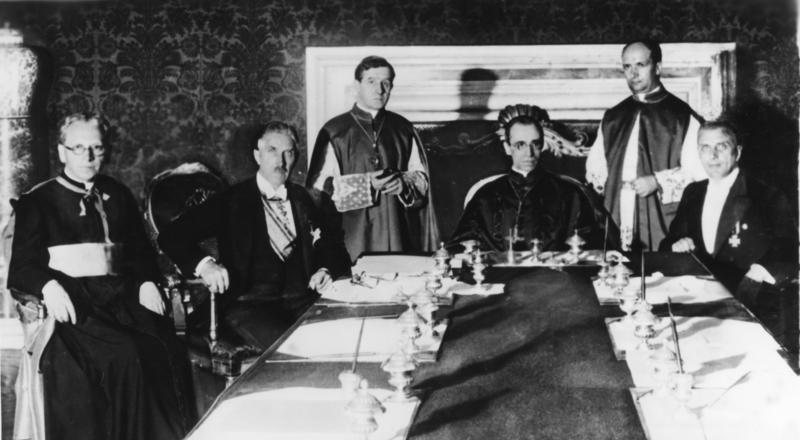
Eugenio Pacelli (seated, centre) at the signing of the Reichskonkordat in Rome (left to right) Ludwig Kaas, Franz von Papen, Giuseppe Pizzardo, Alfredo Ottaviani, and Rudolf Buttmann

The church concluded eighteen concordats, beginning in the 1920s, under Pius XI to safeguard its institutional rights. Peter Hebblethwaite noted that the treaties were unsuccessful: "Europe was entering a period in which such agreements were regarded as mere scraps of paper". The Reichskonkordat was signed on 20 July 1933, and ratified in September of that year; it remains in force. The agreement was an extension of existing concordats with Prussia and Bavaria by nuncio Eugenio Pacelli, including a 1924 state-level concordat with Bavaria. It was "more like a surrender than anything else: it involved the suicide of the Centre Party ...". Signed by Hindenburg and Papen, it realized a church desire since the early Weimar Republic to secure a nationwide concordat. German breaches of the treaty began almost immediately; although the church repeatedly protested, it preserved diplomatic ties with the Nazi government.

From 1930 to 1933, the church had limited success negotiating with successive German governments; a federal treaty, however, was elusive. Centre Party politicians had pushed for a concordat with the Weimar Republic. Pacelli became the Vatican Secretary of State responsible for the church's global foreign policy in February 1930, and continued working toward the "great goal" of a treaty with Germany. The Vatican was anxious to reach an agreement with the new government despite "continuing molestation of Catholic clergy, and other outrages committed by Nazis against the Church and its organisations". When Papen and Ambassador Diego von Bergen met Pacelli in late June 1933, they found him "visibly influenced" by reports of actions against German Catholic interests. Hitler wanted to end all Catholic political life; the church wanted protection of its schools and organisations, recognition of canon law regarding marriage, and the papal right to select bishops. Papen was chosen by the new government to negotiate with the Vatican, and the bishops announced on 6 April that negotiations on a concordat would begin in Rome. Some Catholic critics of the Nazis emigrated, including Waldemar Gurian, Dietrich von Hildebrand, and Hans Ansgar Reinhold. Hitler began enacting laws restricting the movement of funds (making it impossible for German Catholics to send money to missionaries), restricting religious institutions and education, and mandating attendance at Sunday-morning Hitler Youth functions.

Papen went to Rome on 8 April. Outgoing Centre Party chair Ludwig Kaas, who arrived in Rome shortly before him, negotiated a draft with him on behalf of Pacelli. The concordat prolonged Kaas' stay in Rome, leaving his party without a chairman; he resigned his post on 5 May, and the party elected Heinrich Brüning under increasing pressure from the Nazi campaign of Gleichschaltung. The bishops saw a 30 May 1933 draft as they assembled for a joint meeting of the Fulda (led by Breslau's Cardinal Bertram) and Bavarian conferences (led by Munich's Michael von Faulhaber). Wilhelm Berning of Osnabrück and Archbishop Conrad Grober of Freiburg presented the document to the bishops. Weeks of escalating anti-Catholic violence had preceded the conference, and many bishops feared for the safety of the church if Hitler's demands were not met. The strongest critics of the concordat were Cologne's Cardinal Karl Schulte and Eichstätt's Bishop Konrad von Preysing. They noted that the Enabling Act established a quasi-dictatorship, and the church lacked legal recourse if Hitler decided to disregard the concordat. The bishops approved the draft, and delegated Grober to present their concerns to Pacelli and Kaas.

On 14 July 1933, the Nazi government accepted the Reichskonkordat. It was signed six days later by Pacelli for the Vatican and von Papen for Germany; Hindenburg then signed, and it was ratified in September. Article 16 required bishops to take an oath of loyalty to the state; Article 31 acknowledged that although the church would continue to sponsor charitable organisations, it would not support political organisations or causes. Article 32 gave Hitler what he wanted: the exclusion of clergy and members of religious orders from politics. According to Guenter Lewy, however, members of the clergy could theoretically join (or remain) in the Nazi Party without violating church discipline: "An ordinance of the Holy See forbidding priests to be members of a political party was never an issue; ... the movement sustaining the state cannot be equated with the political parties of the parliamentary multi-party state in the sense of Article 32." The government banned new political parties, turning Germany into a one-party state.

The Reichskonkordat signified international acceptance of Hitler's government. Robert Ventresca wrote that it left German Catholics with no "meaningful electoral opposition to the Nazis", and the "benefits and vaunted diplomatic entente [of the Reichskonkordat] with the German state were neither clear nor certain". According to Paul O'Shea, Hitler had a "blatant disregard" for the agreement; its signing was, to him, the first step in the "gradual suppression of the Catholic Church in Germany". Hitler said in 1942 that he saw the Reichskonkordat as obsolete, intended to abolish it after the war, and hesitated to withdraw Germany's representative from the Vatican only for "military reasons connected with the war" Pope Pius XI issued Mit brennender Sorge, his 1937 encyclical, when Nazi treaty violations escalated to physical violence., although he was probably mindful of the fact that just a few years before the war, in 1933, at least 40% of all Germans were Catholics, making it politically unpalatable to start a public and open conflict with the Vatican and which had led to the Reichskonkordat in the first place.

=== Persecution ===
A threatening, but initially sporadic, persecution of the church followed the Nazi takeover. The Nazis claimed jurisdiction over all collective and social activity, interfering with Catholic education, youth groups, workers' clubs and cultural societies. "By the latter part of the decade of the Thirties, church officials were well aware that the ultimate aim of Hitler and other Nazis was the total elimination of Catholicism and of the Christian religion. Since the vast majority of Germans were either Catholic or Protestant this goal was a long-term rather than short-term Nazi objective". Hitler moved quickly to eliminate political Catholicism, and the Nazis arrested thousands of Centre Party members. The Bavarian People's Party government was overthrown by a Nazi coup on 9 March 1933, and the dissolution of the Centre Party in early July left Germany without a Catholic party for the first time; the Reichskonkordat prohibited clergy from participating in politics. Anton Gill wrote that "with his usual irresistible, bullying technique", Hitler proceeded to "take a mile where he had been given an inch" and closed all Catholic institutions whose functions were not strictly religious:

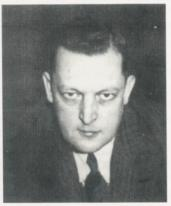
Adalbert Probst, the national director of the Catholic Youth Sports Association, was murdered during the Night of the Long Knives.

It quickly became clear that [Hitler] intended to imprison the Catholics, as it were, in their own churches. They could celebrate mass and retain their rituals as much as they liked, but they could have nothing at all to do with German society otherwise. Catholic schools and newspapers were closed, and a propaganda campaign against the Catholics was launched.

— Anton Gill, An Honourable Defeat p.57

The Nazis promulgated the Law for the Prevention of Hereditarily Diseased Offspring, a sterilization law which was offensive to the church, shortly before the Reichskonkordat was signed. Days later, the dissolution of the Catholic Youth League began. Political Catholics were targets of the 1934 Night of the Long Knives purge: Catholic Action head Erich Klausener, Papen speechwriter and adviser Edgar Jung (also a Catholic Action worker), and Catholic Youth Sports Association national director Adalbert Probst; former Centre Party chancellor Heinrich Brüning narrowly escaped death. William Shirer wrote that the German people were not aroused by Nazi church persecution. Most were not moved to face death or imprisonment for the freedom of worship. Impressed by Hitler's early foreign-policy successes and the restoration of the German economy, few "paused to reflect that the Nazis intended to destroy Christianity in Germany, and substitute old paganism of tribal Germanic gods and the new paganism of the Nazi extremists." Anti-Nazi sentiment grew in Catholic circles as the government increased its repression.

==== Clergy ====
Clergy, members of male and female religious orders and lay leaders began to be targeted. Thousands were arrested, often on trumped-up charges of currency smuggling or "immorality". Priests were watched closely and denounced, arrested and sent to concentration camps. In 1940, a clergy barracks was established at Dachau. Clergy intimidation was widespread; Cardinal Michael von Faulhaber was shot at, Cardinal Theodor Innitzer had his Vienna residence ransacked in October 1938, and Bishop Joannes Baptista Sproll of Rottenburg was assaulted and his home vandalised. Propaganda satirizing the clergy included Anderl Kern's play, The Last Peasant. Under Reinhard Heydrich and Heinrich Himmler, the Sicherheitspolizei and Sicherheitsdienst suppressed internal and external enemies of the state; among them were the "political churches" (such as Lutheranism and Catholicism) who opposed Hitler. Dissidents were arrested and sent to concentration camps. In the 1936 campaign against monasteries and convents, the authorities charged 276 members of religious orders with "homosexuality"; trials of priests, monks, lay brothers and nuns for "immorality" peaked in 1935–36. Protests of the show trials were organised in the United States, including a June 1936 petition signed by 48 clergymen (including rabbis and Protestant pastors). Winston Churchill wrote disapprovingly in the British press of Germany's treatment of "the Jews, Protestants and Catholics of Germany".

Since senior clerics could rely on popular support, the government had to consider the possibility of nationwide protests. Although hundreds of priests and members of monastic orders were sent to concentration camps during the Nazi era, only one bishop, Petrus Legge, was briefly imprisoned; another was expelled from his diocese. In 1940, the Gestapo launched an intense persecution of the monasteries. Dominican Province of Teutonia provincial and German resistance spiritual leader Laurentius Siemer was influential in the Committee for Matters Relating to the Orders, which formed in response to Nazi attacks on Catholic monasteries to encourage the bishops to oppose the regime more effectively. Clemens August Graf von Galen and Konrad von Preysing attempted to protect priests from arrest.

==== The press ====
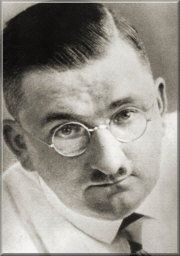
Fritz Gerlich, editor of Munich's Catholic weekly, was murdered during the Night of the Long Knives.

Germany's Catholic press faced censorship and closure. In March 1941, Joseph Goebbels banned the church press due to a "paper shortage". In 1933, the Nazis established a Reich Chamber of Authorship and a Reich Press Chamber under the Reich Cultural Chamber of the Ministry for Propaganda. Dissident writers were terrorized, and the 1934 Night of the Long Knives was the culmination of this early campaign. Fritz Gerlich, editor of Munich's Catholic weekly Der Gerade Weg, was killed for his criticism of the Nazis; writer and theologian Dietrich von Hildebrand was forced to flee Germany. Poet Ernst Wiechert protested government attitudes toward the arts, calling them "spiritual murder"; he was arrested and interned at Dachau. Hundreds of arrests and the closure of Catholic presses followed Mit brennender Sorge, Pius XI's anti-Nazi encyclical. Nikolaus Gross, a Christian trade unionist and journalist, was beatified by Pope John Paul II in 2001. Declared an enemy of the state in 1938, his newspaper was shut down. Gross was arrested as part of the 20 July plot roundup, and was executed on 23 January 1945.

==== Education ====
In 1933, the Nazi school superintendent of Munster issued a decree that religious instruction be combined with discussion of the "demoralising power" of the "people of Israel". Bishop Clemens von Galen of Münster refused, saying that interference in the curriculum violated the Reichskonkordat and children would be confused about their "obligation to act with charity to all men" and the historical mission of the people of Israel. The Nazis removed crucifixes from schools in 1936, and a protest by Galen led to a public demonstration. Hitler pressured parents to remove children from religious classes for ideological instruction; in elite Nazi schools, Christian prayers were replaced with Teutonic rituals and sun worship. Church kindergartens were closed, and Catholic welfare programs were restricted because they assisted the "racially unfit". Parents were coerced into removing their children from Catholic schools. Bavarian teaching positions formerly allotted to nuns were given to secular teachers, and denominational schools became "community schools". In 1937, authorities in Upper Bavaria tried to replace Catholic schools with "common schools"; Cardinal Faulhaber resisted. By 1939, all Catholic schools had been closed or converted to public facilities.

==== Anti-clericalism ====
In late 1935, Bishop Clemens August Graf von Galen of Münster urged a joint pastoral letter protesting an "underground war" against the church. The church hierarchy was disillusioned by early 1937; Pius XI issued his Mit brennender Sorge encyclical in March, accusing the government of violating the Reichskonkordat and sowing the "tares of suspicion, discord, hatred, calumny, of secret and open fundamental hostility to Christ and His Church". The Nazis intensified their persecution the following month. Goebbels noted heightened verbal attacks on the clergy by Hitler in his diary, writing that Hitler had approved trumped-up "immorality trials" of the clergy and an anti-church propaganda campaign. Goebbels' attack included a "morality trial" of 37 Franciscans. His Ministry of Propaganda pressured the churches to voice support for World War II, and the Gestapo banned church meetings for several weeks. During the war's first few months, the churches complied; no denunciations of the invasion of Poland or the Blitzkrieg were issued. The bishops said, "We appeal to the faithful to join in ardent prayer that God's providence may lead this war to blessed success for Fatherland and people." Reinhard Heydrich determined that support from church leaders could not be expected because of the nature of their doctrines and internationalism, however, and wanted to cripple clerical political activities. He devised measures to restrict church operations under cover of war-time exigencies such as reducing resources available to church presses on the basis of rationing and prohibiting pilgrimages and large church gatherings due to transportation difficulties. Churches were closed for being "too far from bomb shelters"; bells were melted down, and presses were closed.

Germany's attack on the churches expanded with the 1941 war on the Eastern Front. Monasteries and convents were targeted, and expropriation of church properties increased. Nazi authorities falsely claimed that the properties were needed for wartime necessities such as hospitals or accommodations for refugees and children. "Hostility to the state" was commonly cited for the confiscations, and the action of a single member of a monastery or convent could result in seizure; the Jesuits, in particular, were targeted. Although papal nuncio Cesare Orsenigo and Cardinal Bertram repeatedly complained, they were told to expect more requisitions due to war-time needs. Over 300 monasteries and other institutions were expropriated by the SS. On 22 March 1942, the German bishops issued a pastoral letter entitled "The Struggle against Christianity and the Church". The letter defended human rights and the rule of law, accusing the Nazis of "unjust oppression and hated struggle against Christianity and the Church" despite Catholic loyalty and military service.

==== Plans ====
In January 1934, Hitler appointed the neo-pagan anti-Catholic Alfred Rosenberg as the Reich's cultural and educational leader. That year, Rome's Congregation for the Doctrine of the Faith in Rome recommended that Rosenberg's book be placed on the Index Librorum Prohibitorum for scorning and rejecting "all dogmas of the Catholic Church, indeed the very fundamentals of the Christian religion". Rosenberg outlined the future of religion envisioned by the Hitler government with a thirty-point program. According to the program, the German Evangelical Church would control all churches; publication of the Bible would cease, and crucifixes, Bibles and statues of saints on altars would be replaced by with Mein Kampf ("to the German nation and therefore to God the most sacred book"). The swastika would replace the cross on churches.

== Spanish Civil War ==
The Spanish Civil War (1936–39) was fought by the Nationalists (aided by Fascist Italy and Nazi Germany) and the Republicans (aided by the Soviet Union, Mexico and volunteer International Brigades under the command of the Comintern). Spain's Republican president, Manuel Azaña, was anticlerical; the Nationalist Generalissimo Francisco Franco established a longstanding Fascist dictatorship which restored some privileges to the church. On 7 June 1942, Hitler said that he believed Franco's accommodation of the church was an error: "One makes a great mistake if one thinks that one can make a collaborator of the Church by accepting a compromise. The whole international outlook and political interest of the Catholic Church in Spain render inevitable conflict between the Church and Franco regime". The Nazis portrayed the war as a contest between civilization and Bolshevism. According to historian Beth Griech-Polelle, many church leaders "implicitly embraced the idea that behind the Republican forces stood a vast Judeo-Bolshevik conspiracy intent on destroying Christian civilization." Joseph Goebbels' Ministry of Propaganda was the main source of German domestic coverage of the war. Goebbels (like Hitler) frequently alleged a link between Jewishness and communism, instructing the press to call the Republican side "Bolsheviks" and not mention German military involvement. In August 1936, the German bishops met for their annual conference in Fulda. They produced a joint pastoral letter about the Spanish Civil War: "Therefore, German unity should not be sacrificed to religious antagonism, quarrels, contempt, and struggles. Rather our national power of resistance must be increased and strengthened so that not only may Europe be freed from Bolshevism by us, but also that the whole civilized world may be indebted to us."

== Faulhaber meets Hitler ==
Goebbels noted Hitler's mood in his 25 October 1936 diary entry: "Trials against the Catholic Church temporarily stopped. Possibly wants peace, at least temporarily. Now a battle with Bolshevism. Wants to speak with Faulhaber". As nuncio, Cesare Orsenigo arranged for Cardinal Faulhaber to meet privately with Hitler on 4 November. After Hitler spoke for an hour, Faulhaber told him that the Nazi government had been waging war on the church for three years; seventeen hundred religious teachers had lost their jobs, 600 in Bavaria alone. The church could not accept the law mandating the sterilization of criminals and disabled people: "When your officials or your laws offend Church dogma or the laws of morality, and in so doing offend our conscience, then we must be able to articulate this as responsible defenders of moral laws". Hitler told Faulhaber that religion was critical to the state, and his goal was to protect the German people from "congenitally afflicted criminals such as now wreak havoc in Spain". Faulhaber replied that the church would "not refuse the state the right to keep these pests away from the national community within the framework of moral law." Hitler argued that the radical Nazis could not be contained until there was peace with the church; either the Nazis and the church would fight Bolshevism together, or there would be war on the church. Kershaw cites the meeting as an example of Hitler's ability to "pull the wool over the eyes even of hardened critics"; "Faulhaber—a man of sharp acumen, who often courageously criticized the Nazi attacks on the Catholic Church, went away convinced Hitler was deeply religious". Faulhaber asked church leaders on 18 November to remind parishioners of the errors of communism outlined in Pope Leo XIII's 1891 encyclical, Rerum novarum. Pius XI announced the following day that communism had moved to the head of the list of "errors", and a clear statement was needed. On 25 November, Faulhaber told the Bavarian bishops that he promised Hitler that the bishops would issue a pastoral letter condemning "Bolshevism, which represents the greatest danger for the peace of Europe and the Christian civilization of our country". He said that the letter "will once again affirm our loyalty and positive attitude, demanded by the Fourth Commandment, toward today's form of government and the Führer". Hitler's promise to Faulhaber to clear up "small" problems between church and state was not kept. Faulhaber, Galen, and Pius XI continued to oppose Communism as anxiety reached a high point with what the Vatican called a "red triangle" formed by the USSR, Republican Spain and revolutionary Mexico.

== Euthanasia ==
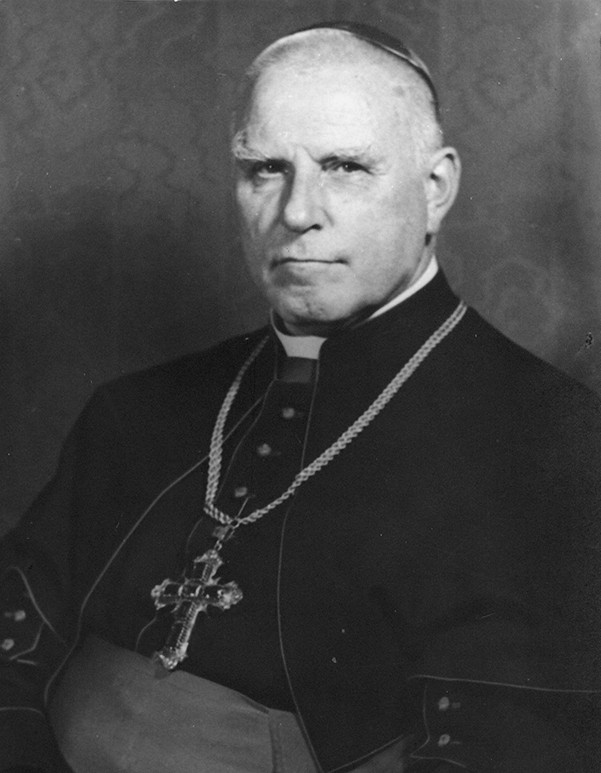
Bishop von Galen of Münster, a conservative nationalist and anti-Communist who became a critic of some Nazi policies

In 1939, Germany began a programme of euthanasia in which those deemed "racially unfit" would be "euthanised". The senile, people who were mentally disabled or mentally ill, those with epilepsy, disabled people, children with Down syndrome and people with similar conditions qualified. The programme systematically murdered over 70,000 people. As awareness of the euthanasia programme spread, church leaders who opposed it (primarily Catholic Bishop of Münster Clemens August Graf von Galen and Protestant Bishop of Wurttemberg Theophil Wurm) roused widespread public opposition. Protests were issued by Pope Pius XII, and Bishop von Galen's 1941 intervention led to "the strongest, most explicit and most widespread protest movement against any policy since the beginning of the Third Reich."

The pope and the German bishops had previously protested against the eugenics-inspired Nazi sterilization of the "racially unfit". Catholic protests against the escalation of this policy into "euthanasia" began in the summer of 1940. Despite Nazi efforts to transfer hospitals to state control, large numbers of disabled people were still under church care. After Protestant welfare activists took a stand at the Bethel Hospital in von Galen's diocese, Galen wrote to Bertram in July 1940 urging the church to take a moral position. Bertram urged caution. Archbishop Conrad Gröber of Freiburg wrote to the head of the Reich Chancellery and offered to pay all costs incurred by the state for the "care of people intended for death". The Fulda Bishops Conference sent a protest letter to the Reich Chancellery on 11 August, and sent Bishop Heinrich Wienken of Caritas Internationalis to discuss the matter. Wienken cited the Fifth Commandment, warning officials to halt the program or face public church protest. Although Wienken then wavered, fearing that he might jeopardise his efforts to have Catholic priests released from Dachau, he was urged to stand firm by Cardinal Michael von Faulhaber. The government refused to halt the program in writing, and the Vatican declared on 2 December that the policy was contrary to natural and divine law: "The direct killing of an innocent person because of mental or physical defects is not allowed".

Arrests of priests and seizure of Jesuit properties by the Gestapo in his home city of Munster convinced Galen that the caution advised by his superior was pointless. He spoke on 6, 13 and 20 July 1941 against the seizure of properties and expulsions of nuns, monks and religious, and criticized the euthanasia programme. The police raided his sister's convent, and detained her in the cellar; she escaped, and Galen made his boldest challenge to the government in a 3 August sermon. He formally accused those responsible for the murders in a letter to the public prosecutor. The policy opened the way to the murder of all "unproductive people", including invalid war veterans; "Who can trust his doctor anymore?". Galen said that it was a Christian duty to oppose the taking of human life, even if it risked one's own. He addressed a moral danger to Germany from the government's violations of human rights. "The sensation created by the sermons was enormous", and they were a "vigorous denunciation of Nazi inhumanity and barbarism". Gill wrote: "Galen used his condemnation of this appalling policy to draw wider conclusions about the nature of the Nazi state". The sermons were distributed illegally, and Galen had them read in churches. The British broadcast excerpts on the BBC German service, dropped leaflets over Germany, and distributed the sermons in occupied countries.

Bishop Antonius Hilfrich of Limburg wrote to the justice minister denouncing the murders, and Bishop Albert Stohr of Mainz condemned the taking of life from the pulpit. Some of the priests who distributed the sermons were arrested and sent to concentration camps. Bishop von Preysing's cathedral administrator, Bernhard Lichtenberg, protested by letter to Leonardo Conti, Reich Health Leader. Lichtenberg was arrested, and died en route to Dachau. Galen's public protest came after he had been given proof of the killings; advising passive resistance only, he was not interrogated or arrested. The sermons angered Hitler, who said in 1942: "The fact that I remain silent in public over Church affairs is not in the least misunderstood by the sly foxes of the Catholic Church, and I am quite sure that a man like Bishop von Galen knows full well that after the war I shall extract retribution to the last farthing". Although he wanted to remove Galen, Goebbels told him that it would cost him Westphalian loyalty. Martin Bormann wanted Galen hanged, but Hitler and Goebbels urged a delay in retribution until the war ended. With the programme public knowledge, nurses and staff (particularly in Catholic institutions) tried to obstruct its implementation. Hitler halted the main euthanasia program on 24 August 1941, although less-systematic murder of disabled people continued. Techniques learnt in the euthanasia programme were later used in the Holocaust. Pius XII issued his Mystici corporis Christi encyclical in 1943, condemning the murder of disabled people. The encyclical was followed on 26 September by an open condemnation by the German bishops of the killing of "innocent and defenseless mentally handicapped, incurably infirm and fatally wounded, innocent hostages, and disarmed prisoners of war and criminal offenders, people of a foreign race or descent".

== Opposition ==
Although the 1933 Reichskoncordat prohibited the clergy from political participation (weakening opposition by Catholic leaders), the clergy were among the first major components of the German Resistance. "From the very beginning, some churchmen expressed, quite directly at times, their reservations about the new order. In fact, those reservations gradually came to form a coherent, systematic critique of many of the teachings of National Socialism." The most incisive public criticism of the Nazis later came from some German religious leaders. The government was reluctant to move against them, since they could claim to be tending to the spiritual welfare of their flocks.

Neither Catholicism nor Protestantism was willing to openly oppose the Nazi state. Offering "something less than fundamental resistance to Nazism", the churches "engaged in a bitter war of attrition with the regime, receiving the demonstrative backing of millions of churchgoers. Applause for Church leaders whenever they appeared in public, swollen attendances at events such as Corpus Christi Day processions, and packed church services were outward signs of the struggle ... especially of the Catholic Church—against Nazi oppression". The churches were the earliest, most-enduring centres of systematic opposition to Nazi policies. Christian morality and Nazi anti-clericalism motivated many German resistors for the "moral revolt" to overthrow Hitler.

According to Robert A. Krieg, "Catholic bishops, priests, and lay leaders had criticized National Socialism since its inception in the early 1920s", while The Sewanee Review remarked in 1934 that even "when the Hitler movement was still small and apparently insignificant, German Catholic ecclesiastics recognized its inherent threat to certain beliefs and principles of their Church". Catholic sermons and newspapers vigorously denounced Nazism and accused it of espousing neopaganism, and Catholic priests forbade believers from joining the NSDAP. Waldemar Gurian noted that the upper Catholic bishops issued several condemnations of the NSDAP starting in 1930 and 1931, and describing the relations between the National Socialism and the Catholic Church, concluded that "though there has been no legal declaration of war, a war is nevertheless going on." Ludwig Maria Hugo was the first Catholic bishop to condemn membership in the Nazi party, and in 1931 Cardinal Michael von Faulhaber wrote that "[t]he bishops as guardians of the true teachings of faith and morals must issue a warning about National Socialism, so long as and insofar as it maintains cultural-political views that are not reconcilable with Catholic doctrine." Cardinal Faulhaber's outspoken criticism of National Socialism gained widespread attention and support from German Catholic churches, and Cardinal Adolf Bertram called German Catholics to oppose National Socialism in its entirety because it "stands in the most pointed contradiction to the fundamental truths of Christianity". According to the Sewanee Review, "Catholics were expressly forbidden to become registered members of the National Socialist party; disobedient Catholics were refused admission to the sacraments; groups in Nazi uniform and with Nazi banners were not admitted to church services". The condemnations of Nazism by Bertram and von Faulhaber reflected the views of most German Catholics, but many of them were also disillusioned with the institutions of the Weimar Republic.

Nazi anti-Semitism embraced pseudoscientific racial principles, but ancient antipathies between Christianity and Judaism also contributed to European antisemitism. Anti-Semitism was present in both German Protestantism and Catholicism, but "anti-Semitic acts and attitudes became relatively more frequent in Protestant areas relative to Catholic areas". Even so, in every country under German occupation, priests played a major role in rescuing Jews. Members of the Church rescued thousands of Jews by issuing false documents to them, lobbying Axis officials, and hiding Jews in monasteries, convents, schools, the Vatican and the papal residence at Castel Gandolfo. Although Pius XII's role during this period was later contested, the Reich Security Main Office called him a "mouthpiece" for the Jews and in his first encyclical (Summi Pontificatus), he called the invasion of Poland an "hour of darkness". In his 1942 Christmas address, he denounced race murders, and in his 1943 encyclical Mystici corporis Christi, he denounced the murder of disabled people.

=== Early political resistance ===
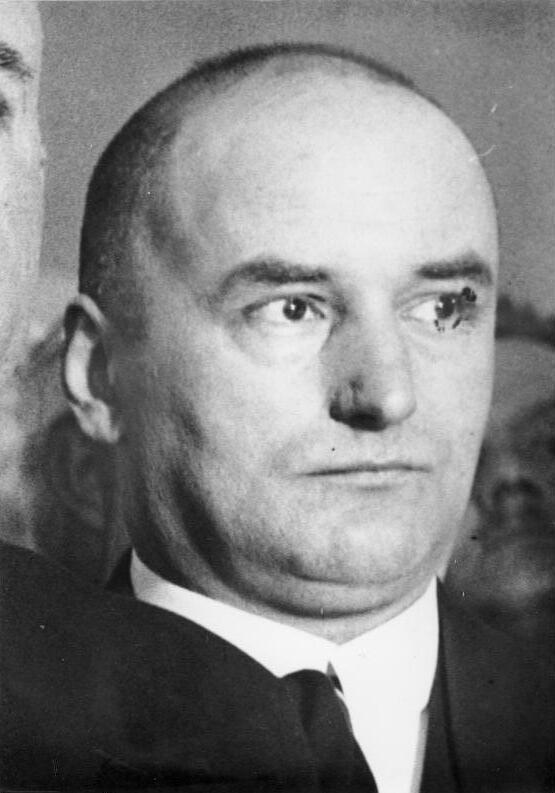
Erich Klausener, the head of Catholic Action, was assassinated during the 1934 Night of the Long Knives.

Political Catholicism was a target of Hitler's government, and opposition politicians began planning to overthrow him; however, non-Nazi parties were banned. Former Centre Party leader and Reich Chancellor Heinrich Brüning and military chiefs Kurt von Schleicher and Kurt von Hammerstein-Equord tried to oust Hitler. Erich Klausener, president of Berlin's Catholic Action group, organised conventions in Berlin in 1933 and 1934. At the 1934 rally, he spoke against political oppression to a crowd of 60,000 after Mass six nights before Hitler implemented a bloody purge. Conservative Catholic nobleman Franz von Papen, who had helped Hitler to power and was Deputy Reich Chancellor, delivered an indictment of the Nazi government in his Marburg speech of 17 June 1934. Papen speechwriter and advisor Edgar Jung, a Catholic Action worker, reasserted the state's Christian foundation. Jung pleaded for religious freedom in a speech he hoped would spur an uprising centred on Hindenburg, Papen and the army.

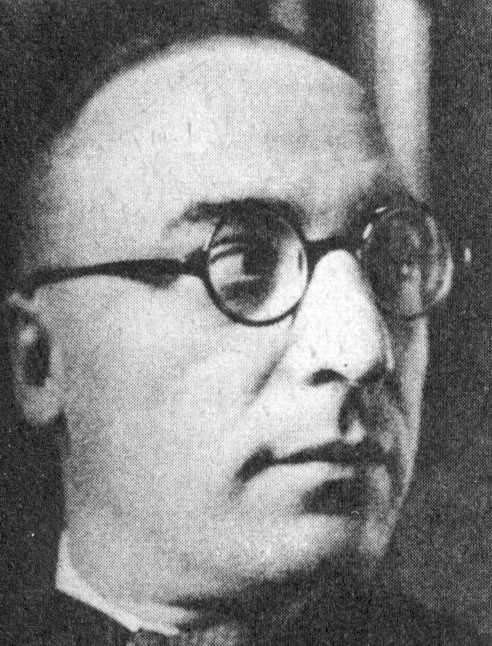
Edgar Jung, who drafted the 17 June 1934 Marburg speech rejecting Nazi totalitarianism, was murdered a few days later in the Night of the Long Knives.

Hitler decided to kill his chief political opponents in what became known as the Night of the Long Knives. It lasted for two days, from 30 June to 1 July 1934. Over 100 opposition figures were killed in addition to Hitler's rivals, including Klausener, Jung and Catholic Youth Sports Association national director Adalbert Probst. The Catholic press was also targeted, and anti-Nazi journalist Fritz Gerlich was murdered. On 2 August 1934, President Hindenburg died. The offices of President and Chancellor were combined; Hitler ordered the army to swear an oath to him, and declared his "revolution" complete.

=== Clerical resistance ===
German resistance historian Joachim Fest wrote that although the church had been hostile to Nazism and "its bishops energetically denounced the 'false doctrines' of the Nazis", its opposition weakened considerably after the Reichskoncordat; Cardinal Bertram "developed an ineffectual protest system", addressing other bishops' demands without annoying the authorities. Firmer resistance by Catholic leaders gradually reasserted itself in the actions of Joseph Frings, Konrad von Preysing, Clemens August Graf von Galen, Conrad Gröber and Michael von Faulhaber. According to Fest, the government responded with "occasional arrests, the withdrawal of teaching privileges, and the seizure of church publishing houses and printing facilities. ... Resistance remained largely a matter of individual conscience. In general they [both churches] attempted merely to assert their own rights and only rarely issued pastoral letters or declarations indicating any fundamental objection to Nazi ideology." Nevertheless, the churches more than any other institution "provided a forum in which individuals could distance themselves from the regime".

The Nazis never felt strong enough to arrest (or execute) senior German Catholic officials, and the bishops could criticise aspects of Nazi totalitarianism. Less-senior officials were more expendable. An estimated one-third of German priests faced government reprisal, and 400 were interned in the priest barracks at Dachau; among the best-known were Alfred Delp and Bernhard Lichtenberg. Max Josef Metzger, the founder of the German Catholics' Peace Association, was arrested in June 1943 after he was denounced by a Gestapo agent for attempting to send a memorandum on the reorganisation of the German state and its integration into a future system of world peace to the Archbishop of Uppsala. Metzger was executed on 17 April 1944. The provincial of the Dominican Province of Teutonia, Laurentius Siemer, and the Bavarian provincial of the Jesuits, Augustin Rösch, were high-ranking members of orders who became active in the resistance; both narrowly survived the war after their knowledge of the 20 July plot was discovered. Rupert Mayer was beatified in 1987. Hundreds of priests and members of religious orders and congregations were sent to concentration camps, but only one German Catholic bishop was briefly interned and another expelled from his diocese. This reflected the church hierarchy's caution. Albert Speer wrote that when Hitler was read passages from a defiant sermon or pastoral letter he became furious, and the fact that he "could not immediately retaliate raised him to a white heat".

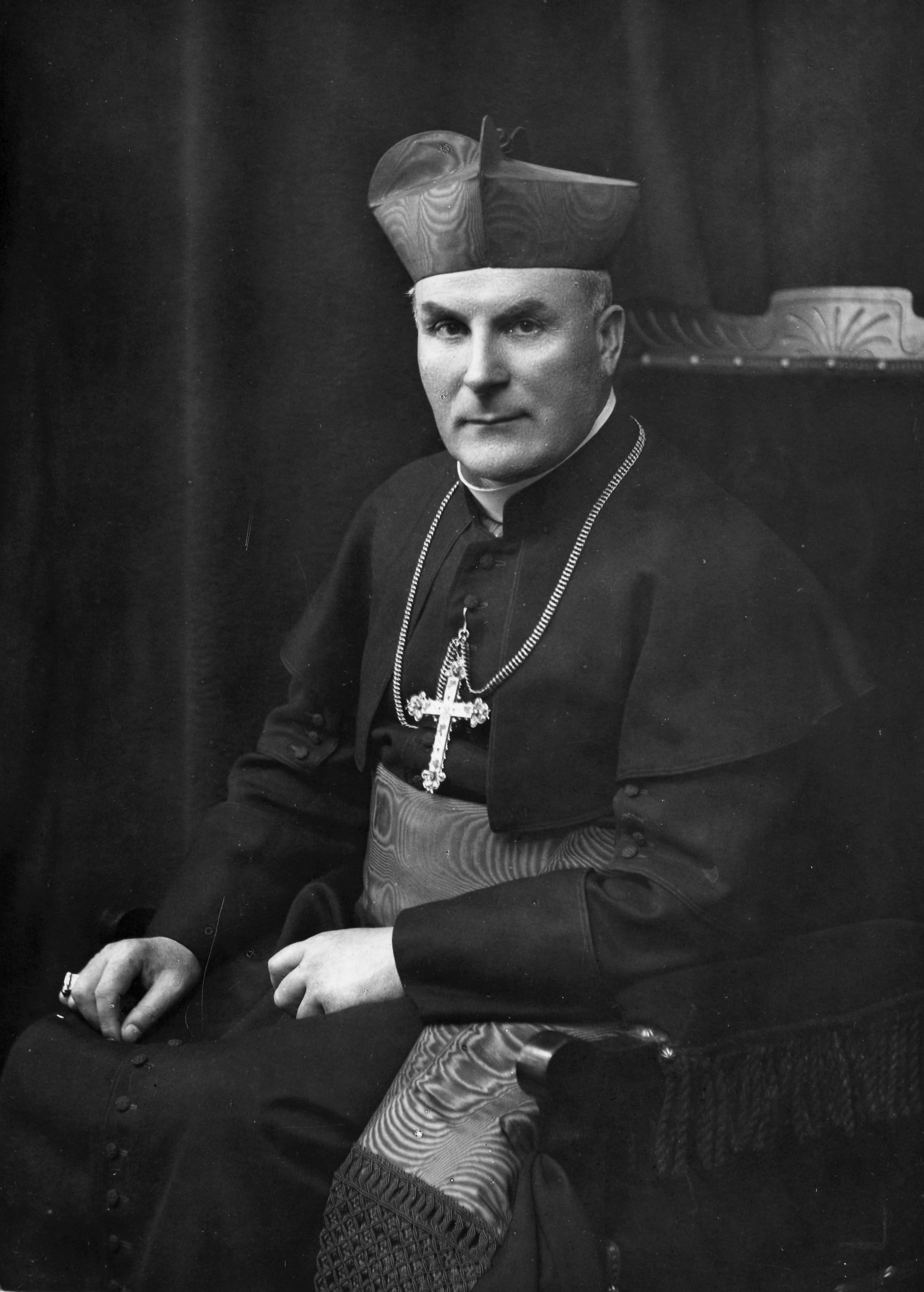
Cardinal Faulhaber (c. 1936)

Cardinal Michael von Faulhaber was an early critic of Nazism; his three 1933 Advent sermons affirmed the Jewish origins of Jesus and the Bible. Cautiously framed as a discussion of historical Judaism, they denounced Nazi extremists who were calling for the Bible to be purged of the "Jewish" Old Testament. Although Faulhaber avoided conflict with the state about secular issues, he "refused to compromise or retreat" in his defense of Catholics. Hitler and Faulhaber met on 4 November 1936. Faulhaber told Hitler that the Nazi government had waged war on the church for three years. The church respected authority, but "when your officials or your laws offend Church dogma or the laws of morality, and in so doing offend our conscience, then we must be able to articulate this as responsible defenders of moral laws". Attempts on his life were made in 1934 and 1938. Konrad von Preysing, appointed bishop of Berlin in 1935, was loathed by Hitler. Preysing opposed Bertram's appeasement of the Nazis, and worked with resistance leaders Carl Friedrich Goerdeler and Helmuth James von Moltke. A member of the commission which prepared Mit brennender Sorge, he tried to block the closure of Catholic schools and arrest of church officials. In 1938, Preysing co-founded the Hilfswerk beim Bischöflichen Ordinariat Berlin (Berlin Diocese Welfare Office). He cared for Jews, and protested the Nazi euthanasia programme. Preysing's 1942–43 Advent pastoral letters on the nature of human rights reflected the Confessing Church's Barmen Declaration, and one was read by the BBC's German service. He blessed Claus von Stauffenberg before the 20 July plot, discussing whether the need for radical change justified tyrannicide.

Münster bishop Clemens August Graf von Galen was Preysing's cousin. A conservative nationalist, he began criticising Nazi racial policy in a January 1934 sermon. Galen equated unquestioning loyalty to the Reich with "slavery", and opposed Hitler's theory of German purity. With Presying, he helped draft the 1937 papal encyclical. Galen denounced Gestapo lawlessness, the confiscation of church properties and Nazi euthanasia in 1941. He protested against the mistreatment of Catholics in Germany, addressing the moral danger of the government's violations of human rights: "The right to life, to inviolability, and to freedom is an indispensable part of any moral social order". A government which punishes without court proceedings "undermines its own authority and respect for its sovereignty within the conscience of its citizens". Evidence suggests the Nazis intended to hang Galen at the end of the war. A critic of Weimar Germany, he initially hoped that the Nazi government might restore German prestige but quickly became disillusioned; he subscribed to the stab-in-the-back myth about Germany's 1918 defeat. Although some clergy refused to feign support for Hitler's government, the Catholic hierarchy adopted a strategy of "seeming acceptance of the Third Reich" by couching their criticisms as motivated by a desire to "point out mistakes that some of its overzealous followers committed". Josef Frings became archbishop of Cologne in 1942, and his consecration was used as a demonstration of Catholic self-assertion. In his sermons, he repeatedly supported persecuted peoples and opposed state repression; Frings attacked arbitrary arrests, racial persecution and forced divorces in March 1944. That autumn, he protested to the Gestapo against the deportation of Jews from the Cologne area. In 1943, the German bishops debated directly confronting Hitler collectively over what they knew of the murder of Jews. Frings wrote a pastoral letter instructing his diocese not to violate the inherent rights of others "not of our blood", even during war, and preached that "no one may take the property or life of an innocent person just because he is a member of a foreign race".

=== Mit brennender Sorge ===
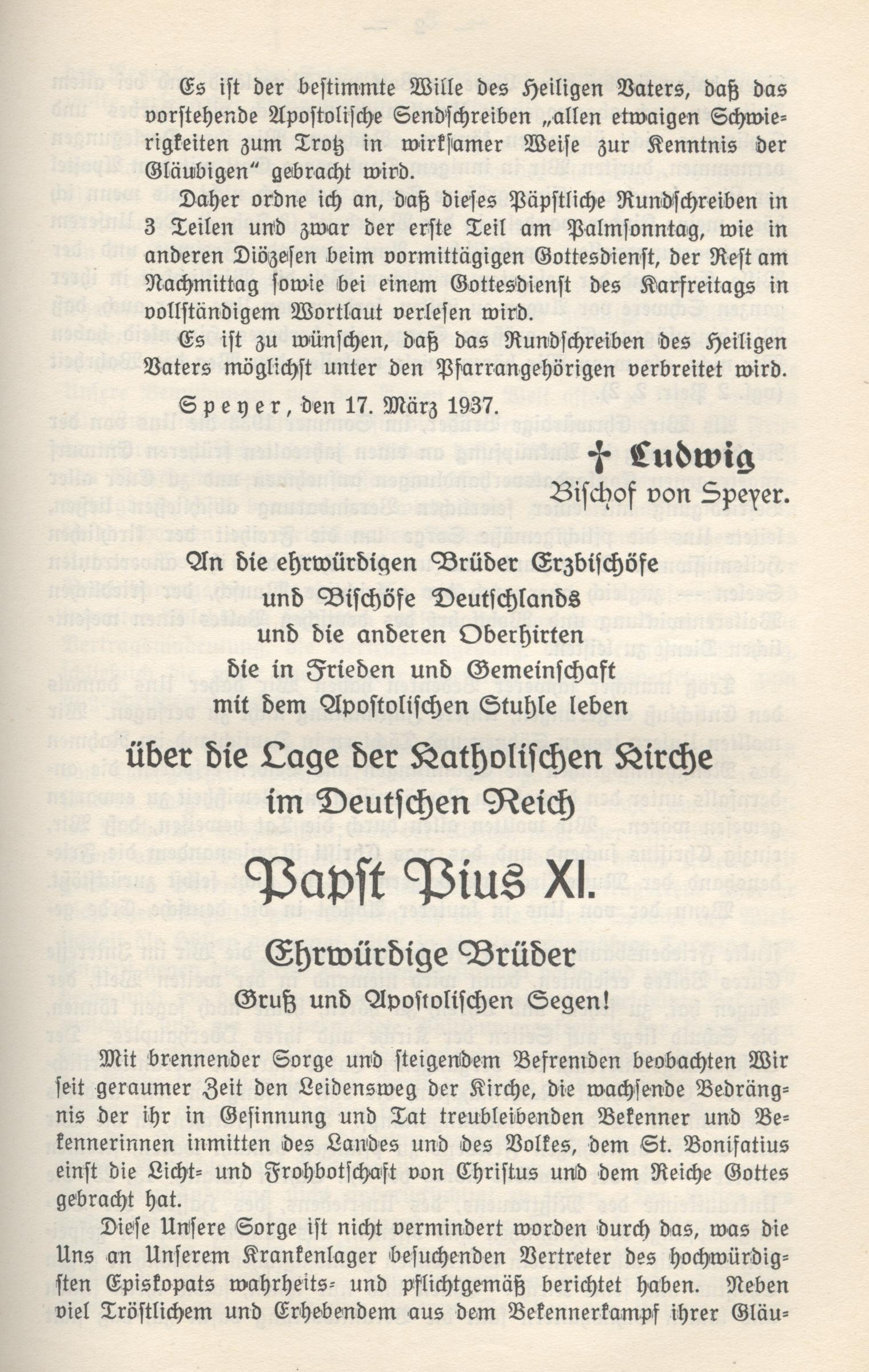
Mit brennender Sorge issued by Pope Pius XI was the first encyclical letter written in German.

By early 1937, the church hierarchy was disillusioned. In March, Pius XI issued the encyclical Mit brennender Sorge ("With burning concern"). Smuggled into Germany to avoid censorship, it was read from the pulpits of all Catholic churches on Palm Sunday. The encyclical condemned Nazi ideology, accusing the government of violating the Reichskoncordat and promoting "suspicion, discord, hatred, calumny, of secret and open fundamental hostility to Christ and His Church". It has been recognised as the "first ... official public document to criticize Nazism" and "one of the greatest such condemnations ever issued by the Vatican." Despite Gestapo efforts to block its distribution, the church distributed thousands of copies to German parishes. Hundreds of people were arrested for giving out copies and Goebbels increased anti-Catholic propaganda, including a show trial of 170 Franciscans in Koblenz. The "infuriated" Nazis increased their persecution of Catholics and the church; according to Gerald Fogarty, "In the end, the encyclical had little positive effect, and if anything only exacerbated the crisis."

The Nazis saw Mit brennender Sorge as "a call to battle against the Reich"; Hitler, furious, "vowed revenge against the Church". Thomas Bokenkotter writes, "The Nazis were infuriated. In retaliation they closed and sealed all the presses that printed it. They took numerous vindictive measures against the Church, including staging a long series of immorality trials of the Catholic clergy." The German police confiscated as many copies as they could, and the Gestapo seized twelve printing presses. According to Owen Chadwick and John Vidmar, Nazi reprisals against the church included "staged prosecutions of monks for homosexuality, with the maximum of publicity". William L. Shirer writes, "During the next years, thousands of Catholic priests, nuns and lay leaders were arrested, many of them on trumped-up charges of 'immorality' or 'smuggling foreign currency'".

=== Priests at Dachau ===
The Nazi security services monitored Catholic clergy closely. They placed agents in every diocese to obtain the bishops' reports to the Vatican and their activities. A "vast network" was established to monitor clergy activities: "The importance of this enemy is such that inspectors of security police and of the security service will make this group of people and the questions discussed by them their special concern". Priests were watched, denounced, arrested and sent to concentration camps for being "suspected of activities hostile to the State" or if there was reason to "suppose that [their] dealings might harm society". Dachau, the first concentration camp, was established in March 1933. A political camp, it contained a dedicated barracks for clergy. Of a total of 2,720 clergy interned at Dachau, 2,579 (or 94.88 per cent) were Catholic. Over 1,000 clergy were recorded as dying in the camp, with 132 "transferred or liquidated". A 1966 investigation found a total of 2,771 clergy, with 692 deceased and 336 sent out on "invalid trainloads" (and presumed dead). The vast majority (1,748) came from Poland, of whom 868 died in the camp. Germans were the next-largest group: 411 Catholic priests, of whom 94 died in the camp; 100 were "transferred or liquidated". France accounted for 153 Catholic clerics, of whom 10 died at the camp. Other Catholic priests were from Czechoslovakia, the Netherlands, Yugoslavia, Belgium, Italy, Luxembourg, Lithuania, Hungary and Romania; two British, one Spanish and one "stateless" priest were also incarcerated at Dachau.

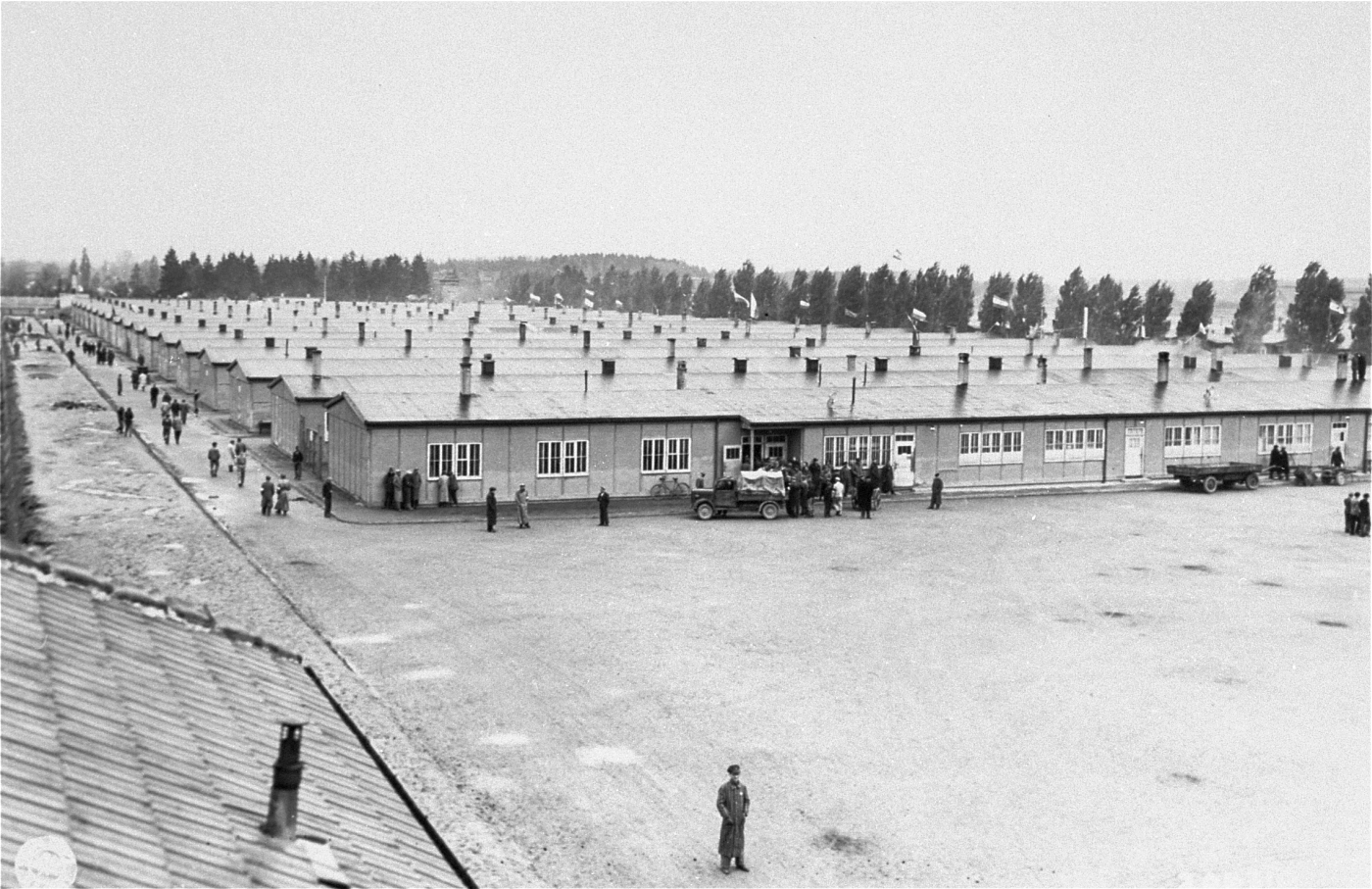
Barracks at Dachau, where the Nazis established a barracks in 1940 for over 400 German priests

Wilhelm Braun, a Catholic theologian from Munich, was the first churchman interned at Dachau in December 1935. The 1938 Anschluss produced an influx of Austrian clerical inmates: "The commandant at the time, Loritz, persecuted them with ferocious hatred, and unfortunately he found some prisoners to help the guards in their sinister work". Despite SS hostility, the Vatican and German bishops lobbied the government to concentrate the clergy at one camp and obtained permission to build a chapel. In December 1940, priests were temporarily gathered in Blocks 26, 28 and 30; Block 26 became the international block, and Block 28 was reserved for Poles. Conditions varied for inmates. The Nazis introduced a racial hierarchy, keeping Poles in harsh conditions and favouring German priests. Many Polish priests died of hypothermia, and a large number were used for medical experimentation. Twenty were infected with phlegmons in November 1942, and 120 were used for malaria experiments between July 1942 and May 1944. Several died on the "invalid trains" sent from the camp; others were liquidated in the camp and given bogus death certificates. Some died of punishments for misdemeanor, were beaten to death or worked to exhaustion. Although religious activity outside the chapel was forbidden, priests would secretly hear confession and distribute the Eucharist to other prisoners.

Otto Neururer, an Austrian parish priest, was sent to Dachau for "slander to the detriment of German marriage" after he advised a girl not to marry the friend of a senior Nazi. Neururer, executed at Buchenwald in 1940 for conducting a baptism there, was the first priest killed in the concentration camps. Bernhard Lichtenberg died en route to Dachau in 1943. Karl Leisner, a deacon from Munster who was dying of tuberculosis, was secretly ordained at Dachau in December 1944 by bishop of Clermont-Ferrand (and fellow prisoner) Gabriel Piguet; Leisner died soon after the liberation of the camp. Among other Catholic clerics sent to Dachau were Father Jean Bernard of Luxembourg; the Dutch Carmelite Titus Brandsma (d. 1942), Stefan Wincenty Frelichowski (d. 1945), Hilary Paweł Januszewski (d. 1945), Lawrence Wnuk, Ignacy Jeż and Adam Kozłowiecki of Poland, and Josef Lenzel and August Froehlich of Germany.

Clergy barracks at Dachau, by nationality
Nationality	Total	Catholic	Released	Transferred	Liberated 29 April 1945	Dead
Poland	1,780	1,748	78	4	830	868
Germany	447	411	208	100	45	94
France	156	153	5	4	137	10
Czechoslovakia	109	93	1	10	74	24
Netherlands	63	39	10	0	36	17
Yugoslavia	50	35	2	6	38	4
Belgium	46	46	1	3	33	9
Italy	28	28	0	1	26	1
Luxembourg	16	16	2	0	8	6
Total	2,720	2,579	314	132	1,240	1,034

=== The resistance ===
Resistance to Hitler consisted of small opposition groups and individuals who plotted or attempted to overthrow him. They were motivated by the mistreatment of Jews, harassment of the churches, and the harsh actions of Himmler and the Gestapo. Christian morality and Nazi anti-clericalism drove many German resistors, but neither the Catholic nor Protestant churches were prepared to openly oppose the state. However, the 20 July plot was "inconceivable without the spiritual support of church resistance". For many Catholics in the resistance (including Jesuit Provincial of Bavaria Augustin Rösch, trade unionists Jakob Kaiser and Bernhard Letterhaus, and 20 July plot leader Claus von Stauffenberg), "religious motives and the determination to resist would seem to have developed hand in hand". During the winter of 1939–40, with Poland overrun and France and Low Countries yet to be attacked, early German military resistance sought papal assistance in preparations for a coup; Colonel Hans Oster of the Abwehr sent attorney Josef Müller on a clandestine trip to Rome. The Vatican considered Müller a representative of Colonel-General Ludwig Beck, and agreed to offer the machinery for mediation. Pius XII, communicating with Britain's Francis d'Arcy Osborne, channelled communications secretly. Hitler's swift victories over France and the Low Countries reduced the German military will to resist, and Müller was arrested and spent the rest of the war in concentration camps, ending up at Dachau. Pius retained his contacts with the German resistance, and continued to lobby for peace.

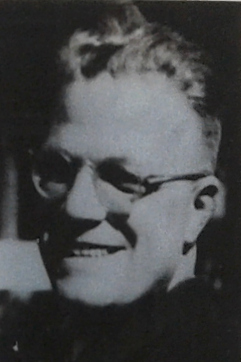
Jesuit Alfred Delp, an influential member of the Kreisau Circle and a leading intellectual of the resistance, was executed in February 1945.

Old-guard conservatives allied with Carl Friedrich Goerdeler broke with Hitler during the mid-1930s. Ian Kershaw wrote that they "despised the barbarism of the Nazi regime. But, were keen to re-establish Germany's status as a major power". Authoritarian, they favoured monarchy and limited electoral rights "resting on Christian family values". Dominican Province of Teutonia provincial Laurentius Siemer spoke to resistance groups about Catholic social teaching as the starting point for the reconstruction of Germany, and worked with Carl Goerdeler and others to plan for a post-coup Germany. After the failure of the 20 July 1944 plot to assassinate Hitler, Siemer evaded capture by the Gestapo at his Oldenberg monastery and hid out until the end of the war as one of the few conspirators to survive the purge. A younger group was called the Kreisau Circle by the Gestapo. The group had a strongly Christian orientation, and sought a general Christian revival and a reawakening of awareness of the transcendental. Its outlook was rooted in German romanticism, German idealism and natural law, and the circle had about twenty core members (including the Jesuits Augustin Rösch, Alfred Delp and Lothar König). Bishop von Preysing also had contact with the group. According to Gill, "Delp's role was to sound out for Moltke the possibilities in the Catholic Community of support for a new, post-war Germany". Rösch and Delp also explored the possibility of common ground between Christian and socialist trade unions. Lothar König was an important intermediary between the circle and bishops Conrad Gröber of Freiberg and Presying of Berlin. The Kreisau Circle combined conservative notions of reform with socialist strains of thought, Delp's "personal socialism". The group rejected Western models, but wanted to include the churches. In Die dritte Idee (The Third Idea), Delp explored a third way between communism and capitalism. The circle pressed for a coup against Hitler, but were unarmed and depended on persuading military figures to take action.

Christian worker activist and Centre Party politician Otto Müller argued for firm opposition by the German bishops to Nazi legal violations. In contact with the German military opposition before the outbreak of war, he allowed opposition figures the use of the Ketteler-Haus in Cologne for their discussions and was involved with 20 July plotters Jakob Kaiser, Nikolaus Gross and Bernhard Letterhaus in planning a post-Nazi Germany. Müller was arrested by the Gestapo after the plot failed and was imprisoned in the Berlin Police Hospital, where he died.

Smaller groups were influenced by Christian morality. The White Rose student-resistance group and the Lübeck martyrs were partially inspired by Galen's anti-euthanasia homilies. The White Rose began publishing leaflets to influence people to oppose Nazism and militarism in 1942, criticising the "anti-Christian" and "anti-social" nature of the war. Their leaders were arrested and executed the following year. Parish priests such as the Lübeck martyrs (Johannes Prassek, Eduard Müller and Hermann Lange) and Lutheran pastor Karl Friedrich Stellbrink also participated in local resistance. Sharing disapproval of the Nazis, the four priests spoke publicly against the Nazis and first discreetly distributed pamphlets to friends and congregants with information from British radio and Galen's sermons. They were arrested in 1942 and executed. The Solf Circle included another Jesuit, Friedrich Erxleben, and sought humanitarian ways of countering the Nazis. The group was arrested in 1944, and some members were executed.

The Catholic Austrian resistance group around the priest Heinrich Maier was formed in 1940 and then very successfully passed on plans and production facilities for V-1, V-2 rockets, Tiger tanks, Messerschmitt Bf 109, Messerschmitt Me 163 Komet and other aircraft to the Allies. This enabled them to target German production facilities. Maier advocated the following principle: "Every bomb that falls on armaments factories shortens the war and spares the civilian population." These contributions by the resistance group were also crucial for the Operation Crossbow and Operation Hydra, both missions for Operation Overlord. The very well networked group around Maier planned a revival of Austria after the war, distributed anti-Nazi leaflets and was in contact with the American secret service. In contrast to many other German resistance groups, the Maier group provided information very early on about the mass murder of Jews through their contacts with the Semperit factory near Auschwitz. In its political plans for the future shape of Austria, the group was non-partisan and had contacts with all parties of the pre-war period. The resistance group then came into the focus of the Abwehr and Gestapo through a double agent, was discovered and most of its members were executed.

A Catholic resistance group called Berlin Circle was formed after the events of Kristallnacht. The circle was formed around Margarete Sommer and bishop Konrad von Preysing, and it attempted to influence the entire Catholic church to react and protest Nazi atrocities. Through its contacts with Nazi bureaucrats and other resistance groups, the Berlin Catholics were also able to obtain accurate information on the Holocaust. Margarete Sommer was inspired to organise a resistance circle by Bernhard Lichtenberg, who would conclude every Catholic Mass with prayers for German Jews and led a new office called Special Relief of the Diocese of Berlin (Hilfswerk beim Ordinariat Berlin), which was a covert operation to rescue German Jews from Nazi persecution. In Winter of 1940, Gertrud Luckner visited Lichtenberg in hopes to create a nationwide Catholic rescue effort, who then directed her to Sommer. The two women soon became associated, and took the lead in the effort for rescuing Jews and calling the Church for intervention. Following Lichtenberg's arrest in October 1941, bishop Preysing took over the Office and appointed Sommer as the executive director. While in most of Germany Jews were considered "something of an abstraction" because of becoming assimilated or constituting only a tiny portion of the local population, Berlin was different – there were 190,000 Jews in the city in 1936, with 40,000 being converts to Catholicism. During her work, Sommer became sensitive to Nazi atrocities and described partaking in Catholic resistance as both challenging and depressing, writing in her diary that "The difficulty of this work lies in the fact that those affected [by National Socialist antisemitism] are psychologically deeply depressed because of the hopelessness of the efforts [to help them]". Once the Nazi persecution started, Jewish converts to Catholicism turned to St. Raphael Society for aid, an organisation that had been assisting Catholic emigration ever since 1871. While prior to 1938 the organisation only had to help those who wanted to emigrate over sluggish economy, it now had to deal with Jewish converts who needed to flee before the state persecution. Because Nazi Germany inherited the Weimar system of organised relief, "each religious group was responsible for its own, and taxes were distributed accordingly". Sommer was unhappy with that, and once the persecution escalated, the Berlin Circle started helping Jews regardless of their confessional choice.

Once Jews were forced to wear the Star of David in public, Sommer wrote to the dean of the German Catholic episcopacy, cardinal Adolf Bertram. She warned that actions such as separate services for Jewish converts would be "an additional psychological burden for them at a time when they were already being tormented", and urged the church to intervene in favour of the Jews. Once the Nazis threatened to dissolve all Jewish-Gentile marriages by decree, Sommer called the German bishops to ask Pope Pius XII himself to intervene. A protest from Cardinal Bertram, as well as local protests from Catholic churches, successfully forestalled the divorce decree. Beginning in 1942, Sommer started to receive detailed information about the situation in Jewish ghettos, which she described as "30 to 80 people inhabiting one room; no heating; no plumbing, and four small slices of bread for a day's rations". From reports she received, Sommer also found out that the families of "transported" Jews were notified of their deaths within two weeks after the departure – this led Sommer to conclude that the "transportation" really meant death. This prompted the Berlin Circle to start hiding Jews rather than trying to assist their flight. Due to Gestapo surveillance, the process was highly secret, and not even Sommer "knew how many Jews were being hidden by Special Relief personnel or by parish support groups working with them, because, as she says in her postwar memoir, it was a secret". Despite Sommer constantly pressuring the German clergy towards acting, what really lacked was intervention from the Vatican itself; historian Michael Phayer concludes that "the bishops would have risked a breach with their government had either the Pope or his nuncio in Berlin, Cesare Orsenigo, pushed or led them in this direction."

=== 20 July plot ===
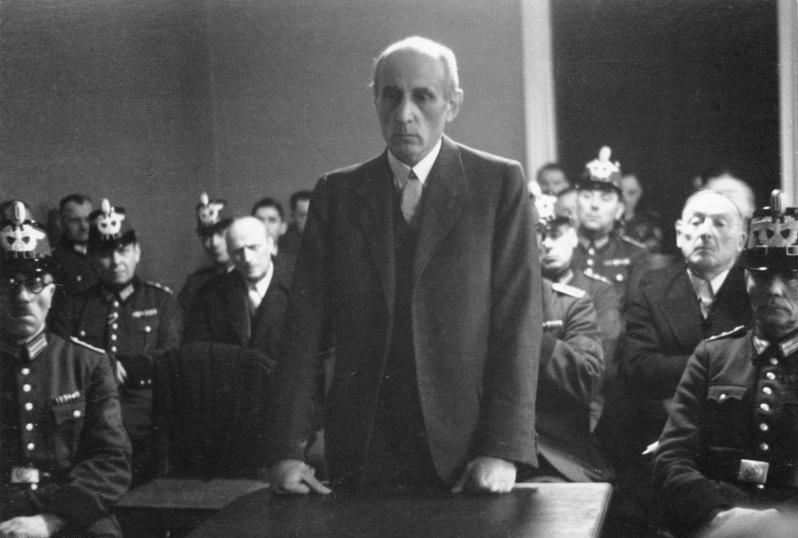
Catholic politician Eugen Bolz at the People's Court. Minister-President of Württemberg in 1933, he was overthrown by the Nazis; arrested for his role in the 20 July plot, he was executed in January 1945.

On 20 July 1944, an attempt was made to assassinate Adolf Hitler in his Wolf's Lair field headquarters in East Prussia. The plot was the culmination of the efforts of several groups in the German resistance to overthrow the Nazi government. During interrogations or their show trials, a number of the conspirators cited the Nazi assault on the churches as a motivation for their involvement. Protestant clergyman Eugen Gerstenmaier said that the keys to the resistance were Hitler's evil and the "Christian duty" to combat it. The leader of the plot, Catholic nobleman Claus von Stauffenberg, initially favoured the Nazis but later opposed their persecution of the Jews and oppression of the church. Stauffenberg led the 20 July plot (Operation Valkyrie) to assassinate Hitler. He joined the resistance in 1943 and began planning the unsuccessful Valkyrie assassination and coup, in which he placed a time bomb under Hitler's conference table. Killing Hitler would absolve the German military of the moral conundrum of breaking their oath to the Fuehrer. Faced with the moral and theological question of tyrannicide, Stauffenberg conferred with Bishop Konrad von Preysing and found affirmation in early Catholicism and Martin Luther. The planned cabinet which would replace the Nazi government included Catholic politicians Eugen Bolz, Bernhard Letterhaus, Andreas Hermes and Josef Wirmer. Wirmer was a leftist member of the Centre Party, had worked to forge ties between the civilian resistance and the trade unions, and was a confidant of Jakob Kaiser (a leader of the Christian trade-union movement, which Hitler banned after taking office). Lettehaus was also a trade-union leader. As a captain in the Oberkommando der Wehrmacht (Supreme Command), he gathered information and become a leading member of the resistance. The "Declaration of Government" which would be broadcast after the coup appealed unambiguously to Christian sensibilities. After the plot failed, Stauffenberg was shot, the Kreisau circle dissolved, and Moltke, Yorck, Delp and others were executed.

The church in the Rhineland secretly agreed in August 1944 to have leaders stay when the Allied invasion of Germany began. Johannes Joseph van der Velden, Bishop of Aachen, thus did not leave when the Nazi government attempted to order the remaining residents to evacuate during the Battle of Aachen.

== Accommodation to Nazism ==
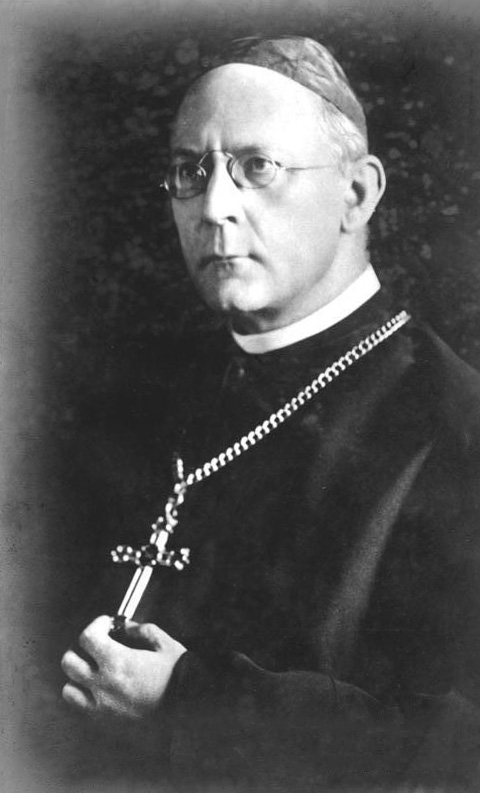
Cardinal Adolf Bertram, ex officio head of the German church from 1920 to 1945, who generally favoured a non-confrontational policy towards the Nazi government

According to Ian Kershaw, "detestation of Nazism was overwhelming within the Catholic Church" but it did not preclude church leaders' approval of government policy—particularly where Nazism "blended into 'mainstream' national aspirations" such as support for "patriotic" foreign policy or war aims; obedience to state authority (where this did not contravene divine law), and the destruction of Marxism and Soviet Bolshevism. Traditional Christian beliefs were "no bulwark" against Nazi biological antisemitism; "the churches as institutions fell on uncertain grounds", and opposition was generally left to fragmented individual efforts. The Catholic hierarchy tried to cooperate with the Nazi government, but became disillusioned by 1937 (when Mit brennender Sorge was issued). Few ordinary Germans, Shirer writes, paused to reflect on the Nazi intention to destroy Christianity in Germany.

According to Harry Schnitker, Kevin Spicer's Hitler's Priests found that about 0.5 per cent of German priests (138 of 42,000, including Austrian priests) could be considered Nazis. One of them was the academic theologian Karl Eschweiler, an opponent of the Weimar Republic, who was suspended from his priestly duties for writing Nazi pamphlets in support of eugenics by Eugenio Pacelli.

Those clergymen became known as "brown priests". Other notable examples include historian Joseph Lortz, a Nazi party member until 1938; military bishop Franz Justus Rarkowski; and Austrian bishop Alois Hudal, who assisted in the establishment of the "ratlines" for escaping Nazis after the war.

Although Conrad Gröber said that bishops should remain loyal to the "beloved folk and Fatherland" in 1943, despite Nazi violations of the Reichskonkordat, he soon came to support resistance to the Nazis and he also protested against the religious persecution of German Catholics. Gröber supported German resistance worker Gertrud Luckner's Office for Religious War Relief (Kirchliche Kriegshilfsstelle) under the auspices of the Caritas aid agencies. The office became the instrument through which Freiburg Catholics helped racially persecuted "non-Aryans" (Jews and Christians). Luckner used funds from the archbishop to help Jews. After the war, Gröber said that the Nazis had planned to crucify him. According to Mary Fulbrook, Catholics were prepared to resist when politics encroached on the church; otherwise, their record was uneven: "It seems that, for many Germans, adherence to the Christian faith proved compatible with at least passive acquiescence in, if not active support for, the Nazi dictatorship". When Galen delivered his 1941 denunciations of Nazi euthanasia and Gestapo lawlessness, he also said that the church had never sought to overthrow the government.

== Papacy ==
=== Pius XI ===
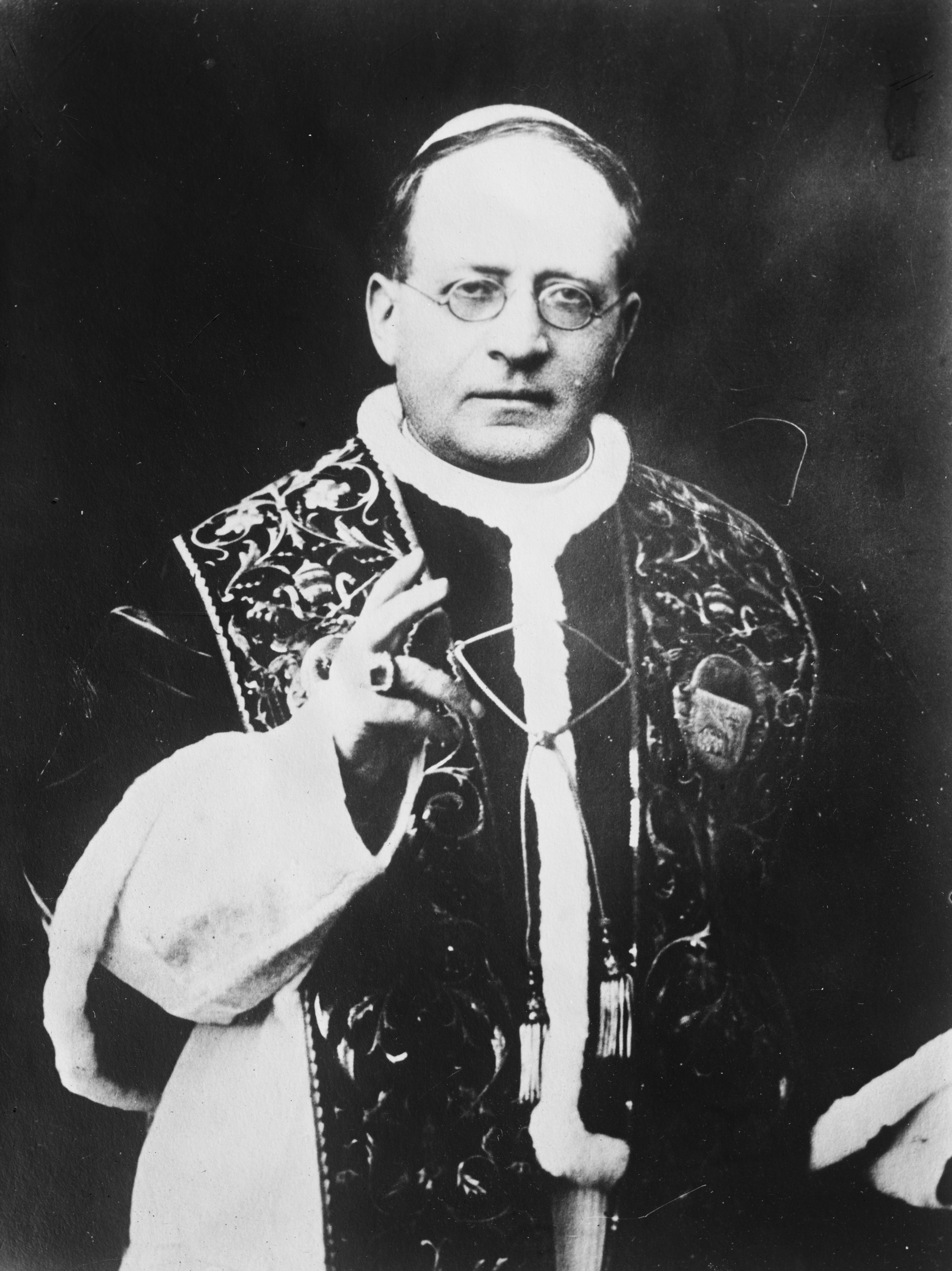
Pope Pius XI issued the anti-Nazi encyclical Mit brennender Sorge in 1937, partially drafted by Eugenio Pacelli.

Pope Pius XI's pontificate coincided with the early aftermath of the First World War. The old European monarchies had been largely swept away and a new, precarious order was forming; the Soviet Union rose in the east. The Fascist dictator Benito Mussolini took power in Italy, and in Germany the fragile Weimar Republic collapsed with the Nazi seizure of power.

==== Diplomacy ====
Pius XI's main diplomatic approach was to sign concordats, eighteen of which he forged during his pontificate. These concordats, however, were not proven "durable or creditable" and "wholly failed in their aim of safeguarding the institutional rights of the Church"; "Europe was entering a period in which such agreements were regarded as mere scraps of paper". He signed the Lateran Treaty and a concordat with Italy in 1929, confirming the existence of an independent Vatican City, in return for recognition of the Kingdom of Italy and papal neutrality in world conflicts; in Article 24 of the concordat, the papacy promised "to remain outside temporal conflicts unless the parties concerned jointly appealed for the pacifying mission of the Holy See".

Pius XI signed the Reichskoncordat in 1933, hoping to protect Catholicism under the Nazi government. Although the treaty was an extension of concordats signed with Prussia and Bavaria, it was "more like a surrender than anything else: it involved the suicide of the Centre Party." The German Catholic Church had been persecuted after the Nazi takeover. The Vatican was anxious to conclude a concordat with the new government, despite its ongoing attacks, and the Nazis began to breach the agreement shortly after it was signed. From 1933 to 1936, Pius made several written protests against the Nazis, and his attitude toward Italy changed in 1938 after Nazi racial policies were adopted there. Cardinal Eugenio Pacelli was Pius' secretary of state; Pacelli made about 55 protests against Nazi policies, including its "ideology of race".

Since the Nazi takeover, the Vatican had taken diplomatic action to defend German Jews of Germany; Pius urged Mussolini to ask Hitler to restrain Nazi antisemitism in the spring of 1933, and told a group of pilgrims that antisemitism was incompatible with Christianity. As the government began to institute its program of antisemitism, Pius (through Pacelli) ordered Berlin nuncio Cesare Orsenigo to "look into whether and how it may be possible to become involved" in their aid. Orsenigo was more concerned with the impact of Nazi anti-clericalism on German Catholics, however, than with helping German Jews. Cardinal Theodor Innitzer called him timid and ineffective in addressing the worsening situation for German Jews.

==== Encyclicals ====
Pius issued three encyclicals: against Italian Fascism (Non abbiamo bisogno; We Do Not Need to Acquaint You) in 1931, and against Nazism (Mit brennender Sorge; With Deep Concern) and Communism (Divini Redemptoris) in 1937. He also challenged the extre nationalism of the Action Française movement and antisemitism in the United States. Non abbiamo bisogno condemned fascism's "pagan worship of the State" and its "revolution which snatches the young from the Church and from Jesus Christ, and which inculcates in its own young people hatred, violence and irreverence." Cardinal Michael von Faulhaber drafted the Holy See's response to the Nazi-Fascist axis in January 1937; Pius issued Mit brennender Sorge in March, noting the "threatening storm clouds" of a religious war over Germany. He commissioned John LaFarge Jr. to draft an encyclical, Humani generis unitas (The Unity of the Human Race), demonstrating the incompatibility of Catholicism and racism. Pius did not issue the encyclical before his death; neither did Pius XII, fearing that it might antagonize Italy and Germany when he hoped to negotiate peace.

=== Pius XII ===
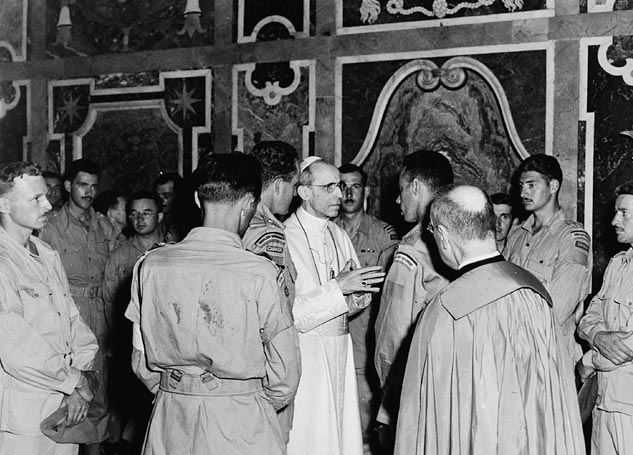
Members of the Canadian Royal 22nd Regiment in an audience with Pius after the 1944 liberation of Rome

Eugenio Pacelli was elected to succeed Pope Pius XI at the March 1939 papal conclave. Taking the name of his predecessor as a sign of continuity, he became Pope Pius XII and tried to broker peace during the run-up to the war. As the Holy See had done during the pontificate of Pope Benedict XV (1914–1922) during World War I, the Vatican under Pius XII pursued a policy of diplomatic neutrality throughout World War II; Pius, like Benedict, described Vatican neutrality as "impartiality". He did not identify the Nazis in his wartime condemnations of racism and genocide; although he was praised by world leaders and Jewish groups after his death in 1958 for saving the lives of thousands of Jews, the fact that he did not specifically condemn what was later called the Holocaust has tarnished his legacy.

Pius shared intelligence with the Allies about the German resistance and the planned invasion of the Low Countries early in the war, and lobbied Mussolini to remain neutral. He hoped for a negotiated peace to keep the conflict from spreading. Like-minded US President Franklin D. Roosevelt re-established American diplomatic relations with the Vatican after a seventy-year hiatus, dispatching Myron Charles Taylor as his representative. Pius warmly welcomed Roosevelt's envoy, who urged him to explicitly condemn Nazi atrocities; although Pius opposed the "evils of modern warfare", he did not go further.

Pius used Vatican Radio to promote aid to thousands of war refugees, and saved thousands of Jews by instructing the church to provide discreet aid. To confidantes, Hitler scorned him as a blackmailer who constricted Mussolini and leaked confidential German correspondence to the world; in return for church opposition, he vowed "retribution to the last farthing" after the war.

==== Early pontificate ====
Nazi authorities disapproved of Pacelli's election as pope: "So outspoken were Pacelli's criticisms that Hitler's government lobbied against him, trying to prevent his becoming the successor to Pius XI. When he did become Pope, as Pius XII, in March 1939, Nazi Germany was the only government not to send a representative to his coronation." Goebbels noted in a 4 March 1939 diary entry that Hitler was considering abrogating the Reichskoncordat: "This will surely happen when Pacelli undertakes his first hostile act".

According to Joseph Lichten, "Pacelli had obviously established his position clearly, for the Fascist governments of both Italy and Germany spoke out vigorously against the possibility of his election to succeed Pius XI in March 1939, though the cardinal secretary of state had served as papal nuncio in Germany from 1917 to 1929." Heinrich Himmler's SS newspaper, Das Schwarze Korps (The Black Corps), had called Pacelli a "co-conspirator with Jews and Communists against Nazism" and decried his election as "the "Chief Rabbi of the Christians, boss of the firm of Judah-Rome."

Pius selected Cardinal Luigi Maglione as his secretary of state, and retained Domenico Tardini and Giovanni Montini (the future Pope Paul VI) as undersecretaries of state. Although Maglione was pro-democracy and anti-dictatorship and "detested Hitler and thought Mussolini a clown", Pius largely reserved diplomatic matters for himself. Hoping to stop Hitler's war, he delivered a 24 August appeal for peace (the day after the signing of the Molotov–Ribbentrop Pact).

It has been argued that Pacelli dissuaded Pius XI—who was near death—from condemning Kristallnacht in November 1938. The draft of the proposed encyclical Humani generis unitas (On the Unity of Human Society), ready in September 1938, was not forwarded to the Vatican by Superior General of the Society of Jesus Wlodimir Ledóchowski. The draft encyclical clearly condemned colonialism, racism and antisemitism. Some historians have argued that Pacelli learned about its existence only after the death of Pius XI and did not promulgate it as Pope. (Note: On 16 March, four days after Pius XII's coronation, Gundlach told LaFarge that the documents were given to Pius XI shortly before his death but the new Pope had not yet read them.)

==== Summi Pontificatus ====
On 31 August (the day before the war), Pius wrote to the German, Polish, Italian, British and French governments that he was unwilling to abandon hope that pending negotiations might lead to "a just pacific solution" and beseeching the Germans and Polish "in the name of God" to avoid "any incident" and for the British, French and Italians to support his appeal. The "pending negotiations" were Nazi propaganda; the following day, Hitler invaded Poland.

Summi Pontificatus (On the Limitations of the Authority of the State), issued on 20 October 1939, established several themes of Pius' papacy. In diplomatic language, he endorsed Catholic resistance and disapproved of racism, antisemitism, the invasion of Poland, and church persecution. and calls on Italians to remain faithful to the church. Pius avoided accusing Hitler and Stalin, adopting an impartial public tone for which he has been criticised. In Poland, the Nazis murdered over 2,500 monks and priests; more were imprisoned.

==== Secret meetings with Nazi officials ====
Starting in 1939 Pius engaged in backchannel negotiations with Hitler. The existence of these talks was kept hidden by the Catholic Church until the opening of the Pius archives to scholars in 2020. The archives contain several transcripts and documents noting ongoing communications between Pius and Hitler largely through Philipp, Landgrave of Hesse, a Nazi official. Both sides took steps to prevent such meetings from becoming public knowledge. Furthermore, both sides expressed a desire to reach an agreement to achieve peace between the Reich and the Church. In January 1940, Pius gave Hesse a five-point memo on how to improve relations with the Church, all five of which were concerned with the rights and freedoms of the Church. Hitler agreed with this memo on principle and sent his foreign minister Joachim von Ribbentrop to publicly meet with the Pope in March. Meetings continued until the spring of 1941, but no formal agreement emerged. There is no indication that Pius brought up the Nazis' persecution of Jews as an issue throughout any of the meetings. Historian David Kertzer concluded that from the viewpoint of protecting the Church as an institution, the talks could be considered a success. However, he argues they were a "sharp disappointment" from the viewpoint of moral leadership as the Pope resisted great pressure to denounce the Nazi regime until the end.

==== Assistance ====
Holy See policy focused on preventing Mussolini from bringing Italy into the war. Italian Foreign Minister Galeazzo Ciano complained in April 1940 to Vatican Secretary of State Maglione that too many priests were preaching "sermons about peace and peace demonstrations, perhaps inspired by the Vatican", and the Italian ambassador to the Holy See complained that L'Osservatore Romano was too favourable to the democracies.

Pius advised the British in 1940 of the readiness of certain German generals to overthrow Hitler if they could be assured of an honourable peace, offered assistance to the German resistance in the event of a coup, and warned the Allies of the planned German invasion of the Low Countries in 1940. His private secretary, Robert Leiber, was the intermediary between Pius and the resistance. He met with Josef Müller, who visited Rome in 1939 and 1940. The Vatican considered Müller a representative of Colonel-General Ludwig Beck, and agreed to assist with mediation. The Vatican agreed to send a letter outlining the bases for peace with Britain, and papal participation was used to try to persuade senior German generals Halder and Brauchitsch to act against Hitler. When the Venlo Incident stalled the talks, the British agreed to resume discussions because of the "efforts of the Pope and the respect in which he was held. Chamberlain and Halifax set great store by the Pope's readiness to mediate." Although the British government remained non-committal, the resistance were encouraged by the talks and Müller told Leiber that a coup would take place in February.

On 4 May 1940, the Vatican advised the Dutch government envoy to the Vatican that the Germans planned to invade France through the Netherlands and Belgium six days later. Alfred Jodl noted in a 7 May diary entry that the Germans knew the Belgian envoy to the Vatican had been tipped of, and Hitler was agitated by the treachery. After the fall of France, peace overtures emanated from the Vatican, Sweden and the United States; Churchill responded that Germany would first have to free its conquered territories. In 1942, US envoy Myron C. Taylor thanked the Holy See for the "forthright and heroic expressions of indignation made by Pope Pius XII when Germany invaded the Low Countries". Müller was arrested in a 1943 raid on the Abwehr and spent the rest of the war in concentration camps, ending up at Dachau. The raid was a serious blow to the resistance, and Hans Bernd Gisevius replaced Müller.

After the Fall of France, Pius wrote confidentially to Hitler, Churchill and Mussolini proposing to mediate a "just and honourable peace" and asking for advice about how such an offer would be received. When the war turned against the Axis powers by 1943 and Ciano was relieved of his post and sent to the Vatican as ambassador, Hitler suspected that he was arranging a separate peace with the Allies.

==== Aid to Jews ====
At the end of Pius XI's pontificate, Pacelli received word from nuncios about increased persecution of German Jews. He developed a strategy to work behind the scenes to help them because, he believed, "any form of denunciation in the name of the Vatican would inevitably provoke further reprisals against the Jews". During his pontificate, Catholic institutions across Europe were opened to shelter Jews. Israeli historian Pinchas Lapide interviewed war survivors and concluded that Pius "was instrumental in saving at least 700,000, but probably as many as 860,000 Jews from certain death at Nazi hands"; although most historians dispute this estimate, Rabbi David Dalin called Lapide's book "the definitive work by a Jewish scholar" on the Holocaust.

In an open letter to the bishop of Cologne, Nuncio Pacelli described Hitler as a "false prophet of Lucifer"; Hitler returned his scorn. After Kristallnacht in 1938, the Vatican took steps to find refuge for Jews. L'Osservatore Romano reported that Pacelli (as secretary of state) condemned the pogrom. On 30 November, Pacelli sent an encoded message to archbishops around the world instructing them to apply for visas for "non-Aryan Catholics" to leave Germany. Although the Reichskoncordat had provided for the protection of Christian converts, Pacelli intended to extend the visas to all Jews; about 200,000 Jews escaped the Nazis with Vatican visas.

In accordance with secret orders from Pius, Giovanni Ferrofino obtained visas from the Portuguese government and the Dominican Republic to secure the escape of 10,000 Jews. In response to Mussolini's anti-Jewish legislation, Pacelli arranged for Jewish friends, doctors, scholars and scientists to emigrate to Palestine and the Americas; twenty-three were appointed in Vatican educational institutions. When war broke out, local bishops were instructed to assist those in need.

In 1940, Nazi Foreign Minister Joachim von Ribbentrop led the only senior Nazi delegation permitted an audience with Pius. Asked why the pope had sided with the Allies, Pius replied with a list of recent Nazi atrocities and religious persecutions committed against Christians and Jews in Germany and Poland; The New York Times reported the "burning words he spoke to Herr Ribbentrop about religious persecution". In 1942, Pius delivered a Christmas address on Vatican Radio expressing sympathy for victims of Nazi genocide. Holocaust historian Martin Gilbert assessed the response of the Reich Security Main Office (calling Pius a "mouthpiece" of the Jews) to his Christmas address as evidence that both sides knew for whom Pius was speaking. Pius protested the deportation of Slovak Jews to the Bratislava government in 1942; the following year, he wrote: "The Holy See would fail in its Divine Mandate if it did not deplore these measures, which gravely damage man in his natural right, mainly for the reason that these people belong to a certain race."

==== Public caution ====
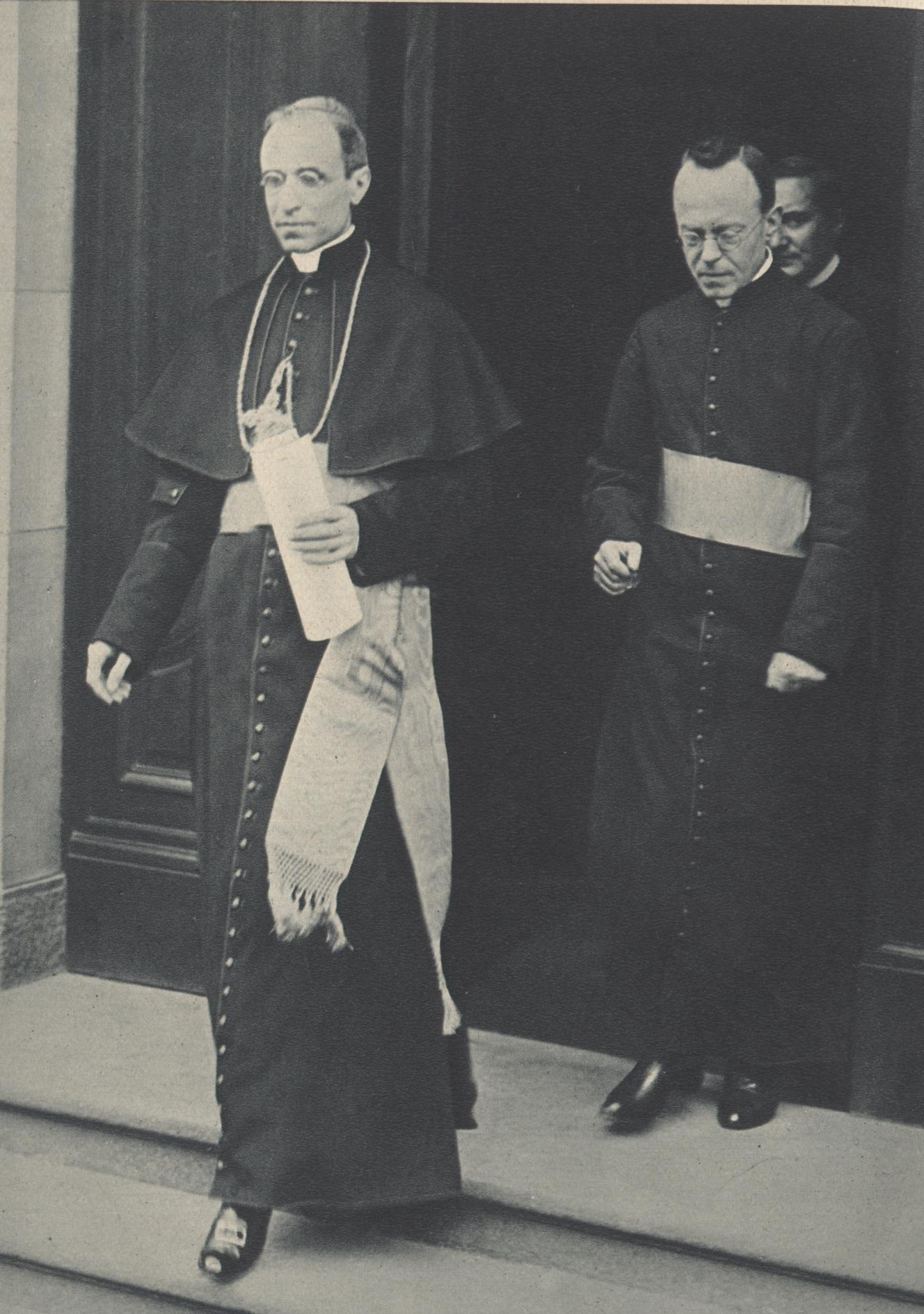
Pacelli (left) and Robert Leiber in 1929

In public, Pius spoke cautiously about Nazi crimes. When Myron Charles Taylor urged him to condemn Nazi atrocities, he "obliquely referred to the evils of modern warfare". In a conversation with Archbishop Giovanni Montini, Pius said: "We would like to utter words of fire against such actions; and the only thing restraining Us from speaking is the fear of making the plight of the victims worse". In June 1943, Pope Pius XII told the Sacred College of Cardinals in a secret address that: "Every word We address to the competent authority on this subject, and all Our public utterances have to be carefully weighed and measured by Us in the interests of the victims themselves, lest, contrary to Our intentions, We make their situation worse and harder to bear". Nazi brutality made an enormous impression on Pius. (Note: When Dutch bishops protested against the wartime deportation of Jews, the Nazis responded by increasing the deportation of Jews and Catholic converts. "The brutality of the retaliation made an enormous impression on Pius XII.") In December 1942, when Secretary of State Maglione was asked if Pius would issue a proclamation similar to the Allied "German Policy of Extermination of the Jewish Race", he replied that the Vatican was "unable to denounce publicly particular atrocities".

==== Criticism ====
Although the assessment of Pius's role during World War II was positive shortly after his death, historical documents have revealed his early knowledge of the Shoah and his refusal to perform vital actions in order to save Jews when the opportunities to do so presented themselves. For instance, see Saul Friedlander's documentation of the Pope's inaction and his documentation of the Pope's willingness to remain silent in the face of indisputable evidence of the murders. Some historians have accused him of being silent and antisemitic in the face of the Holocaust, but other historians have defended him. Prominent members of the Jewish community, including Rabbi Yitzhak HaLevi Herzog, have refuted criticism of Pius' efforts to protect Jews. During the summer of 1942, Pius explained to the College of Cardinals the theological gulf between Jews and Christians: "Jerusalem has responded to His call and to His grace with the same rigid blindness and stubborn ingratitude that has led it along the path of guilt to the murder of God." Guido Knopp called Pius' comments "incomprehensible" at a time when "Jerusalem was being murdered by the million". During the mass roundup and deportation of Jews in Rome, Pius was aware but did not speak out against it publicly. After being held for two days near the Vatican, they were then sent to the Auschwitz concentration camp.

John Cornwell's 1999 book, Hitler's Pope, alleged that Pius legitimised the Nazis when he signed the 1933 Reichskonkordat. Cornwell accused Pius of being antisemitic and he also accused Pius of subordinating opposition to the Nazis to his desire to increase and centralise papal power. A number of historians have refuted Cornwell's conclusions; he later moderated his accusations, saying that it was "impossible to judge [Pius'] motives" but "nevertheless, due to his ineffectual and diplomatic language in respect of the Nazis and the Jews, I still believe that it was incumbent on him to explain his failure to speak out after the war. This he never did." Historian John Toland noted: "The Church, under the Pope's guidance ... saved the lives of more Jews than all other churches, religious institutions and rescue organizations combined ... hiding thousands of Jews in its monasteries, convents and the Vatican itself. The record of the Allies was far more shameful".

The conversion of Jews to Catholicism during the Holocaust remains controversial: "This is a key point because, in debates about Pius XII, his defenders regularly point to his denunciations of racism and his defense of Jewish converts as evidence of his opposition to antisemitism of all sorts". The Holocaust exemplifies the "recurrent and acutely painful issue in the Catholic-Jewish dialogue, ... Christian efforts to convert Jews". Martin Gilbert noted the heavy involvement of the Christian churches in the rescue of the Jews, writing that many of the rescued eventually converted to Christianity out of a "sense of belonging to the religion of the rescuers. It was the price – the penalty, from a strictly Orthodox Jewish perspective – that was paid hundreds, even thousands, of times for the gift of life."

== Ratlines ==
After the war, clandestine networks smuggled fugitive Axis officials out of Europe; the US codenamed the networks "Ratlines". Pro-Nazi Austrian bishop Alois Hudal was a link in the chain in Rome, and the Pontifical Croatian College of St. Jerome offered refuge to Croatian fugitives guided by Krunoslav Draganović. Catholics and non-Nazi Catholic leaders, arrested as potential dissenters in the new Communist republics forming in Eastern Europe, sought to emigrate; the migration was exploited by some Axis fugitives. Potential anti-Communist leaders such as anti-Nazi Archbishop József Mindszenty in Hungary, the Żegota Jewish-aid council in Poland, and Croatian Archbishop of Zagreb Aloysius Stepinac were framed by anti-Catholic governments.

Bishop Alois Hudal, former rector of the Collegio Teutonico in Rome (a seminary for German and Austrian priests), was a covert Nazi and an informant for German intelligence. Gerald Steinacher wrote that Hudal was close to Pius XII for many years prior, and was an influential ratline figure. The Vatican Refugee Committees for Croats, Slovenes, Ukrainians and Hungarians aided former fascists and Nazi collaborators to escape those countries.

Rome was advised that the Socialist Federal Republic of Yugoslavia was threatening to destroy Catholicism, and the church believed that the risk of handing over the innocent could be "greater than the danger that some of the guilty should escape". Croatian priest Krunoslav Dragonovic aided Croatian fascists to escape through Rome. Evidence suggests that Pius XII tacitly approved his work; according to reports from Counterintelligence Corps agent Robert Mudd, about 100 Ustaše were in hiding at the Pontifical Croatian College of St. Jerome in the hope of reaching Argentina (with Vatican knowledge). Within days of Pius' death in 1958, Vatican officials asked Draganović to leave the college. Until then, however, Draganović "was a law unto himself and ran his own show". In 1948, he brought Nazi collaborator and wanted war criminal Ante Pavelić to the Pontifical Latin American College disguised as a priest until Argentine President Juan Perón invited him to his country.

According to Michael Hesemann, Nazi refugees used escape routes that the Catholic Church created to save Jewish asylum seekers during World War II. Catholic clergy smuggled Jews from Germany and German-occupied Austria through "monastery routes"(*Klosterroute*), where they either lived in Italian refugee camps in relative safety or were given falsified papers and emigrated to South America. Krunoslav Draganović, a Croat priest associated with Ustaše, started working for American CIC in 1947 to provide escape routes for "useful" Nazi collaborators.

During German occupation of Rome in 1943, Hudal intervened in the name of the Pope and declared religious buildings in Rome to be the territory of Vatican, forbidding German soldiers from entering them and saving about 4300 of Roman Jews. Thus Vatican allowed Hudal to instigate efforts to help Austrian refugees after the war. Hudal was gradually sidelined by Vatican when he admitted to helping Otto Wächter and Franz Stangl escape persecution – Vatican clergy started calling for his removal, and in 1949 he was denied papal audience and asked to leave. In 1951, Pope Pius XII demanded for removal of Hudal, who then resigned a year later.

== Post-war attitudes ==
Western officers in Allied-occupied Germany often consulted with clergy when appointing new, non-Nazi officials, although distinguishing between Catholic clergy acting in the public interest and as Centre Party leaders was difficult. On 31 May 1945 the military government in allowed Corpus Christi Day parades. Local officials attended for the first time since the beginning of Nazi rule.

Since the end of World War II, the church has honoured Catholic resistors and victims of Nazism and issued statements of repentance for its failings and those of its members during the Nazi era. Pius XII elevated a number of high-profile resistors of Nazism to the College of Cardinals in 1946. Among them were Bishop Josef Frings of Cologne, who succeeded Cardinal Bertram as chairman of the Fulda Bishops' Conference in July 1945, Clemens August Graf von Galen of Münster, and Konrad von Preysing of Berlin. Pius also selected resistors in other countries: Dutch Archbishop Johannes de Jong; Hungarian Bishop József Mindszenty; Polish Archbishop Adam Stefan Sapieha; and French Archbishop Jules-Géraud Saliège. Italian papal diplomat Angelo Roncalli (later Pope John XXIII) and Polish Archbishop Stefan Wyszyński were elevated in 1953.

Of the post-war popes, John XXIII and Paul VI were actively involved in the protection of Jews during the war. Pope Benedict XVI (Joseph Ratzinger) grew up in Nazi Germany. Enrolled in the Hitler Youth at 14, he was drafted as a Luftwaffenhelfer two years later. Ratzinger deserted at the end of the war and was briefly held as a prisoner of war. His 2008 support of the canonization of Pope Pius XII was controversial. On his first visit to Germany as pope, Benedict went to the Roonstrasse Synagogue in Cologne and denounced antisemitism.

=== John Paul II ===
Pope John Paul II endured the Nazi occupation of Poland, was involved in the Polish cultural resistance and joined a clandestine seminary during the war. In 1979, soon after his election, he visited Auschwitz concentration camp to pay homage to those who died there. The Vatican published We Remember: A Reflection on the Shoah in 1998. John Paul said that he hoped the document would "help heal the wounds of past misunderstandings and injustices", and described the wartime sufferings of the Jews as a "crime" and "indelible stain" on history. We Remember noted a "duty of remembrance" that the "inhumanity with which the Jews were persecuted and massacred during this century is beyond the capacity of words to convey", repudiating persecution and condemning genocide. Although it acknowledged "long-standing sentiments of mistrust and hostility that we call anti-Judaism", it distinguished them from the Nazis' racial antisemitism and concluded with a call for penitence.

In 2000, John Paul apologized to the Jews on behalf of all people by inserting a prayer at the Western Wall: "We're deeply saddened by the behavior of those in the course of history who have caused the children of God to suffer, and asking your forgiveness, we wish to commit ourselves to genuine brotherhood with the people of the Covenant." The papal apology emphasized church guilt for, and the Second Vatican Council's condemnation of, antisemitism. The church acknowledged its use of forced labour during the Nazi era; Cardinal Karl Lehmann said, "It should not be concealed that the Catholic Church was blind for too long to the fate and suffering of men, women and children from the whole of Europe who were carted off to Germany as forced laborers".

=== Francis ===
In June 2018, Pope Francis urged the Catholic Church to never forget the Shoah (the Holocaust): "It should be a constant warning for all of us of an obligation to reconciliation, of reciprocal comprehension and love toward our 'elder brothers', the Jews". Francis agreed to open the Holocaust-era Vatican Archives in March 2019. In an August 2019 La Stampa interview, Francis said: "I am worried because you hear speeches that resemble those by Hitler in 1934." He had previously denounced populism for leading to the rise of Hitler.

== Admitting guilt ==
On 29 April 2020, the German Catholic bishops issued a statement criticising the behaviour of their predecessors under the Nazis. The statement said that, during the Nazi regime, the bishops did not oppose the war of annihilation started by Germany or the crimes the regime committed, and that they gave the war a religious meaning.

== See also ==
- Nazi persecution of the Catholic Church in Germany
- Catholic Church and Nazi Germany during World War II
- Catholic clergy involvement with the Ustaše
- Raphael's Verein
- Pius Wars

== Bibliography ==
- Baranowski, Shelley (2011). Nazi Empire: German Colonialism and Imperialism from Bismarck to Hitler. Cambridge UP. ISBN 978-0-521-85739-0.
- Berben, Paul (1975). Dachau, 1933–1945: the official history. Norfolk Press. ISBN 978-0-85211-009-6.
- Blainey, Geoffrey (2011). A Short History of Christianity. Penguin. ISBN 978-1-74253-416-9.
- Bokenkotter, Thomas (2004). A Concise History of the Catholic Church. Doubleday. ISBN 978-0-385-50584-0.
- Bullock, Alan (1991). Hitler: A Study in Tyranny. HarperCollins. ISBN 978-0-06-092020-3.
- Chadwick, Owen (1995). A History of Christianity. Barnes & Noble. ISBN 978-0-7607-7332-1.
- Conway, John S. (1997). The Nazi Persecution of the Churches, 1933–1945. Regent College. ISBN 978-1-57383-080-5.
- Coppa, Frank J. (1999). Controversial Concordats. Catholic University of America Press. ISBN 978-0-8132-0920-3.
- Courtois, Stephane; Kramer, Mark (1999). The Black Book of Communism. Harvard University Press. ISBN 978-0-674-07608-2.
- Duffy, Eamon (1997). Saints and Sinners, a History of the Popes. Yale University Press. ISBN 978-0-300-07332-4.
- Ericksen, Robert (2012). Complicity in the Holocaust: Churches and Universities in Nazi Germany. Cambridge UP. ISBN 978-1-107-66333-6.
- Evans, Richard J. (2008). The Third Reich at War. Penguin. ISBN 978-1-59420-206-3.
- Falconi, Carlo (1967). The Popes in the twentieth century: from Pius X to John XXIII. Muriel Grindrod (trans). Weidenfeld & Nicolson.
- Fest, Joachim (1997). Plotting Hitler's Death: The Story of German Resistance. Henry Holt and Company. ISBN 978-0-8050-5648-8.
- Fulbrook, Mary (1991). The Fontana History of Germany: 1918–1990, The Divided Nation. Fontana.
- Gill, Anton (1994). An Honourable Defeat; A History of the German Resistance to Hitler. Heinemann Mandarin. 1995 paperback ISBN 978-0-434-29276-9.
- The German Resistance to Hitler. U of California P. 1970. ISBN 978-0-520-01662-0.
- Hamerow, Theodore S. (1997). On the Road to the Wolf's Lair: German Resistance to Hitler. Harvard University Press. ISBN 978-0-674-63680-4.
- Hebblethwaite, Peter (1993). Paul VI: The First Modern Pope. Paulist Press. ISBN 978-0-8091-0461-1.
- Hitler, Adolf; Norman Cameron; R. H. Stevens; Hugh R. Trevor-Roper (2000). Hitler's Table Talk: 1941–1944. Enigma Books. ISBN 978-1-929631-05-6.
- Kershaw, Ian (2008). Hitler: A Biography. London: Norton.
- Lapomarda, Vincent A., The Catholic Bishops of Europe and the Nazi Persecutions of Catholics and Jews, The Edwin Mellen Press (2012)
- Laqueur, Walter (1996). Fascism: Past, Present, Future. Oxford UP. ISBN 978-0-19-511793-6.
- Lewy, Guenter (2000) [1965]. The Catholic Church And Nazi Germany. Da Capo Press. ISBN 978-0-7867-5161-7.
- McGonigle (1996). A History of the Christian Tradition: From its Jewish roots to the Reformation. Paulist Press. ISBN 978-0-8091-3648-3.
- Norman, Edward (2007). The Roman Catholic Church, An Illustrated History. U of California P. ISBN 978-0-520-25251-6.
- Pham, John Peter (2006). Heirs of the Fisherman: Behind the Scenes of Papal Death and Succession. Oxford UP. ISBN 978-0-19-517834-0.
- Phayer, Michael (2000). The Catholic Church and the Holocaust, 1930–1965. Bloomington and Indianapolis: Indiana University Press. ISBN 978-0253214713.
- Phayer, Michael (2008). Pius XII, the Holocaust, and the Cold War. Bloomington and Indianapolis: Indiana University Press. ISBN 9780253349309.
- Rhodes, Anthony (1973). The Vatican in the Age of the Dictators (1922–1945). Holt, Rinehart and Winston. ISBN 9780030077364.
- Shirer, William L. (1960). The Rise and Fall of the Third Reich. London: Secker & Warburg.
- Shirer, William L. (1990). The Rise and Fall of the Third Reich. Simon and Schuster. ISBN 978-0-671-72868-7.
- Ventresca, Robert A. (2013). Soldier of Christ: The Life of Pope Pius XII. Harvard UP. ISBN 978-0-674-06730-1.
- Vidmar, John (2005). The Catholic Church Through the Ages. Paulist Press. ISBN 978-0-8091-4234-7.
