= Körner =

German surname

Körner, also rendered Koerner or Korner, is a German surname, an occupational name for a grain merchant or possibly for the administrator of a granary. Notable people with the surname include:

- August Theodor Koerner (1843–1912), American businessman and politician
- Brendan I. Koerner (born 1974), American author
- Brody Koerner (born 1993), American baseball player
- Charles Koerner (1896–1946), American film producer
- E. F. K. Koerner (1939–2022), German author and linguist
- Ernst Koerner (1846–1927), German painter
- Friedrich Körner (1921–1998), German general and fighter pilot during World War II
- Gustav Koerner (1809–1896), German-American jurist
- Hal Koerner (born 1976), American ultramarathon runner
- Harry G. Koerner (c. 1881–1935), American architect
- Heike Koerner (born 1973), Mexican swimmer
- Henry Koerner (1915–1991), Austrian-American painter
- Jim Koerner (born 1975), American baseball player
- John Koerner (1938–2024), American singer-songwriter
- John Koerner (artist) (1913–2014), Czech-born Canadian artist
- Joseph Koerner (born 1958), American art historian
- Leon Joseph Koerner (1892–1972), Canadian businessman
- Milton Koerner (1910–1980), American politician
- Rebecca Koerner (born 2000), Danish cyclist
- Robert M. Koerner (1933–2019), American engineer and academic
- Roy Koerner (1932–2008), British explorer
- Walter Koerner (1898–1995), Canadian businessman
- Alexis Korner (1928–1984), British blues musician and radio broadcaster
- Alfred Körner (1926–2020), Austrian footballer
- Asher Korner (1929–1971), British biochemist
- Bärbel Körner, West German slalom canoeist
- Christian Körner (born 1949), Austrian-Swiss academic
- Christian Gottfried Körner (1756–1831), German writer
- Christoph Körner (born 1962), German basketball player
- David Korner (1914–1976), French communist militant, trade unionist, and journalist
- Diana Körner (born 1944), German actress
- Edith Körner (1921–2000), British health service reformer
- Emil Körner (1846–1920), Prussian-born Chilean general
- Emma Körner (1788–1815), German painter
- Erhard Körner, German luger
- Ewald Körner (1926–2010), German-Swiss clarinetist and conductor
- Friedrich Körner (1921–1998), German general and fighter pilot during World War II
- Gerhard Körner (1941–2025), German football player and manager
- Heinrich Körner (trade unionist) (1892–1945), German Catholic trade unionist and member of the resistance to Nazism
- Heinz Körner (1893–1961), Austrian footballer and coach
- Herbert Körner (1902–1966), German cinematographer
- Hermine Körner (1878–1960), German actress, director and theater manager
- Hildegard Körner (born 1959), German middle-distance runner
- Ingeborg Körner (born 1929), German actress
- János Körner (born 1946), Hungarian mathematician
- Joanna Korner (born 1951), British judge
- Johanna Korner (1891–1969), Beauty salon proprietor
- John Korner (born 1967), Danish artist
- Julius Körner (1870–1954), German rower
- Klaus-Michael Körner (1952–2022), German politician
- Konrad Körner (born 1992), German politician
- Kurt Körner (1912–1949), German ski jumper
- Kurt Korner (born 1937), Liechtenstein politician
- Lutz Körner, German slalom canoeist
- Magnus Körner (1808–1864), Swedish artist and scientific illustrator
- Martin Körner (born 1935), German Nordic combined skier
- Moritz Körner (born 1990), German politician
- Olga Körner (1887–1969), German politician
- Otto Körner (1858–1935), German otorhinolaryngologist
- Paul Korner (1925–2012), Australian physician
- Paul Körner (1893–1957), German Nazi official
- Raoul Korner (born 1974), Austrian professional basketball coach
- Robert Körner (1924–1989), Austrian footballer
- Rudolf Körner (1892–1978), German gymnast
- Stefan Körner (born 1968), German politician
- Stephan Körner (1913–2000), British philosopher
- Susan Catherine Koerner Wright (1831–1889), Mother of the Wright brothers
- Theodor Körner (Austrian politician) (1873–1957), President of Austria from 1951 to 1957
- Theodor Körner (author) (1791–1813), German poet
- Theodor Körner (German politician) (1941–2018), German jurist and politician
- Thomas William Körner (born 1946), British mathematician
- Ulrich Körner (born 1962), German-Swiss business executive
- Víctor Körner (1856–1946), Chilean politician
- Vladimír Körner (born 1939), Czech novelist and screenwriter
- Wilhelm Körner (1839–1925), German chemist
- Wilhelm Heinrich Detlev Körner (1878–1938), American illustrator

== See also ==
- Korn (disambiguation)
