= Otto Müller (priest) =

Fr. Otto Müller
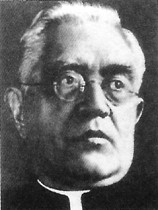
- Native name: Otto Mueller

Orders
- Ordination: 1894

Personal details
- Born: 1870
- Died: 12 October 1944 (aged 73–74) Berlin Police Hospital
- Denomination: Roman Catholic

Fr. Otto Müller (English: Otto Mueller) (1870–1944) was a German Roman Catholic priest, active in the Christian Worker's movement and the German Resistance against Adolf Hitler's Nazi regime. Implicated in the July Plot, Müller died in custody in 1944.

== Biography ==
Müller was ordained as a Catholic priest in 1894. He became active in supporting the development of a Christian workers’ movement and in 1918, became president of the West German Federation of the Catholic Workers’ Movement. From 1919 to 1933 he served as a Catholic Centre Party delegate on the municipal councils in Mönchengladbach and Cologne.

Following the Nazi takeover, the Catholic Church in Germany sought an accord with the new Government and signed the Reich concordat in effort to safeguard Church autonomy. Müller was initially convinced that the Concordat would protect Catholic Church's activities, but soon began to oppose the bishops’ submissive policy toward the Nazi regime. He called on the Church to take up a clear position against the legal violations of the Nazis. Müller had been in contact with the military opposition before the beginning of World War II, and later allowed Resistance figures to use the Ketteler-Haus in Cologne for discussions.

Since 1927, Fr. Müller was involved in the resistance against National Socialism. He involved himself in planning the reorganisation of post-Nazi Germany with leading Resistance figures like the Christian trade unionists Jakob Kaiser, Bernhard Letterhaus and the Blessed Nikolaus Gross, in whom the Catholic religion had motivated a determination to resist. On 20 July 1944, the Operation Valkyrie attempt was made to assassinate Adolf Hitler, inside his Wolf's Lair field headquarters in East Prussia. The plot was the culmination of the efforts of several groups in the German Resistance to overthrow the Nazi government. The failure of both the assassination and the military coup d'état which was planned to follow it led to the arrest of at least 7,000 people by the Gestapo. The Gestapo arrested the Cologne conspirators. Müller, seriously ill, was imprisoned in the Berlin Police Hospital. There he died on 12 October 1944.

== See also ==
- Catholic Church and Nazi Germany
- Kirchenkampf
