= Nazi persecution of the Catholic Church in Germany =

Nazi persecution of the Catholic Church

The Roman Catholic Church suffered persecution in Nazi Germany. The Nazis claimed jurisdiction over all collective and social activity. Clergy were watched closely, and frequently denounced, arrested and sent to Nazi concentration camps. Welfare institutions were interfered with or transferred to state control. Catholic schools, press, trade unions, political parties and youth leagues were eradicated. Anti-Catholic propaganda and "morality" trials were staged. Monasteries and convents were targeted for expropriation. Prominent Catholic lay leaders were murdered, and thousands of Catholic activists were arrested.

In all, an estimated one third of German priests faced some form of reprisal in Nazi Germany and 400 German priests were sent to the dedicated Priest Barracks of Dachau Concentration Camp. Of the 2,720 clergy imprisoned at Dachau from Germany and occupied territories, 2,579 (or 94.88%) were Catholic.

== Background ==
The Nazis' long term plan was to de-Christianize Germany after final victory in the war. Their ideology could not accept an autonomous establishment, whose legitimacy did not spring from the government, and they desired the subordination of the church to the state. Catholics were suspected of insufficient patriotism, disloyalty to the Fatherland, or serving the interests of "sinister alien forces". Aggressive anti-Church radicals like Joseph Goebbels and Martin Bormann saw the conflict with the Churches as a priority concern, and anti-church sentiments were strong among grassroots party activists. In the short term, Hitler was prepared to restrain his anti-clericalism, seeing danger in strengthening the Church by persecution.

In the 1920s and 1930s, Catholic leaders made a number of attacks on Nazi ideology and the main Christian opposition to Nazism had come from the Catholic Church. German bishops energetically denounced its "false doctrines". They warned Catholics against Nazi racism and some dioceses banned membership in the Nazi Party, while the Catholic press criticized the Nazi movement. In his history of the German Resistance, Hamerow wrote:

The Catholic Church ... had generally viewed the Nazi Party with fear and suspicion. It had felt threatened by a radical ultranationalist ideology that regarded the papacy as a sinister, alien institution, that opposed denominational separatism in education and culture, and that at times appeared to promote a return to Nordic paganism. The establishment of the Third Reich seemed to portend the coming of a bitter conflict between church and state

— Extract from Theodore S. Hamerow's On the Road to the Wolf's Lair - German Resistance to Hitler

== Persecution in Germany ==
Following the war, the American Office of Strategic Services collected evidence for the Nuremberg Trials on the nature and extent of the Nazi persecution of the churches. Different steps it noted included the campaign for the suppression of denominational and youth organisations, the campaign against denominational schools, and the defamation campaign against the clergy. In a report entitled The Nazi Master Plan: The Persecution of the Christian Churches, the OSS said:

Throughout the period of National Socialist rule, religious liberties in Germany and in the occupied areas were seriously impaired. The various Christian Churches were systematically cut off from effective communication with the people. They were confined as far as possible to the performance of narrowly religious functions, and even within this narrow sphere were subjected to as many hindrances as the Nazis dared to impose. These results were accomplished partly by legal and partly by illegal and terroristic means.

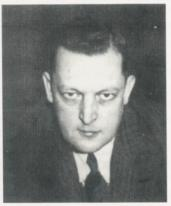
Adalbert Probst, national director of the Catholic Youth Sports Association, murdered in the Night of the Long Knives

Hitler moved quickly to eliminate Political Catholicism. The Nazis arrested thousands of members of the German Centre Party. The Catholic Bavarian People's Party government had been overthrown by a Nazi coup on 9 March 1933. Two thousand functionaries of the Party were rounded up by police in late June, and it, along with the national Centre Party, was dissolved in early July. The dissolution left modern Germany without a Catholic Party for the first time. Vice Chancellor Franz von Papen meanwhile negotiated a Reich Concordat with the Vatican, which prohibited clergy from participating in politics. Ian Kershaw wrote that the Vatican was anxious to reach agreement with the new government, despite "continuing molestation of Catholic clergy, and other outrages committed by Nazi radicals against the Church and its organisations". Hitler, nevertheless, had a "blatant disregard" for the Concordat, wrote Paul O'Shea, and its signing was to him merely a first step in the "gradual suppression of the Catholic Church in Germany". Anton Gill wrote that "with his usual irresistible, bullying technique, Hitler then proceeded to take a mile where he had been given an inch" and closed all Catholic institutions whose functions were not strictly religious:

It quickly became clear that [Hitler] intended to imprison the Catholics, as it were, in their own churches. They could celebrate mass and retain their rituals as much as they liked, but they could have nothing at all to do with German society otherwise. Catholic schools and newspapers were closed, and a propaganda campaign against the Catholics was launched.

— Extract from An Honourable Defeat by Anton Gill

Almost immediately, the Nazis promulgated their sterilization law—the Law for the Prevention of Hereditarily Diseased Offspring—an offensive policy in the eyes of the Catholic Church. Days later, moves began to dissolve the Catholic Youth League. Political Catholicism was also among the targets of Hitler's 1934 Long Knives purge: those executed included the head of Catholic Action, Erich Klausener; Papen's speech writer and advisor Edgar Jung (also a Catholic Action worker); and the national director of the Catholic Youth Sports Association, Adalbert Probst. Former Centre Party Chancellor Heinrich Brüning narrowly escaped execution.

William Shirer wrote that the German people were not greatly aroused by the persecution of the churches by the Nazi Government. The great majority were not moved to face imprisonment for the sake of freedom of worship, being too impressed by Hitler's early successes. Few, he said, paused to reflect that the Nazi regime intended to destroy Christianity and substitute the old paganism of the early tribal Germanic gods and the new paganism of the Nazi extremists. Anti-Nazi sentiment grew in Catholic circles as the Nazi government increased its repressive measures. Hoffmann writes that, from the beginning:

[The Catholic Church] could not silently accept the general persecution, regimentation or oppression, nor in particular the sterilization law of summer 1933. Over the years until the outbreak of war Catholic resistance stiffened until finally its most eminent spokesman was the Pope himself with his encyclial Mit brennender Sorge ... of 14 March 1937, read from all German Catholic pulpits. Clemens August Graf von Galen, Bishop of Münster, was typical of the many fearless Catholic speakers. In general terms, therefore, the churches were the only major organisations to offer comparatively early and open resistance: they remained so in later years.

— Extract from The History of the German Resistance 1933–1945 by Peter Hoffmann

=== Himmler and the SS ===
Under Himmler's deputy, Reinhard Heydrich, the Security Police and SD were responsible for suppressing enemies of the Nazi state, including "political churches"—such as Lutheran and Catholic clergy who opposed the Hitler regime. Such dissidents were arrested and sent to concentration camps. According to Himmler biographer Peter Longerich, Himmler was vehemently opposed to Christian sexual morality and the "principle of Christian mercy", both of which he saw as a dangerous obstacle to his planned battle with "subhumans". In 1937 he wrote:

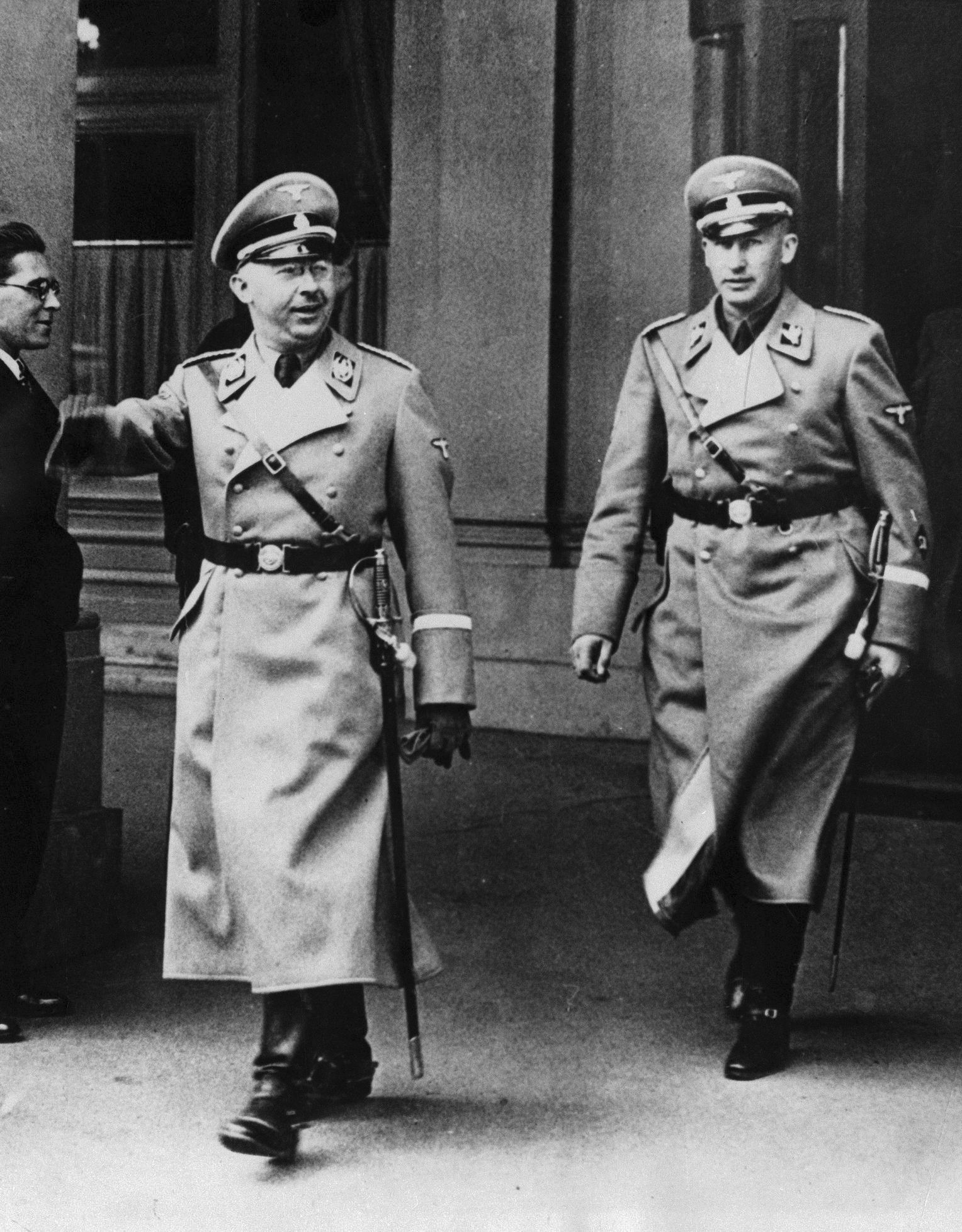
Heinrich Himmler (L) and Reinhard Heydrich (R) were vehement anti-Catholics.

We live in an era of the ultimate conflict with Christianity. It is part of the mission of the SS to give the German people in the next half century the non-Christian ideological foundations on which to lead and shape their lives. This task does not consist solely in overcoming an ideological opponent but must be accompanied at every step by a positive impetus: in this case that means the reconstruction of the German heritage in the widest and most comprehensive sense.

— Heinrich Himmler, 1937

Himmler saw the main task of his Schutzstaffel (SS) organisation to be that of "acting as the vanguard in overcoming Christianity and restoring a 'Germanic' way of living" in order to prepare for the coming conflict between "humans and subhumans": Longerich wrote that, while the Nazi movement as a whole launched itself against Jews and Communists, "by linking de-Christianisation with re-Germanization, Himmler had provided the SS with a goal and purpose all of its own." He set about making his SS the focus of a "cult of the Teutons".

=== Targeting of clergy ===
Clergy, nuns and lay leaders were targeted following the Nazi takeover, often on trumped up charges of currency smuggling or "immorality". Priests were watched closely and frequently denounced, arrested and sent to concentration camps. From 1940, a dedicated Clergy Barracks had been established at Dachau concentration camp. Intimidation of clergy was widespread. Cardinal Michael von Faulhaber was shot at. Cardinal Theodor Innitzer had his Vienna residence ransacked in October 1938 and Bishop Johannes Baptista Sproll of Rottenburg was jostled and his home vandalised. In 1937, the New York Times reported that Christmas would see "several thousand Catholic clergymen in prison." Propaganda satirized the clergy, including Anderl Kern's play The Last Peasant.

In the 1936 campaign against the monasteries and convents, the authorities charged 276 members of religious orders with the offence of homosexuality. 1935–36 was the height of the "immorality" trials against priests, monks, lay-brothers and nuns. In the United States, protests were organised in response to the trials, including a June 1936, petition signed by 48 clergymen, including rabbis and Protestant pastors: "We lodge a solemn protest against the almost unique brutality of the attacks launched by the German government charging Catholic clergy ... in the hope that the ultimate suppression of all Jewish and Christian beliefs by the totalitarian state can be effected." Winston Churchill wrote disapprovingly in the British press of the regime's treatment of "the Jews, Protestants and Catholics of Germany".

The regime had to consider the possibility of nationwide protests if prominent clerics were arrested. While hundreds of ordinary clergy were sent to concentration camps, just one German Catholic bishop was briefly imprisoned in a concentration camp, and just one other expelled from his diocese. This reflected also the cautious approach adopted by the hierarchy, who felt secure only in commenting on matters which transgressed on the ecclesiastical sphere.

Documents used in evidence at the Nuremberg Trials show that the Nazis were cautious with regard to the murder of church leaders, and conscious of not wanting to create martyrs. Nevertheless, Catholic leaders frequently faced violence or the threat of violence, particularly at the hands of the SA, the SS or Hitler Youth. A number of cases were cited by the OSS, including three demonstrations against Bishop Sproll of Rottenburg in 1938, one against Archbishop Caspar Klein of Paderborn, two attacks against Bishop Franz Rudolf Bornewasser of Trier, and various against Cardinal Faulhaber.

From 1940, the Gestapo launched an intense persecution of the monasteries. The Provincial of the Dominican Province of Teutonia, Laurentius Siemer, a spiritual leader of the German Resistance was influential in the Committee for Matters Relating to the Orders, which formed in response to Nazi attacks against Catholic monasteries and aimed to encourage the bishops to intercede on behalf of the Orders and oppose the Nazi state more emphatically. Figures like Galen and Preysing attempted to protect German priests from arrest. In Galen's famous 1941 anti-euthanasia sermons, he denounced the confiscations of church properties. He attacked the Gestapo for converting church properties to their own purposes—including use as cinemas and brothels. He protested the mistreatment of Catholics in Germany: the arrests and imprisonment without legal process, the suppression of the monasteries and the expulsion of religious orders.

Jesuit historian Vincent A. Lapomarda writes that Hitler campaigned against the Jesuits, closing their schools and confiscating or destroying their property, imprisoning or exiling thousands, and killing 259 of them—including 152 who died in Nazi concentration camps. The superior of the Order in Germany, Fr Anton Rosch, was imprisoned, brutalised and scheduled for execution when rescued by Soviet troops at the end of the war.

=== Suppression of the Catholic press ===
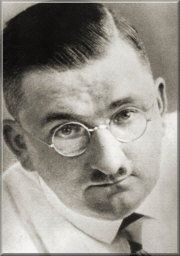
Fritz Gerlich, editor of Munich's Catholic weekly, murdered in the Night of the Long Knives

The flourishing Catholic press of Germany faced censorship. Finally in March 1941 Goebbels banned all Church media, on the pretext of a "paper shortage". In 1933, the Nazis established a Reich Chamber of Authorship and Reich Press Chamber under the Reich Cultural Chamber of the Ministry for Propaganda. Dissident writers were terrorised. The June–July 1934 Night of the Long Knives purge was the culmination of this campaign. Fritz Gerlich, the editor of Munich's Catholic weekly, Der Gerade Weg, was killed in the purge for his strident criticism of the Nazi movement. Writer and theologian Dietrich von Hildebrand was forced to flee Germany. The poet Ernst Wiechert protested the government's attitudes to the arts, calling them "spiritual murder". He was arrested and taken to Dachau Concentration Camp. Hundreds of arrests and closure of Catholic presses followed the issuing of Pope Pius XI's Mit brennender Sorge anti-Nazi encyclical. Nikolaus Gross, a Christian Trade Unionist, and director of the West German Workers' Newspaper Westdeutschen Arbeiterzeitung, was declared a martyr and beatified by Pope John Paul II in 2001. Declared an enemy of the state in 1938, his newspaper was shut down. He was arrested in the July Plot round up, and executed on 23 January 1945.

=== Suppression of Catholic education ===
When in 1933, the Nazi school superintendent of Munster issued a decree that religious instruction be combined with discussion of the "demoralising power" of the "people of Israel", Bishop Clemens von Galen of Münster refused, writing that such interference was a breach of the Concordat and that he feared children would be confused as to their "obligation to act with charity to all men" and as to the historical mission of the people of Israel. Often Galen directly protested to Hitler over violations of the Concordat. When in 1936, Nazis removed crucifixes in school, protest by Galen led to public demonstration. Hitler sometimes allowed pressure to be placed on German parents to remove children from religious classes to be given ideological instruction in its place, while in elite Nazi schools, Christian prayers were replaced with Teutonic rituals and sun-worship.

Church kindergartens were closed, crucifixes were removed from schools and Catholic welfare programs were restricted on the basis they assisted the "racially unfit". Parents were coerced into removing their children from Catholic schools. In Bavaria, teaching positions formerly allotted to nuns were awarded to secular teachers and denominational schools transformed into "Community schools". When in 1937 the authorities in Upper Bavaria attempted to replace Catholic schools with "common schools", Cardinal Faulhaber offered fierce resistance. By 1939 all Catholic denominational schools had been disbanded or converted to public facilities.

=== Suppression of Catholic Trade Unions ===
The Catholic trade unions formed the left wing of the Catholic community in Germany. The Nazis moved quickly to suppress both the "Free" unions (Socialist) and the "Christian unions" (allied with the Catholic Church). In 1933 all unions were liquidated. Catholic union leaders arrested by the regime included Blessed Nikolaus Gross and Jakob Kaiser.

=== Interference in welfare organisations ===
From 1941, expropriation of Church properties surged. The Nazi authorities claimed that the properties were needed for wartime necessities such as hospitals, or accommodation for refugees or children, but in fact used them for their own purposes. Despite Nazi efforts to transfer hospitals to state control, large numbers of handicapped people were still under the care of the Churches when the Nazi commenced their infamous euthanasia program.

While the Nazi Final Solution liquidation of the Jews took place primarily on German-occupied Polish territory, the murder of invalids took place on German soil and involved interference in Catholic (and Protestant) welfare institutions. Awareness of the murderous programme therefore became widespread, and the Church leaders who opposed it (such as the Bishop of Münster, Clemens August von Galen) were therefore able to rouse widespread public opposition.

On 6, 13 and 20 July 1941, Bishop von Galen spoke against the state seizure of properties and the expulsions of nuns, monks, and religious and criticised the euthanasia programme. In an attempt to cow Galen, the police raided his sister's convent, and detained her in the cellar. She escaped the confinement and Galen, who had also received news of the imminent removal of further patients, launched his most audacious challenge on the regime in a 3 August sermon. He declared the murders to be illegal and said that he had formally accused those responsible for murders in his diocese in a letter to the public prosecutor. Galen said that it was the duty of Christians to resist the taking of human life, even if it meant losing their own lives. The regional Nazi leader and Hitler's deputy Martin Bormann called for Galen to be hanged, but Hitler and Goebbels urged a delay in retribution till war's end.

The intervention led to, in the words of Richard J. Evans, "the strongest, most explicit and most widespread protest movement against any policy since the beginning of the Third Reich." Nurses and staff (particularly in Catholics institutions) increasingly sought to obstruct implementation of the policy. Under pressure from growing protests, Hitler halted the main euthanasia program on 24 August 1941, though less systematic murder of the handicapped continued.

=== "War on the Church" ===
By late 1935, Bishop Clemens August von Galen of Münster was urging a joint pastoral letter protesting an "underground war" against the church. By early 1937, the church hierarchy in Germany, which had initially attempted to co-operate, had become highly disillusioned. In March, Pope Pius XI issued the Mit brennender Sorge encyclical—accusing the Nazi Government of violations of the 1933 Concordat, and further that it was sowing the "tares of suspicion, discord, hatred, calumny, of secret and open fundamental hostility to Christ and His Church". The Nazis responded with an intensification of the Church Struggle, beginning around April. Goebbels noted heightened verbal attacks on the clergy from Hitler in his diary and wrote that Hitler had approved the start of "immorality trials" against clergy and anti-Church propaganda campaign. Goebbels' orchestrated attack included a staged "morality trial" of 37 Franciscans.

At the outbreak of World War Two, Goebbels' Ministry of Propaganda applied intense pressure on the Churches to voice support for the war, and the Gestapo banned Church meetings for a few weeks. In the first few months of the war, the German Churches complied. No denunciations of the invasion of Poland, nor the Blitzkrieg were issued. The Catholic bishops asked their followers to support the war effort: "We appeal to the faithful to join in ardent prayer that God's providence may lead this war to blessed success for Fatherland and people." Despite this, the anti-church radical Reinhard Heydrich determined that support from church leaders could not be expected because of the nature of their doctrines and internationalism, and wanted to cripple the political activities of clergy. He devised measures to restrict the operation of the Churches under cover of war time exigencies, such as reducing resources available to Church presses on the basis of rationing, and prohibiting pilgrimages and large church gatherings on the basis of transportation difficulties. Churches were closed for being "too far from bomb shelters". Bells were melted down. Presses were closed.

With the expansion of the war in the East from 1941, there came also an expansion of the regime's attack on the churches. Monasteries and convents were targeted and expropriation of Church properties surged. The Nazi authorities claimed that the properties were needed for wartime necessities such as hospitals, or accommodation for refugees or children, but in fact used them for their own purposes. "Hostility to the state" was another common cause given for the confiscations, and the action of a single member of a monastery could result in seizure of the whole. The Jesuits were especially targeted. The Papal Nuncio Cesare Orsenigo and Cardinal Bertram complained constantly to the authorities but were told to expect more requisitions owing to war-time needs. The Nazi authorities decreed the dissolution of all monasteries and abbeys in the German Reich, many of them effectively being occupied and secularized by the Allgemeine SS under Himmler. However, on 30 July 1941 the Aktion Klostersturm ('Operation Monastery') was put to an end by a decree of Hitler, who feared the increasing protests by the Catholic part of German population might result in passive rebellions and thereby harm the Nazi war effort at the eastern front. Over 300 monasteries and other institutions were expropriated by the SS.

On 22 March 1942, the German Bishops issued a pastoral letter on "The Struggle against Christianity and the Church". The letter launched a defence of human rights and the rule of law and accused the Reich Government of "unjust oppression and hated struggle against Christianity and the Church", despite the loyalty of German Catholics to the Fatherland, and brave service of Catholics soldiers:

For years a war has raged in our Fatherland against Christianity and the Church, and has never been conducted with such bitterness. Repeatedly the German bishops have asked the Reich Government to discontinue this fatal struggle; but unfortunately our appeals and our endeavours were without success.

— 22 March 1942 Pastoral Letter of the German Bishops

The letter outlined serial breaches of the 1933 Concordat, reiterated complaints of the suffocation of Catholic schooling, presses and hospitals and said that the "Catholic faith has been restricted to such a degree that it has disappeared almost entirely from public life" and even worship within churches in Germany "is frequently restricted or oppressed", while in the conquered territories (and even in the Old Reich), churches had been "closed by force and even used for profane purposes". The freedom of speech of clergymen had been suppressed and priests were being "watched constantly" and punished for fulfilling "priestly duties" and incarcerated in Concentration camps without legal process. Religious orders had been expelled from schools, and their properties seized, while seminaries had been confiscated "to deprive the Catholic priesthood of successors". The bishops denounced the Nazi euthanasia program and declared their support for human rights and personal freedom under God and "just laws" of all people:

We demand juridical proof of all sentences and release of all fellow citizens who have been deprived of their liberty without proof ... We the German bishops shall not cease to protest against the killing of innocent persons. Nobody's life is safe unless the Commandment, "Thou shalt not kill" is observed ... We the bishops, in the name of the Catholic people ... demand the return of all unlawfully confiscated and in some cases sequestered property ... for what happens today to church property may tomorrow happen to any lawful property.

— 22 March 1942 Pastoral Letter of the German Bishops

== Priests and deacons at Dachau ==
The regime incarcerated clergy who had opposed the Nazi regime in the Dachau Concentration Camp. In 1935, Wilhelm Braun, a Catholic priest from Frankfurt an der Oder, became the first clergyman imprisoned at Dachau. From December 1940, Berlin ordered the transfer of clerical prisoners held at other camps, and Dachau became the centre for imprisonment of clergymen. Of a total of 2,720 clerics recorded as imprisoned at Dachau some 2,579 (or 94.88%) were Roman Catholics. 1,034 Catholic priests died there. The remaining 1,545 priests were liberated by the allies on April 29, 1945.

Among the Catholic clergy who died at Dachau were many of the 108 Polish Martyrs of World War II. Blessed Gerhard Hirschfelder died of hunger and illness in 1942. Saint Titus Brandsma, a Dutch Carmelite, died of a lethal injection in 1942. Blessed Alojs Andritzki, a German priest, was given a lethal injection in 1943. Blessed Engelmar Unzeitig, a Czech priest, died of typhoid in 1945. Blessed Giuseppe Girotti died at the camp in April 1945.

Amid the Nazi persecution of the Tirolian Catholics, Blessed Otto Neururer, a parish priest, was sent to Dachau for "slander to the detriment of German marriage", after he advised a girl against marrying the friend of a senior Nazi. He was executed at Buchenwald concentration camp in 1940 for conducting a baptism there. Neururer was the first priest killed in the concentration camps.

Blessed Bernhard Lichtenberg died during transport to Dachau in 1943. In December 1944, Blessed Karl Leisner, a deacon from Munster who was dying of tuberculosis, was ordained at Dachau. His fellow prisoner Gabriel Piguet, the Bishop of Clermont-Ferrand, presided the secret ceremony. Leisner died soon after the liberation of the camp.

== Annexed regions ==
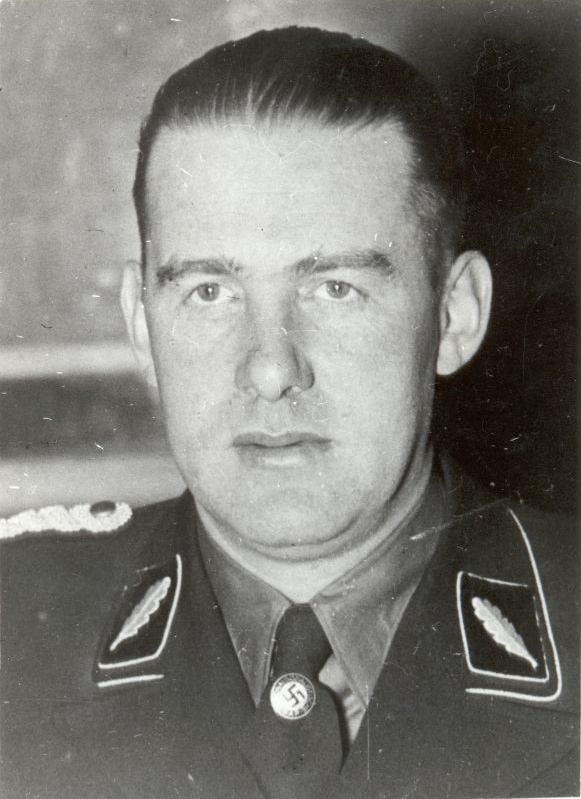
The Nazi Gauleiter of Vienna, Odilo Globocnik, who launched a crusade against the Church

=== Austria ===
Austria, annexed by Germany in early 1938, was overwhelmingly Catholic. At the direction of Cardinal Innitzer, the churches of Vienna pealed their bells and flew swastikas for Hitler's arrival in the city on 14 March. However, wrote Mark Mazower, such gestures of accommodation were "not enough to assuage the Austrian Nazi radicals, foremost among them the young Gauleiter Globocnik".

Globocnik launched a crusade against the Church, and the Nazis confiscated property, closed Catholic organisations and sent many priests to Dachau. The martyred Austrian priests Jakob Gapp and Otto Neururer were beatified in 1996. Neururer was tortured and hanged at Buchenwald and Jakob Gapp was guillotined in Berlin. Anger at the treatment of the Church in Austria grew quickly and October 1938, wrote Mazower, saw the "very first act of overt mass resistance to the new regime", when a rally of thousands left Mass in Vienna chanting "Christ is our Führer", before being dispersed by police.

A Nazi mob ransacked Cardinal Innitzer's residence, after he had denounced Nazi persecution of the Church. L'Osservatore Romano reported on 15 October that Hitler Youth and the SA had gathered at St. Stephen's Cathedral during a service for Catholic Youth and started "counter-shouts and whistlings: 'Down with Innitzer! Our faith is Germany'". The following day, the mob stoned the Cardinal's residence, broke in and ransacked it—beating a secretary unconscious, and storming another house of the cathedral curia and throwing its curate out of the window. The American National Catholic Welfare Conference wrote that Pope Pius, "again protested against the violence of the Nazis, in language recalling Nero and Judas the Betrayer, comparing Hitler with Julian the Apostate."

=== Czech lands ===
Following its October 1938 annexation, Nazi policy in the Sudetenland saw ethnic Czech priests expelled, or deprived of income and forced to do labour, while their properties were seized. Religious orders were suppressed, private schools closed and religious instruction forbidden in schools. Shortly before World War II, Czechoslovakia ceased to exist, swallowed by Nazi expansion. Its territory was divided into the mainly Czech Protectorate of Bohemia and Moravia, and the newly declared Slovak Republic, while a considerable part of Czechoslovakia was directly annexed by Nazi Germany. 122 Czechoslovak Catholic priests were sent to Dachau Concentration Camp. 76 did not survive the ordeal.

=== Poland ===
Nazi policy towards the Church was at its most severe in the territories it annexed to Greater Germany, where they set about systematically dismantling the Church—arresting its leaders, exiling its clergymen, closing its churches, monasteries and convents. Many clergymen were murdered. Altogether some 1700 Polish priests ended up at Dachau: half of them did not survive their imprisonment." Kerhsaw wrote that, in Hitler's scheme for the Germanization of Eastern Europe, there would be no place for the Christian Churches".

=== Slovenia ===
The Nazi persecution of the Church in annexed Slovenia was akin to that which occurred in Poland. Within six weeks of the Nazi occupation, only 100 of the 831 priests in the Diocese of Maribor and part of the Diocese of Ljubljana remained free. Clergy were persecuted and sent to concentration camps, religious Orders had their properties seized, some youth were sterilized. The first priest to die was Aloysius Zuzek.

== Long term plans ==
Documents used in evidence at the Nuremberg Trials concluded that the Nazis planned to de-Christianise Germany. A report entitled "The Nazi Master Plan; The Persecution of Christian Churches" prepared by the Office of Strategic Services (forerunner to the American CIA) says: "Important leaders of the National Socialist party would have liked... complete extirpation of Christianity and the substitution of a purely racial religion." The report stated that the best evidence for the existence of an anti-Church plan was to be found in the systematic nature of the persecution of Germany's churches.

In January 1934, Hitler had appointed Alfred Rosenberg as the cultural and educational leader of the Reich. Rosenberg was a neo-pagan and notoriously anti-Catholic. In 1934, the Sanctum Officium in Rome recommended that Rosenberg's book be put on the Index Librorum Prohibitorum (forbidden books list of the Catholic Church) for scorning and rejecting "all dogmas of the Catholic Church, indeed the very fundamentals of the Christian religion".

== Aftermath ==
Several dioceses were freed in April 1945, which finally allowed the bishops to attend a synod in Fulda after an involuntary, extended break.

== See also ==
- Catholic Church and Nazi Germany
- German Evangelical Church
- Pope Pius XII
- Catholic resistance to Nazi Germany
- Religion in Nazi Germany

== Sources ==
- Evans, Richard J. (2009). The Third Reich at War. New York City: Penguin Press.
- Shirer, William Lawrence (1960), The Rise and Fall of the Third Reich: A History of Nazi Germany, London: Secker & Warburg, Wikidata Q138049061
