= Cologne Circle =

Resistance group in Nazi Germany

Cologne Resistance Circle
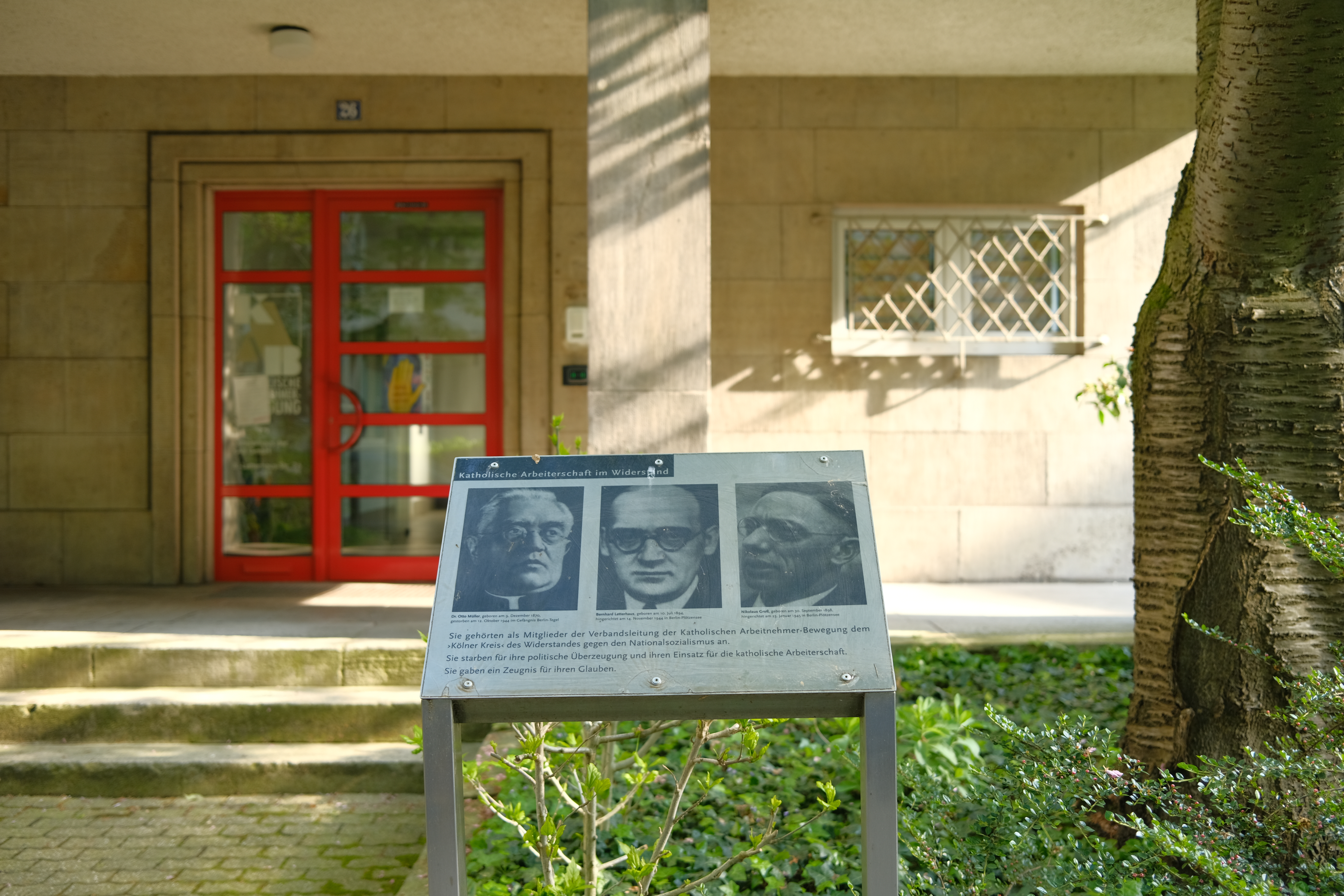
- Memorial plaque to the Cologne Circle in front of the Ketteler House
- Founded: 1941
- Defunct: 1944

The Cologne Circle (German: Kölner Kreis also known as Kölner Widerstandskreis) was a German resistance group founded during World War II against National Socialism, composed of people from the Catholic political milieu. The members of this discussion group met at the Catholic Ketteler House in Cologne's Agnesviertel.

== Origins and members of the Circle ==
The Cologne Resistance Circle was a network of Catholics in the Rhineland and Westphalia. Its members initially opposed National Socialism primarily for religious reasons. This evolved over a lengthy process into a decision for political resistance. The originally purely Catholic discussion groups originated from the milieu of Catholic associations, Christian trade unions, and the Center Party in Cologne. Gradually, connections developed with other opposition circles in cities such as Düsseldorf, Bonn, Bochum, and Duisburg. With the Catholic Workers' Movement (KAB) and its Cologne headquarters in the Kettelerhaus, the group had an organizational framework, as the KAB local branches formed a network of trusted contacts. The leadership of the West German Association of Catholic Workers (Chairman Otto Müller, Association Secretary Bernhard Letterhaus, and Editor-in-Chief Nikolaus Groß) were murdered during the Third Reich. Chairman Joseph Joos escaped the same fate only because he had been imprisoned in the Dachau concentration camp since 1940. The leading figures of the group included Jakob Kaiser, Wilhelm Elfes, the former editor-in-chief of the Westdeutsche Arbeiterzeitung and Krefeld police chief, Andreas Hermes, the former Reich Minister of Agriculture of the Center Party, as well as Johannes Albers, Johannes Gronowski, Paul Franken, Christine Teusch, Heinrich Körner and the Dominicans Laurentius Siemer and Eberhard Welty.

== Contacts with the supra-regional resistance ==
The group did not remain isolated, but also established contacts with individuals and networks outside the Catholic milieu. For example, the Düsseldorf group included not only Karl Arnold, the former antitrust secretary of the Christian Trade Unions and later Minister-President of North Rhine-Westphalia, but also Robert Lehr, the former German nationalist (DNVP), Protestant mayor of Düsseldorf.

This collaboration also extended beyond the region, including with the Kreisau Circle. Contact persons included Helmuth James Graf von Moltke and the former mayor of Leipzig, Carl Friedrich Goerdeler. Connections also existed with General von Hammerstein, an opposition military figure associated with Colonel General Ludwig Beck, the long-time head of the military resistance. In 1941, Beck had a direct encounter with Chairman Otto Müller. Müller apparently reported this when he mentioned the visit of a "very high-ranking military official" in 1943, who had inquired about the organizational status and Nazi immunity of the KAB members.

The Cologne branch of the Ketteler House circle, in particular, also had contacts with Social Democrats: the former Social Democratic mayor of Solingen, Josef Brisch, established connections with the former Prussian Minister of the Interior, Carl Severing, and the independent trade unionist, Wilhelm Leuschner.

This established ties to the core of both the military and civilian resistance against National Socialism. Since the Berlin resistance group had few connections to West Germany, the Cologne Circle, to which Nikolaus Gross belonged, became something of a western foothold.

== Resistance in the Archdiocese of Cologne ==
There was no organized resistance against National Socialism authorized by the Catholic Church in the Archdiocese of Cologne. The Cologne Circle was the only truly organized resistance by Catholics against the dictatorship, although the Catholic Church was massively hindered in its work by the Nazi government. For example, the Cologne diocesan priest Franz Boehm was hindered in his pastoral work for Polish forced laborers. An official condemnation of the persecution of Jews was not issued until Archbishop Josef Frings delivered a sermon on March 12, 1944. Although this criticism of the Nazi regime occurred before the assassination attempt on 20 July, 1944, many Catholics suffered under the Nazi tyranny. The sermons of numerous pastors, such as the Cologne diocesan priest Johannes Flintrop, were monitored by the Gestapo. Many Catholics who had expressed criticism of National Socialism before Adolf Hitler's rise to power were subjected to numerous acts of repression during the dictatorship. The situation became particularly dramatic after the outbreak of World War II. For example, as part of such reprisal measures, the Catholic social scientist at the University of Cologne, Benedikt Schmittmann, was sent to the Sachsenhausen concentration camp on September 9, 1939, where he was beaten to death on September 13. Other victims from the social sector of the Catholic Church are primarily found in the Kolping Society. The management of the Cologne office was arrested as part of the so-called "Aktion Gitter" following the failed Stauffenberg assassination attempt on Adolf Hitler. Chairman Heinrich Richter and managing director Theodor Babilon were murdered in the Buchenwald concentration camp, where their bodies were doused with gasoline and burned.

== Persecution after the 20 July plot ==
As a reservoir of personnel in the West, the Cologne Circle, with its ideas and people, played an important role in the resistance against Hitler. It had extensive ties to the most prominent resistance circles in Kreisau and Berlin. It is therefore not surprising that its leading figures – Letterhaus, Groß and Müller – were swept into the maelstrom of Nazi revenge justice after the failed 20 July plot. Groß and Letterhaus were sentenced to death and executed by the Volksgerichtshof, while Otto Müller died in prison. Groß's trial revealed the Nazi rulers' far-reaching anti-Catholicism intentions. Although he was convicted of participating in Goerdeler's conspiracy, he was tried alongside the Kreisau members. However, his relationship with Kreisau, which had existed through Alfred Delp, was not mentioned at all during the trial. The background was that the Nazi judiciary under Roland Freisler was planning a trial against the Catholic Church with Delp and Otto Müller, in which his mediating role between the circles could have played an important role. The plan failed, however, due to Müller's premature death.

Arrest warrants were issued against other members of the Cologne Circle. The Dominican Laurentius Siemer survived the persecution in a hiding place where he remained until the end of the war. Jakob Kaiser was also wanted by the Gestapo. However, he was able to go into hiding with the help of his future wife and political companion, Elfriede Nebgen. Trade unionist Heinrich Körner was arrested on September 1, 1944, and questioned about his contacts with Kaiser, but was soon released. On November 25, Heinrich Körner was arrested again and taken to Lehrter Strasse prison in Berlin two weeks later. On April 6, 1945, the People's Court sentenced him to four years in prison. After the attempted coup, Andreas Hermes was arrested and sentenced to death by the People's Court on January 11, 1945. Due to fortunate circumstances, he was able to survive.

== Planning for post-war Germany ==
The Cologne Circle, like the Kreisau and Berlin Circles around Goerdeler, thought about the future structure of the German state after the end of the war. However, he is at a fundamental disadvantage in today's reception compared to the other two, because his works, which were summarized by Nikolaus Groß and Wilhelm Elfes under the titles Ist Deutschland verloren? (Is Germany Lost?) and Die großen Aufgaben (The Great Tasks), no longer exist. Thus, only texts by individual members such as Wilhelm Elfes and Eberhard Welty remain, although these do not necessarily reflect the views of the entire Cologne Circle. Nevertheless, basic outlines of the Cologne ideas can be reconstructed. What is striking about them, especially in comparison with Kreisau and Goerdeler's plans, is that the Cologne Circle took democracy of some kind for granted.

Parties and their dominant role in forming governments were a given for the people of Cologne. There was unanimity about not wanting to revive the Catholic Center Party in its former form in the future. Two party models competed with each other: a party of workers modelled on the British Labour Party with the aim of bridging the gap between Christian and socialist workers, on the one hand, and a Christian, interdenominational Volkspartei (people's party), similar to what became reality in the CDU in 1945, on the other.

Within the circle, there was also intensive discussion with other Catholic personalities, such as the Dominican Provincial Laurentius Siemer, about a possible future shape of Germany on the basis of Catholic social teaching. On this occasion, Siemer relied on the writings and elaborations of his fellow brother Eberhard Welty. In his teaching, Welty did not abandon the foundations of traditional social philosophy following Thomas Aquinas. For his social demands, he emphasized a form of natural law that differed from Marxism and all forms of liberalism.

== See also ==
- Nazi persecution of the Catholic Church in Germany
- Catholic Church and Nazi Germany during World War II
- Catholic Church and Nazi Germany
- Catholic resistance to Nazi Germany
- German Resistance Memorial Center
- Historiography of German resistance to Nazism
- Operation Valkyrie
