= Eberhard Welty =

German Dominican and social ethicist (1902–1965)

Ordo Praedicatorum OP Eberhard Welty
- Born: 15 September 1902; Anholt, German Empire
- Died: 2 June 1965 (aged 62); Freiburg i. Br., West Germany
- Education: University of Cologne
- Occupations: Theologian, Philosopher, Sociologist, Economist, Catholic priest, Ethicist
- Movement: Cologne Circle
- Religion: Christianity
- Writings: A Handbook of Christian Social Ethics

Eberhard Welty OP (born Franz Matthias Bernhard Welty; 15 September 1902 –2 June 1965) was a German Dominican priest and social ethicist. During the Nazi period he became a significant figure in Catholic resistance to Nazism and was a spiritual leader of the German Resistance movement Cologne Circle.

== Biography ==
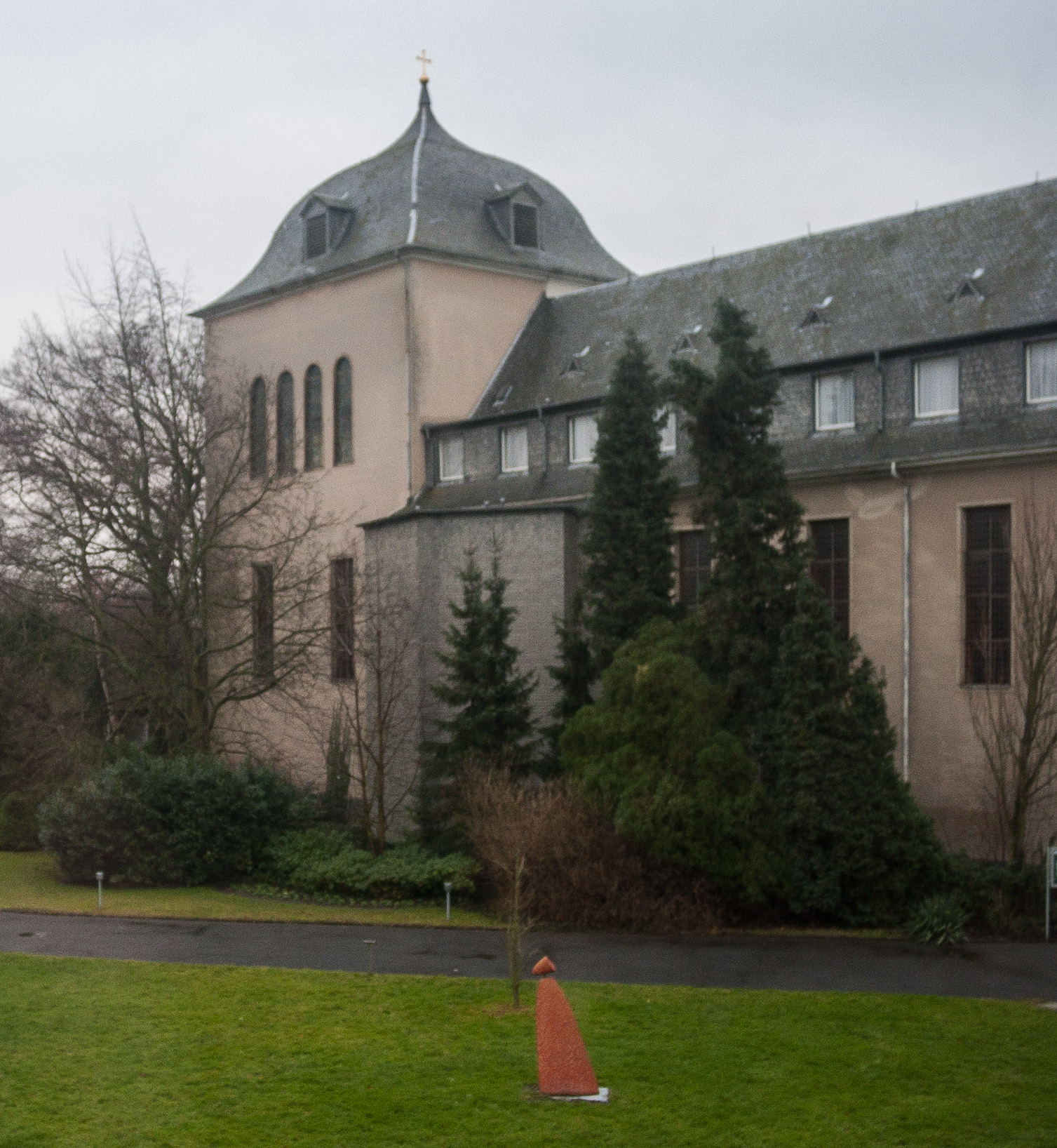
Convent in Walberberg

=== Early life and education ===
Welty came from modest middle-class circumstances. His father was a master tailor in Anholt, Westphalia. He was born there on September 15, 1902, the eldest of eleven children. After attending the Rektoratsschule, he went to the Dominican College of St. Thomas in Vechta, but after three years transferred to the Gymnasium in Emmerich, where he graduated in 1922. He then entered the Dominican Order. Welty studied theology and philosophy at the order's own seminary, first in Düsseldorf and then in Walberberg. Immediately after passing his lectureship examination (1930), he became a docent in ethics and moral theology there. In addition to his teaching position at the Dominican monastery of St. Albert, he studied economics and sociology at the University of Cologne, where he received his doctorate in 1935. At the University of Cologne, his thinking was shaped by the great sociologist Leopold von Wiese (relationship theory), the economist Christian Eckert, and above all by Theodor Brauer, the Catholic social ethicist who had been head of the education department of the Christian trade unions for many years and then headed the Cologne Research Institute for Social Sciences.

=== Resistance to National Socialism ===
In 1941, Welty joined the resistance group Kölner Kreis and developed the basic principles of a future Christian-constitutional social order. The Jesuit Alfred Delp, as the most important liaison between the Kreisau Circle and the Catholic Church, and the Dominican Father Eberhard Welty, as the intellectual leader of the Cologne resistance circle, met repeatedly during the war. However, the ideological positions of the Jesuit from Kreisau and the Dominican from Cologne proved impossible to reconcile. Even though Delp calls his new order personal socialism and Welty his Christian socialism, they are not the same variant of non-Marxist socialism. For Welty, Delp's advocacy of "existential humanism" already represented a relapse into liberal modes of thought. Where Welty claims the role of a kind of chief arbiter for the church within the new order, Delp seeks to reduce the church's secular power. Where Welty was concerned with firm leadership by the church, Delp strove for education towards autonomy, personal responsibility, ability to judgement, and capacity for conscience. Welty's orientation towards Thomas Aquinas and neo-scholasticism, which prioritized holism and community over the individual, met with rejection not only from Delp, but also from other members of the resistance circles against National Socialism. Unlike Delp, who was executed on February 2, 1945, following a verdict by the Volksgerichtshof, Welty remained unmolested after the assassination attempt of July 20, 1944, as he had only personally attended one meeting of the resistance circle at the Kettlerhaus in Cologne.

=== Post-World War II era ===
In the spring of 1945, Welty published his pamphlet Was nun? (What Now?), which found a very wide readership in devastated Germany. His ideas for the reorganization of Germany were so well received that they were included in the first party programs of the newly founded Christian Democratic Union of Germany (CDU). Many conferences took place during this time at the Dominican convent in Walberberg. However, the concept of “Christian Socialism” attributed to Welty ultimately did not prevail. An expanded book version of "What now?" was published in 1946 under the title Entscheidung in die Zukunft (Decision into the future). In the same year, Welty founded the magazine Die Neue Ordnung (The New Order) together with Laurentius Siemer. In 1951 he founded the Institut für Gesellschaftswissenschaften Walberberg. Welty was an advisor to many politicians in the Federal Republic of Germany, including many members of the Social Democratic Party of Germany (SPD). The most comprehensive "Workbook of Catholic Social Ethics" to date, which achieved high print runs and was translated into six languages, remained unfinished. Welty died of heart failure on June 2, 1965, in the midst of working on the fourth volume, which dealt with the economic order.

== Writings ==
- Man in society. A Handbook of Christian Social Ethics (Volume 1), Herder and Herder, New York 1960.
- The Structure of the social order. A Handbook of Christian Social Ethics (Volume 2), Herder and Herder, New York 1963.
- Die Entscheidung in die Zukunft. Grundsätze und Hinweise zur Neuordnung im deutschen Lebensraum (German). Balduin Pick, Cologne 1946.
- Herders Sozialkatechismus. Ein Werkbuch der katholischen Sozialethik in Frage und Antwort (German), edited by Eberhard Welty. Herder, Freiburg 1952.
- Catecismo social (Spanish), Herder, Barcelona 1956.
- Catecismo social: A constitução da ordem social (Portuguese), Astor, Lisbon 1960.
- La encíclica social del Papa Juan XXIII, Mater et magistra (Spanish), Herder, Barcelona 1963.

== See also ==
- Catholic resistance to Nazi Germany
- Catholic Church and Nazi Germany
- Cologne Resistance Circle
- Catholic social teaching
- Social teachings of the papacy
- Mater et magistra
