= Courneya =

Courneya is an uncommon last name. It is a variant of the French Cornoyer, which is possibly an altered spelling of Corneyre, a ‘learned’ form of Cornier, which was a name for someone who lived on the corner of a street. Secondly, it may be a French form of the German Koerner.

In 1891, there were 3 families in England and Wales with this surname, 67% of these living in Yorkshire area, and almost 1/3 in the London region. The name was first seen in the US in similar numbers in 1920, with 19 families. Michigan (32%) and Rhode Island (26%) had the majority of these families. The rest were in Texas, Wisconsin, Minnesota, Montana, and New Jersey. Notable people with the surname include:

- Kerry Courneya (born 1963), Canadian kinesiologist
- Marsha Courneya, Canadian screenwriter
