= Heinrich Körner (trade unionist) =

German Catholic trade unionist and member of the resistance to Nazism (1892–1945)

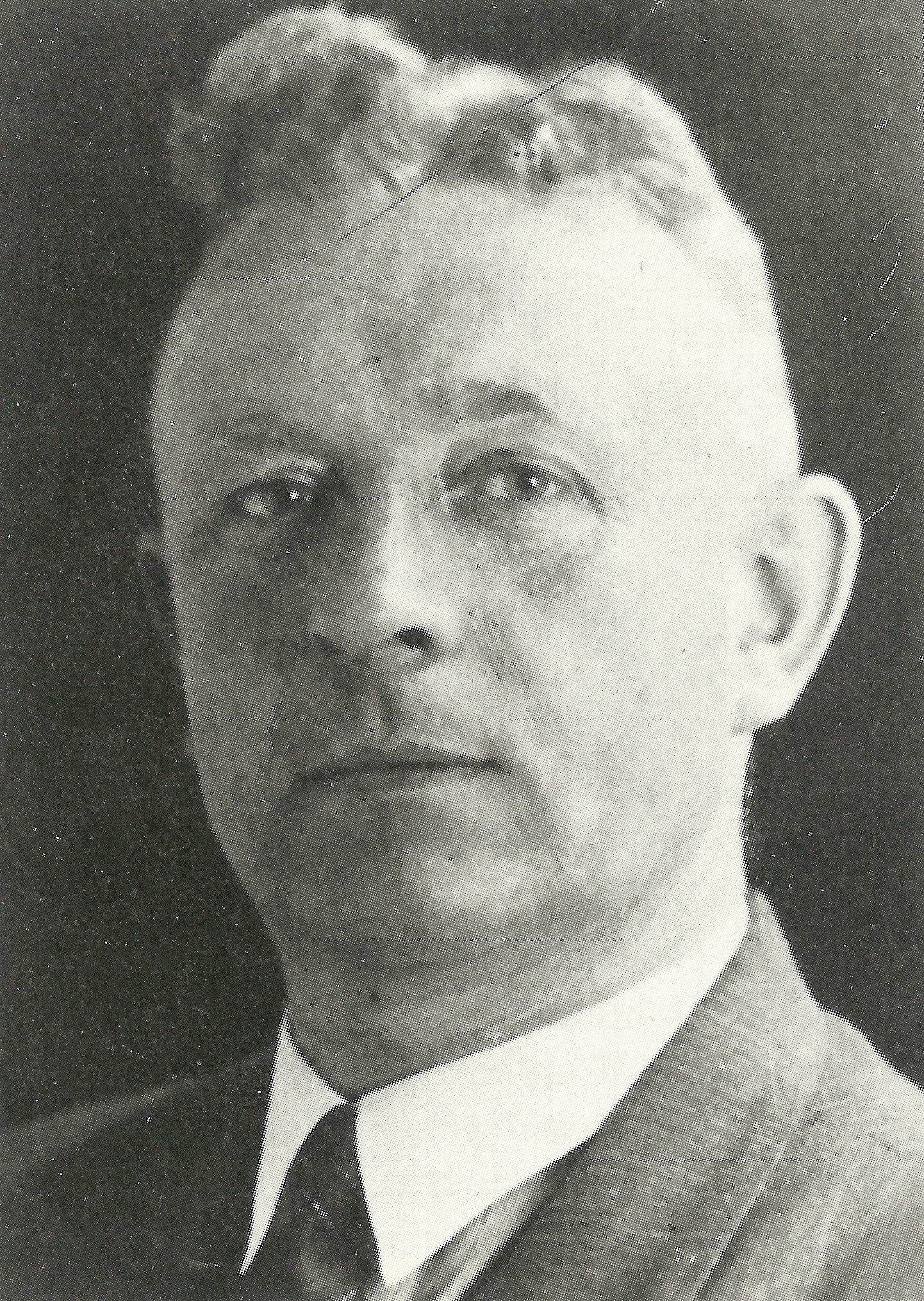
- Born: 30 April 1892; Essen, German Empire
- Died: 25 April 1945 (aged 52); Plötzensee Prison, Berlin, Nazi Germany
- Cause of death: Shot in obscure circumstances
- Occupations: Toolmaker, trade unionist
- Political party: Centre Party (Germany)
- Spouse: Maria Theresia Dierichsweiler

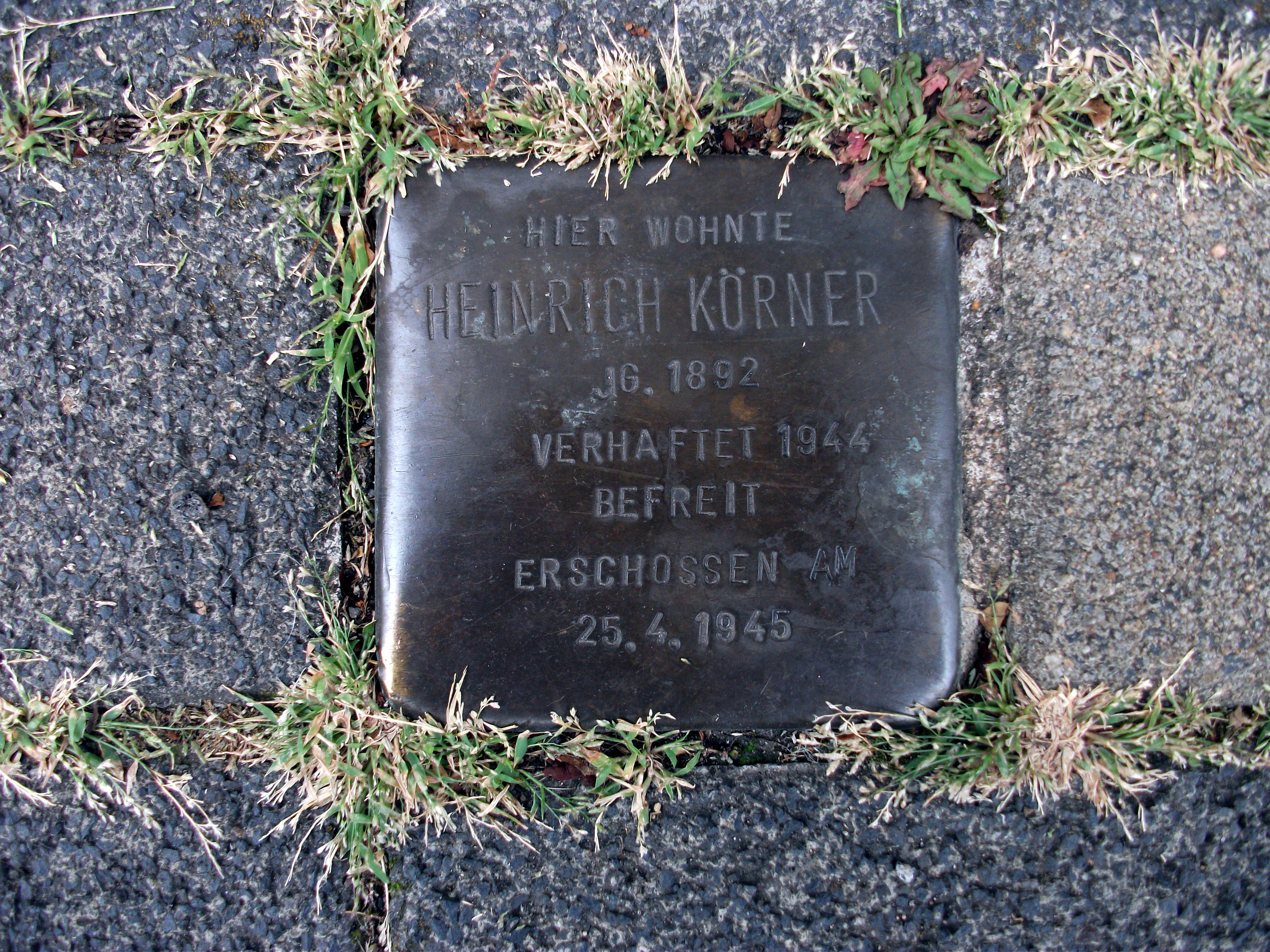
Stolperstein for Heinrich Körner in Bonn

Heinrich Körner (30 April 1892 in Essen – 25 or 26 April 1945 in Berlin) was a German Catholic trade unionist and resistance fighter against Adolf Hitler's Nazi regime. Convicted for his involvement in the July Plot, Körner died during the Soviet liberation of Plötzensee Prison.

== Biography ==
=== Background ===
The eldest of four children, Heinrich Körner was born in 1892 in Essen, which at that time still belonged to the Archdiocese of Cologne. The son of a Krupp worker, he became a toolmaker and found his spiritual home in the Kolpinghaus in Essen. At the same time, he trained in the Volksverein für das katholische Deutschland and in the Windthorstbund, the youth association of the German Center Party. In 1911, he joined the United Federation of Christian Trade Unions in Germany. In 1913 he volunteered for the navy. At the beginning of the First World War, he was in Tsingtao and was taken prisoner of war by the Imperial Japanese Army there in November 1914. After returning from a prisoner-of-war camp in 1920, he worked as a toolmaker at Krupp. In 1923, he took a full-time position as a cartel secretary for the Christian trade unions in Bonn. Because he held a trade union meeting during the "passive resistance" against the occupation of the Ruhr, which had been banned by the occupying powers, he was sentenced to six months in prison. In Bonn, he married Therese Dierichsweiler (Therese Körner) in 1924, with whom he had three daughters. As managing director of the umbrella organization of Christian trade unions in Cologne since 1926, he began a close collaboration with Jakob Kaiser, the state managing director of the Christian trade unions. In addition to his main task of training Christian workers, Körner was politically active in the German Center Party and was elected to the state parliament of the Rhine Province.

=== Resistance to National Socialism ===
After the National Socialists seized power in January 1933, Körner was imprisoned for a week in May of the same year. A month later, the Christian trade unions were finally dissolved. Körner then moved to Bonn, where he hoped to secure his family's livelihood with a large garden. At the same time, he built up a circle of opposition members in Bonn, who in turn maintained contacts with like-minded individuals throughout Germany. He worked together with Jakob Kaiser, who joined the Berlin resistance around the former German national mayor of Leipzig Carl Goerdeler (DNVP). At such opposition meetings in Körner's house, the opportunity developed to bring the Catholic workers' opposition into contact with the military opposition around the pro-worker General von Hammerstein. He also joined the Cologne Circle and soon belonged to the inner circle. In 1941, together with Nikolaus Groß, he sought out the provincial superior of the Dominican monastery of St. Albert in Walberberg, Laurentius Siemer, to win him over as socio-ethical advisor for the economic and socio-political future concepts of the Cologne district. At the meetings in the Kettelerhaus, Siemer was impressed by the competence of the workers' representatives.

=== Imprisonment and sentencing ===
Following the failed assassination attempt on Adolf Hitler on July 20, 1944, Körner was arrested on early September and interrogated about his contacts with Jakob Kaiser, but was soon released. On 25 November, he was arrested again and two weeks later transferred to Zellengefängnis Lehrter Straße in Berlin. On April 6, 1945, the Volksgerichtshof sentenced him to four years in prison. He was then transferred to Plötzensee Prison, where he was shot under unclear circumstances on 25 or 26 April 1945.

=== Death by shooting ===
The prison where Körner was held was liberated by the advancing Soviet Red Army on April 25, 1945. The German Resistance Memorial Center maintains that the circumstances of Körner's death remain unclear. Historian Vera Bücker, however, reports that shootings allegedly took place between the Russians and SS members in the vicinity of the prison. According to her, SS members fired on anything leaving the prison. An SS bullet is said to have struck Körner.

== Legacy ==
- The Catholic Church included Heinrich Körner in the German Martyrology of the 20th Century in 1999.
- A street in the Reuter housing estate in Bonn has been named after Körner since 1949.
- Since 2004, a Stolperstein in front of his former residence in Bonn has commemorated him.
