= Welty =

Welty is a surname of Swiss-German origin. Notable people with the surname include:

- Benjamin F. Welty (1870–1962), American politician from Ohio; U.S. representative 1917–21
- Chris Welty (contemporary), American computer scientist
- Eberhard Welty (1902–1965), German Dominican and social ethicist
- Eudora Welty (1909–2001), American author and photographer
- Harry Welty (contemporary), American school board chairman in Duluth, Minnesota
- John Welty (contemporary), American college administrator; president of California State University at Fresno 1991–2013
- Rachel Perry Welty (born 1962), American photographer
- Ron Welty (born 1971), American punk-rock drummer
