= Heinrich Körner =

Heinrich Körner or Koerner may refer to:

- Heinrich Körner (Geograph) (1755–1822), Swiss geographer and teacher
- Heinrich Körner (trade unionist) (1892–1945), German trade unionist and resistance fighter
- Heinrich Körner (football player) (1893–1961), Austrian football player and football coach
- Heinrich Körner (1908–1993), German sculptor and medalist

== See also ==
- Wilhelm Heinrich Detlev Körner (1878–1938), American illustrator and painter
