= Bernhard Letterhaus =

German Catholic trade unionist and member of the resistance to Nazism (1894–1944)

Bernhard Letterhaus at the People's Court

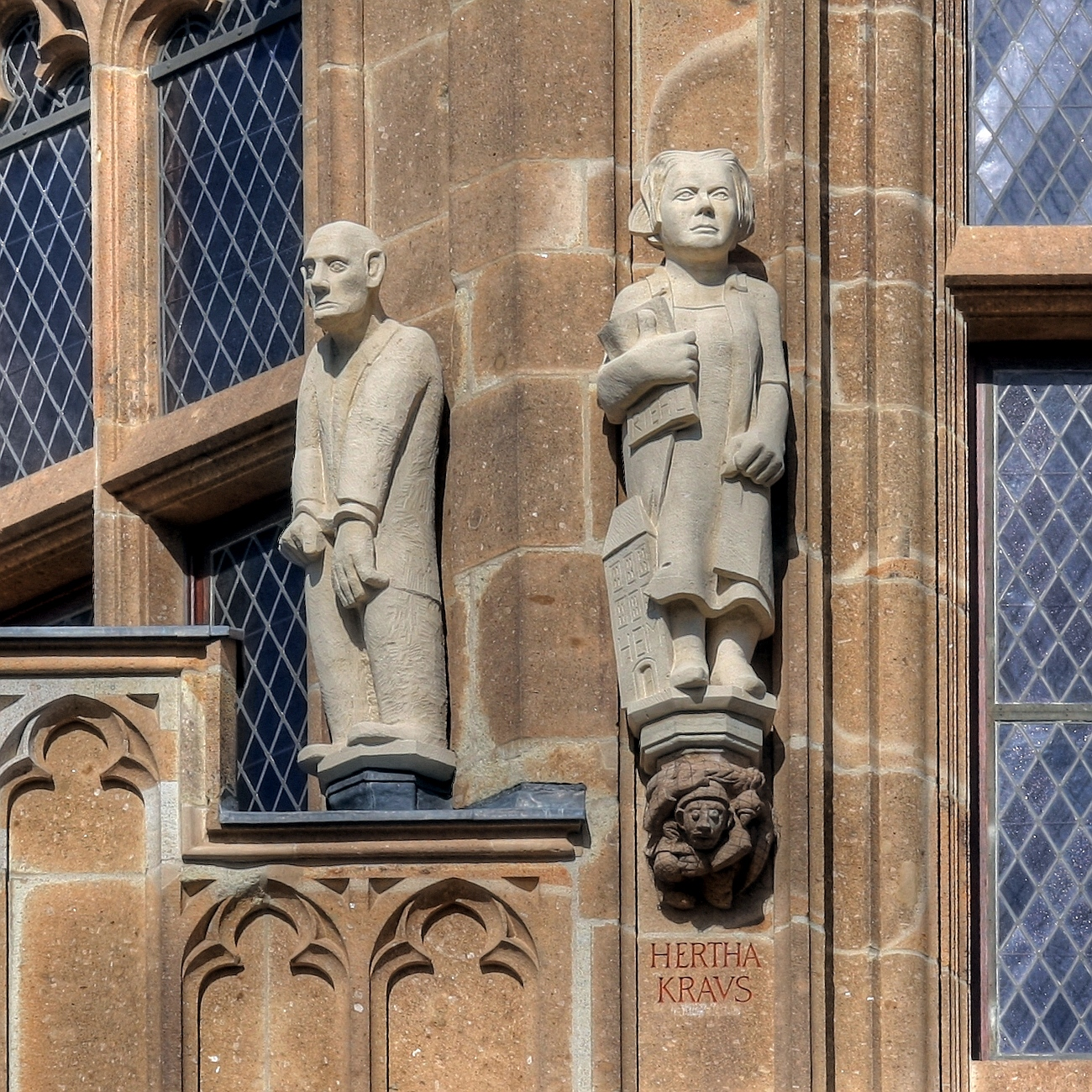
Left: Statue of Bernhard Letterhaus at the city hall tower of Cologne

Bernhard Letterhaus (10 July 1894 – 14 November 1944) was a German Catholic trade unionist and member of the resistance to Nazism.

Letterhaus was born in Barmen, grew up there and in Wuppertal, completed an apprenticeship in a textile factory, attended the Higher Technical College for Textile Design and became an active member of the Katholische Arbeitervereine (Catholic Workers Movement, KAB). He served in the Imperial German Army throughout World War I and was then employed by the Association of Christian Textile Workers in 1921. In 1927, he became the secretary at the KAB headquarters in Mönchengladbach. Letterhaus was elected to the Landtag of Prussia as a representative of the Centre Party at the 1928 Prussian state election, and remained a deputy in the state parliament until its abolition in 1933. In 1928, he moved to Cologne where he was in contact with Nikolaus Gross, a fellow Catholic opponent of the Nazis. Together they founded the Cologne Circle, which was connected to resistance groups in Berlin through Letterhaus. In 1930, he became vice president of the 69th Catholic Congress in Münster.

Letterhaus was conscripted into the Wehrmacht upon the outbreak of World War II in 1939. Upon posting to the OKW in Berlin, he developed contacts with the 20 July plot conspirators including Carl Goerdeler's group. If the attempt to assassinate Adolf Hitler had succeeded, he was earmarked to be the Reconstruction Minister. He was arrested in the aftermath of the failed plot, tried by the People's Court, sentenced to death by Roland Freisler on 13 November 1944 and executed at Plötzensee Prison the next day.

A street in the Hardtberg district of Bonn is named after him. The Bernhard Letterhaus Catholic Youth Residence in Cologne is also named after him.
