= Elfriede Kaiser-Nebgen =

Elfriede Kaiser-Nebgen

Elfriede Kaiser-Nebgen (11 April 1890 – 22 October 1983) was a German social scientist and labor activist who was active in the country's Christian trade unions (CTU) and similar organizations. She took part in the German resistance to Nazism before and during World War II.

== Biography ==
Elfriede Nebgen was born in Hildesheim, Germany, and was initially educated there and in Lausanne, Switzerland. She trained to be a teacher at a school run by the Ursulines in Duderstadt. Her first teaching job was at a school for Polish girls in Poznań. During World War I, she undertook social work in Strasbourg and Metz.

She became interested in trade union work after meeting Adam Stegerwald, then the secretary-general of the League of Christian Unions (LCU). She began a course of study in economics at the Westphalian Wilhelms-University in Münster, graduating in 1921 with a dissertation on the synthesis of socialism and Catholicism.

That fall, Nebgen moved to Berlin and took up a job with the CTU. She worked on education-related projects and wrote for the Central Journal of the Christian Trade Unions of Germany and for the magazine German Labor. Between 1921 and 1923, she helped lay the foundations for a Christian national workers' movement, among other things founding and directing the Central Welfare Committee of the Christian Workers Movement (later known as Christian Workers Help).

In this period, she developed a close, lifelong partnership with labor activist Jakob Kaiser (1888–1961), who was then the national manager of the CTU of West Germany. Together, they campaigned against threats to trade unions posed by right-wing parties in the 1930s. Even before Adolf Hitler abolished all trade unions when the Nazis came to power in 1933, they distanced themselves from organizations that came to terms with the new regime. During World War II, she and Kaiser went into the resistance and made contact with various resistance groups, especially the circle centered in Cologne and associated with Carl Goerdeler, the former mayor of Leipzig. This put Kaiser in touch with Claus von Stauffenberg, a leader of the 20 July plot in 1944 to assassinate Hitler. Although Kaiser was not involved in the plot, his foreknowledge put him at risk, and Nebgen and some companions saved Kaiser's life by hiding him.

After the war, Nebgen initially remained in the Soviet zone of occupation and worked with Kaiser on building the Free German Trade Union Federation (FDGB) and the Christian Democratic Union (CDU). Their moderate leftist views often put them at cross-purposes with Soviet leaders, and in the late 1940s both of them left the Soviet zone. Subsequently, she supported Kaiser in his political career in West Germany and was active in the Christian Democratic Employees' Association, an arm of the CDU.

Nebgen married Kaiser in 1953, after the death of his first wife; thereafter, she hyphenated her last name with his. In 1967 she published a biography of her husband, Jakob Kaiser: Der Widerstandskämpfer (Jakob Kaiser: Resistance Fighter). She survived him by two decades, dying in 1983 in Berlin.
