= Exil-CDU =

Christian Democratic Union in Exile Exil-CDU
- Leader: Jakob Kaiser (1950-1961); Ernst Lemmer (1961-1970); Johann Baptist Gradl (1970-1987); Siegfried Dübel (1987-1991)
- Founded: 1950
- Dissolved: 1991
- Split from: CDU East Germany
- Merged into: Christian Democratic Union of Germany
- Ideology: Christian democracy Conservatism; Anti-communism
- Political position: Center-right

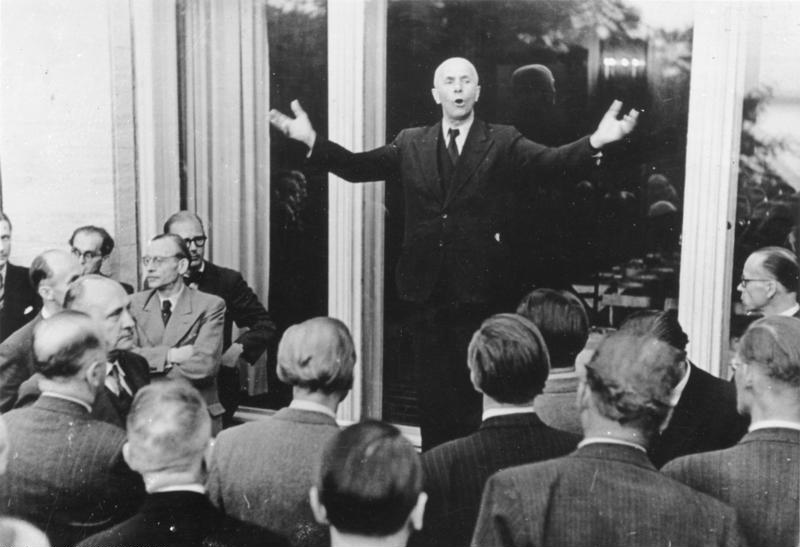
Speech by Jakob Kaiser on September 6, 1947, in Berlin

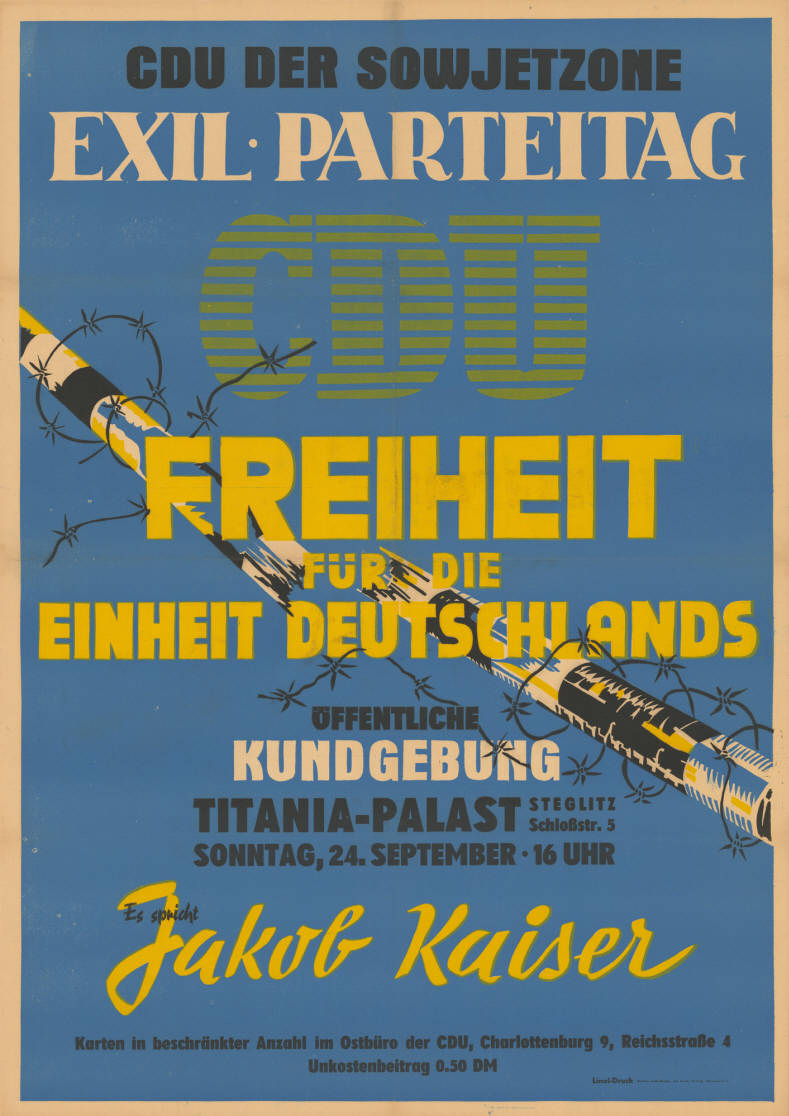
The 1st congress of the Exil-CDU in West Berlin in 1950

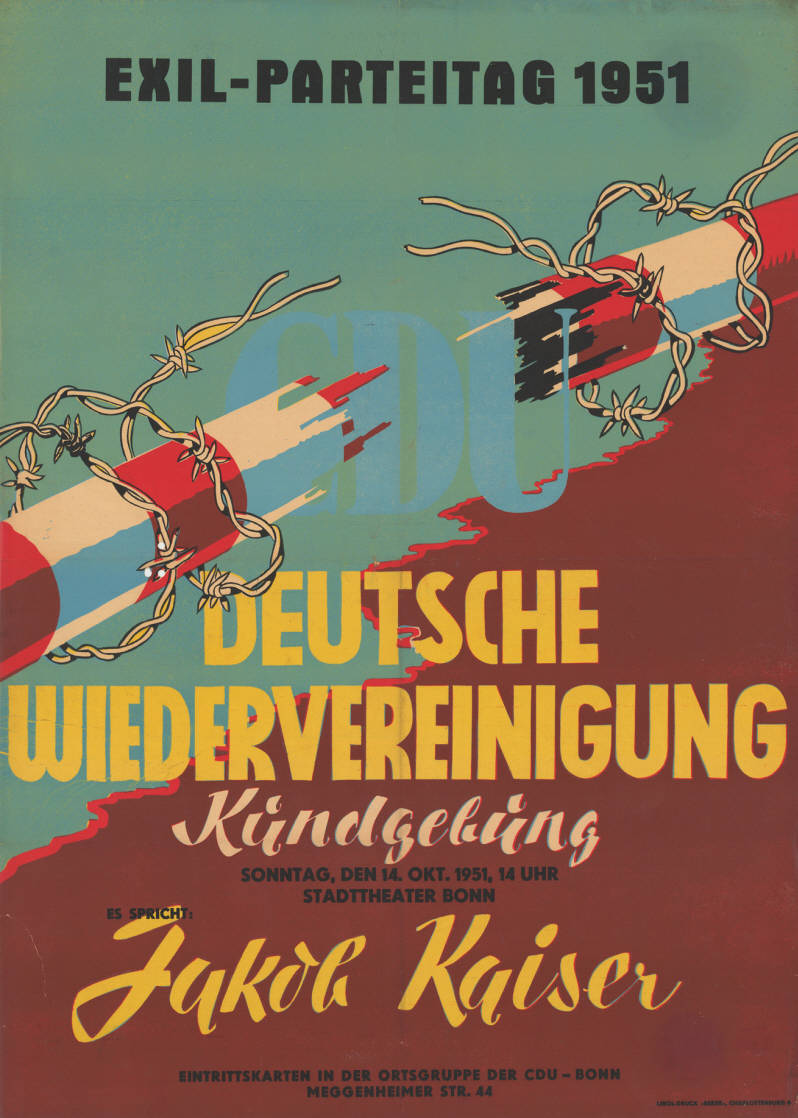
Invitation from the congress of the Exil-CDU 1951

The Exil-CDU (Christian Democratic Union in Exile) was a national federation of the CDU from 1950 to 1990. It represented CDU members who had escaped or been expelled from the Soviet occupation zone or GDR.

== Background ==
From the outset, the work of the democratic parties in the Soviet occupation zone was severely hampered. In 1945, the elected chairman of the East CDU Andreas Hermes was deposed by the occupying authorities, and his successor Jakob Kaiser, after trying to preserve the party in the East, was also deposed. Although the Soviets pushed Otto Nuschke into the nominal chairman position, the all-German working groups of the CDU continued to recognize Kaiser as the only legitimate representative of the CDU.

== Foundation of the Exil-CDU ==
After CDU state chairmen founded a federal party in 1950, the ten members of the 1947 Second Congress who supported Kaiser formed an exiled party congress (the "Exil-CDU") in West Berlin in September 1950. Representatives of delegates who were prevented or chose not to join the Exil-CDU were appointed by an executive committee. Kaiser was reelected as chairman, and the Exil-CDU was recognized by the federal party as the only legitimate representation of the CDU in East Germany.

== Organisation and work ==
The Exil-CDU was treated as a national association by the federal party. It had eight representatives from the Federal Party Committee and delegates from the federal parliaments. The operational work of the Exil-CDU was carried out by the "Eastern Office", which was the central point of contact for escaped CDU members from East Germany. It also coordinated newspaper and propaganda publishing; the newspaper "Der Tag" was published there from 1948–1963, as well as "Voice in Exile" from the mid-1950s to 1991.

The Exil-CDU met a total of 21 times from 1950 to 1991, but faced issues such as underfunding and questions of legitimacy as to how well it could continue to represent its East German members. In 1968, the Exil-CDU's position in the federal CDU was marginalized further by a reduction in the number of delegates it could send to the party.

The Exil-CDU was formally dissolved in 1991 following the reunification of Germany.

== Chairmen ==
- Jakob Kaiser (1950-1961)
- Ernst Lemmer (1961-1970)
- Johann Baptist Gradl (1970-1987)
- Siegfried Dübel (1987-1991)

== Literature ==
- Hans-Otto Kleinmann: Geschichte der CDU 1945–1982, Stuttgart 1993, ISBN 3-421-06541-1; Pages 235–237, Page 480
