= Stefan Körner =

German politician (born 1968)

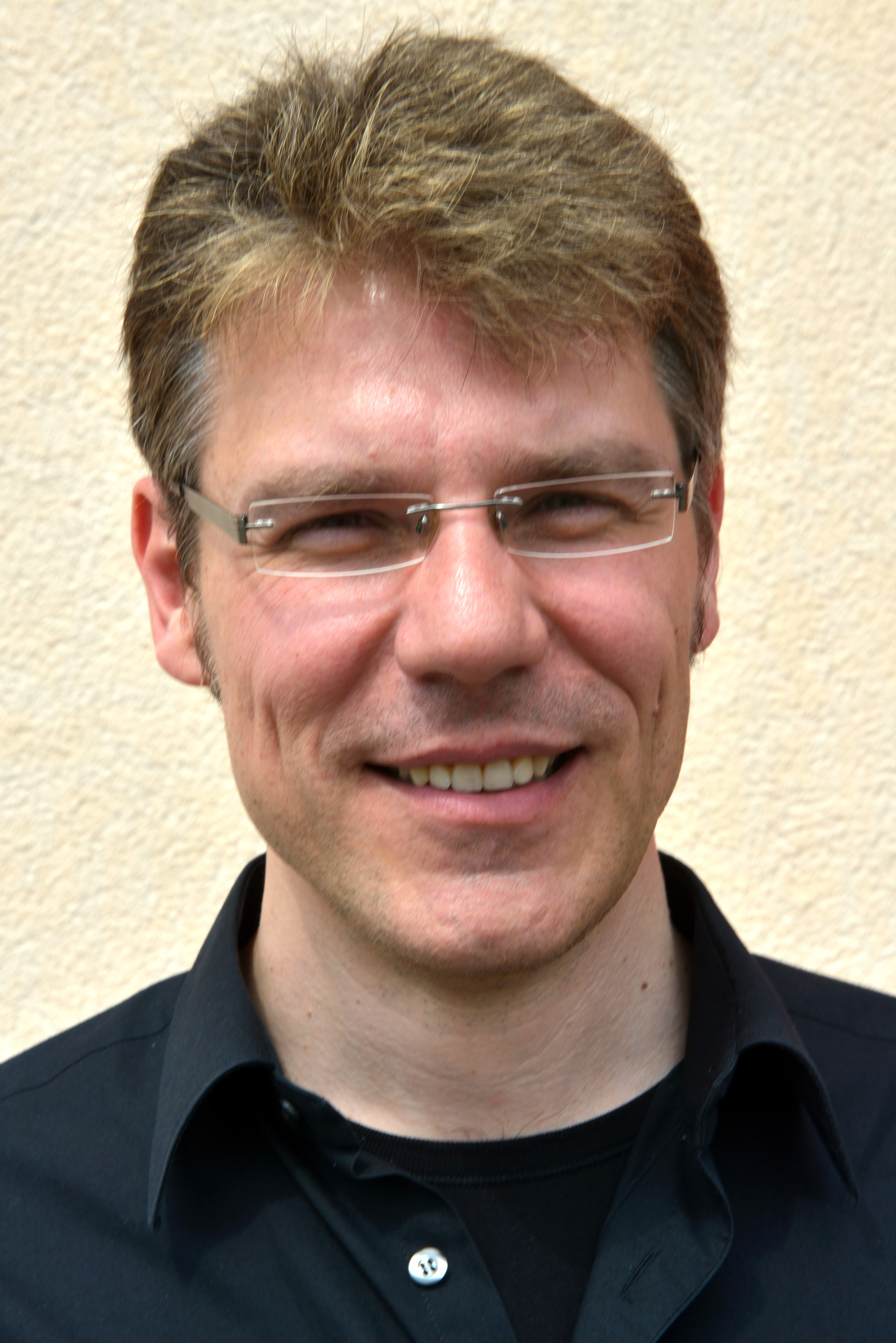
Stefan Körner 2014

Stefan Körner (born 8 November 1968) is a German politician who has been the Chairman of the Pirate Party Germany from June 2014 to August 2016.
