= Edith Körner =

British health service reformer (1921–2000)

Edith Körner CBE
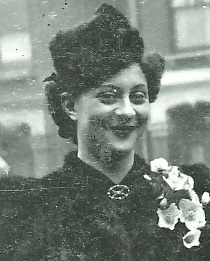
- Born: Edita Leah Löwy; 10 July 1921; Znojmo, Czechoslovakia
- Died: 17 August 2000 (aged 79); Bristol, England
- Other name: Edita Laner
- Occupations: Magistrate and NHS reformer
- Spouse: Stephan Körner (m. 1944)
- Children: 2, including Thomas
- Awards: LLD (Honorary, 1986)

Edith Körner (10 July 1921 – 17 August 2000) was a British magistrate and reformer of the National Health Service. She was the wife of the philosopher Stephan Körner and mother of the mathematician Thomas Körner and the biochemist, writer and translator Ann M. Körner.

== Life ==
Edita Leah Löwy was born in Znojmo, Czechoslovakia, the daughter of a corn miller, on 10 July 1921. She travelled to the United Kingdom as a refugee in 1939, after the Nazis occupied Czechoslovakia. Her family remained behind, with only her brother and several cousins surviving the war. (In 1938/1939, her father changed the family name to Laner in a vain attempt to deceive the Nazis into thinking that he and his family were not Jewish.) She arrived with no money, speaking four languages - Czech, German, Italian and French but little English. Among other jobs, she worked briefly for Reuters.

During the war, she met Stephan Körner, a fellow Czech refugee, who was studying for his doctorate in philosophy at Cambridge; the couple married in London in 1944. After the end of the war and Stephan's release from the Czech army, the couple settled in Bristol where Stephan took up an assistant lectureship at the university.

The Körners had two children, mathematician Thomas William Körner and Ann Körner (who later married Sidney Altman, a Canadian molecular biologist, who shared the Nobel Prize in Chemistry in 1989).

In the late summer of 2000, Mrs. Körner was diagnosed with terminal lung cancer, which had advanced to such a stage that she was given only weeks to live. The couple would soon after be found dead together by a physician on a routine visit to their home in Bristol. Their deaths, which, occurred on 17 August 2000, were ruled suicides by the coroner who stated that he was "sure beyond reasonable doubt that both these persons intended to take their own lives."

== Career ==
Edith and her husband Stephan on their wedding day in 1944

Not content simply to stay at home raising a family, she became a member of the committee overseeing the two local long-stay psychiatric hospitals in the 1950s. This was a fast-changing time for psychiatric medicine, with new drug treatments and changing public attitudes allowing new methods of treatment and care, and Mrs Körner (she never allowed her colleagues to call her by her first name) argued strongly – and successfully – to restructure and reform the sector to take full advantage of these developments.

She was appointed a local magistrate in 1966, and would later become the first woman – and the first immigrant – to chair the board in Bristol (from 1987 to 1990). She chaired the bench during the poll tax upheavals of the late 1980s – some 20,000 people in Bristol refused to pay the charge - maintaining a judicial impartiality despite a strong personal and political objection to the tax. She argued strongly for a clear separation of the judiciary and the executive, and for the court system to be as streamlined and efficient as possible.

By 1976, she had become the chair of the regional health authority for the south-west, gaining a reputation as an informed and intelligent commentator on health-service issues. In 1967, she had studied the use of computers in the health service for the South Western Regional Hospital Board (as it then was), and in 1980 she was asked to chair a full-scale national review of the way information was generated and handled in the NHS.

The Körner Committee studied the matter for four years and produced six major sets of recommendations, all of which were adopted and put into action by the government. The committee's work paved the way for a full-scale computerization of the health service; for the next twenty years, the statistical information used to monitor the work of the NHS was known as "Körner Data".
