= Friedrich Körner =

German general and fighter pilot during World War II (1921–1998)

- Körner as a Leutnant
- Born: 24 January 1921; Schwerte, Province of Westphalia
- Died: 3 September 1998 (aged 77); Bailly, France
- Military career
- Allegiance: Nazi Germany (to 1945); West Germany
- Branch: Luftwaffe; German Air Force
- Service years: 1939–1945; 1956–1979
- Rank: Oberleutnant (Wehrmacht); Brigadegeneral (Bundeswehr)
- Unit: JG 27
- Conflicts: World War II: North African Campaign
- Awards: Knight's Cross of the Iron Cross

Friedrich Körner (24 January 1921 – 3 September 1998) was a World War II Luftwaffe Flying ace. He was also a recipient of the Knight's Cross of the Iron Cross. The Knight's Cross of the Iron Cross, and its variants were the highest awards in the military and paramilitary forces of Nazi Germany during World War II. Körner was credited with 36 victories in over 250 missions. All of his victories were scored whilst flying the Messerschmitt Bf 109.

== Military career ==
Körner was born on 24 January 1921 in Schwerte, in the Province of Westphalia of the Weimar Republic. He joined the Luftwaffe on 15 November 1939. Following flight and fighter pilot training, (Note: Flight training in the Luftwaffe progressed through the levels A1, A2 and B1, B2, referred to as A/B flight training. A training included theoretical and practical training in aerobatics, navigation, long-distance flights and dead-stick landings. The B courses included high-altitude flights, instrument flights, night landings and training to handle the aircraft in difficult situations.) Körner was posted to I. Gruppe (1st group) of Jagdgeschwader 27 (JG 27—27th Fighter Wing) in North Africa on 4 July 1941. At the time, the Gruppe was based at Ayn al-Ġazāla and equipped with the Messerschmitt Bf 109 E-7 fighter aircraft. Körner claimed his first victory on 12 October near Sallum when he shot down a Curtiss P-40 Warhawk.

In June 1942 he scored 20 kills, five on the 26 June making him an "ace-in-a-day", Körner's most successful day. On 4 July 1942, a year to the day of his arrival, he was shot down whilst scrambling to intercept a Royal Air Force (RAF) bomber formation over the front line near El Alamein in his Bf 109 F-4/Trop (Werknummer 8696—factory number) "Red 11". His victor was Lieutenant Lawrence Waugh of 1 Squadron SAAF. Körner was captured and sent to a prisoner of war camp in Canada, and released in 1947.

== After the war ==
In January 1956, Körner joined the West German Air Force, at the time referred to as the Bundesluftwaffe, holding the rank of Oberleutnant. Initially serving as a flight instructor, he later received general staff training. He retired from military service on 30 June 1979, having reached the rank of Brigadegeneral. Following his retirement, Körner and his wife lived in Paris. He died on 3 September 1998 at the age of 77 in Bailly north-central France.

== Summary of career ==
=== Aerial victory claims ===
Körner was credited with 36 aerial victories claimed in approximately 250 combat missions, all of which over North Africa. Mathews and Foreman, authors of Luftwaffe Aces — Biographies and Victory Claims, researched the German Federal Archives and found records for 36 aerial victory claims, all of which over North Africa.

Chronicle of aerial victories
This and the ♠ (Ace of spades) indicates those aerial victories which made Körner an "ace-in-a-day", a term which designates a fighter pilot who has shot down five or more airplanes in a single day.
Claim	Date	Time	Type	Location	Claim	Date	Time	Type	Location
– 2. Staffel of Jagdgeschwader 27 – Sicily, Balkans and North Africa — 19 July – 17 November 1941
1	12 October 1941	09:34	P-40	southeast of Sallum	2	20 October 1941	09:45	Blenheim	100 km (62 mi) north of Marsa Luccech
– 2. Staffel of Jagdgeschwader 27 – In North Africa — 18 November 1941 – 4 July 1942
3	10 December 1941	14:03	Boston	25 km (16 mi) east of Bir Hacheim	20	14 June 1942	11:05	P-40	north of Kambut
4	28 December 1941	08:55	Hurricane	northeast of El Hasseiat	21	14 June 1942	11:10	P-40	north of Kambut
5	11 January 1942	12:50	P-40	north of Marsa al-Brega	22	14 June 1942	17:05	Beaufighter	north-northeast of Derna
6	13 January 1942	14:35	P-40	Antelat	23	16 June 1942	15:20	P-40	east of El Adem
7	7 February 1942	14:27	Blenheim	northeast of Derna	24	16 June 1942	18:50	P-40	southwest of Kambut
8	8 February 1942	14:27	P-40	Bomba Bay	25	17 June 1942	08:50	P-40	east of Sidi Rezegh
9	9 March 1942	16:50	Albacore	southwest of Sidi Barrani	26♠	26 June 1942	11:48	P-40	west of Marsa Matruh
10	19 March 1942	10:35	P-40	north of Kambut	27♠	26 June 1942	12:18	P-40	west of Marsa Matruh
11	20 March 1942	08:03	P-40	south of Martuba	28♠	26 June 1942	18:42	P-40	south of Marsa Matruh
12	20 March 1942	08:08	P-40	south of Ayn al-Ġazāla	29♠	26 June 1942	18:46	Spitfire	Marsa Matruh
13	21 March 1942	08:55	Boston	southeast of Bir Hacheim	30♠	26 June 1942	19:05	Spitfire	southeast of Marsa Matruh
14	2 April 1942	14:28	Hurricane	north of Kambut	31	1 July 1942	19:01	P-40	west of Borg El Arab
15	27 May 1942	15:30	P-40	south of Kambut	32	1 July 1942	19:03	P-40	west of Borg El Arab
16	29 May 1942	07:52	P-40	west of Tobruk	33	1 July 1942	19:11	P-40	west of Borg El Arab
17	13 June 1942	06:40	P-40	south of Fort Acroma	34	2 July 1942	18:15	P-40	El Alamein
18	13 June 1942	06:50	Hurricane	north of Wadi Es Sahaae	35	2 July 1942	18:20	P-40	Borg El Arab
19	13 June 1942	06:53	P-40	Tobruk	36	3 July 1942	15:11	Hurricane	southeast of El Alamein

=== Awards ===
- Iron Cross (1939) 2nd and 1st Class
- Honor Goblet of the Luftwaffe on 10 August 1942 as Leutnant and pilot
- German Cross in Gold on 21 August 1942 as Leutnant in the I./Jagdgeschwader 27
- Knight's Cross of the Iron Cross on 6 September 1942 as Leutnant and Staffelführer of the 2./Jagdgeschwader 27 (Note: According to Scherzer as pilot in the I./Jagdgeschwader 27.)
