= Thomas William Körner =

British mathematician (born 1946)

- Born: 17 February 1946 (age 80)
- Education: Trinity Hall, University of Cambridge
- Awards: Salem Prize (1972)
- Scientific career
- Workplaces: University of Cambridge
- Thesis: Some Results on Kronecker, Dirichlet and Helson Sets (1971)
- Doctoral advisor: Nicholas Varopoulos
- Website: http://www.dpmms.cam.ac.uk/~twk10/

Thomas William Körner (born 17 February 1946) is a British pure mathematician and the author of three books on popular mathematics. He is titular Professor of Fourier Analysis in the University of Cambridge and a Fellow of Trinity Hall. He is the son of the philosopher Stephan Körner and of Edith Körner.

He studied at Trinity Hall, Cambridge, and wrote his PhD thesis Some Results on Kronecker, Dirichlet and Helson Sets there in 1971, studying under Nicholas Varopoulos. In 1972 he won the Salem Prize.

He has written academic mathematics books aimed at undergraduates:

- Fourier Analysis
- Exercises for Fourier Analysis
- A Companion to Analysis
- Vectors, Pure and Applied
- Calculus for the Ambitious

He has also written three books aimed at secondary school students, the popular 1996 title The Pleasures of Counting, Naive Decision Making (published 2008) on probability, statistics and game theory, and Where Do Numbers Come From? (published October 2019).
