= Existential humanism =

Ethical Philosophy

Existential humanism is humanism that validates the human subject as struggling for self-knowledge and self-responsibility.

== Concepts ==
Søren Kierkegaard suggested that the best use of our capacity for making choices is to freely choose to live a fully human life, rooted in a personal search for values, rather than an external code.

Jean-Paul Sartre said "existentialism is a humanism" because it expresses the power of human beings to make freely-willed choices, independent of the influence of religion or society. Unlike traditional humanisms, however, Sartre disavowed any reliance on an essential nature of man – on deriving values from the facts of human nature – but rather saw human value as self-created through undertaking projects in the world: experiments in living.

Albert Camus, in his book The Plague, suggests that some of us may choose to be heroic, even knowing that it will bring us neither reward nor salvation; and Simone de Beauvoir, in her book The Ethics of Ambiguity, argues that embracing our own personal freedom requires us to fight for the freedoms of all humanity.

== Criticism ==
Martin Heidegger attacked Sartre's concept of existential humanism in his Letter on Humanism of 1946, accusing Sartre of elevating Reason above Being.

Michel Foucault followed Heidegger in attacking Sartre's humanism as a kind of theology of man, though in his emphasis on the self-creation of the human being he has in fact been seen as very close to Sartre's existential humanism.

== See also ==
- Existentialism
- Humanism
- Merleau-Ponty
