= Stephan Körner =

British philosopher (1913–2000)

Stephan Körner FBA
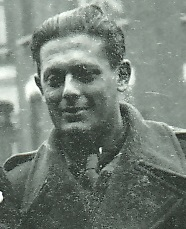
- Born: 26 September 1913; Ostrava, Austria-Hungary
- Died: 17 August 2000 (aged 86); Bristol, England
- Spouse: Edith Laner (m. 1944)
- Children: 2, including Thomas

Education
- Education: Charles University; Trinity Hall, Cambridge
- Doctoral advisor: R. B. Braithwaite

Philosophical work
- Era: Contemporary philosophy
- Region: Western philosophy
- School: Analytic philosophy, Kantianism
- Institutions: University of Bristol; Yale University
- Doctoral students: David Kolb
- Main interests: Philosophy of mathematics, epistemology, metaphysics

Stephan Körner (Austrian German: [ˈkœrnɐ]; 26 September 1913 – 17 August 2000 (Note: Several contemporary news reports (and sources dependent on them) give 18 August, apparently in error. The date (and cause) of death was concluded by a Coroner (Paul Forrest, Coroner's Court, Bristol, UK, 18 October 2000).)) was a British philosopher, who specialised in the work of Kant, the study of concepts, and in the philosophy of mathematics.

Born to a Jewish family in what would soon become Czechoslovakia, Körner left that country to avoid certain death at the hands of the Nazis after the German occupation in 1939, and came to the United Kingdom as a refugee, where he began his study of philosophy; by 1952 he was a professor of philosophy at the University of Bristol, taking up a second professorship at Yale in 1970. He was married to Edith Körner, and was the father of the mathematician Thomas Körner and the biochemist, writer and translator Ann M. Körner.

== Early life ==
Körner was born in Ostrava, then part of Austria-Hungary, on 26 September 1913. He was the only son of a teacher of classics and his wife. His father had studied classics in Vienna, while at the same time, winning prizes in mathematics to supplement his meagre income (a fellow student was a certain Leon Trotsky, who was frequently asked, "When is that great revolution that you are always talking about going to happen?"). Despite an early wish to study philosophy, Stephan was dissuaded by his father, who feared that his son would become a penniless academic; he was persuaded to study something more practical, and took his degree in law at Charles University in Prague, completing it in 1935. (He practised law only briefly but retained a strong interest, attending seminars at Yale Law School after his appointment as a visiting professor at Yale in the 1970s.) From 1936 to 1939 he carried out his military service, serving as an officer in the cavalry.

After German troops moved into the country in March 1939, a schoolmate of his, an officer in the SS, warned the Jewish family that life in German-occupied Moravia was no longer safe. His parents refused to leave, believing that they had nothing to fear since they were not communists. His father died in 1939, most likely by his own hand, during deportation to Nisko and his mother was murdered in 1941 after deportation to Minsk Ghetto, Belarus, on Transport F. His first cousin Ruth Maier was one of many other family members who was murdered at Auschwitz, after her arrest in and deportation from Norway in 1942. She is remembered as "Norway's Anne Frank". Stephan travelled with two friends, Otto Eisner and Willi Haas, through Poland to the United Kingdom, arriving a refugee just as the Second World War began. In Britain, he rejoined the army of the émigré Czechoslovak government; he saw service with them during the Battle of France in 1940 before returning to Britain.

He received a small grant to continue his education at the University of Cambridge, where he studied philosophy under R. B. Braithwaite at Trinity Hall; among others, he was taught by Ludwig Wittgenstein. Professor Braithwaite was exceedingly kind to his refugee student. On one occasion, Braithwaite invited him to his home saying, "Someone has given me a Hungarian salami; would you come to my house and show me how to eat it?" Such invitations were welcome since Stephan made little money as a waiter in a Greek restaurant and survived on "one fourpenny meat pie per day." In 1943 he was recalled to the Czechoslovak army, serving as a sergeant in the infantry during the push through France and into Germany. He would later say that he survived the fighting outside Dunkirk due to Dickens; recuperating in hospital from a minor wound, a doctor refused to discharge him until he had had another day to finish his novel. As a result, he missed the heavy fighting the next day, when many of his close friends were killed.

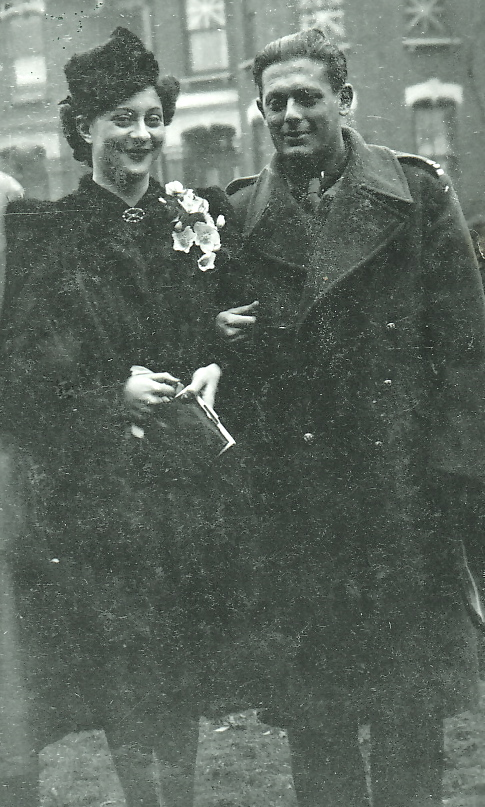
Stephan and Edith Körner on their wedding day in 1944.

He was awarded his PhD in 1944; shortly afterwards, he married Edith Laner ("Diti"; born Edita Leah Löwy; in 1938/39, her father changed the family name to Laner in a vain attempt to deceive the Nazis into thinking that he and his family were not Jewish), a fellow Czech refugee, whom he had met in London in 1941. He remained in the Czechoslovak army until 1946.

== Academic career ==
After his army service, he worked at Cardiff University, tutoring students in German. He took up his first academic post in 1947, lecturing in philosophy at the University of Bristol. In 1952, he was appointed to the sole professorship and chairmanship of his department, which he would hold until 1979. In 1965 and 1966 he was Dean of the Faculty of Arts, and from 1968 to 1971 a Pro-Vice-Chancellor.

During this time he worked as a visiting professor of philosophy at Brown University in 1957, Yale University in 1960, the University of North Carolina, Chapel Hill in 1963, University of Texas at Austin in 1964 and Indiana University in 1967. In 1970 he returned to Yale with a tenured visiting professorship in philosophy, holding it jointly with the Bristol post for nine years, and then as his sole post from 1979 to 1984. Bristol appointed him a professor emeritus on his retirement, and he subsequently held a visiting professorship at the University of Graz from 1980 to 1989.

He received honorary doctorates from the Queen's University Belfast in 1981, and Graz in 1984, where he was appointed to an honorary professorship in 1986. Bristol appointed him an honorary fellow in 1987. Trinity Hall bestowed upon him the same honour in 1991.

He was President of the British Society for the Philosophy of Science in 1965, the Aristotelian Society in 1967, the International Union of History and Philosophy of Science in 1969, and the Mind Association in 1973. He edited the journal Ratio from 1961 to 1980. He also served on the editorial board of Erkenntnis from 1974 to 1999. In 1967 he was elected a Fellow of the British Academy.

== Philosophical work ==
In 1955 he published his first two major works. Kant, an introduction for non-specialists to Immanuel Kant's work, went through several impressions over the next three decades and is still regarded as a minor classic in the field; it was one of the first post-war books to reintroduce Kant to the English-speaking world. The fact that in this and later works Korner put forward a controversial view that Kant's categories apply directly to ordinary empirical science, was little noticed by a public grateful for any short work covering all of Kant's philosophy.

The second, Conceptual Thinking, was a more specialised study, studying the way in which people deal with "exact" and "inexact" concepts – exact concepts, like logical constructs or mathematical ideas, could be clearly defined, whilst inexact concepts, like 'colour', would always have unclear boundaries. In 1957 he expanded on this, editing Observation and Interpretation, a collection of papers arising from a seminar which brought together both philosophers and physicists to discuss these questions.

His work led him into the philosophy of mathematics, on which he would publish a textbook in 1960; Philosophy of Mathematics, which took as its central theme the question of how applied mathematics can be metaphysically possible.

He also wrote on the philosophy of science in Experience and Theory (1966), including work on theoretical incommensurability, the concept that two directly contradictory theories – such as classical mechanics and relativity – can coexist, without either being specifically "wrong".

In 1969 he published What is Philosophy?, and in 1970 Categorial Frameworks, attempts to put forward his views to a general audience. Experience and Conduct, published in 1979, discussed how we evaluate and develop our own preferences and value systems; his final work, Metaphysics: Its Structure and Function (1984) was a wide-ranging study of metaphysics.

== Personal life ==
Körner was remembered by colleagues and pupils as "extraordinarily handsome with an astonishing Czech accent ... [with] a certain sense of grandeur about him". He retained an old-fashioned sense of manners, formal but courteous, as well as a formal appearance. Even on the hottest days, he was never seen without a tie and jacket.

He and Edith were remembered by friends as close and devoted to one another. In their early married life they fitted the conventional academic mould – whilst Körner worked at his studies, she raised the family, looked after the house, managed the finances – but after the children had grown and left she worked at her own career, eventually becoming the chairman of the magistrates' court in Bristol and overseeing the redevelopment of the National Health Service's information-management system. Edith managed their lives in a way to ensure that he could work freely; he has said that "Diti does everything, but leaves the philosophy to me".

The couple had two children – Thomas, a professor of mathematics, and Ann, a biochemist, writer and translator, who married Sidney Altman (a joint winner of the Nobel Prize in Chemistry in 1989).

Following Edith's diagnosis with advanced cancer in the summer of 2000, they chose to die together in August of that year, on the 17th.

They were survived by both children and by four grandchildren.

== Publications ==
=== Books/monographs authored ===
- (1955) Kant.
- (1955) Conceptual Thinking (corrected republication, 1959)
- (1960) The Philosophy of Mathematics. Dover Publications, ISBN 0-486-25048-2
- (1966) Experience and Theory - An Essay in the Philosophy of Science doi:10.4324/9780203706336
- (1967) Kant's Conception of Freedom Oxford University Press.
- (1969) What is Philosophy? - One Philosopher's Answer. later published as Fundamental Questions in Philosophy
- (1970) Categorical Frameworks.
- (1971) Abstraction in Science and Morals, 24th Eddington Memorial Lecture (Cambridge University Press)
- (1976) Experience and Conduct..
- (1984) Metaphysics: Its Structure and Function.

Books edited

- (1957) Observation and Interpretation: a Symposium of Philosophers and Physicists.
- (1971) Practical Reason - Papers and Discussions
- (1976) Explanation - Papers and Discussions
- (1976).Philosophy of Logic- Papers And Discussions (Oxford, Blackwell, and California University Press)

=== Select papers/chapters ===
- (1957) “Some Types of Philosophical Thinking” in C. A. Mace (ed.) British Moral Philosophy in the Mid-Century London: George Allen & Unwin, pp. 115–131
- (1959) "Broad on Philosophical Method" in Paul Arthur Schilpp (ed.) The Philosophy of C.D. Broad
- (1968) "Kant’s Conception of Freedom" [Dawes Hicks lecture] Proceedings of the British Academy 53, 1967
- (1970) "Description, Analysis and Metaphysics," in Joseph Bobik (ed.) The Nature of Philosophical Inquiry, (South Bend, Indiana, Notre Dame University Press)
- (1975) "On Some Relations Between Logic and Metaphysics," in The Logical Enterprise, (ed.) Alan R. Anderson et al. (New Haven, Yale University Press).
- (1976) "On the Subject Matter of Philosophy," in H. D. Lewis (ed.) Contemporary British Philosophy (London, Allen & Unwin)
- (1980) "Science and the Organization of Belief," in: Mellor, D. H., (ed.). Science, Belief, and Behaviour: Essays in Honour of R. B. Braithwaite. Cambridge [Eng.]; New York : Cambridge University Press. ISBN 978-0-521-22960-9.
- (1986) "On Some Methods and Results of Philosophical Analysis" in Shanker, S.G. (ed.) Philosophy in Britain Today
- (1991) "On the relation between Common Sense, Science and Metaphysics," in A. Phillips Griffiths (ed.), A. J. Ayer: Memorial Essays (Royal Institute of Philosophy Supplements, pp. 89-104). Cambridge: Cambridge University Press. doi:10.1017/CBO9780511628740.008
- (1991) "On the Logic of Practical Evaluation," in: Peter Geach (ed.) Logic and Ethics, Nijhoff International Philosophy Series, vol 41. Springer, Dordrecht doi:10.1007/978-94-011-3352-4_10

For more complete publication details see Körner's PhilPapers entry or 1987 bibliography.

Festschrift

- (1987) Stephan Körner — Philosophical Analysis and Reconstruction, Jan T. J. Srzednicki (ed.) ISBN 978-94-009-3639-3

== See also ==
- Schema (Kant)

== Sources ==
- Shepherdson, John (16 January 2003). "Stephan Körner 1913–2000" (PDF). Proceedings of the British Academy. 115 (Biographical Memoirs of Fellows, I): 276–295.
