= Laurentius Siemer =

German Dominican priest (1888–1956)

- Born: 8 March 1888; Elisabethfehn, Cloppenburg, Oldenburg, German Empire
- Died: 21 October 1956 (aged 68); Cologne, North Rhine-Westphalia, West Germany
- Citizenship: German
- Occupation: Dominican priest

Laurentius Siemer (German: [laʊˈʁɛntsi̯ʊs ˈziːmɐ]; born Josef Siemer; 8 March 1888 – 21 October 1956) was a Dominican priest, and Provincial of the Dominican Province of Teutonia, Germany during the Nazi period. A significant figure in Catholic resistance to Nazism, he became a spiritual leader of the German Resistance movement and was imprisoned by the Nazis. Implicated in the July Plot, he survived the war in hiding and assisted in drafting Germany's post war constitution. In later life he became a TV celebrity.

== Life ==
Born to a large family in northern Germany, Siemer was ordained as a priest of the Dominican Order in 1914 and studied philosophy, theology, philology and history. He was appointed rector of the Order's high school in Vechta in 1921, and became Provincial of the Dominican Province of Teutonia (roughly, the whole of Germany north of Mainz) in 1932.

After initially being disengaged, Siemer came to oppose the Nazi regime. According to Deutsche Welle, Siemer called on German Catholics not to follow the cultural currents of the time, but rather, to live by the principles of the Catholic religion. The Gestapo arrested Siemer in Cologne in 1935, as part of the "Currency Fraud Cases" targeting Catholic clergy and held him in custody for several months. The fraud trials were attempt to undermine the influence of Dominicans on German Catholics.

From 1940, the Gestapo launched an intense persecution of the monasteries - invading, searching and appropriating them. Siemer was influential in the Committee for Matters Relating to the Orders, which formed in response to Nazi attacks against Catholic monasteries and aimed to encourage the bishops to intercede on behalf of the Orders and more strongly oppose the Nazi state.

Increasingly, Laurentius became involved in the resistance movement. He spoke to resistance circles on Catholic social teaching as a starting point for Germany's reconstruction, and worked with Carl Goerdeler and others in planning for a post-coup Germany. Following the failure of the 1944 July Plot to assassinate Hitler, Siemer evaded capture by the Gestapo at his Schwichteler monastery, and hid out until the end of the war, thus remaining one of the few conspirators to survive the purge.

After the war, Siemer assisted in the drafting of the German constitution. He established the Walberberg Institute as an educational institute for young people near Bonn. According to Deutsche Welle, Siemer was a strong advocate of Christian socialism, and became a popular TV talk show guest in Germany, known as the "TV Father".

== See also ==
- Kirchenkampf
- Catholic Church and Nazi Germany
- Cologne Circle
