= Jakob Kaiser =

German politician and resistance leader (1888–1961)

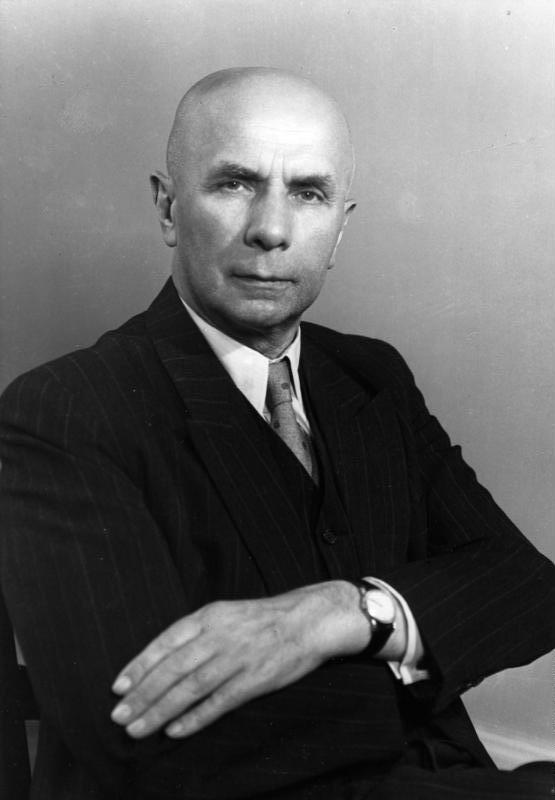
- Portrait of Kaiser, 1950

Federal Minister of All-German Affairs
- In office 20 September 1949 – 29 October 1957
- Chancellor: Konrad Adenauer
- Preceded by: Office established
- Succeeded by: Ernst Lemmer

Member of the Bundestag for Essen III
- In office 7 September 1949 – 6 October 1957
- Preceded by: Constituency established
- Succeeded by: Hans Toussaint

Member of the Reichstag for Düsseldorf East
- In office 21 March 1933 – 12 December 1933
- Preceded by: Multi-member district
- Succeeded by: Constituency abolished

Personal details
- Born: 8 February 1888 Hammelburg, Lower Franconia, Kingdom of Bavaria, German Empire
- Died: 7 May 1961 (aged 73)
- Party: Centre (before 1945); CDU (after 1945)

Jakob Kaiser (8 February 1888 – 7 May 1961) was a German politician and resistance leader during World War II. He served in the Reichstag before the war and the Bundestag after. He was also the first Federal Minister of All-German Affairs, serving from 1949 until 1957.

== Early life ==
Kaiser was born on 8 February 1888 in Hammelburg, Lower Franconia, Kingdom of Bavaria. Following in his father's footsteps, Kaiser began a career as a bookbinder. It was during this time that he became politically active as a member of a Catholic trade union, through which he became a leader of the Christian labour movement during the Weimar Republic.

== Weimar Republic ==
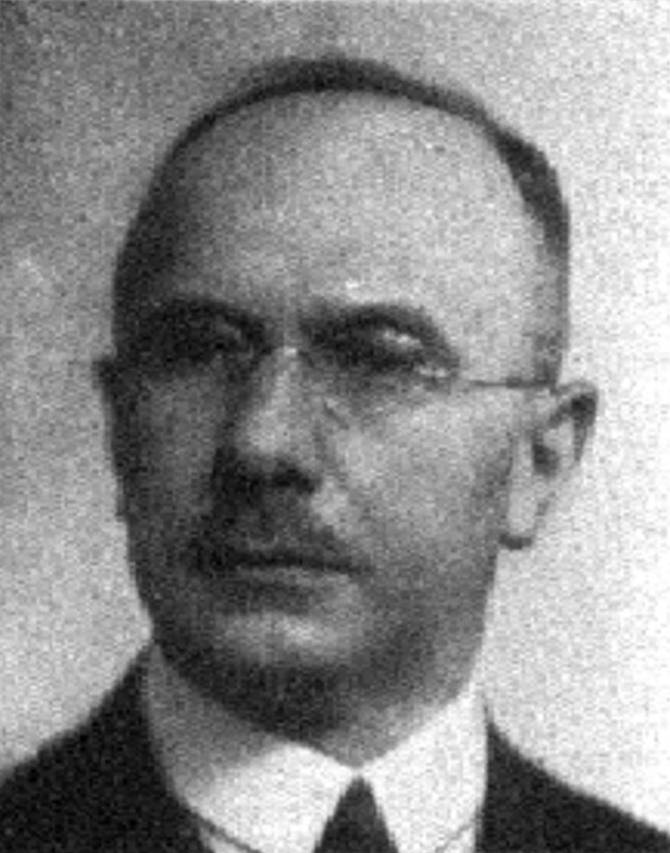
1933 Reichstag portrait

Kaiser increased his participation in politics by becoming a member of the Centre Party, where he began serving in the role of representative chairman of Rhineland in 1919. He was elected to the Reichstag in 1933.

== Resistance ==
After the Nazis came to power in 1933, Adolf Hitler abolished all unions, replacing them with the Nazi-controlled German Labour Front. Kaiser opposed National Socialism and he joined the resistance in 1934. He was arrested by the Gestapo in 1938 under suspicion of treason, but he was released shortly thereafter.

Through his participation in the Cologne Resistance Circle, Kaiser became a close associate of the former Mayor of Leipzig, Carl Goerdeler. His relationship with Goerdeler allowed him to come into contact with Claus von Stauffenberg. Although he was not directly informed of the 20 July Plot, his knowledge of Stauffenberg's intention to assassinate Hitler as well as his close ties to the resistance group forced him to go into hiding for the remainder of World War II.

== Leader of the East German CDU ==
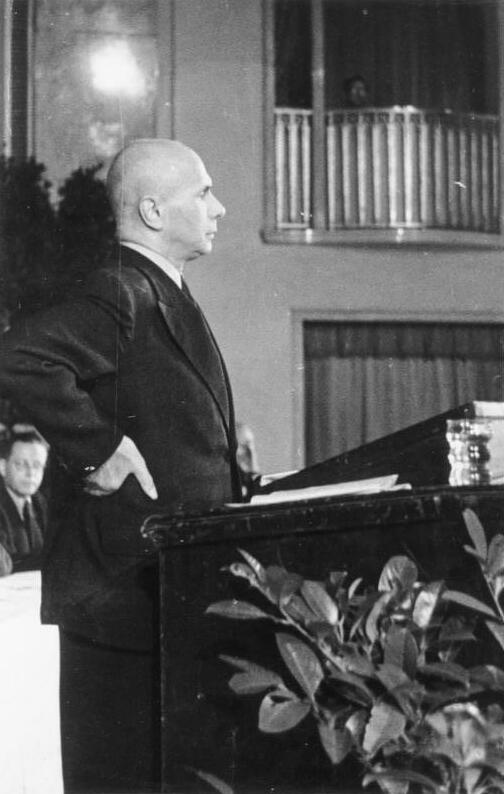
Kaiser at the East German CDU convention, 1947

After the war, Kaiser returned to politics and worked with Andreas Hermes to found the East Berlin division of the Christian Democratic Union (CDU). He was elected president of the Berlin CDU (both the Western and Eastern sections of the party).

Kaiser belonged to a group within the CDU called the Christian Socialists. They called for the nationalisation of some major industries. In 1946, Kaiser helped found the Free German Trade Union Federation (FDGB). In the same year he was elected co-chairman of the East German CDU (together with Ernst Lemmer). Although his political views were progressive, he was critical of the Communist Party of Germany and its Soviet-supported leaders. His belief that the German Congress was controlled by the Soviets resulted in his refusal to join.

In 1947, during the Ahlen conference, a joint conference of West and East German CDU leaders, Kaiser's plan of nationalisation of key industries and other moderate left-wing ideas were adopted by the party. That same year, the Soviets forced him to resign as party chairman. However, he remained a member of the party's executive committee.

== Member of the West German CDU ==
In 1948, Kaiser was forced to leave East Berlin and he went to West Berlin where he joined the West German Christian Democratic Union (CDU). Within the CDU he became a major rival of Konrad Adenauer, the party leader. Kaiser disagreed with Adenauer's social market economy and called for the nationalisation of key industries. Kaiser strongly believed in a neutral, united Germany, and hoped that Germany would be a bridge between the West and the East. In 1950, Kaiser was elected a vice-chairman of the West German CDU. From 1949 until 1957 he was Minister of All-German Affairs in Adenauer's cabinet.

== Personal life and death ==
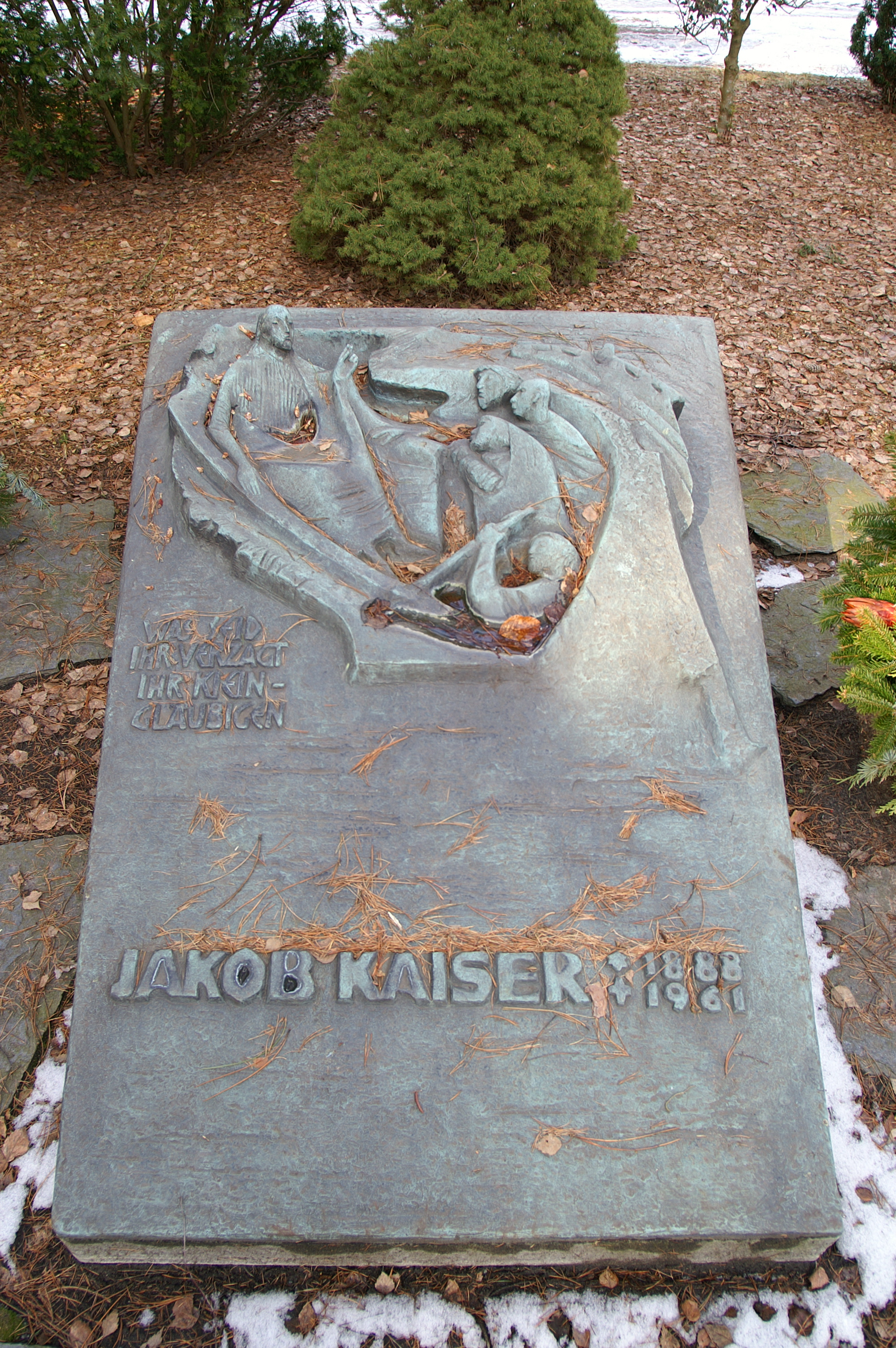
Kaiser's grave in the Waldfriedhof Zehlendorf

Kaiser died on 7 May 1961 in Berlin. He is buried in the Waldfriedhof Zehlendorf, in the Steglitz-Zehlendorf borough of Berlin.

Kaiser was married twice. In 1953, after the death of his first wife, he married his longtime colleague in trade union activism, Elfriede Kaiser-Nebgen (1890–1983). She was instrumental in helping to save his life after the failure of the 20 July Plot.

== Legacy ==
- The Jakob-Kaiser-Platz, a transportation hub in Charlottenburg-Nord (Berlin), was named after him on 12 May 1961, five days after his death.
- The Jakob-Kaiser-Haus is home to 1,745 offices, 314 of which belong to current members of the German Bundestag

== See also ==
- Catholic resistance to Nazi Germany
- Christian Democratic Union in Exile
