= Nikolaus Gross =

German resistance fighter (1898–1945)

Blessed Nikolaus Gross
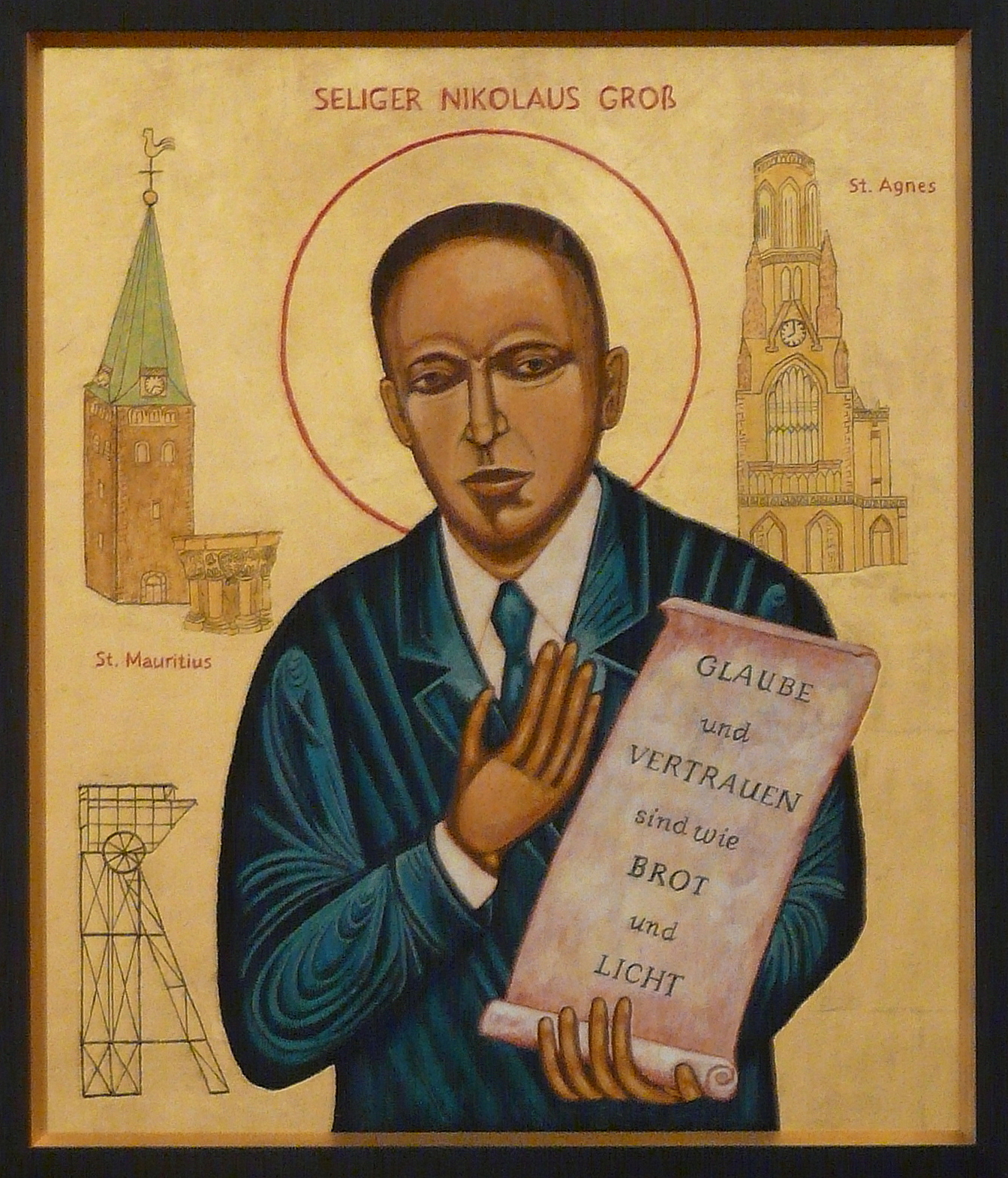

Martyr
- Born: 30 September 1898; Niederwenigern, Hattingen, German Empire
- Died: 23 January 1945 (aged 46); Plötzensee Prison, Berlin, Nazi Germany
- Venerated in: Roman Catholic Church
- Beatified: 7 October 2001, Saint Peter's Square, Vatican City by Pope John Paul II
- Feast: 15 January
- Attributes: lounge suit, holding a scroll with his quote "Faith and trust are like bread and light"

Nikolaus Gross (German: Groß) (30 September 1898 – 23 January 1945) was a German Roman Catholic layman and trade unionist. Gross first worked in crafts requiring skilled labor before becoming a coal miner like his father while joining a range of trade union and political movements. But he soon settled on becoming a journalist before he got married while World War II prompted him to become a resistance fighter in the time of the Third Reich and for his anti-violent rhetoric and approach to opposing Adolf Hitler. He was also one of those implicated and arrested for the assassination attempt on Hitler despite not being involved himself.

His beatification process saw it acknowledged that Gross had died in 1945 in odium fidei ("in hatred of the faith"). Pope John Paul II presided over the beatification for the murdered journalist on 7 October 2001 in Saint Peter's Square.

== Life ==
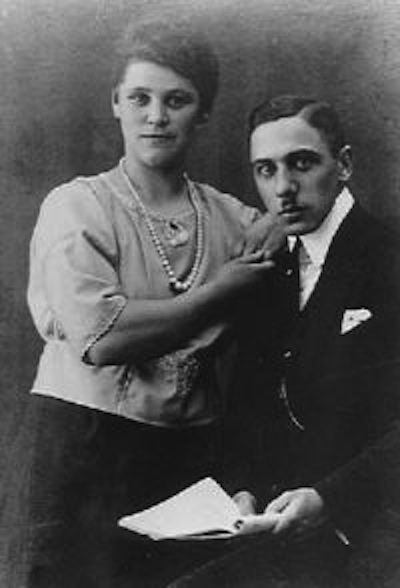
Nikolaus and his wife Elisabeth.

Nikolaus Gross was born in Niederwenigern (today an urban district of Hattingen) on 30 September 1898 to a colliery blacksmith; he was baptized on 2 October and he attended the local Catholic school from 1905 until 1912.

Gross first worked in a plate rolling mill as a grinder (1912–15) and then as a coal miner from 1915 until 1920. In June 1917 he joined the Christian Mineworkers' Trade Union and in 1918 joined a Christian political movement. On 6 June 1919 he joined the Saint Anthony's Miners' Association.

He furthered his education in evening courses at the Volksverein für das katholische Deutschland and in 1920 gave up his job as a miner and worked for the Christian Mineworkers' Trade Union ("Gewerkverein Christlicher Bergarbeiter") in Oberhausen in a secretarial role from July 1920 until June 1921. From July 1921 until May 1922 he was an assistant editor at the union newspaper known as the "Bergknappen" in Essen. From June 1922 until October 1922 he was a trade union secretarial worker in Waldenburg in Lower Silesia and afterwards in Zwickau and then at (December 1924 to December 1926) Bottrop. In January 1927 he changed jobs to become the assistant editor at the Westdeutsche Arbeiterzeitung which was the organizational organ of the Katholische Arbeitnehmer-Bewegung ("Catholic Workers' Movement" or K.A.B.) before soon becoming the general editor in 1929. The Westdeutsche Arbeiterzeitung stood out as a paper that was critical of the Nazis. After the elections in March 1933 the paper was banned for three weeks. In the beginning of 1935 the paper bore the name Kettelerwacht and was banned once and for all on 19 November 1938 but he continued to publish an underground edition to expose the lies of propaganda. Gross took over the leadership of the Düsseldorf K.A.B. for its secretarial worker had been called into the Wehrmacht. His activities were linked with travels which would be a help to him in his upcoming resistance activities. He also represented the K.A.B. at Catholic conferences.

He had good friends from the K.A.B. as well as trade unions and the Christian politicians and all would discuss alternatives to the Nazi regime in the so-called Cologne Circle which was meeting in the K.A.B.'s center called the Kettelerhaus in Cologne no later than 1942. This group worked with those in Berlin about Carl Friedrich Goerdeler and took part in his personal plans for the time after Adolf Hitler was out of office should that have happened.

Gross later became engaged to Elisabeth Koch (11.03.1901-21.02.1971) and the two later married on 24 May 1923. The pair had seven children:

- Nikolaus Heinrich (1925-2005)
- Bernhardine Elisabeth (1926-2015)
- Marianne (1927-2020)
- Liesel (1929-2001)
- Alexander (1931-2019)
- Bernhard (1934-2019)
- Helene (b. 1939)

In 1940 he endured interrogations and house searches since he was being monitored at the time. On 12 August 1944 he was arrested sometime towards noon in connection with the failed plot to kill Hitler at the Wolf's Lair in East Prussia. He was first taken to Ravensbrück and then to Berlin at the Tegel prison (from September 1944) where his wife visited him twice and reported the torture done to a hand and both his arms. From prison he sent letters to his wife including the farewell letter just moments before he died. On 15 January 1945 he was sentenced to death at the Volksgerichtshof (Roland Freisler condemned him) and was hanged on 23 January 1945 at the Plötzensee prison in Berlin. His remains were cremated and his ashes were scattered at a sewage plant.

== Beatification and other honors ==
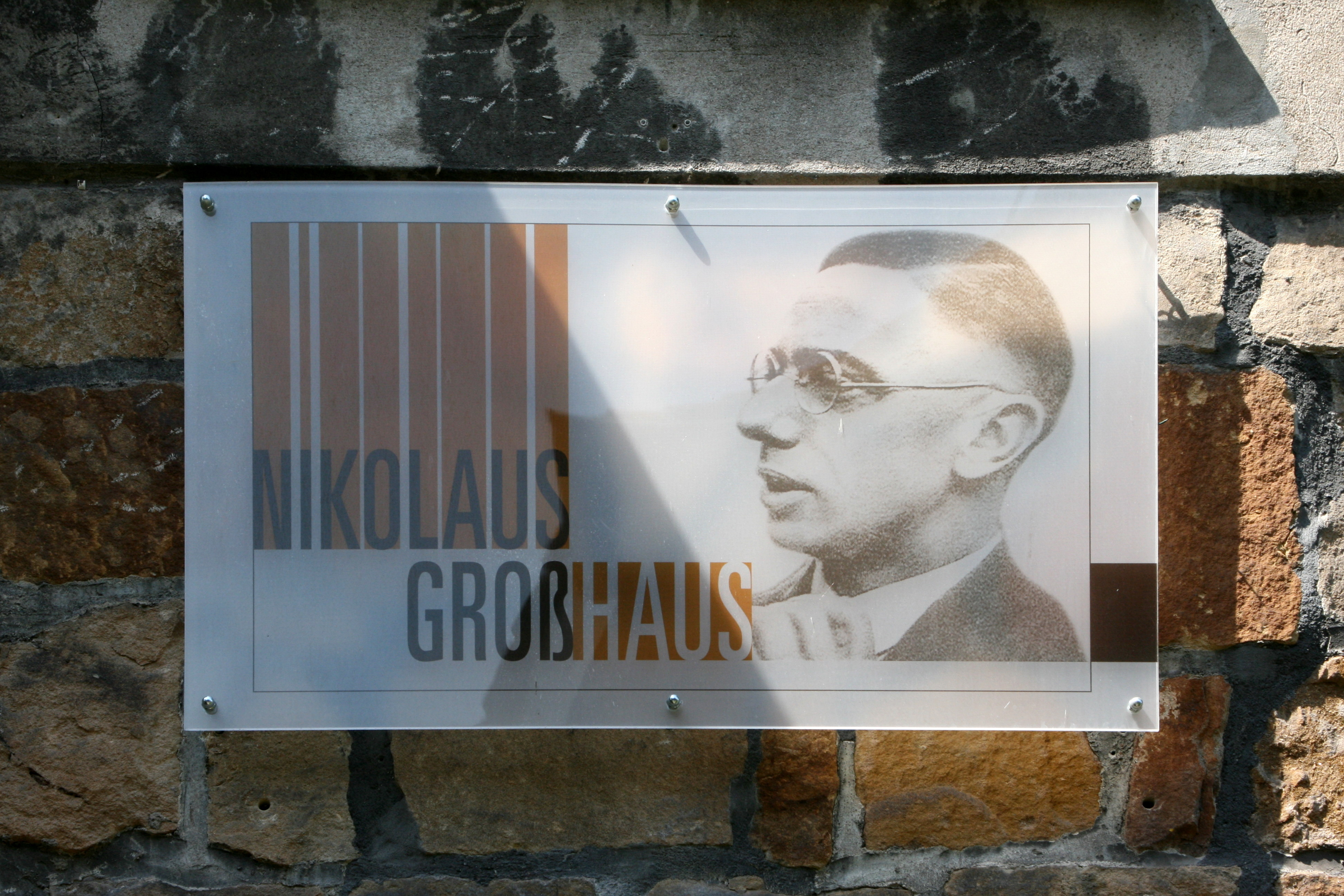
Sign at the Nikolaus-Groß-Haus (museum) in Niederwenigern.

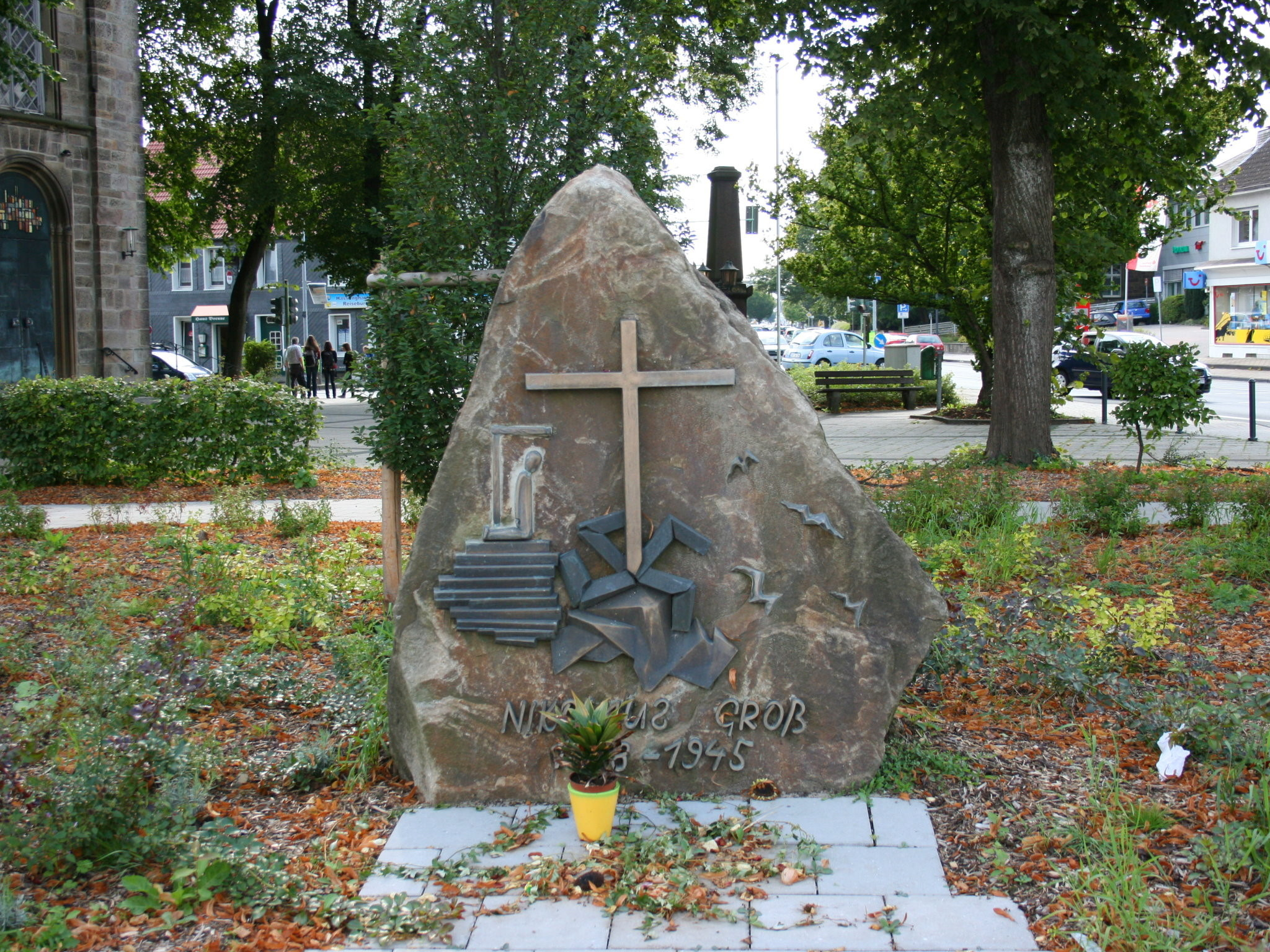
Nikolaus Groß memorial in Sprockhövel-Haßlinghausen.

The beatification process commenced on 19 January 1988 after the Congregation for the Causes of Saints issued the official "nihil obstat" to the cause and titled Gross as a Servant of God; but it would be a decade until the actual diocesan phase of investigation opened in the Essen diocese on 12 November 1996 which later closed on 12 October 1997. The C.C.S. validated the diocesan phase in Rome on 13 November 1998 and received the Positio dossier in 2000 for investigation. The theologians approved the dossier's contents on 25 May 2001 as did the members of the C.C.S. on 3 July 2001. Pope John Paul II confirmed on 7 July 2001 that Gross had been killed "in odium fidei" (in hatred of the faith) and so beatified Gross in Saint Peter's Square on 7 October 2001.

The current postulator for the cause (since 1996) is Dr. Andrea Ambrosi.

There is a museum dedicated to Nikolaus Gross in Niederwenigern. In 1948 a street in Cologne was named in his honor and streets were named after him in places such as Berlin, Dortmund, Bocholt, Vreden, Fulda, Dinslaken, Paderborn, Bergkamen, Dülken, Mönchengladbach, Oberhausen and Essen amongst others. Schools were named after him in Cologne, Essen, Bottrop, Menden, Lebach, and Lünen amongst others. A chapel was dedicated to him on 10 October 2004, and a memorial stone in Gelsenkirchen-Buer on 26 October 2003.

== See also ==
- Chapel of Blessed Nikolaus Groß, Essen Minister
- List of members of the 20 July plot
- Widerstand
