= 1943 =

1943 in various calendars
- Gregorian calendar: 1943; MCMXLIII
- Ab urbe condita: 2696
- Armenian calendar: 1392; ԹՎ ՌՅՂԲ
- Assyrian calendar: 6693
- Baháʼí calendar: 99–100
- Balinese saka calendar: 1864–1865
- Bengali calendar: 1349–1350
- Berber calendar: 2893
- British Regnal year: 7 Geo. 6 – 8 Geo. 6
- Buddhist calendar: 2487
- Burmese calendar: 1305
- Byzantine calendar: 7451–7452
- Chinese calendar: 壬午年 (Water Horse); 4640 or 4433 — to — 癸未年 (Water Goat); 4641 or 4434
- Coptic calendar: 1659–1660
- Discordian calendar: 3109
- Ethiopian calendar: 1935–1936
- Hebrew calendar: 5703–5704
- Hindu calendars
- Vikram Samvat: 1999–2000
- Shaka Samvat: 1864–1865
- Kali Yuga: 5043–5044
- Holocene calendar: 11943
- Igbo calendar: 943–944
- Iranian calendar: 1321–1322
- Islamic calendar: 1361–1363
- Japanese calendar: Shōwa 18 (昭和１８年)
- Javanese calendar: 1873–1874
- Juche calendar: 32
- Julian calendar: Gregorian minus 13 days
- Korean calendar: 4276
- Minguo calendar: ROC 32 民國32年
- Nanakshahi calendar: 475
- Thai solar calendar: 2486
- Tibetan calendar: ཆུ་ཕོ་རྟ་ལོ་ (male Water-Horse); 2069 or 1688 or 916 — to — ཆུ་མོ་ལུག་ལོ་ (female Water-Sheep); 2070 or 1689 or 917

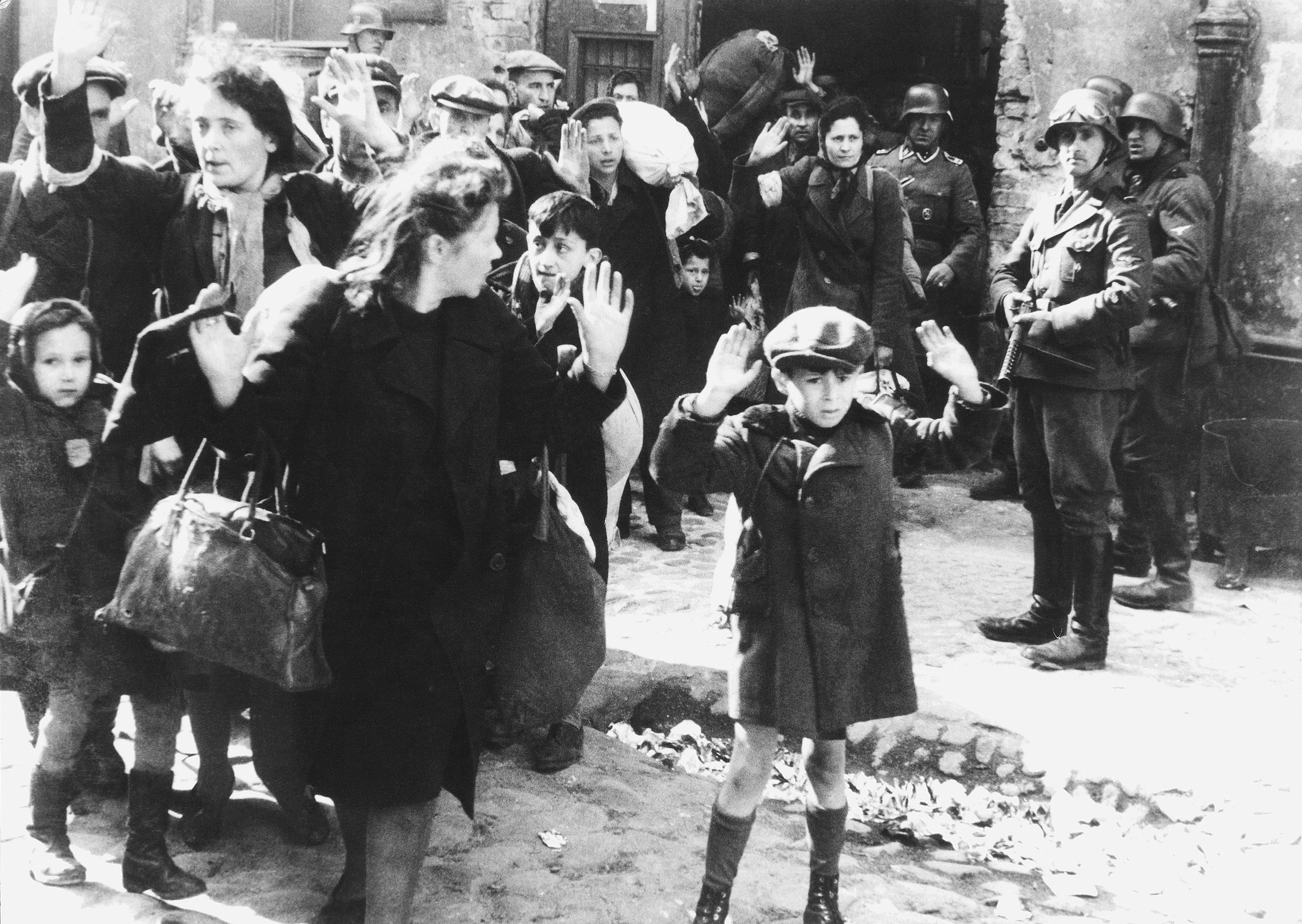
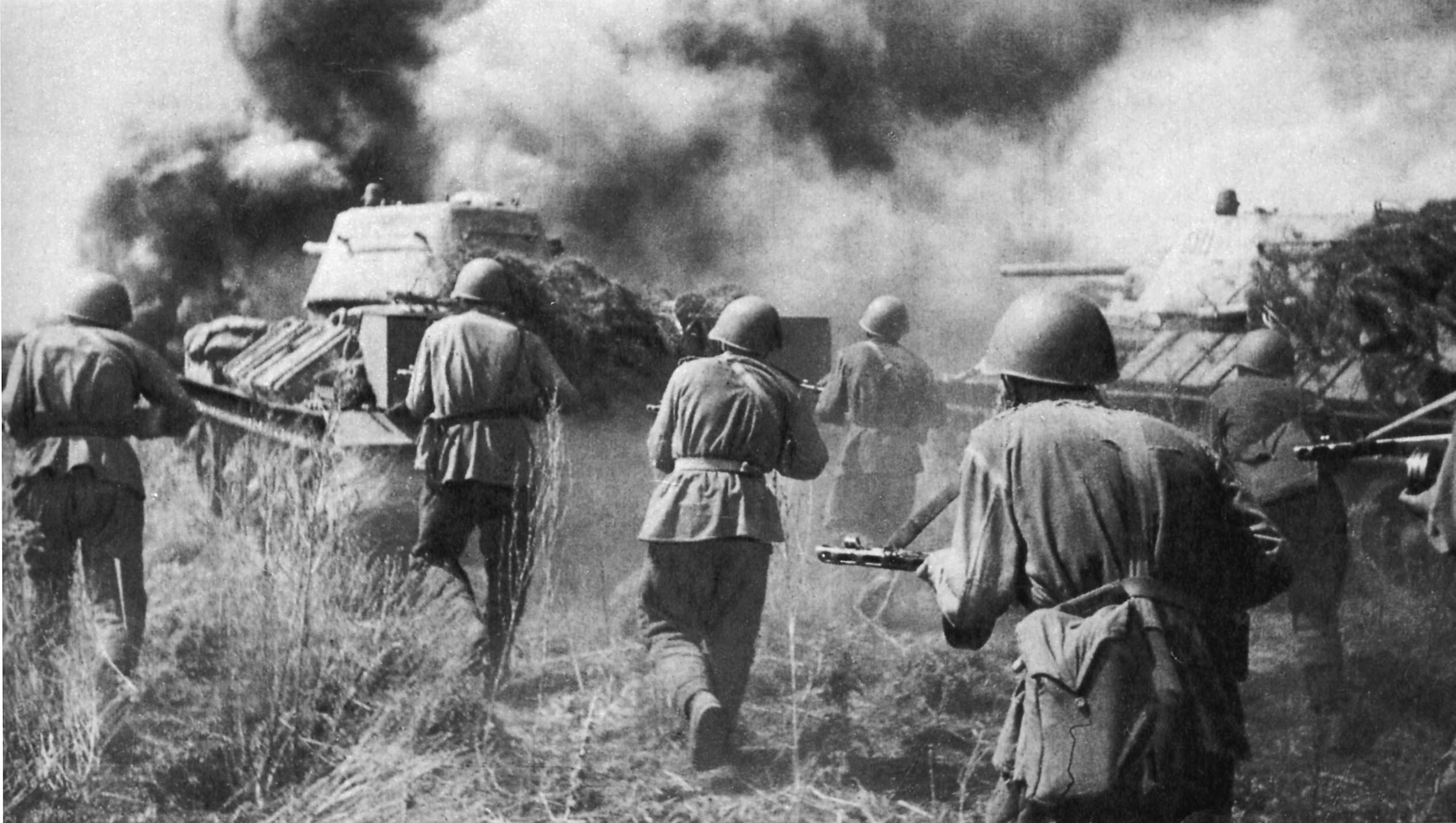
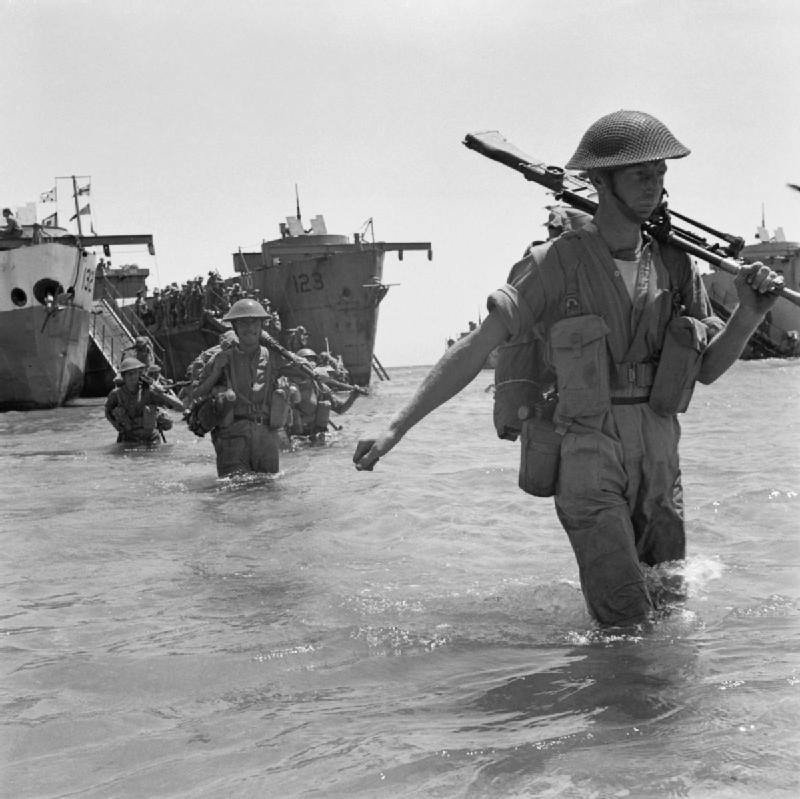
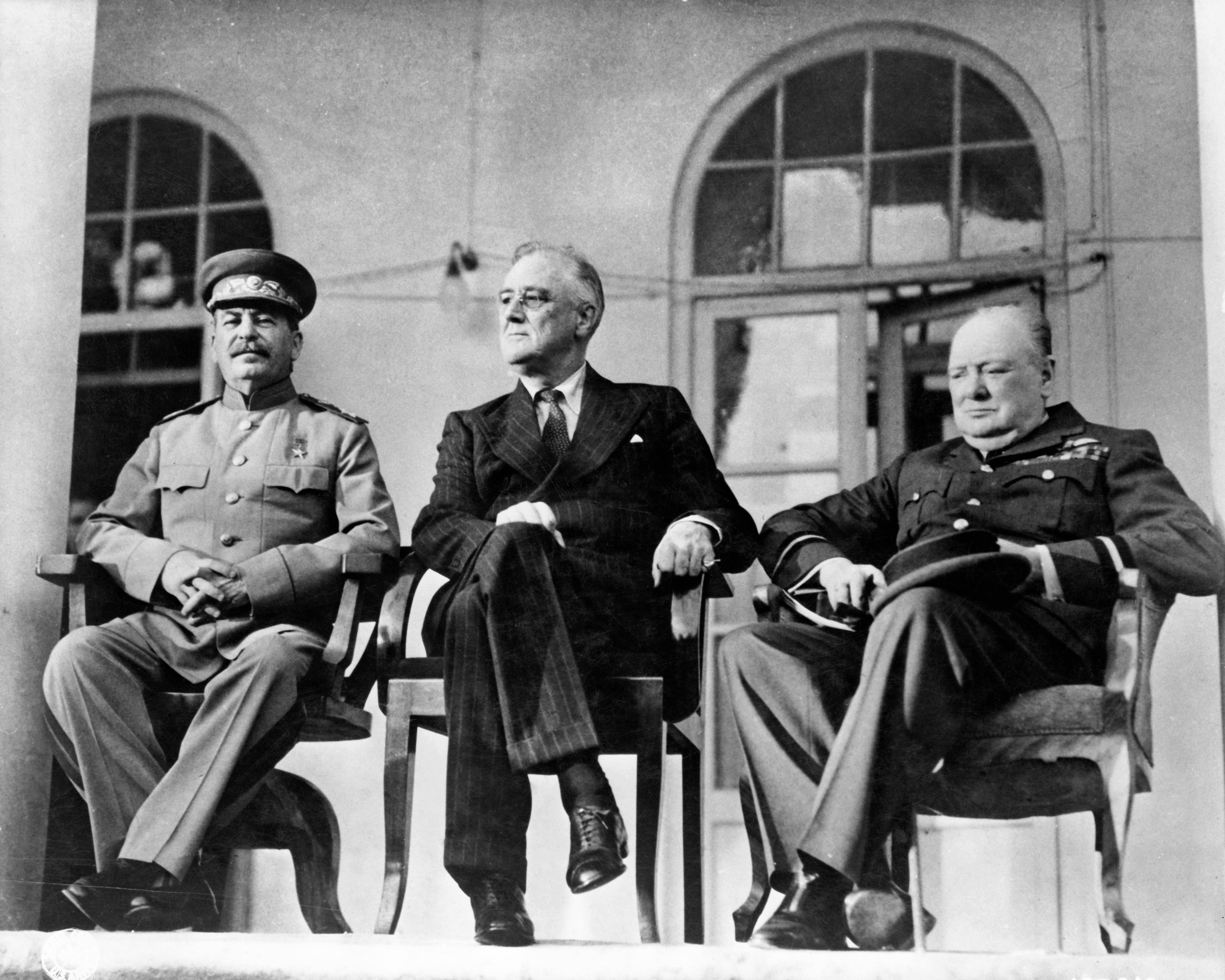
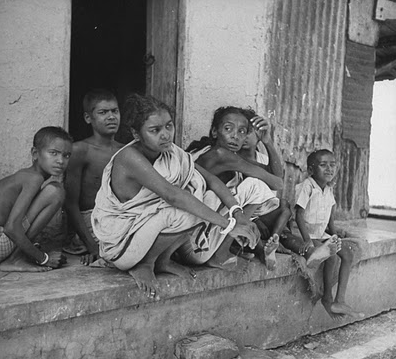
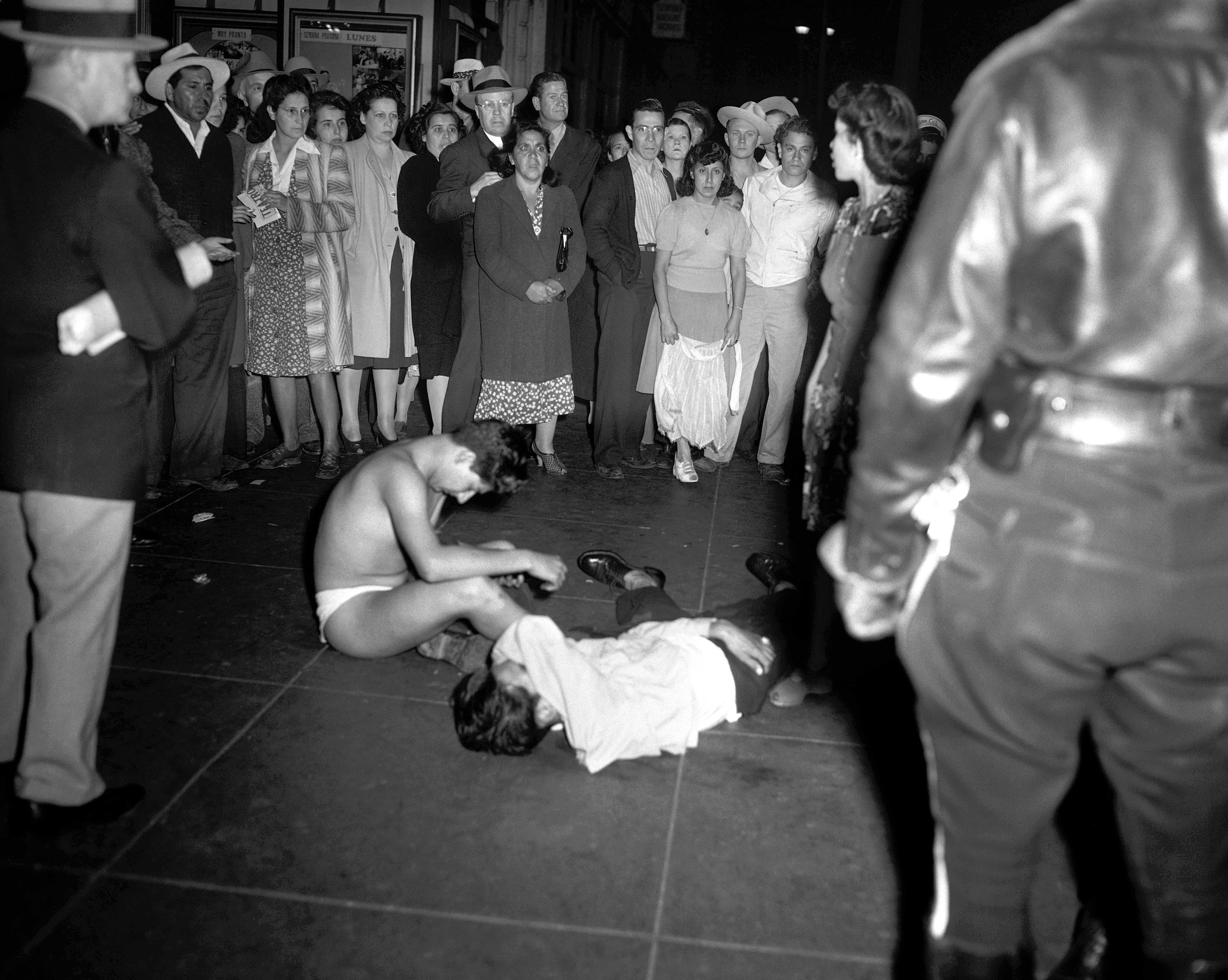
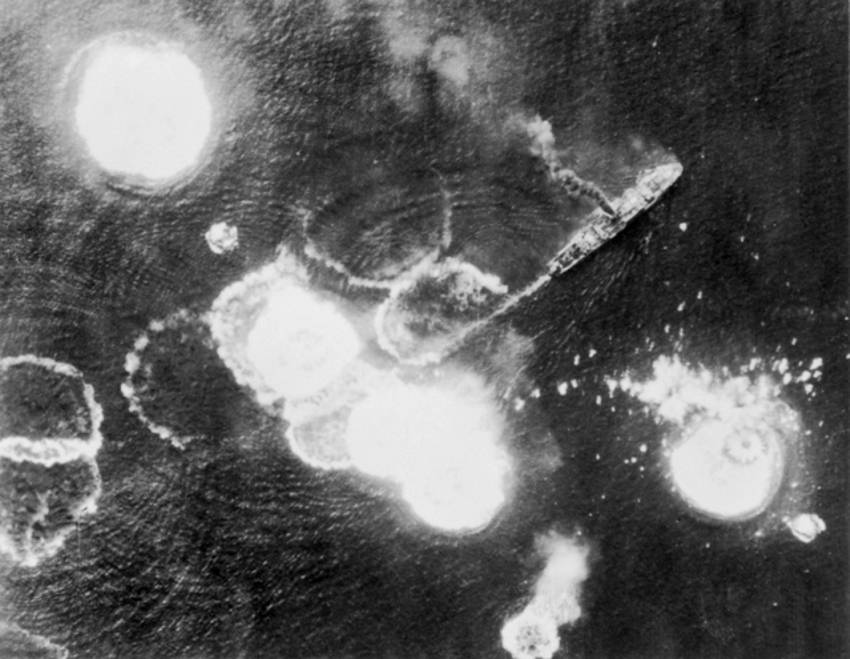
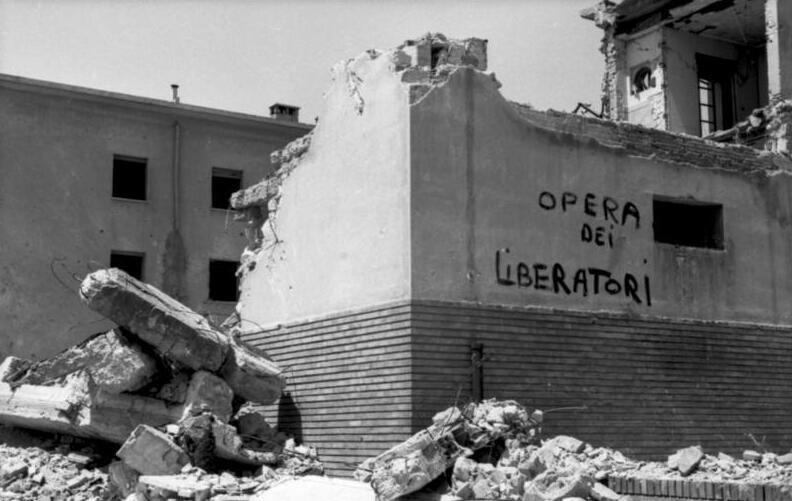
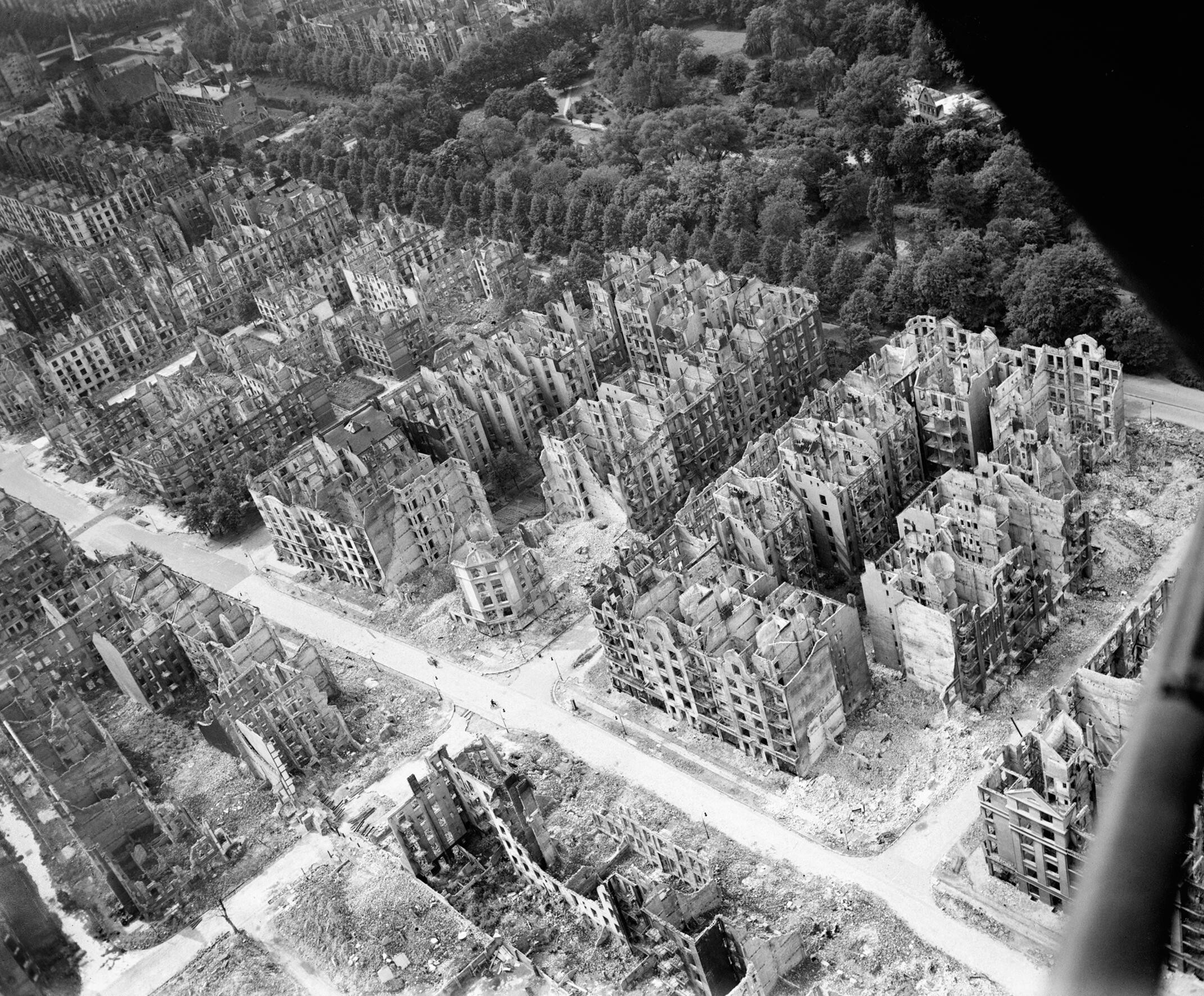
From top to bottom, left to right:
- The Warsaw Ghetto Uprising sees Jewish fighters revolt against Nazi Germany;
- The Battle of Kursk is the largest tank battle in history and a decisive Soviet victory;
- The Allied invasion of Sicily begins, leading to the fall of Benito Mussolini;
- The Tehran Conference brings together Winston Churchill, Franklin D. Roosevelt, and Joseph Stalin to plan Nazi Germany’s defeat;
- The Bengal famine of 1943 kills 2–3 million in British India;
- The Zoot Suit Riots erupt in Los Angeles, highlighting racial tensions;
- The Battle of the Bismarck Sea sees Allied air power destroy a Japanese convoy;
- The Bombing of Rome in World War II causes civilian casualties and historic damage;
- The Bombing of Hamburg in World War II kills tens of thousands and cripples the city’s industry.

1943 (MCMXLIII) was a common year starting on Friday of the Gregorian calendar, the 1943rd year of the Common Era (CE) and Anno Domini (AD) designations, the 943rd year of the 2nd millennium, the 43rd year of the 20th century, and the 4th year of the 1940s decade.

== Events ==
Below, the events of World War II have the "WWII" prefix.

=== January ===
- January 1
  - WWII: The Soviet Union announces that 22 German divisions have been encircled at Stalingrad, with 175,000 killed and 137,650 captured.
  - Disney in the United States releases the anti -Nazi and -Axis propaganda short animated movie Der Fuehrer's Face featuring Donald Duck which later wins Academy Award for Best Animated Short Film.
- January 4 – WWII: Greek-Polish athlete and saboteur Jerzy Iwanow-Szajnowicz is executed by the Germans at Kaisariani.
- January 10 – WWII: Guadalcanal campaign: American forces of the 2nd Marine Division and the 25th Infantry Division begin their assaults on the Galloping Horse and Sea Horse on Guadalcanal. Meanwhile, the Japanese 17th Army makes plans to abandon the island and after fierce resistance withdraws to the west coast of Guadalcanal.
- January 11
  - The United States and United Kingdom revise previously unequal treaty relationships with the Republic of China.
  - Italian-American anarchist Carlo Tresca is assassinated in New York City.
- January 12 – WWII: Landing at Amchitka: American forces make an unopposed landing on Amchitka, an island of the Aleutian Islands, southwest of Alaska. The destroyer USS Worden moves into Constantine Harbor and disembarks a detachment of Alaska Scouts. During a maneuver, a strong current sweeps Worden onto a pinnacle rock that tears up the hull beneath the engine room – leaving the destroyer powerless. Later, Worden gets the order to abandon the ship and suffers the death of 14 Americans before the crew is rescued. After the island is cleared of Japanese, transports land some 2,100 men by the end of the day.
- January 13 – Anti-Nazi protests in Sofia result in 200 arrests and 36 executions.

Charles de Gaulle of the French Resistance meet secretly at the Anfa Hotel in Casablanca, Morocco, to plan the Allied European strategy for the next stage of the war.

- January 15 – WWII: Guadalcanal campaign – Operation Ke: Japanese forces begin to withdraw from Guadalcanal in the Solomon Islands.
- January 16 – Iraq declares war on the Axis powers.
- January 18
  - WWII: Soviet officials announce that the Red Army has broken the Wehrmacht's siege of Leningrad as part of Operation Iskra, opening a narrow land corridor to the city. Georgy Zhukov is promoted to Marshal of the Soviet Union.
  - The first Warsaw Ghetto Uprising begins: several day's engagements with the Germans limits the number of Jews deported at this time.
- January 21 – WWII: Pan Am Flight 1104 – Pan American Airways Martin M-130 flying boat crashes about 7 mi (11 km) southwest of Ukiah, California. All 10 passengers and 9 crew aboard are killed, including Admiral Robert H. English (at this time COMSUBPAC).
- January 22
  - WWII: Battle of Buna–Gona: American and Australian forces secure control of the territory of Papua.
  - The Holocaust: Round up of Marseille begins – Over 4,000 Jews are arrested in Nazi-occupied Marseille as part of "Action Tiger", before being transported to extermination camps in Poland.
- January 23 – WWII: British forces capture Tripoli from the Italians.
- January 27 – WWII: 50 bombers mount the first all American air raid against Germany: Wilhelmshaven is the target.
- January 29 – WWII: Operation Gallop: Russian forces of the Southwestern Front under General Nikolai Vatutin begin an offensive in the Donbas and break through the weak-defended German lines to the west of Voroshilovgrad.
- January 29–30 – WWII: Battle of Rennell Island – The Imperial Japanese Navy resists the United States Navy's attempt to interrupt the withdrawal of Japanese forces from Guadalcanal, in the last major naval battle of the Guadalcanal campaign.
- January 29–31 – WWII: Battle of Wau – Australian forces, with United States support, resist a Japanese advance in the New Guinea campaign.
- January 30 – WWII: German General Friedrich Paulus is promoted to the rank of Field Marshal and instructed to fight to the death in Stalingrad, while Karl Dönitz is promoted to Commander in Chief of the German Navy, replacing Erich Raeder.

=== February ===
- February 2 – WWII: In Russia, the Battle of Stalingrad comes to an end, with the surrender of the German 6th Army.
- February 3 – WWII: The Four Chaplains of the U.S. Army are among those drowned when their ship, Dorchester, is struck by a German torpedo in the North Atlantic.
- February 5 – Lt. General Frank M. Andrews is selected to command the U.S. armies in Europe, while General Dwight D. Eisenhower is assigned command in North Africa. Andrews will serve only 3 months, before dying in an airplane crash.
- February 6 – WWII: Royal Canadian Navy corvette HMCS Louisburg is bombed and sunk off Oran, Algeria by Italian aircraft.
- February 7 – WWII: North Atlantic convoy SC 118 is attacked by U-boats, who sink 8 ships.
- February 9
  - WWII: The Guadalcanal campaign in the Solomon Islands ends with United States forces in command of Guadalcanal, the evacuation of Japanese forces in Operation Ke having been completed two days earlier.
  - The Holocaust: Rue Sainte-Catherine Roundup – The Gestapo arrest 86 Jews in Lyon, 83 of whom are then sent to extermination camps.
- February 10–March 3 – Mohandas Gandhi (under arrest by forces of the British Raj in Pune as a member of the Quit India Movement) keeps a hunger strike to protest his imprisonment.
- February 13 – WWII: Operation Longcloth: Chindit forces (some 3,000 men) of the 77th Indian Infantry Brigade under Brigadier General Orde Wingate cross the Chindwin River and proceed into Burma.
- February 14 – WWII: Rostov-on-Don and Voroshilovgrad in Russia are liberated.
- February 14–17 – WWII: Battle of Sidi Bou Zid: In the Tunisia Campaign, German Panzer divisions commanded by Hans-Jürgen von Arnim are victorious over the United States Army.
- February 16 – WWII: The Soviet Union reconquers Kharkiv, but is later driven out in the Third Battle of Kharkiv.
- February 18
  - In a Sportpalast speech in Berlin, German Propaganda Minister Joseph Goebbels declares a "total war" against the Allies, tacitly admitting that Nazi Germany faces serious dangers.
  - The Nazis arrest the members of the White Rose German Resistance movement.
- February 19–24 – WWII: Battle of Kasserine Pass: German General Erwin Rommel's Afrika Korps and other Axis forces launch an offensive against Allied defenses in Tunisia; it is the United States' first major battle defeat of the war. On February 22, an Anglo-American force halts the German advance near Thala, forcing the Germans to retreat; US bombers harass the retreating Panzers.
- February 20 – The Parícutin volcano begins to appear in a cornfield in Mexico.
- February 21 – WWII: North Atlantic convoy ON 166 is attacked by U-boats, which sink eleven ships.
- February 22
  - WWII: Royal Canadian Navy corvette HMCS Weyburn sinks east of Gibraltar, after being mined.
  - Members of the White Rose are executed in Nazi Germany.
- February 23–24 – Cavan Orphanage Fire: 35 girls and a cook from St Joseph's Orphanage, an industrial school at Cavan, Ireland, are killed in a fire in their dormitories. A subsequent inquiry absolves the Poor Clares of blame.
- February 24 – WWII: First major protest march in Athens against rumours of forced mobilization of Greek workers for work in Germany, resulting in clashes with the Axis occupation forces and collaborationist police. Demonstrators attack the Labour Ministry and burn its files.
- February 28
  - WWII: The funeral of Greece's national poet, Kostis Palamas, turns into a demonstration against the Axis occupation of Greece.
  - WWII: Operation Gunnerside: 6 Norwegians, led by Joachim Rønneberg, successfully attack the heavy water plant at Vemork.

=== March ===
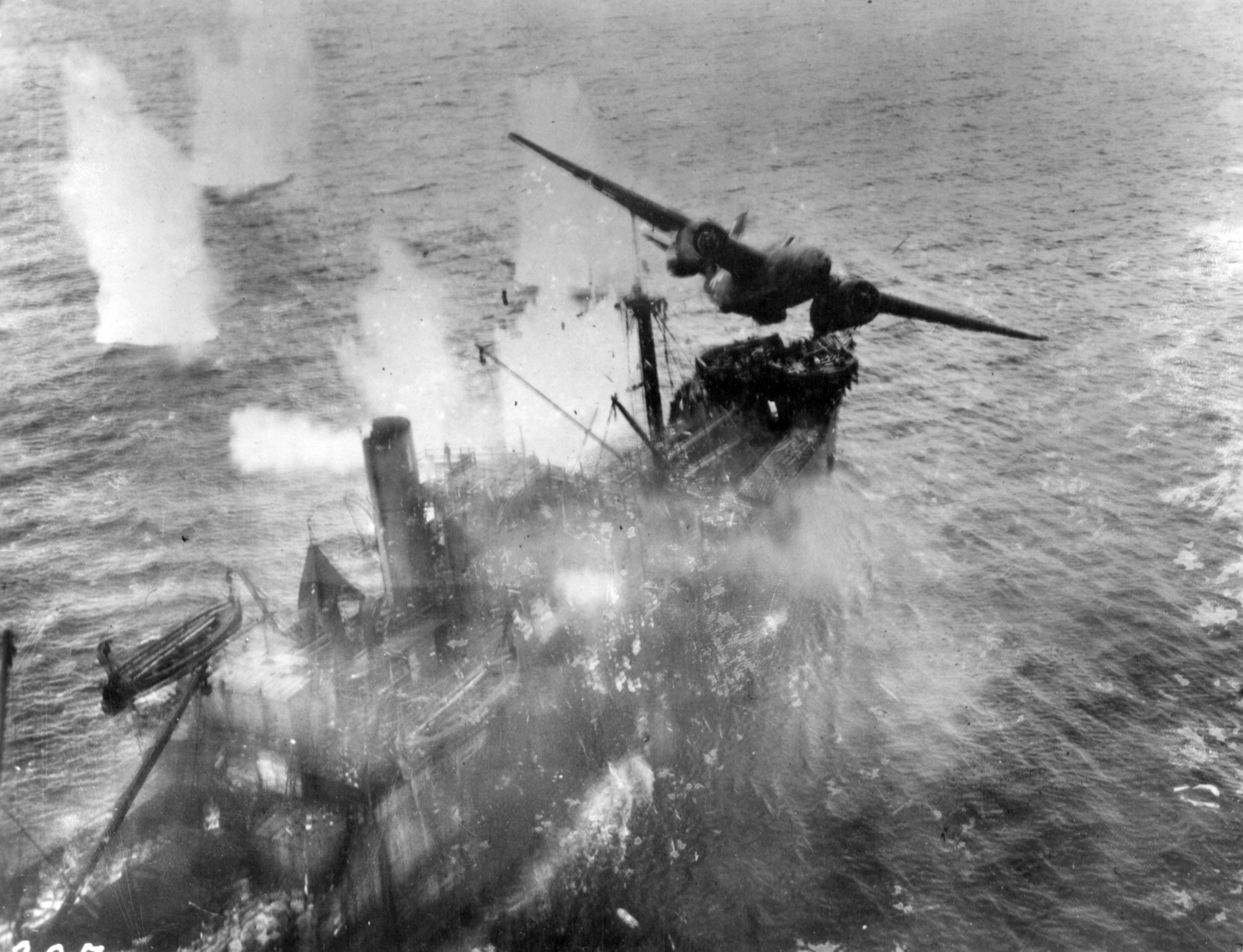
A low level attack on a Japanese ship during the Battle of the Bismarck Sea

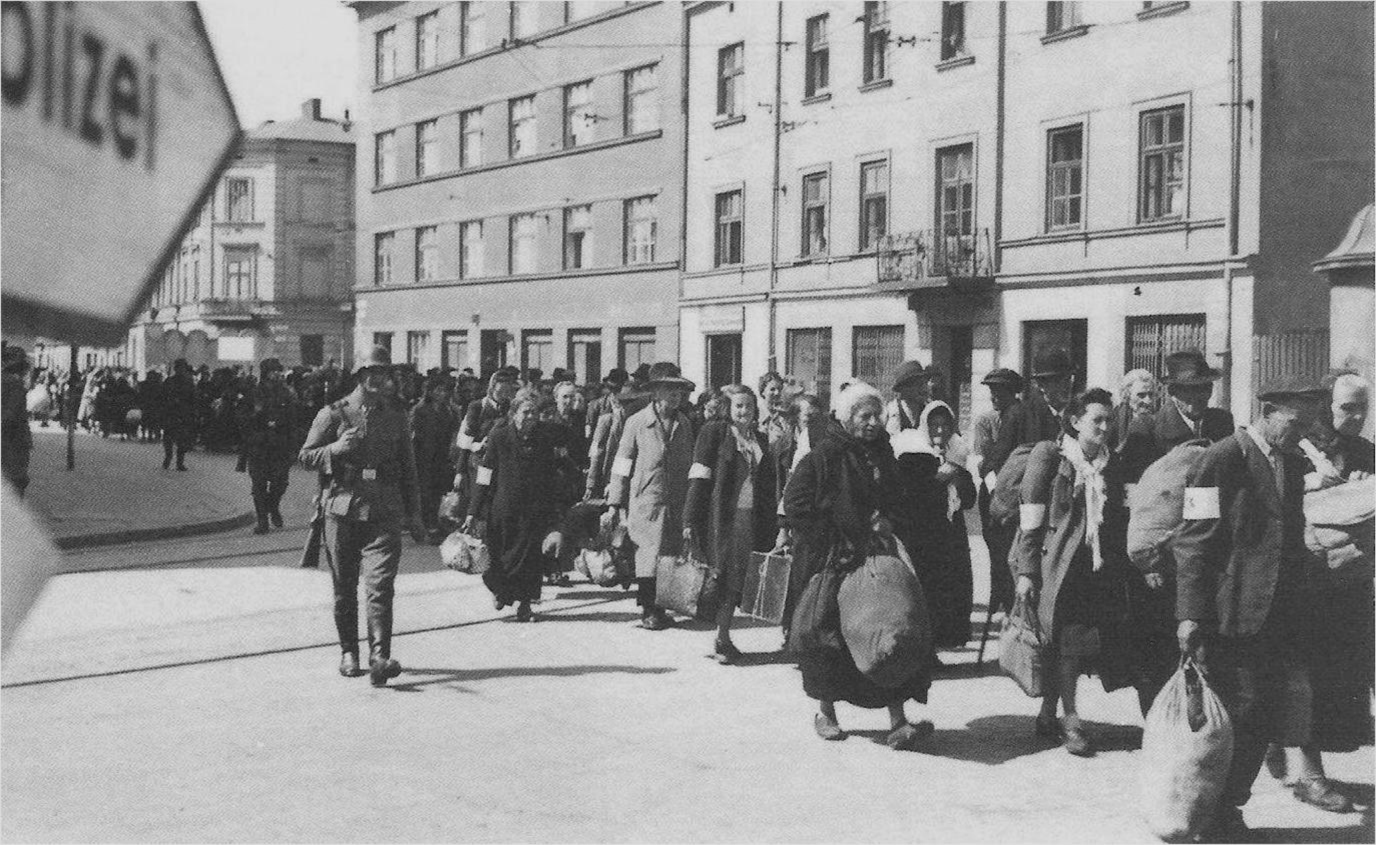
Jewish prisoners being deported from the Kraków Ghetto

- March – Exiled French aviator Antoine de Saint-Exupéry's self-illustrated children's novella, The Little Prince, is published in New York City, the all-time best-selling book originating in French.
- March–December – History of computing hardware: British prototype Mark I Colossus computer is constructed (the world's first totally electronic programmable computing device) to assist in cryptanalysis of German signals at Bletchley Park.
- March 1 – Heinz Guderian becomes Inspector-General of the Armoured Troops for the German Army.
- March 1–2 – WWII: Koriukivka massacre – 6,700 inhabitants of Koriukivka are murdered in Ukraine, by a German SS unit.
- March 2 – WWII: Battle of the Bismarck Sea – United States and Australian forces sink Japanese convoy ships, then strafe survivors in the water.
- March 3 – 173 people are killed in a crush while trying to enter an air-raid shelter at Bethnal Green, London.
- March 4
  - As part of The Holocaust in Bulgarian-occupied Greece, almost all Jews in the region are rounded up to be taken to Treblinka extermination camp.
  - The 15th Academy Awards ceremony is held in Los Angeles. Mrs. Miniver wins the Best Picture Award.
- March 4–6 – WWII: Battle of Fardykambos – Greek partisans and armed civilians force the surrender of an Italian army battalion.
- March 5
  - WWII: General strike and protest march in Athens against rumours of forced mobilization of Greek workers for work in Germany, resulting in clashes with the Axis occupation forces and collaborationist police. The decree is withdrawn on the next day.
  - The Gloster Meteor, the first Allied jet fighter, makes its first flight, in England.
- March 9–10 – WWII: North Atlantic convoy SC 121 is attacked by U-boats sinking seven ships.
- March 9 – Şükrü Saracoğlu forms the new government of Turkey (14th government; Şükrü Saracoğlu had served twice as a prime minister).
- March 10 – Banco Bradesco is founded in Marília, São Paulo, Brazil.
- March 12
  - WWII: Italian occupation of Greece: The Italian occupying forces abandon the town of Karditsa to the partisans. On the same day, an Italian motorized column razes the village of Tsaritsani, burning 360 of its 600 houses and shooting 40 civilians.
  - Aaron Copland's Fanfare for the Common Man is premiered by the Cincinnati Symphony Orchestra.
- March 13 – The Holocaust: Nazi German forces liquidate the Jews of the Kraków Ghetto, in occupied Poland.
- March 14 – WWII: British submarine HMS Thunderbolt is sunk off Sicily by an Italian corvette, the second time this vessel has been lost with all hands.
- March 15 – WWII:
  - Italian submarine Leonardo da Vinci sinks Canadian Pacific liner RMS Empress of Canada off Sierra Leone. Nearly half of the 392 fatalities are Italian prisoners of war.
  - German forces recapture Kharkiv after four days of house-to-house fighting against Soviet troops, ending the month-long Third Battle of Kharkiv.
- March 16 – WWII: Battle of the Mareth Line: Allied forces of the British 8th Army under General Bernard Montgomery launch an offensive against the Mareth Line held by the Italo-German 1st Army.
- March 16–19 – WWII: 22 ships from Convoys HX 229/SC 122 and one U-boat are sunk in the largest North Atlantic U-boat "wolfpack" attack of the war.
- March 17 (Saint Patrick's Day) – Éamon de Valera, Taoiseach of the Republic of Ireland, makes the speech "The Ireland That We Dreamed Of", commonly called the "comely maidens" speech, in Dublin Castle.
- March 22 – WWII: Khatyn massacre – The entire population of Khatyn, Belarus is burnt alive by German occupation forces.
- March 23 – The drugs Vicodin and Lortab are first produced in Germany.
- March 26 – WWII: Battle of the Komandorski Islands: In the Aleutian Islands, the battle begins when United States Navy forces intercept Japanese troops attempting to reinforce a garrison at Kiska. During the engagement, heavy cruiser USS Salt Lake City is severely damaged by Japanese cruiser gunfire. Lasting for three and a half hours, it will be the longest continuous gunnery duel in modern naval history.
- March 27 – WWII: British Royal Navy escort carrier HMS Dasher (D37) is destroyed by an accidental explosion in the Firth of Clyde, killing 379 of the crew of 528.
- March 28 – In Italy the transport Caterina Costa, full of weapons and ammunition, explodes in the port of Naples, killing 600.

=== April ===
- April 13 – WWII: Radio Berlin announces the discovery by Wehrmacht of mass graves of Poles killed by Soviets in the Katyn massacre.
- April 19
  - History of lysergic acid diethylamide: Albert Hofmann self-administers the psychedelic drug LSD (which he first synthesized in 1938) for the first time in history and records the details of his experience.
  - The Holocaust: The Warsaw Ghetto Uprising begins when Nazi troops enter the Warsaw Ghetto to round up remaining Jews.
- April 21 – WWII:
  - Aberdeen, Scotland, experiences its worst bombing, with 125 people killed.
  - The first German Tiger I tank is captured in North Africa by British forces.
- April 25 – Easter occurs on the latest possible date (last time 1886; next time 2038) in the Western Christian Church.
- April 27 – The U.S. Federal Writers' Project ceases operation.

=== May ===
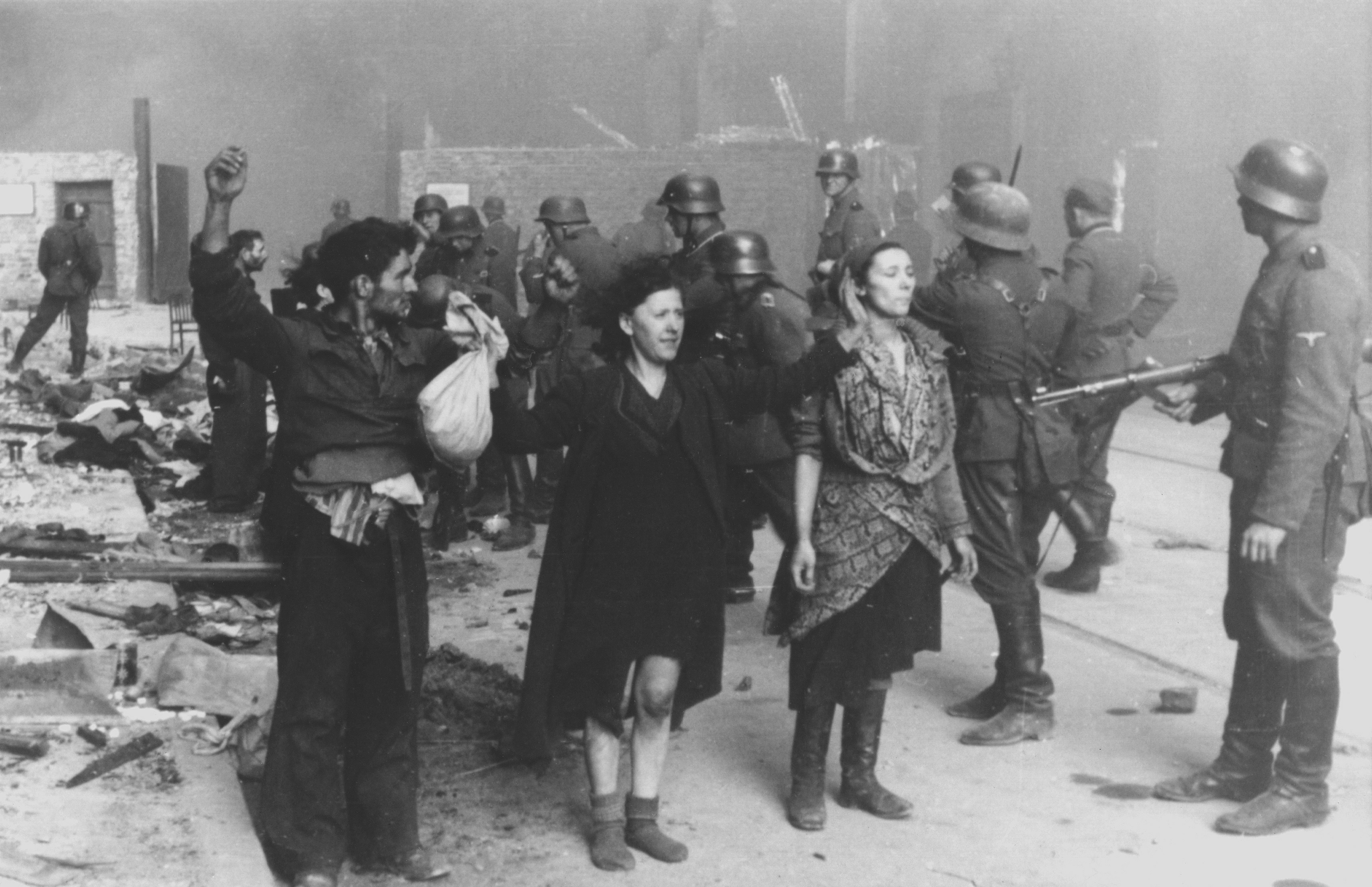
This photograph, from the Stroop Report, shows captured fighters in the Warsaw Ghetto Uprising.

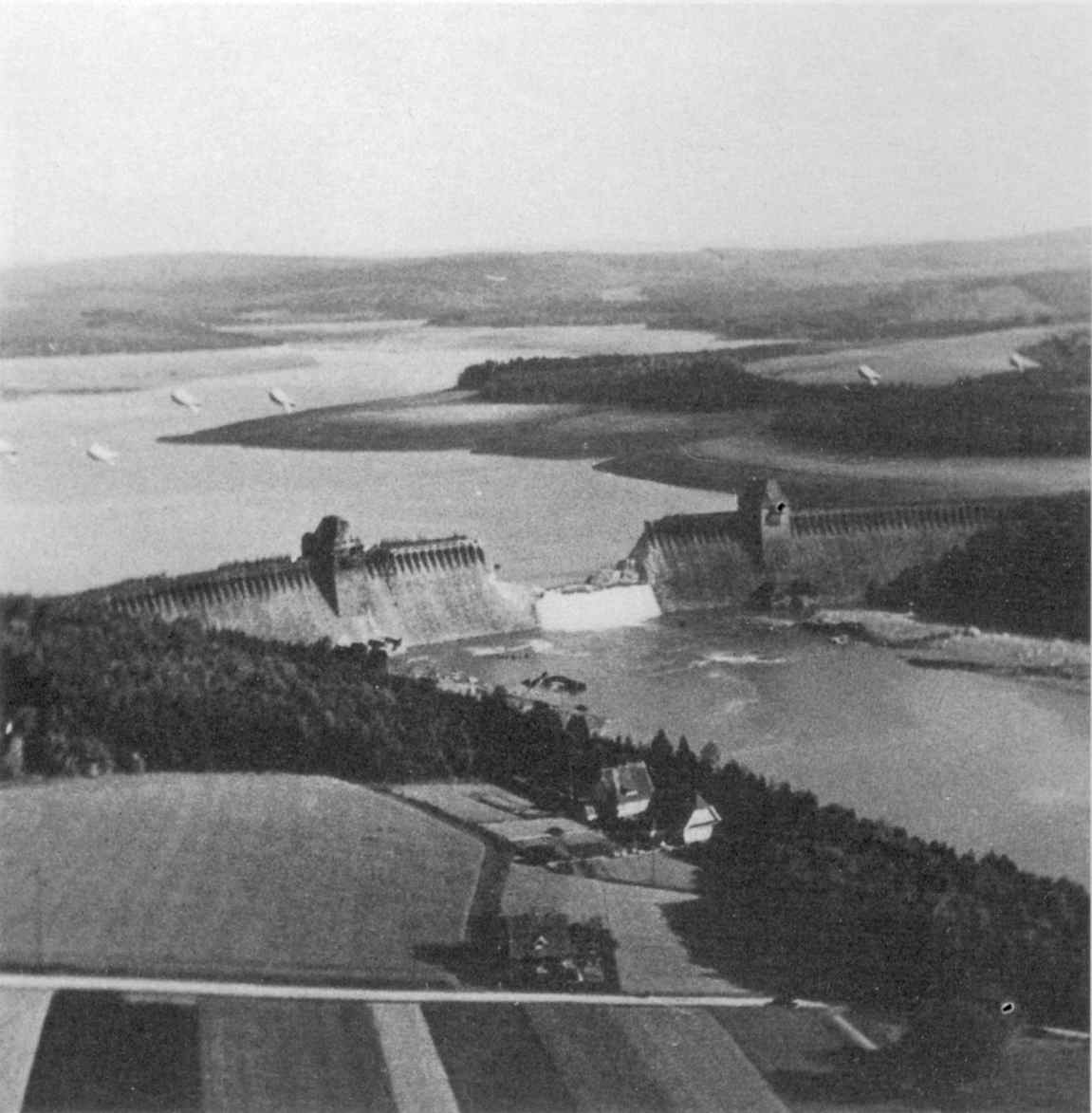
The Möhne Dam breached following Operation Chastise, carried out by the "Dambusters" of the RAF.

- May 6 – WWII: Six U-boats are sunk, after sinking 12 ships from Convoy ONS 5, in the last major North Atlantic U-boat "wolfpack" attack of the war.
- May 9–12 – Japanese troops carry out the Changjiao massacre in Changjiao, Hunan, China.
- May 11 – WWII: American troops invade Attu in the Aleutian Islands, in an attempt to expel occupying Japanese forces.
- May 12 – The Third Washington Conference ("Trident") begins in Washington, D.C., with Franklin D. Roosevelt and Winston Churchill taking part.
- May 13 – WWII: German Afrika Korps and Italian troops in North Africa surrender to Allied forces.
- May 14 – WWII:
  - Australian Hospital Ship Centaur is sunk off the coast of Queensland by Japanese submarine I-177, killing 268 of the 332 medical personnel and civilian crew aboard.
  - The 358th Bombardment Squadron, 303d Bombardment Group B-17F Hell's Angels is the first USAAF bomber to complete 25 missions.
- May 15 – WWII:
  - Operation Schwarz: Axis forces begin a joint offensive, with the aim of destroying the Yugoslav Partisans, in south-eastern Bosnia. During the offensive, some 7,500 partisans are killed or wounded.
  - The Comintern is dissolved in Moscow.
- May 16–17 – WWII: Operation Chastise (the 'Dambuster Raid') takes place: No. 617 Squadron RAF use bouncing bombs to breach German dams in the Ruhr Valley.
- May 16 – Holocaust: The Warsaw Ghetto Uprising ends. 13,000 Jews have been killed in the ghetto and almost all the remaining 50,000 residents are deported to Majdanek and Treblinka extermination camps.
- May 17 – WWII:
  - The United States Army contracts with the University of Pennsylvania's Moore School to develop the computer ENIAC.
  - The Memphis Belle's crew becomes the first aircrew in the 8th Air Force to complete its 25-mission tour of duty. The aircraft and crew are the first to return to the U.S. intact for a War Bond drive.
- May 19 – Winston Churchill addresses a joint session of the United States Congress.
- May 24 – WWII: Admiral Karl Dönitz orders most U-boats to withdraw from the Atlantic Ocean. Allied anti-submarine tactics are causing huge losses and only 41 U-boats are operational for duty.
- May 27 – The port city of Maizuru is founded in Japan.
- May 29 – Norman Rockwell's illustration of 'Rosie the Riveter' first appears, on the cover of The Saturday Evening Post.
- May 30 – WWII: Chinese 6th War Area commander Chen Cheng orders a large counteroffensive in Hubei Province and pushes the Japanese forces of the 11th Army back at multiple locations.

=== June ===
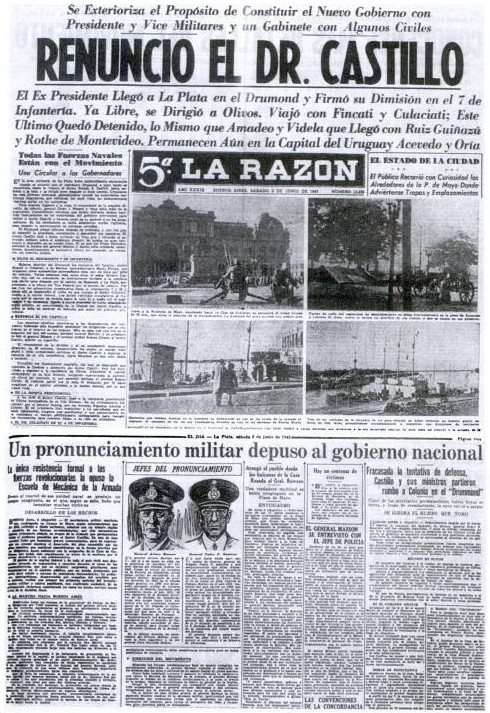
A newspaper announcing the beginning of the 1943 Argentine Revolution.

- June 1 – BOAC Flight 777, a scheduled passenger flight, is shot down over the Bay of Biscay by German Junkers Ju 88s; all 17 persons aboard perish, including actor Leslie Howard.
- June 3
  - The Zoot Suit Riots erupt between military personnel and Mexican-American youths in East Los Angeles.
  - The French Committee of National Liberation (Comité Français de Libération Nationale, CFLN) is formed with headquarters in Algiers and Generals Charles de Gaulle and Henri Giraud as co-presidents.
- June 4 – A military coup d'état in Argentina ousts Ramón Castillo.
- June 8 – WWII: Japanese battleship Mutsu is destroyed by an accidental magazine explosion, in Hashirajima anchorage.
- June 8–9 – WWII: Battle of Porta: The Royal Italian Army is defeated by the Greek People's Liberation Army.
- June 20–23 – The Detroit race riot of 1943 in the United States kills 34 people (25 African Americans, 9 whites), wounds hundreds more and damages and destroys property worth millions.
- June 21 – WWII: As part of Operation Animals, British Special Operations Executive saboteurs destroy the railway bridge over the Asopos River in "Operation Washing", and guerrillas of the Greek People's Liberation Army ambush and destroy a German convoy at the Battle of Sarantaporos.
- June 22 – WWII: The U.S. Army 45th Infantry Division lands in North Africa, prior to training at Arzew, French Morocco.
- June 30
  - The United States Civilian Conservation Corps is abolished.
  - WWII: The New Georgia campaign begins in the Solomon Islands, an Allied offensive against the Japanese forces stationed there.
- June (late) – The Holocaust: The last trainload of Jewish prisoners is moved from Bełżec extermination camp in occupied Poland (for gassing at Sobibór), and for the remainder of the year the Nazis make efforts to obliterate the site.

=== July ===
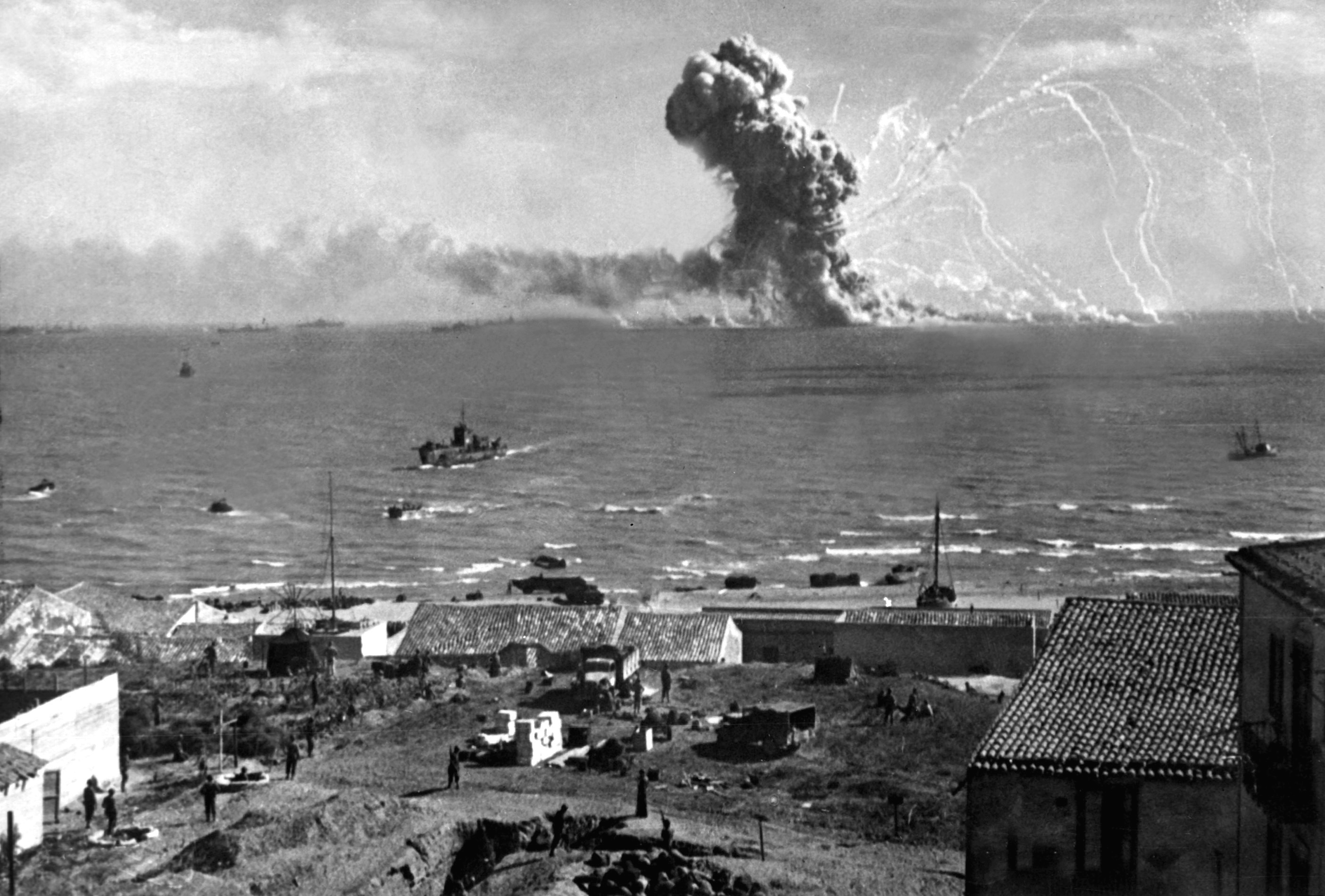
The U.S. Liberty ship SS Robert Rowan explodes during the Allied invasion of Sicily, July 11, 1943.

The bombing of Hamburg during 1943.

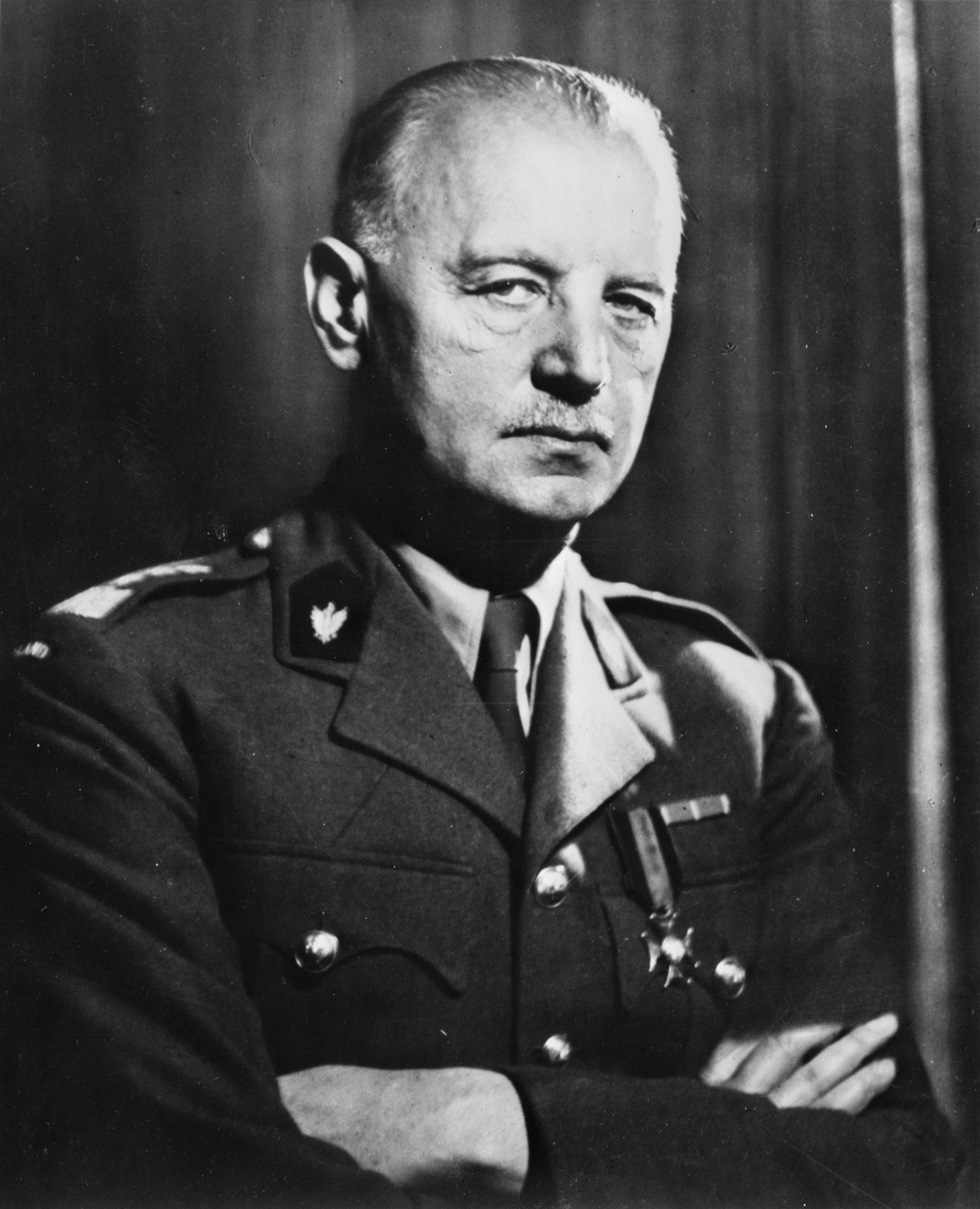
Wladyslaw Sikorski, Polish military and political leader of the Polish government in exile during World War 2

- July 1 – The United States Women's Army Corps (WAC) is converted to full status.
- July 4 – 1943 Gibraltar B-24 crash: The aircraft carrying General Władysław Sikorski, Prime Minister of the Polish government-in-exile, crashes, killing him and 15 others, leading to a lasting controversy over the circumstances.
- July 5 – WWII:
  - Nazi Germany commences Operation Citadel. It will eventually lead to the Battle of Kursk, the largest tank battle in history.
  - A fleet sets sail for the Allied invasion of Sicily.
  - The National Bands Agreement is concluded in Greece.
- July 6 – WWII: Americans and Japanese fight the Battle of Kula Gulf off Kolombangara.
- July 10
  - (0245 GMT (4:45 a.m. local time)) – WWII: Allied invasion of Sicily – The Allied invasion of Axis-controlled Europe begins, with landings on the island of Sicily off mainland Italy by the Seventh United States Army and the British Eighth Army, including the 1st Canadian Infantry Division.
  - The Holocaust: Jedwabne pogrom – At least 340 Polish Jews are marched to a local barn, locked inside and subsequently burned to death.
- July 11 – WWII:
  - United States Army forces make an assault on Piano Lupo, just outside Gela, Sicily.
  - Massacres of Poles in Volhynia and Eastern Galicia by the Ukrainian Insurgent Army within the Reichskommissariat Ukraine (Volhynia) peak.
- July 12 – WWII: Main engagement of the Battle of Prokhorovka – The Wehrmacht and the Red Army fight to a draw in one of the largest tank battles in military history.
- July 17 – WWII:
  - Soviet forces of the Southwestern- and Southern Front strike hard at the German defenses of the 9th Army under General Walter Model during Operation Kutuzov.
  - Krasowo-Częstki massacre: The village of Krasowo-Częstki in Nazi-occupied Poland is completely burned and 257 of its inhabitants, mostly women and children, murdered by the Ordnungspolizei and SS in retaliation for German deaths in a skirmish with Polish partisans nearby.
- July 19 – WWII: Rome is bombed by the Allies, for the first time in the war.
- July 24 – WWII: Operation Gomorrah: British and Canadian aeroplanes bomb Hamburg by night; American planes bomb the city by day. By the end of the operation in November, 9,000 tons of explosives will have killed more than 42,000 people and destroyed 280,000 buildings.

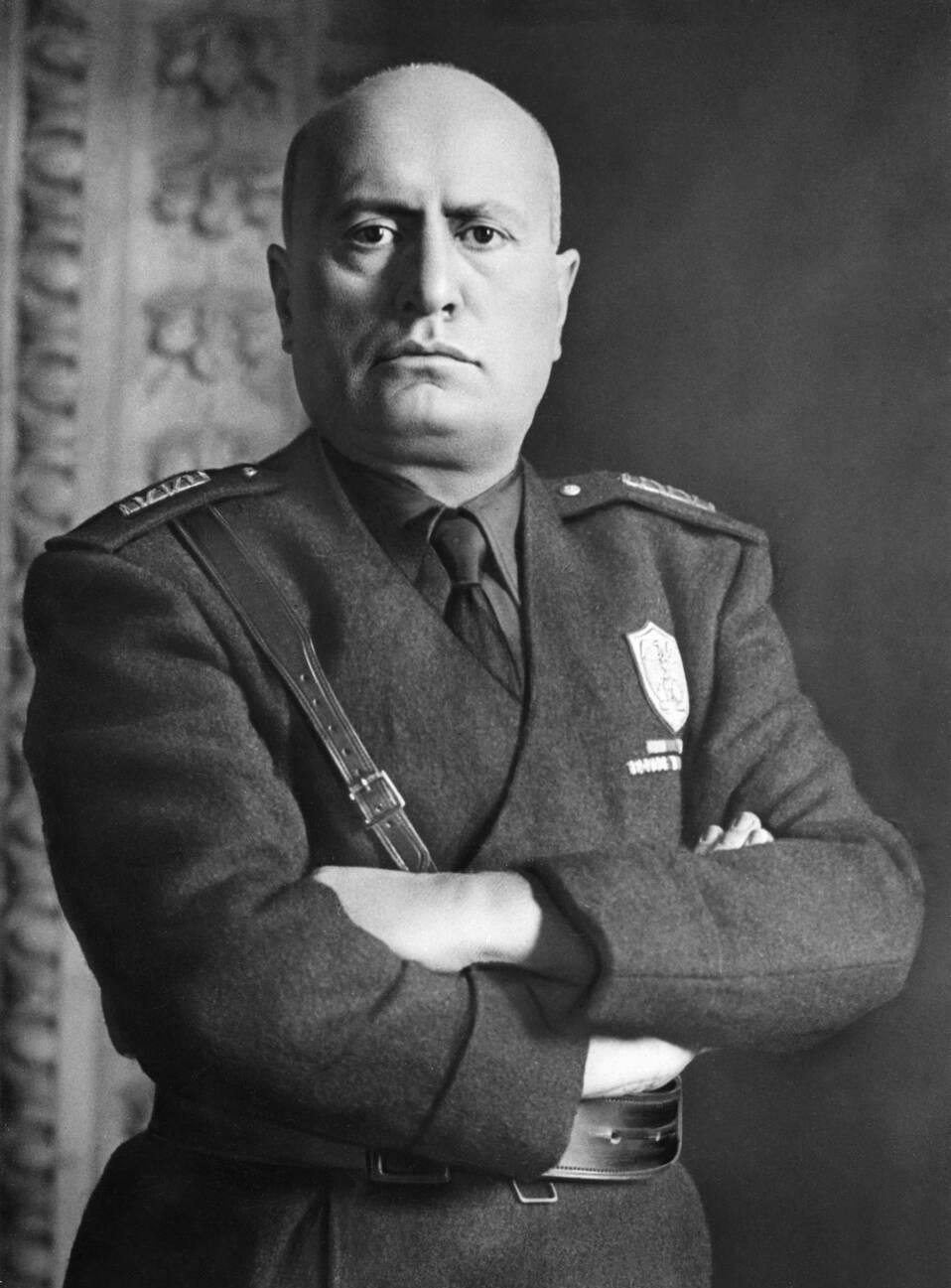
Mussolini

- July 25 – Benito Mussolini, Fascist Prime Minister of Italy since 1922, is arrested after the Grand Council of Fascism withdraws its support. "Il Duce" is replaced by General Pietro Badoglio.

=== August ===
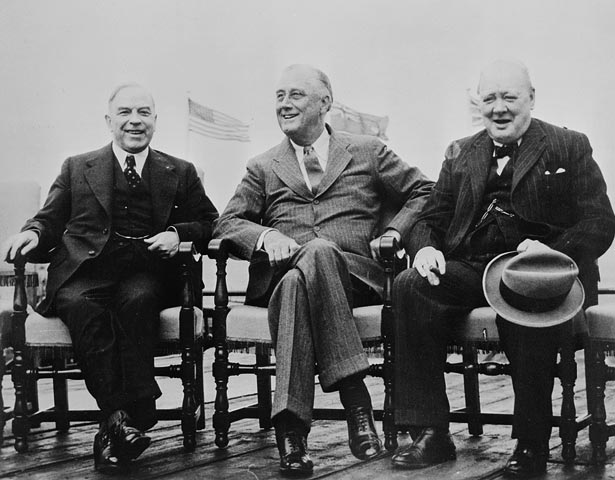
Mackenzie King, Franklin D. Roosevelt and Winston Churchill at the 1943 Quebec Conference.

- August 1 – Operation Tidal Wave: 177 B-24 Liberator bombers from the U.S. Army Air Force bomb oil refineries at Ploiești, Romania.
- August 2 – WWII: John F. Kennedy's PT boat PT-109 is run down by Japanese destroyer Amagiri.
- August 3 – Patton slapping incident: U.S. General George S. Patton Jr. slaps a soldier suffering from battle fatigue, at a field hospital in Sicily. On August 10, he slaps another soldier suffering from the same condition.
- August 4 – WWII: The aircraft carrier USS Intrepid (CV-11) is launched at Newport News, Virginia.
- August 5 – WWII:
  - United States Women Airforce Service Pilots (WASPs) are formed, consolidating the Women's Auxiliary Ferrying Squadron (WAFS) and Women Airforce Service Pilots (WFTD).
  - John F. Kennedy and crew are found by Solomon Islands coastwatchers Biuku Gasa and Eroni Kumana, with their dugout canoe.
- August 6 – WWII: Battle of Vella Gulf: Americans defeat a Japanese convoy off Kolombangara, as the U.S. Army drives the Japanese out of Munda airfield on New Georgia.
- August 11–17 – WWII: Operation Lehrgang: German and Italian forces evacuate from Sicily to the Italian mainland. The evacuation includes some 40,000 Wehrmacht troops, 9,000 vehicles, 30 tanks, and 90 heavy guns. Also, a total of 62,000 Italian troops are successfully evacuated. Despite Allied air attacks, losses are very low due to sufficient Axis anti-aircraft coverage.
- August 14
  - WWII: Rome is declared an open city by the Italian government, with Italy offering to demilitarize the capital, in return for an Allied agreement not to bomb the city further.
  - The Quadrant Conference begins in Quebec City; Canadian Prime Minister MacKenzie King meets with Winston Churchill and Franklin D. Roosevelt.
- August 17 – WWII:
  - The Seventh U.S. Army, under General George S. Patton, meets the Eighth British Army under Field Marshal B. L. Montgomery in Messina, Sicily, completing the Allied invasion of Sicily.
  - Operation Hydra: The British Royal Air Force sets out to bomb the Peenemünde Army Research Center, to disrupt the German V-weapons programme.
- August 21 – 1943 Australian federal election: John Curtin's Labor government defeats the Country/UAP Coalition, led by former Prime Minister Arthur Fadden. Labor achieves its greatest ever electoral result, including winning every seat (except one) outside of the eastern states. Notably, this election marked the first time that a woman has been elected to both the Senate and the House of Representatives. Fadden will step down from the Opposition leadership, handing it over to Robert Menzies, who will go on to dissolve the UAP and form the Liberal Party shortly after.
- August 23 – WWII: The Battle of Kursk ends, with a strategic defeat for the German forces.
- August 24 – Heinrich Himmler is named Reichsminister of the Interior in Germany.
- August 26 – WWII: Louis Mountbatten is named Supreme Allied Commander for Southeast Asia.
- August 28 – WWII: King Boris III of Bulgaria dies under suspicious circumstances; his 6-year-old son, Simeon II, ascends to the throne.
- August 29 – WWII: Occupation of Denmark – Germany dissolves the Danish government, after it refuses to deal with a wave of strikes and disturbances to the satisfaction of the German authorities.

=== September ===
- September 3 – WWII: Allied invasion of Italy
  - Armistice of Cassibile: The Kingdom of Italy surrenders to the Allies in a document signed on Sicily but not made public at this time.
  - Operation Baytown: Mainland Italy is invaded by Allied forces under General Bernard Montgomery, for the first time in the war.
- September 5 – WWII: US landing at Nadzab: The 503rd Parachute Regiment under Colonel George Jones lands and occupies Nadzab, just east of the port city of Lae, in northeastern Papua New Guinea.
- September 7 – Gulf Hotel fire: A fire at the Gulf Hotel in Houston, Texas kills 55.
- September 8
  - WWII: United States General Dwight D. Eisenhower publicly announces the surrender of Italy to the Allies.
  - WWII: Frascati air raid: The USAAF bombs the German General Headquarters for the Mediterranean zone.
  - WWII: The city of Donetsk (the capital of Donbas) is liberated by Soviet forces as a part of the successful Donbas operation.
  - The first classes commence at Grace University in Omaha, Nebraska.
- September 9
  - Bertolt Brecht's play Life of Galileo (German: Leben des Galilei) receives its first theatrical production, at the Schauspielhaus Zürich.
  - WWII: Operation Avalanche: 170,000 British and American troops land near Salerno.
- September 12 – WWII: Gran Sasso raid – German paratroopers rescue Mussolini from imprisonment, in Unternehmen Eiche ("Operation Oak").
- September 16 – WWII: Salerno Mutiny – Soldiers of the British Army's X Corps refuse postings to new units.
- September 17 – WWII: Villefranche-de-Rouergue Mutiny – A group of pro-Partisan soldiers, led by Ferid Džanić and others within the 13th Waffen Mountain Division of the SS Handschar (1st Croatian), training in occupied France, rise against Nazi German troops in the Division; the revolt is rapidly suppressed.
- September 21–26 – WWII: Massacre of the Acqui Division – German soldiers of the 1st Mountain Division (Wehrmacht) kill over 5,100 Italian military internees resisting disarmament on the Greek island of Cephalonia.
- September 22–October 2 – WWII: Landing at Scarlet Beach on the Huon Peninsula of New Guinea by Allied forces, the first time Australian troops have made an opposed amphibious landing since the Gallipoli Campaign of 1915.
- September 23 – WWII: The Italian Social Republic ("Republic of Salò") is founded in northern Italy as a puppet state of Nazi Germany.
- September 25 – WWII: The Russian city of Smolensk is liberated by Soviet forces as a part of the successful Smolensk operation.
- September 27 – WWII: Four days of Naples begins: a popular uprising drives German occupying forces from the city.
- September 30 – Pope Pius XII issues the encyclical Divino afflante Spiritu calling for Catholic scholars to produce new Bible translations based on the source languages.

=== October ===
- October 1 – WWII: United States forces enter liberated Naples.
- October 3 – WWII: Nazi Wehrmacht forces commit the Lyngiades massacre in northwest Greece as an arbitrary reprisal.
- October 6 – WWII: Americans and Japanese fight the naval Battle of Vella Lavella.
- October 7 – WWII: The Naples post-office bombing kills 100.
- October 10
  - WWII: Double Tenth incident (Japanese occupation of Singapore): The Japanese military police, the Kempeitai, arrest and torture more than 50 civilians and civilian internees, on false suspicion of their involvement in a raid on Singapore Harbour during Operation Jaywick.
  - The Order of Bogdan Khmelnitsky is instituted in the Soviet Union.
- October 13 – WWII: The new government of Italy sides with the Allies and declares war on Germany.
- October 14
  - WWII: During the Second Raid on Schweinfurt, the United States Eighth Air Force suffers so many losses, that it loses air supremacy over Germany for several months.
  - The Holocaust: Uprising in Sobibór extermination camp; about half the inmates escape. Three days later, the camp is closed.
  - José P. Laurel takes the oath of office as President of the Philippines (Second Philippine Republic).
- October 16 – The Holocaust: Raid of the Ghetto of Rome – Over a thousand Jews are rounded up in Rome by the Gestapo; only 16 will survive their deportation to Auschwitz concentration camp. The public silence of Pope Pius XII on the raid becomes a matter of historical controversy.
- October 17 – WWII:
  - The last commerce raider, German auxiliary cruiser Michel, is sunk off Japan by United States submarine Tarpon.
  - The Burma Railway is completed between Bangkok, Thailand and Rangoon, Burma (modern-day Myanmar) (415 km (258 mi)) by the Empire of Japan, to support its forces in the Burma campaign, using the forced labour of Asian civilians and Allied Prisoners of war.
- October 18 – WWII:
  - Third Moscow Conference: A meeting takes place at the Kremlin between the British, American, and Soviet foreign ministers Anthony Eden, Cordell Hull and Vyacheslav Molotov. The USSR agrees to the full creation of a world peace organization with its Allies.
  - Chiang Kai-shek takes the oath of office as Chairman of the National Government of China.
- October 19 – WWII: Allied aircraft sink the German-controlled cargo ship MS Sinfra in the Mediterranean, killing over 2,000 people, mostly Italian military internees.
- October 21 – Lucie Aubrac and others in her French Resistance cell liberate Raymond Aubrac from Gestapo imprisonment.
- October 22 – WWII: Bombing of Kassel in World War II: The British Royal Air Force delivers a highly destructive airstrike on the German industrial and population center of Kassel; at least 10,000 are killed and 150,000 are made homeless.
- October 24 – WWII: British Royal Navy destroyer HMS Eclipse (H08) is sunk by a mine in the Aegean Sea, with the loss of 119 of the ship's company and 134 troops.
- October 30
  - WWII: Signing of Moscow Declarations: the Declaration of the Four Nations on general security, by the United States, United Kingdom, Soviet Union and Republic of China; and the Declarations on Italy, Austria and Atrocities by the first three governments.
  - The Merrie Melodies animated cartoon Falling Hare, one of the only shorts with Bugs Bunny getting out-smarted, is released in the United States.

=== November ===
Chiang Kai-shek, Franklin D. Roosevelt and Winston Churchill at the Cairo Conference, November 25, 1943.

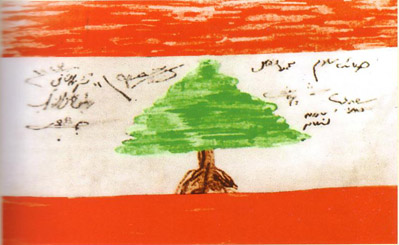
The first Lebanese flag hand drawn and signed by the deputies of the Lebanese parliament, November 11, 1943. The French Mandate ends and Lebanon gains independence in November 1943.

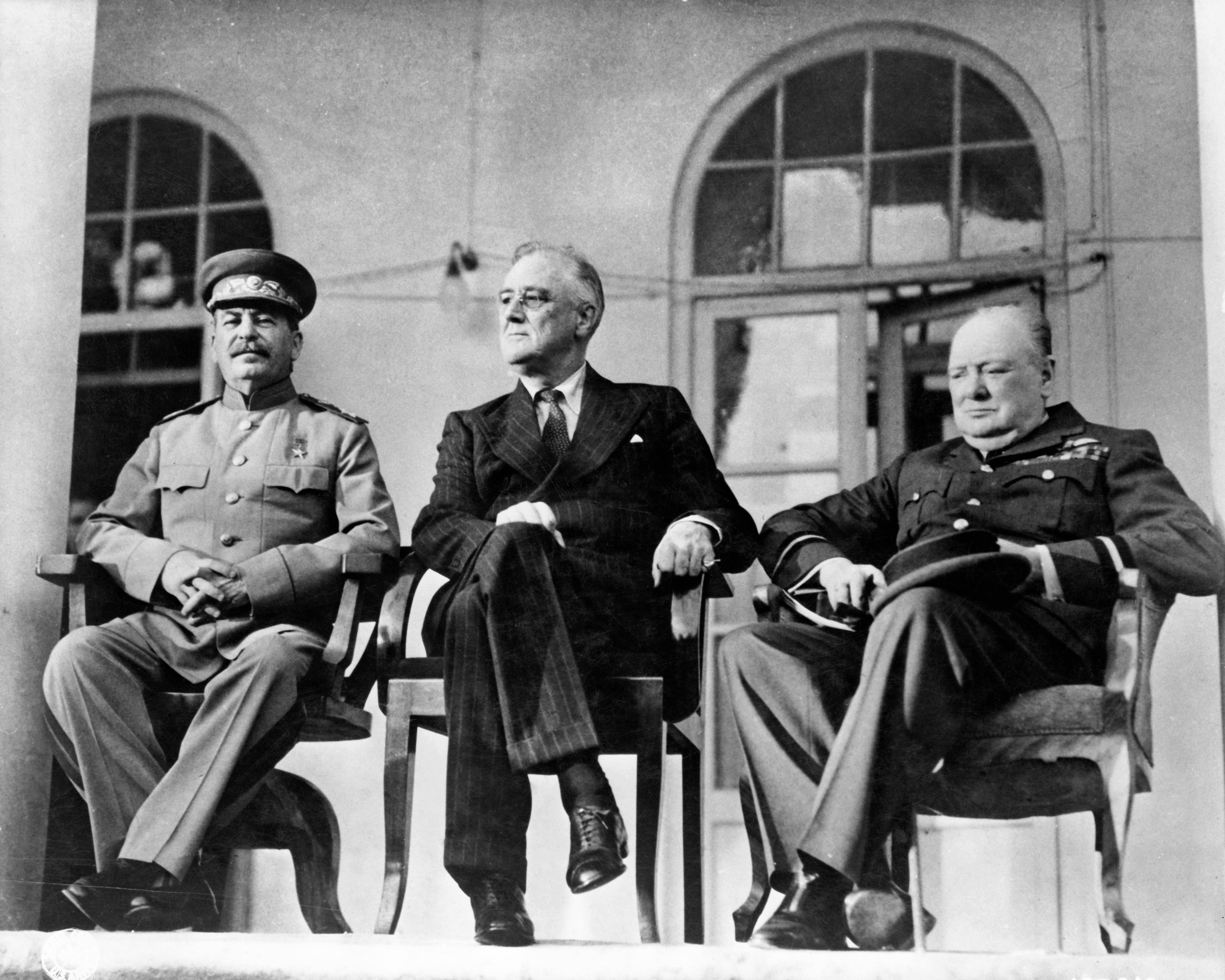
Joseph Stalin, Franklin D. Roosevelt and Winston Churchill on the verandah of the Soviet Embassy in Tehran during the Tehran Conference

- November 1 – WWII: Operation Goodtime: United States Marines land on Bougainville Island in the Solomon Islands.
- November 2 – WWII:
  - Battle of Empress Augusta Bay off Bougainville Island: American and Japanese ships fight to a draw.
  - WWII: British forces in Italy reach the Garigliano River.
- November 3–4 – The Holocaust: Aktion Erntefest ("Operation Harvest Festival") – The largest single day massacre of Jews in the entire war takes place when over 43,000 Jews are murdered by the SS, the Ordnungspolizei and the "Trawniki men" in Sonderdienst formations at the Majdanek, Trawniki and Poniatowa concentration camps in the General Government territory of occupied Poland.
- November 5 – WWII:
  - Battle of the Dnieper: Soviet forces of the 4th Ukrainian Front under General Fyodor Tolbukhin overrun the area between the lower Dnieper and the Crimea. The German 6th Army pulls back across the river, leaving the bridgehead at Nikopol on the east bank. The Crimea is cut off from the rest of the German army.
  - First Bombing of the Vatican – Four bombs are dropped on the neutral Vatican City; the aircraft responsible is never certainly identified.
- November 6 – WWII: The Ukrainian capital of Kiev is liberated by Soviet forces from its German occupiers as part of the Battle of Kiev.
- November 9 – An agreement founding the United Nations Relief and Rehabilitation Administration is signed by 44 countries in the White House, Washington, D.C.
- November 10 – The Lübeck martyrs, four men of religion, are executed for supposedly treasonable views.
- November 14 – Leonard Bernstein, substituting at the last minute for ailing principal conductor Bruno Walter, directs the New York Philharmonic in its regular Sunday afternoon broadcast concert, over CBS Radio. The event receives front-page coverage in The New York Times the following day.
- November 15 – Porajmos: German SS leader Heinrich Himmler orders that Gypsies be put "on the same level as Jews and placed in Nazi concentration camps".
- November 16 – WWII:
  - After flying from Britain, 160 American bombers strike a hydro-electric power facility and heavy water factory in German-controlled Vemork, Norway.
  - A Japanese submarine sinks the surfaced U.S. submarine USS Corvina, near Chuuk Lagoon (Truk).
- November 18 – WWII: Battle of Berlin – The British Royal Air Force opens its bombing campaign against Berlin with 440 planes, causing only light damage and killing 131. The RAF loses 9 aircraft and 53 aviators.
- November 19 – The Holocaust: Inmates of Janowska concentration camp, near Lwów (at this time in German-occupied Poland), stage a failed uprising, after which the SS liquidates the camp, resulting in at least 6,000 deaths.
- November 20 – WWII: Battle of Tarawa: United States Marines land on Tarawa and Makin atolls in the Gilbert Islands (Kiribati from 1979) and take heavy fire from Japanese shore guns.
- November 22–26 – WWII: Cairo Conference ("Sextant") – President of the United States Franklin D. Roosevelt, Prime Minister of the United Kingdom Winston Churchill and Chairman of the National Government of China Chiang Kai-shek meet at Cairo, Egypt, to discuss ways to defeat Japan in the Pacific War.
- November 22 – Lebanon gains independence, upon the ending of the French Mandate.
- November 23 – The Deutsches Opernhaus on Bismarckstraße, in the Berlin district of Charlottenburg, is destroyed in an air raid (it is reopened in 1961, as the Deutsche Oper Berlin).
- November 25 – WWII: Americans and Japanese fight the naval Battle of Cape St. George, between Buka and New Ireland.
- November 26 – WWII: British troopship HMT Rohna is sunk off the north African coast by a Luftwaffe Henschel Hs 293 radio controlled glide bomb, killing 1,015.
- November 27 – The 1943 Tosya–Ladik earthquake in Turkey kills thousands.
- November 28 – WWII: Tehran Conference: U.S. President Franklin D. Roosevelt, British Prime Minister Winston Churchill and Soviet leader Joseph Stalin meet in Tehran, to discuss war strategy. On November 30, they establish an agreement concerning a planned June 1944 invasion of Europe, codenamed Operation Overlord.
- November 29 – The second session of AVNOJ, the Anti-Fascist Council of National Liberation of Yugoslavia, is held in Jajce, Bosnia and Herzegovina, to determine the post-war ordering of the country.

=== December ===
- December 2 – WWII: Bari chemical warfare disaster: A surprise Luftwaffe air raid on Bari, Italy sinks 28 Allied ships in the harbor, including the American Liberty ship SS John Harvey, releasing its secret cargo of mustard gas bombs, inflating the number of casualties.
- December 3
  - In reprisal for an act of sabotage, the SS and Gestapo execute 100 Warsaw Tramway workers.
  - Edward R. Murrow delivers his classic "Orchestrated Hell" broadcast over CBS Radio, describing a Royal Air Force nighttime bombing raid on Berlin.
- December 4
  - WWII: In Yugoslavia, resistance leader Marshal Tito proclaims a provisional democratic Yugoslav government-in-exile.
  - With unemployment figures falling fast due to WWII-related employment, U.S. President Franklin D. Roosevelt closes the Works Progress Administration.
  - WWII: Bolivia declares war on Romania and Hungary.
- December 7 – Chiara Lubich starts the humanitarian Focolare Movement in Trento, Italy.
- December 13 – WWII: Massacre of Kalavryta – The occupying 117th Jäger Division (Wehrmacht) machine-guns all adult males from Kalavryta, Greece, subsequently burning the town.
- December 15 – WWII: American and Australian forces begin the Battle of Arawe as a diversion before a larger landing at Cape Gloucester on New Britain, in Papua New Guinea.
- December 16 - WWII: President Franklin Delano Roosevelt is returned to the United States by the USS Iowa after completing his trip to the Cairo and Tehran Conferences.
- December 20 – A military coup is staged in Bolivia.
- December 20–28 – WWII: Italian Campaign – Battle of Ortona: Canadian infantry defeat elite German paratroops.
- December 24
  - WWII: U.S. General Dwight D. Eisenhower becomes Supreme Allied Commander Europe. He establishes the Supreme Headquarters Allied Expeditionary Force in London.
  - WWII: Dnieper–Carpathian offensive of Soviet Arme begins.
- December 26 – WWII: Battle of the North Cape – German battleship Scharnhorst is torpedoed and sunk in a night action north of the Arctic Circle by British battleship HMS Duke of York and her escorts with the loss of all but 36 of the German crew of 1,943 (including Admiral Erich Bey); this is the war's last action between big-gun capital ships of Britain and Germany.
- December 30 – Subhas Chandra Bose sets up a pro-Japanese Indian government at Port Blair, India.
- December 31 – The Times Square Ball in Times Square, New York City, is not dropped a second time. Instead, there is a moment of silence at midnight, followed by the sound of bells playing from sound trucks at the base of One Times Square.

=== Date unknown ===
- Bengal Famine.
- History of the cooperative movement: Father José María Arizmendiarrieta sets up a polytechnic school at Mondragón in the Spanish Basque Country (predecessor of the University of Mondragón), which inspires creation of the Mondragon Corporation.
- Arana Hall, a residential college of the University of Otago in Dunedin, New Zealand, is founded.
- Jacques-Yves Cousteau co-invents, with Émile Gagnan, the first commercially successful open circuit type of scuba diving equipment, the Aqua-lung.
- Martin Noth's groundbreaking work of Old Testament scholarship, Überlieferungsgeschichtliche Studien: Die sammelnden und bearbeitenden Geschichtswerke im Alten Testament, is published.
- The accident of two steam locomotives in the south of Elo river bridge Magelang, Central Java, Indonesia. They came from Mertoyudan train station and Yogyakarta.

== Births ==
=== January ===
- January 2 – Barış Manço, Turkish singer, television personality (d. 1999)
- January 4 – Doris Kearns Goodwin, American writer
- January 6 – Terry Venables, English footballer and manager (d. 2023)
- January 7 – Sadako Sasaki, Japanese atomic bomb sickness victim (d. 1955)
- January 9 – Scott Walker, American-born singer, composer and record producer (d. 2019)
- January 10 – Jim Croce, American surburbia musician (d. 1973)
- January 14
  - Mariss Jansons, Latvian conductor (d. 2019)
  - José Luis Rodríguez, Venezuelan singer
  - Ralph M. Steinman, Canadian immunologist, cell biologist and Nobel laureate (d. 2011)
  - Holland Taylor, American actress
- January 15
  - Kirin Kiki, Japanese actress (d. 2018)
  - Dame Margaret Beckett, British politician
- January 17
  - Daniel Brandenstein, American astronaut
  - René Préval, 2nd Prime Minister of Haiti, 38th and 40th President of Haiti (d. 2017)
- January 19
  - Janis Joplin, American rock singer (d. 1970)
  - Princess Margriet of the Netherlands
- January 22 – Marília Pêra, Brazilian actress (d. 2015)
- January 24 – Sharon Tate, American actress and model (d. 1969)
- January 26 – Soad Hosny, Egyptian actress (d. 2001)

=== February ===
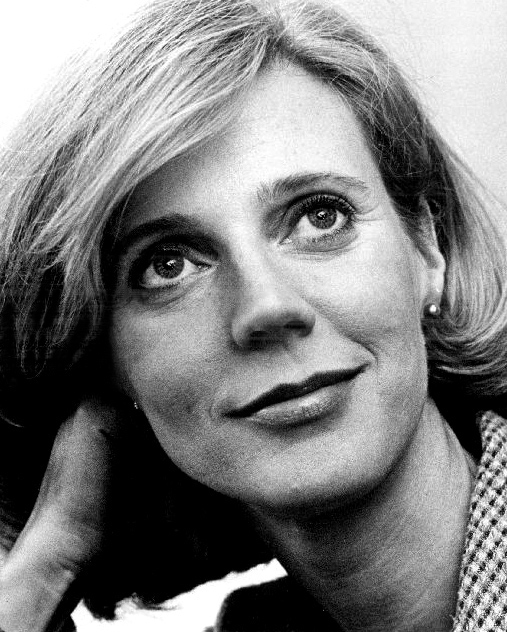
Blythe Danner

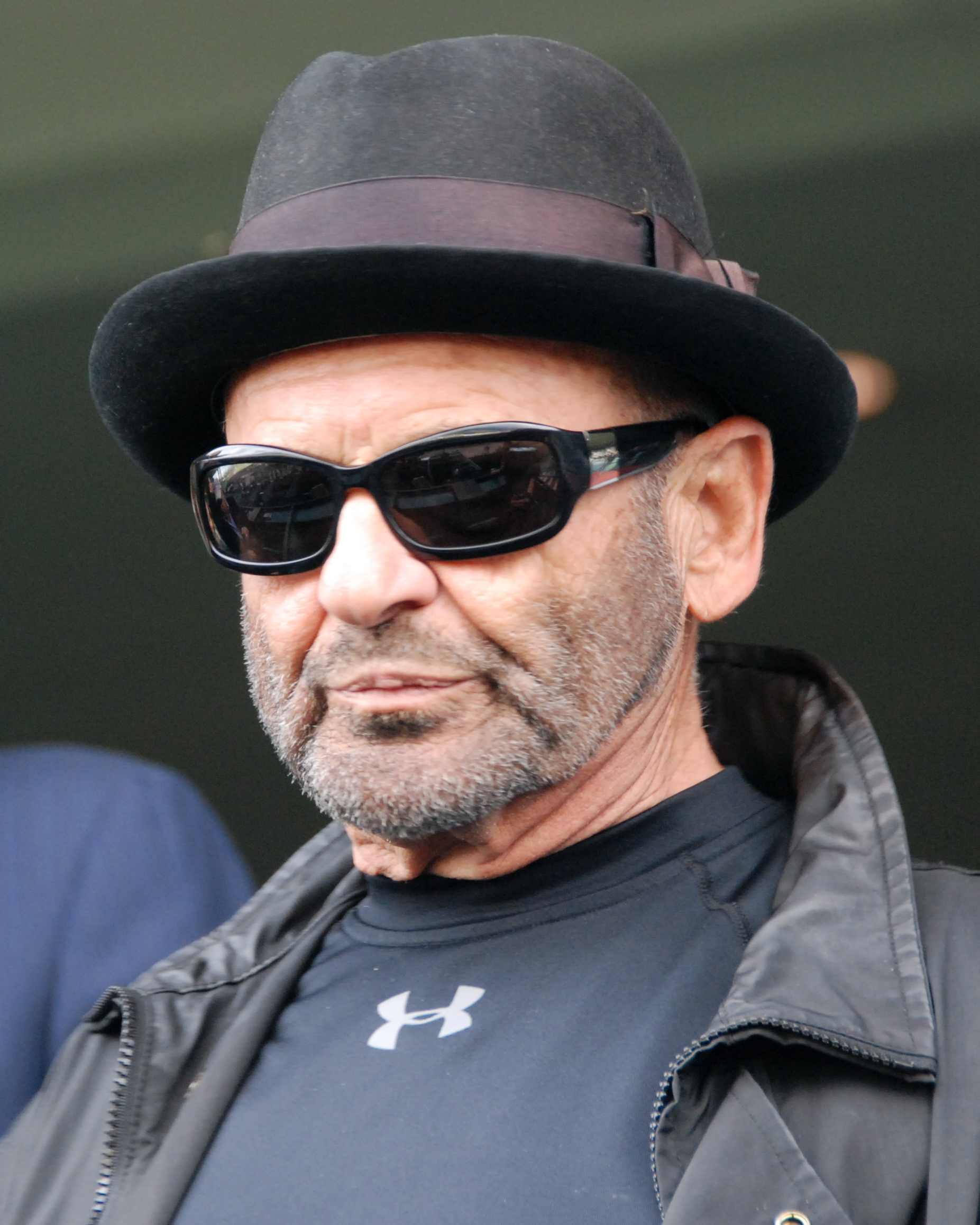
Joe Pesci

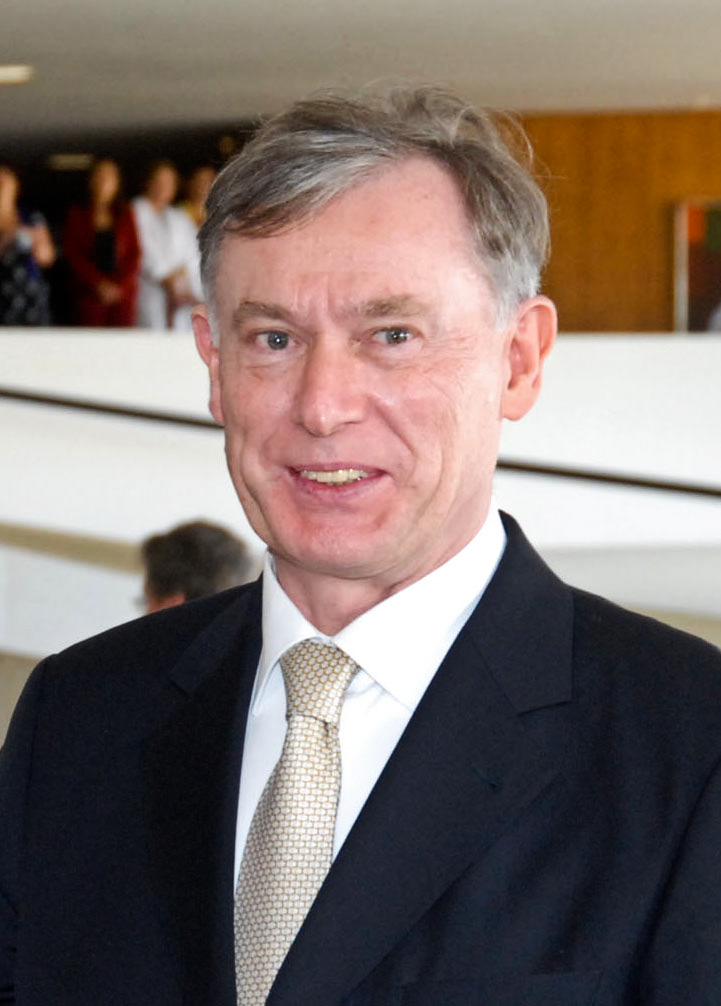
Horst Köhler

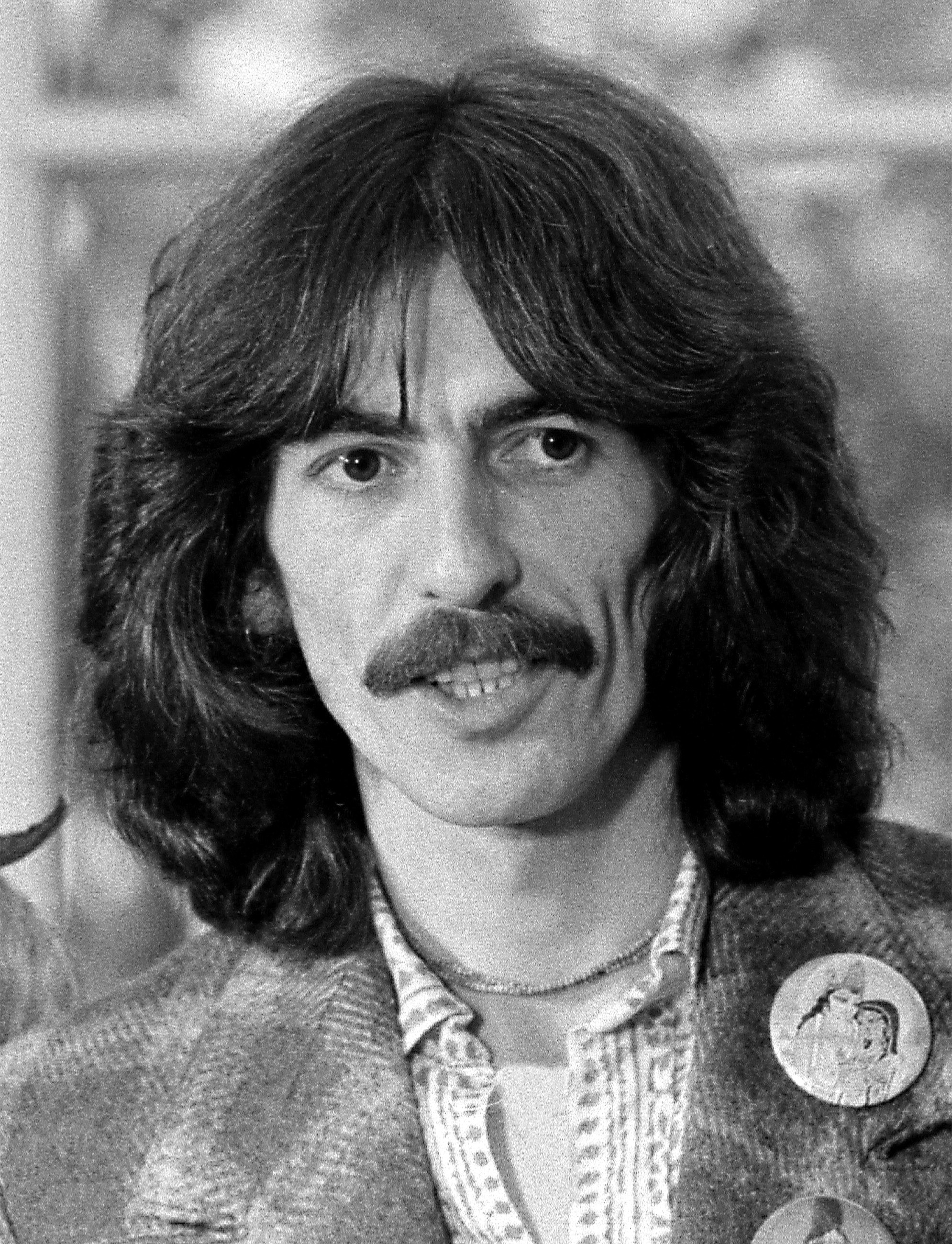
George Harrison

- February 3
  - Blythe Danner, American actress
  - Dennis Edwards, American soul, R&B singer (d. 2018)
  - Eric Haydock, British musician (d. 2019)
- February 4 – Alberto João Jardim, Portuguese politician
- February 5
  - Nolan Bushnell, American video game pioneer
  - Michael Mann, American film director, writer and producer
  - Craig Morton, American football player
- February 7 – Gareth Hunt, English actor (d. 2007)
- February 8 – Creed Bratton, American actor, musician
- February 9
  - Joe Pesci, American actor (Goodfellas)
  - Joseph E. Stiglitz, American economist, Nobel Prize laureate
- February 10 – Walter B. Jones Jr., American politician (d. 2019)
- February 11 – Mohammad Rafiquzzaman, Bangladeshi lyricist
- February 14 – Maceo Parker, American musician (James Brown, P-Funk)
- February 15 – Elke Heidenreich, German author, TV presenter and journalist
- February 18 – Graeme Garden, Scottish writer, comedian and actor
- February 19
  - Homer Hickam, American aerospace engineer and writer
  - Tim Hunt, British biochemist, recipient of the Nobel Prize in Physiology or Medicine
- February 20
  - Aleksandr Aleksandrov, Soviet cosmonaut
  - Antonio Inoki, Japanese professional wrestler (d. 2022)
  - Mike Leigh, British film director
- February 21
  - David Geffen, American record executive, film producer
  - Lyudmila Ulitskaya, Russian novelist
- February 22
  - Dick Van Arsdale, American basketball player
  - Tom Van Arsdale, American basketball player
  - Horst Köhler, President of the Federal Republic of Germany (d. 2025)
  - Eduard Limonov, Russian writer, poet, publicist, and political dissident (d. 2020)
- February 25
  - Boediono, Indonesian economist, 11th Vice President of Indonesia
  - George Harrison, English singer, guitarist (The Beatles) (d. 2001)
- February 26
  - Bill Duke, American actor, director
  - Darcus Howe, Trinidadian-born British civil rights activist (d. 2017)
- February 27 – Morten Lauridsen, American composer

=== March ===
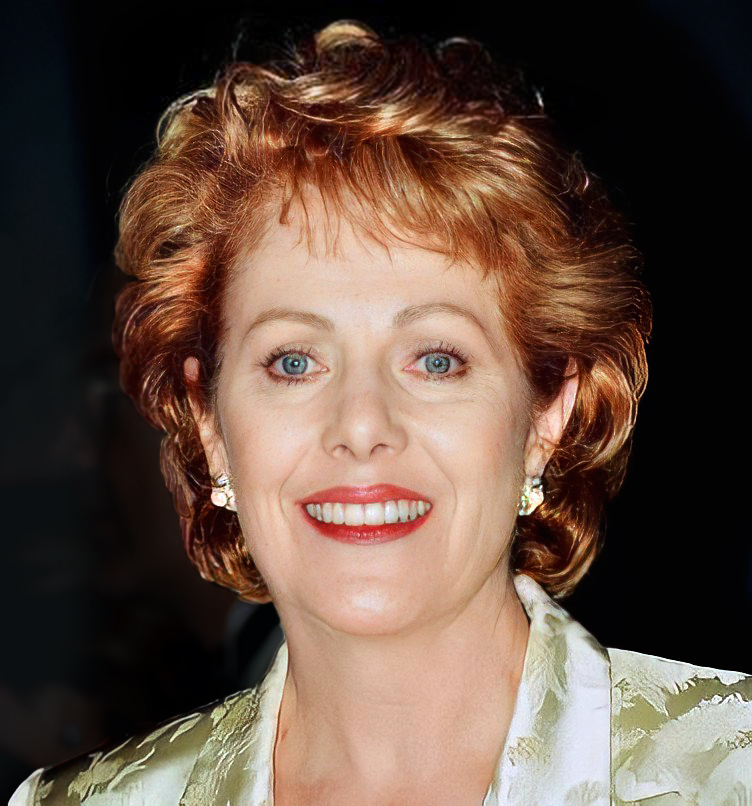
Lynn Redgrave

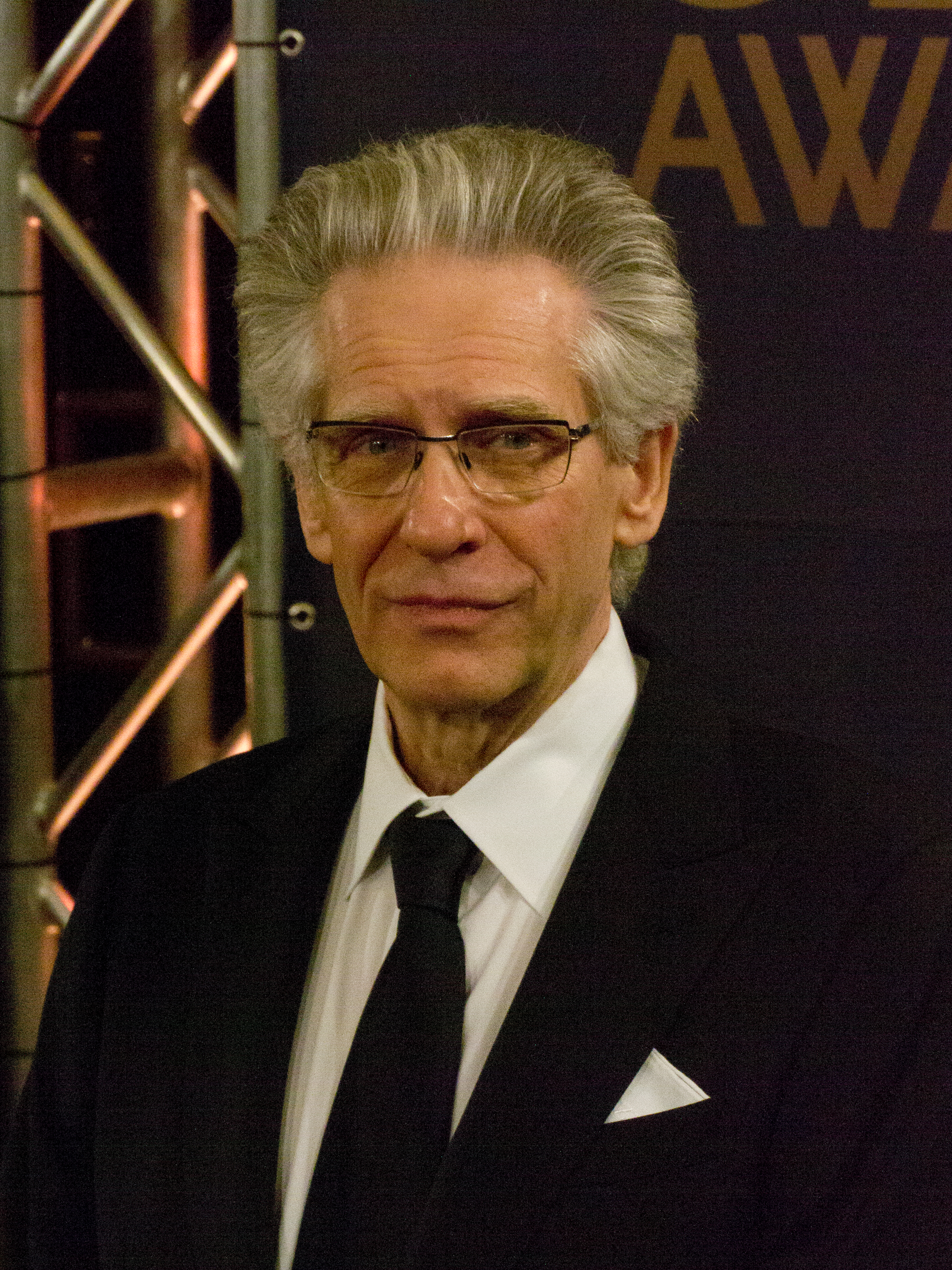
David Cronenberg

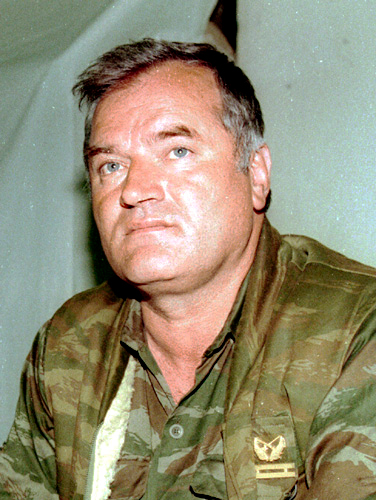
Ratko Mladić

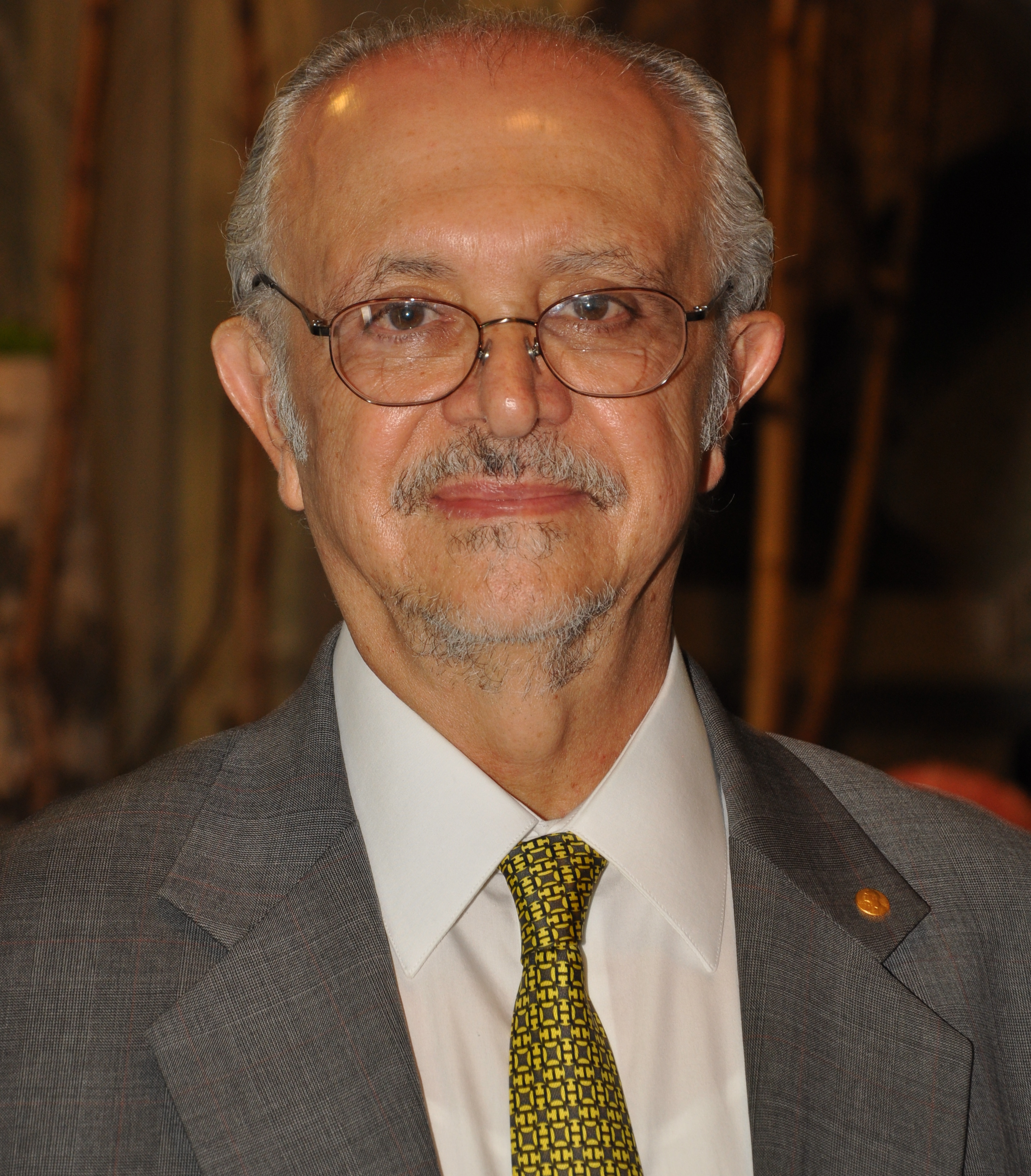
Mario Molina

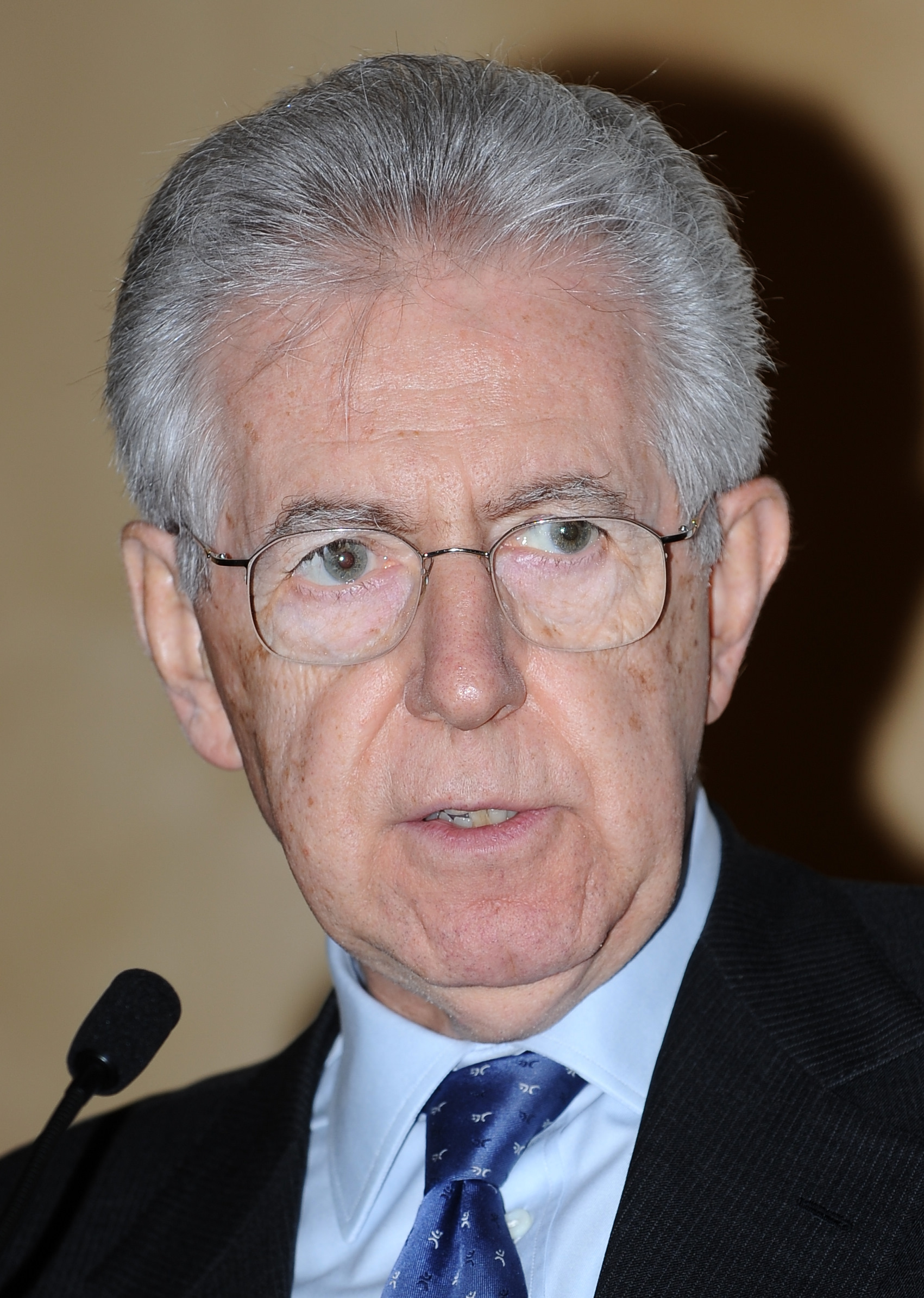
Mario Monti

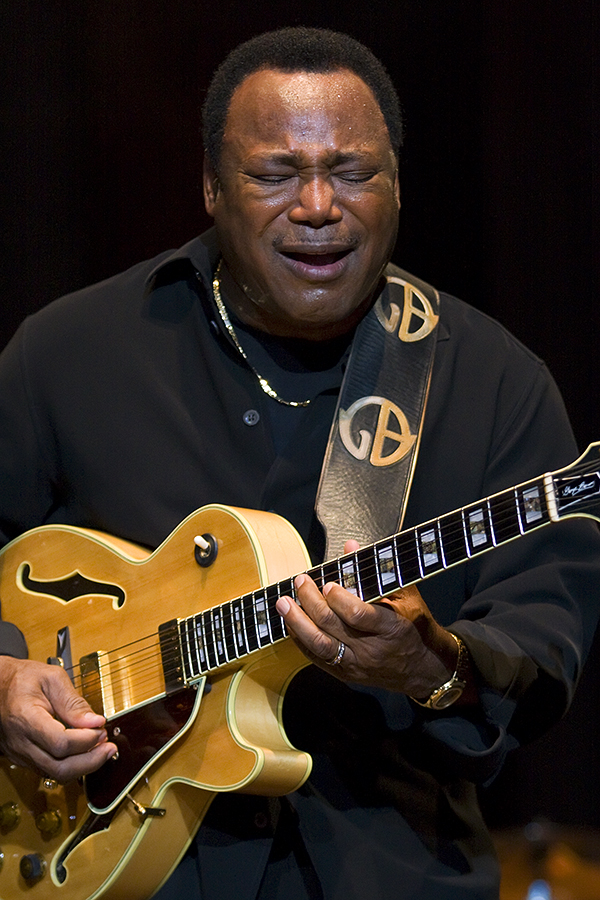
George Benson

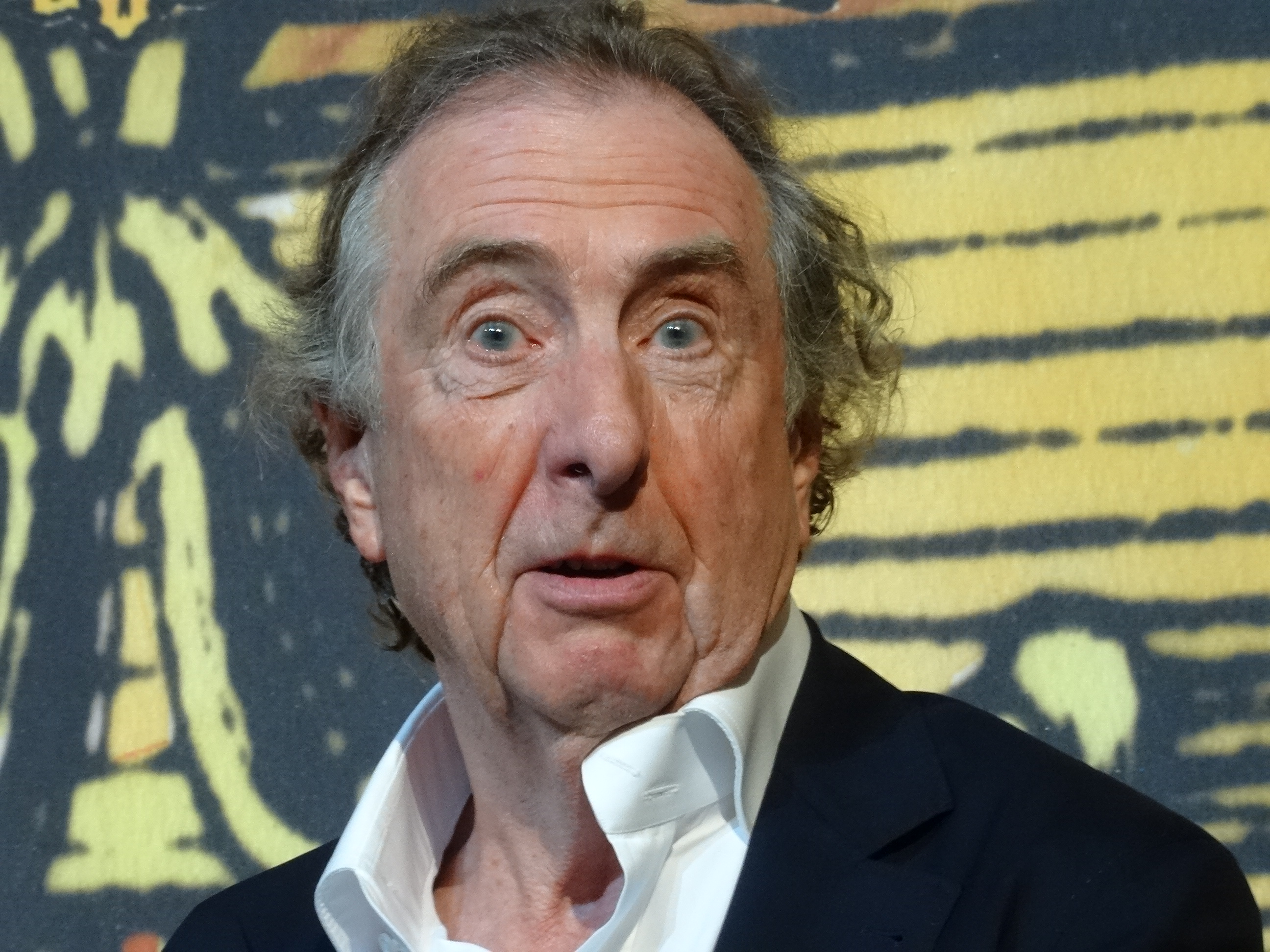
Eric Idle

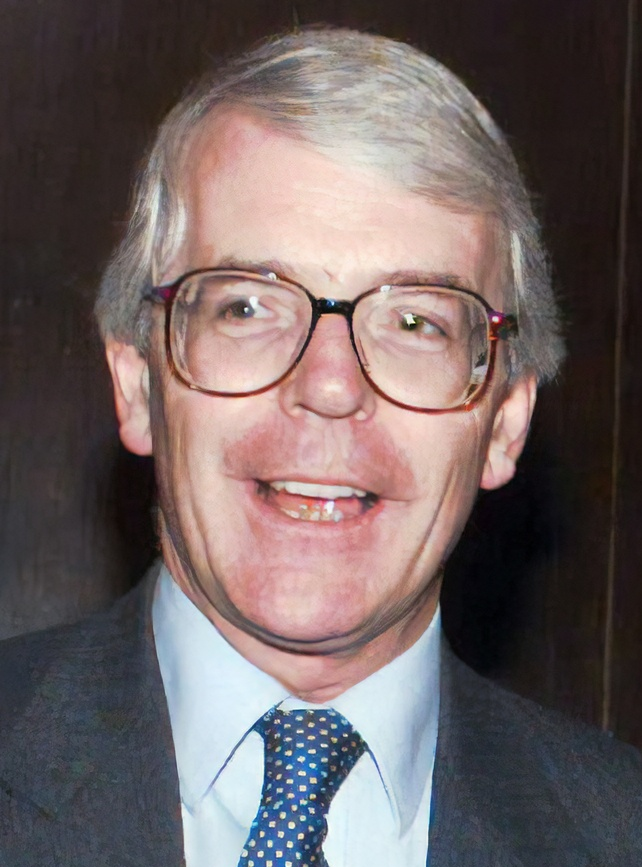
Sir John Major

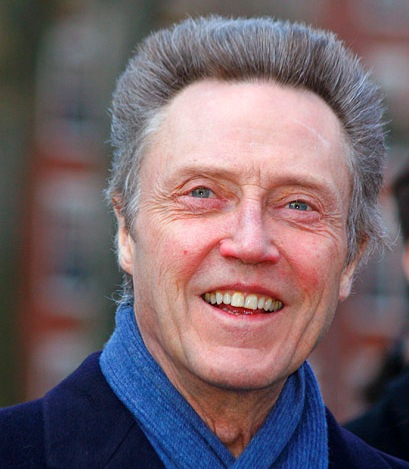
Christopher Walken

- March 1 – Gil Amelio, American entrepreneur
- March 2
  - Zygfryd Blaut, Polish footballer (d. 2005)
  - Tony Meehan, British drummer (The Shadows) (d. 2005)
  - Peter Straub, American author (d. 2022)
- March 3 – Trond Mohn, Norwegian billionaire
- March 4
  - Lucio Dalla, Italian singer-songwriter (d. 2012)
  - Zoltán Jeney, Hungarian composer (d. 2019)
- March 5
  - Shehu Musa Yar'Adua, Nigerian Army major general (d. 1997)
  - Lucio Battisti, Italian singer-songwriter (d. 1998)
- March 8
  - Lynn Redgrave, English-American actress (d. 2010)
  - Susan Clark, Canadian actress (Webster)
- March 9
  - Bobby Fischer, American chess player (d. 2008)
  - Charles Gibson, American television journalist
- March 11 – Ma'ruf Amin, Indonesian Islamic cleric and 13th Vice President of Indonesia
- March 12 – Ratko Mladic, Serbia military leader (d. 2026)
- March 13 – André Téchiné, French film director
- March 15
  - David Cronenberg, Canadian film director
  - Kohji Moritsugu, Japanese actor (Ultraseven)
  - Sly Stone, African-American singer (Sly and the Family Stone) (d. 2025)
- March 19
  - Mario J. Molina, Mexican chemist, Nobel Prize laureate (d. 2020)
  - Mario Monti, 54th Prime Minister of Italy
- March 20
  - Gerard Malanga, American poet, photographer
  - Douglas Tompkins, American conservationist, businessman (d. 2015)
- March 21
  - Luigi Agnolin, Italian football referee (d. 2018)
  - István Gyulai, Hungarian sports official (d. 2006)
  - Vivian Stanshall, British comedy writer, artist, broadcaster and musician (d. 1995)
  - Andreas, Prince of Saxe-Coburg and Gotha
- March 22
  - George Benson, African American guitarist and singer-songwriter
  - Keith Relf, British rock musician (d. 1976)
- March 24 – Kate Webb, New Zealand-born Australian war correspondent (d. 2007)
- March 25 – Paul Michael Glaser, American actor
- March 26 – Bob Woodward, American journalist
- March 28
  - Oľga Feldeková, Slovak writer (d. 2025)
  - Conchata Ferrell, American actress (d. 2020)
- March 29
  - Eric Idle, English comedian, actor, author and musician (Monty Python's Flying Circus)
  - John Major, British politician, 70th Prime Minister of the United Kingdom
  - Vangelis, Greek musician, composer (Chariots of Fire, Cosmos) (d. 2022)
- March 30 – Jay Traynor, American singer (Jay and the Americans) (d. 2014)
- March 31
  - Motiur Rahman Nizami, Bangladeshi politician, convicted war criminal (d. 2016)
  - Christopher Walken, American actor

=== April ===
- April 2 – Caterina Bueno, Italian singer (d. 2007)
- April 4 – Isabel-Clara Simó, Spanish journalist and writer (d. 2020)
- April 5
  - Jean-Louis Tauran, French cardinal (d. 2018)
  - Max Gail, American actor (Barney Miller)
- April 6 − Susan Tolsky, American actress and voice actress
- April 8
  - Miller Farr, American football player
  - Jack O'Halloran, American boxer and actor
- April 10
  - Andrzej Badeński, Polish athlete (d. 2008)
  - Margaret Pemberton, English writer
- April 11 – Harley Race, American professional wrestler, promoter and trainer (d. 2019)
- April 13 – Doreen Tracey, British-born American actress (d. 2018)
- April 15
  - Robert Lefkowitz, American physician and biochemist
  - Mighty Sam McClain, American singer, songwriter (d. 2015)
- April 16 – Petro Tyschtschenko, German businessman
- April 17 – Bobby Curtola, Canadian singer (d. 2016)
- April 19 – Claus Theo Gärtner, German actor
- April 20 – John Eliot Gardiner, English conductor
- April 21 – Napsiah Omar, Malaysian educator, politician (d. 2018)
- April 22
  - Louise Glück, American poet, 12th US Poet Laureate, recipient of the Nobel Prize in Literature (d. 2023)
  - Gabriel López Zapiain, Mexican footballer (d. 2018)
- April 23
  - Dominik Duka, Czech cardinal and archbishop (d. 2025)
  - Tony Esposito, Canadian ice hockey goaltender (d. 2021)
  - Gail Goodrich, American basketball player
  - Fighting Harada, Japanese boxer
  - Frans Koppelaar, Dutch painter
  - Hervé Villechaize, French-born actor (Fantasy Island) (d. 1993)
- April 24 – Richard Sterban, American singer (The Oak Ridge Boys)
- April 25
  - Alan Feduccia, American paleornithologist
  - James G. Mitchell, Canadian computer scientist
- April 26 – Gary Wright, American singer, songwriter, musician and composer (d. 2023)
- April 28 – John O. Creighton, American astronaut
- April 29 – Sir Ian Kershaw, English historian
- April 30
  - Frederick Chiluba, Zambian politician, 2nd President of Zambia (d. 2011)
  - Bobby Vee, American singer (d. 2016)

=== May ===
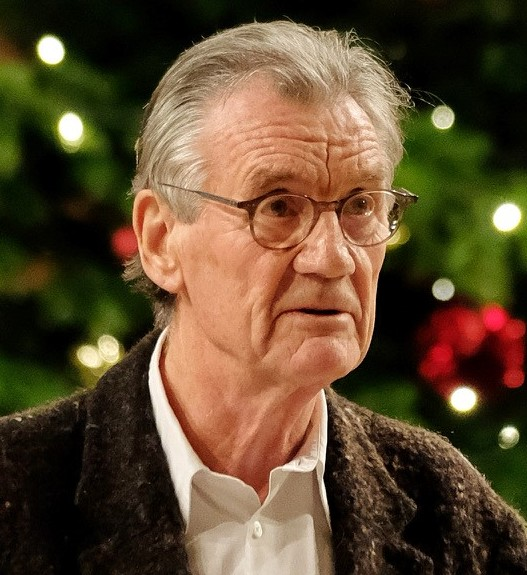
Michael Palin

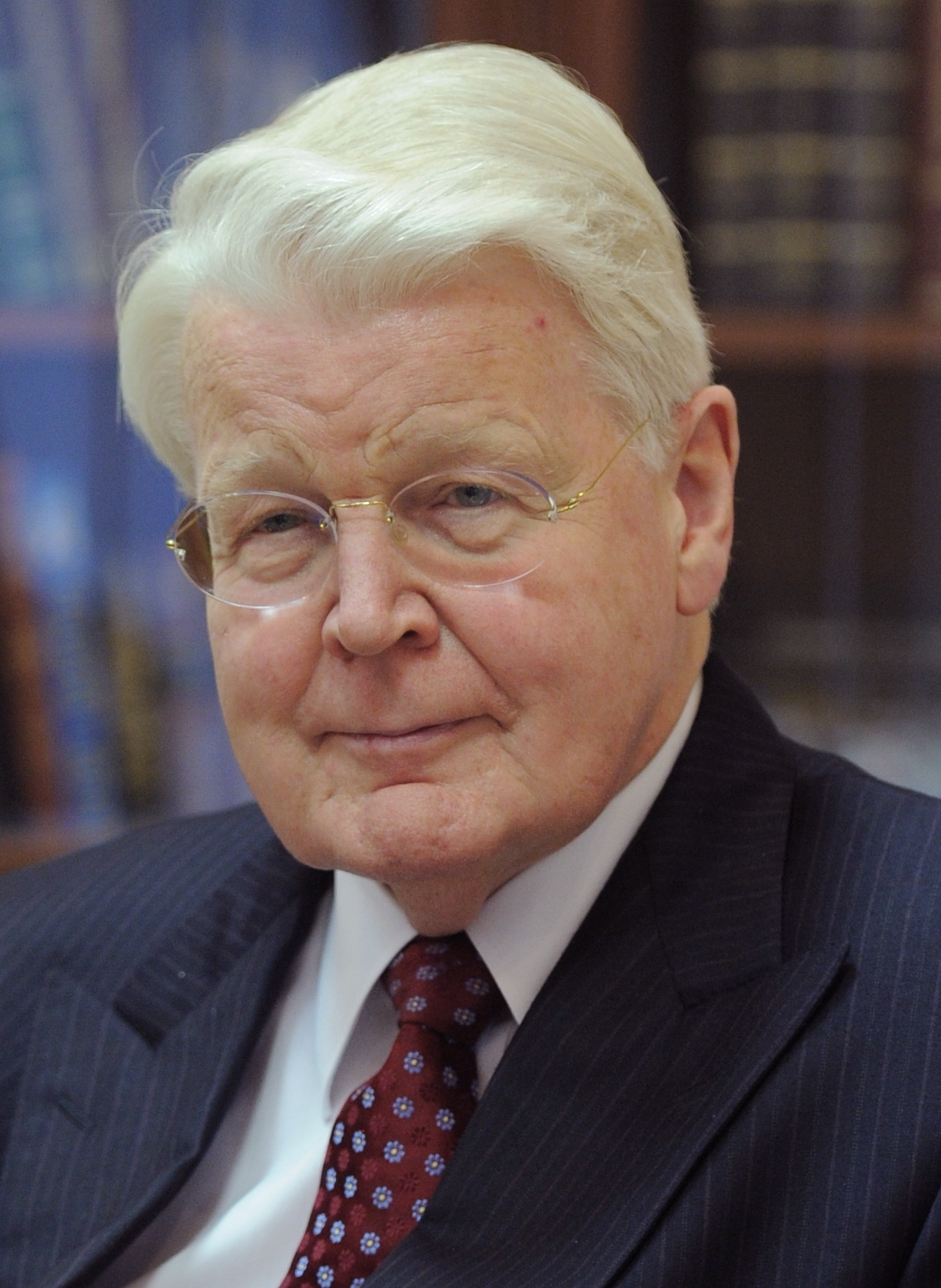
Ólafur Ragnar Grímsson

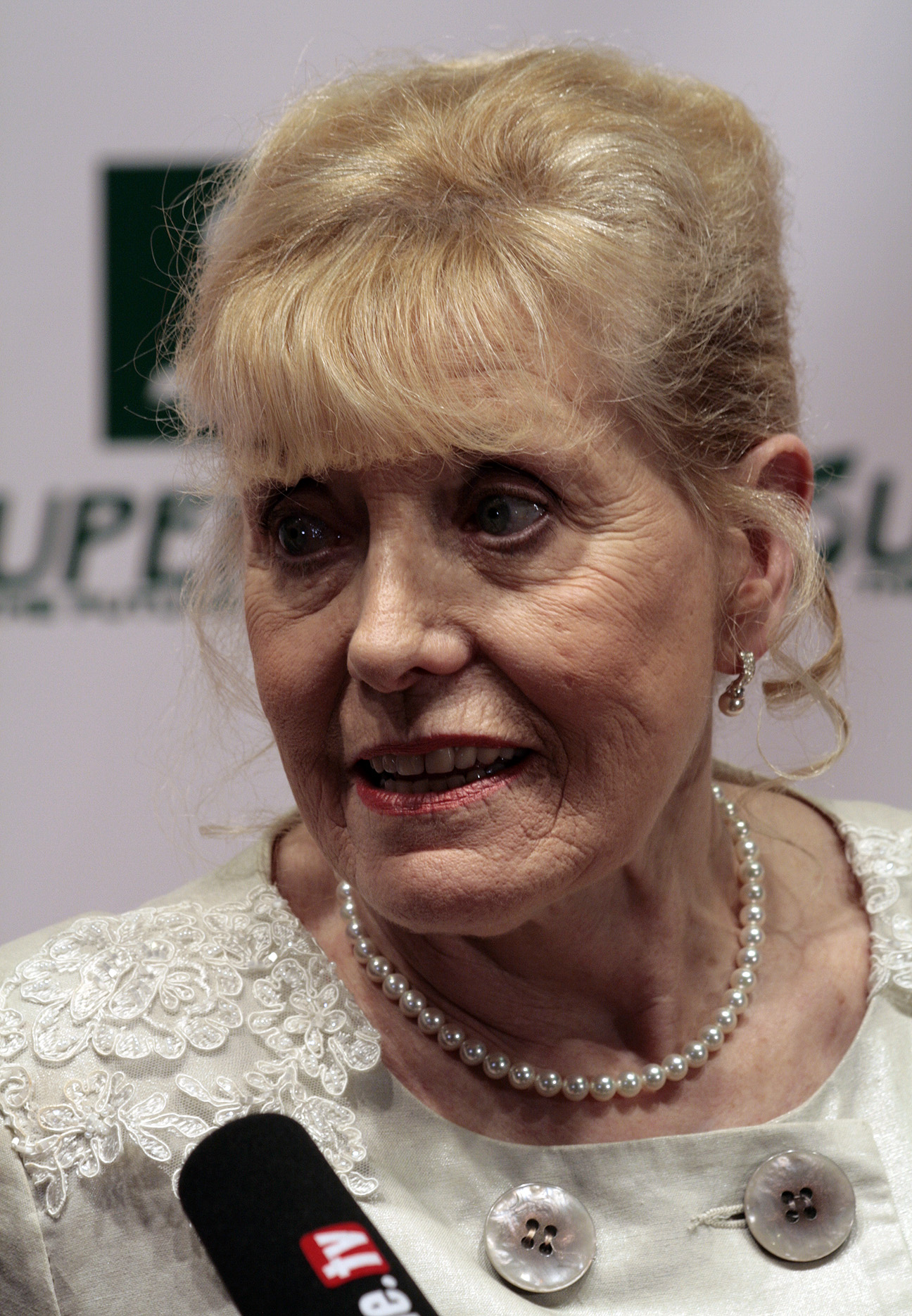
Betty Williams

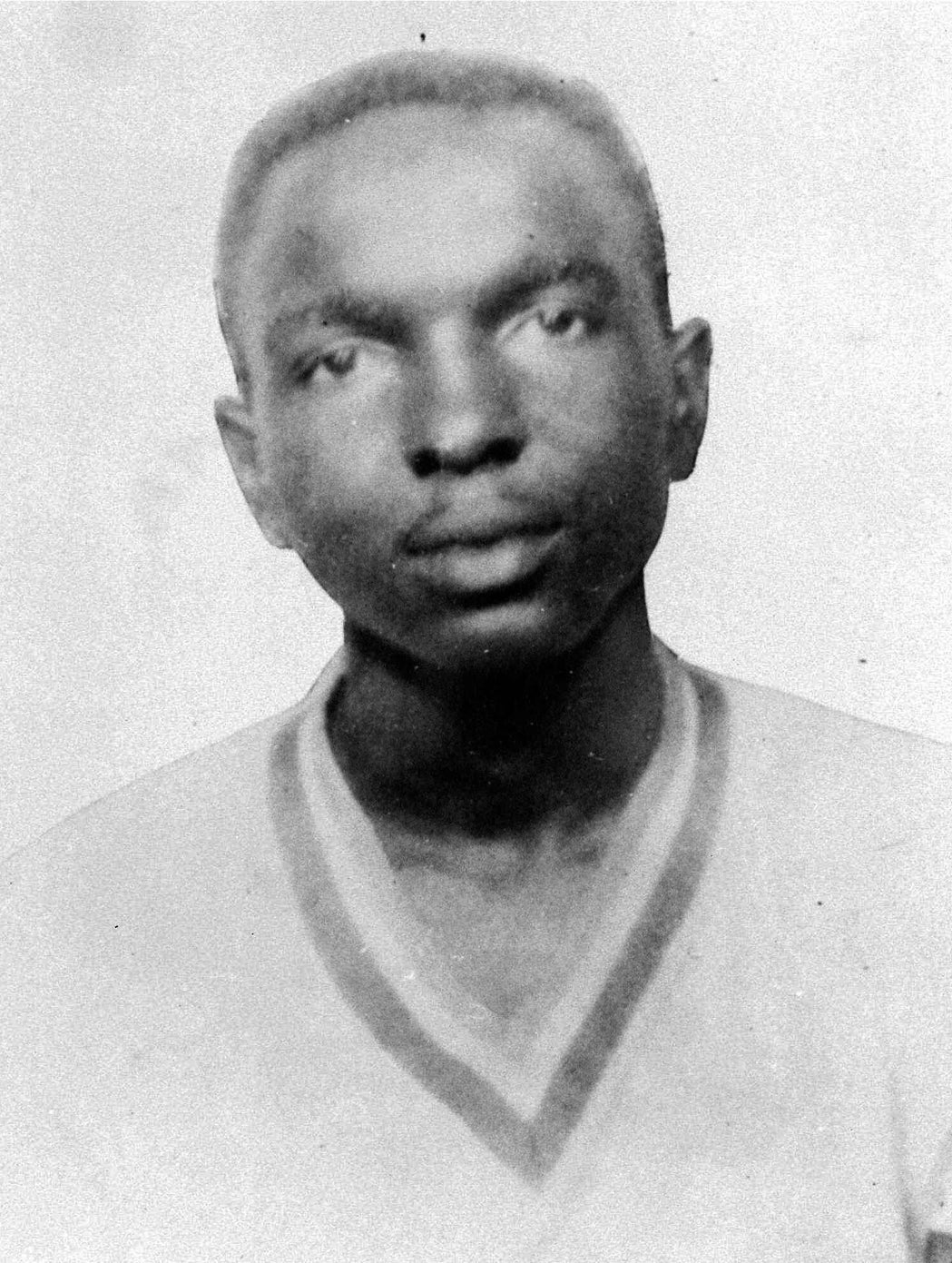
James Chaney

- May 1
  - Ian Dunn, Scottish gay and paedophile rights activist (d. 1998)
  - Vassal Gadoengin, Nauruan politician (d. 2004)
- May 2 – Mustafa Nadarević, Yugoslav and Bosnian actor and comedian (d. 2020)
- May 3 – Jim Risch, American politician
- May 5 – Michael Palin, English comedian, actor, and television presenter (Monty Python's Flying Circus)
- May 6 – Grange Calveley, British writer, artist (d. 2021)
- May 7
  - Orlando Ramírez, Chilean footballer (d. 2018)
  - Thelma Houston, American disco singer
- May 8
  - Danny Whitten, American musician (d. 1972)
  - Gamini Lokuge, Sri Lankan politician (d. 2025)
- May 10 – Richard Darman, American federal government official, businessman (d. 2008)
- May 13 – Kurt Trampedach, Danish artist (d. 2013)
- May 14
  - Jack Bruce, British musician, songwriter (d. 2014)
  - Ólafur Ragnar Grímsson, 5th President of Iceland
- May 16 – Dan Coats, American politician and diplomat
- May 17
  - Mark W. Olson, American economist, politician (d. 2018)
  - Tuanku Syed Sirajuddin, King of Malaysia
  - Mangala Narlikar, Indian mathematician (d. 2023)
- May 20 – Imata Kabua, Marshallese politician, 2nd President of the Marshall Islands (d. 2019)
- May 22
  - Betty Williams, Northern Irish political activist, co-recipient of the Nobel Peace Prize (d. 2020)
  - Tommy John, baseball pitcher. Played 26 years in Major League Baseball for six different teams between 1963 and 1989. In 1974, he suffered a breakage of the UCL in his pitching elbow, which underwent surgery, and the operation was named after his own persona.
- May 24 – Gary Burghoff, American actor (M*A*S*H)
- May 25 – Jessi Colter, American singer, composer
- May 26 – Erica Terpstra, Dutch swimmer, politician and president of the Dutch Olympic Committee
- May 27
  - Bruce Weitz, American actor
  - Diane Pershing, American actress
  - Cilla Black, English singer, entertainer (d. 2015)
- May 29 – Ion Ciubuc, Moldovan politician (d. 2018)
- May 30 – James Chaney, African-American civil rights worker (d. 1964)
- May 31
  - Sharon Gless, American actress
  - Joe Namath, American football player

=== June ===
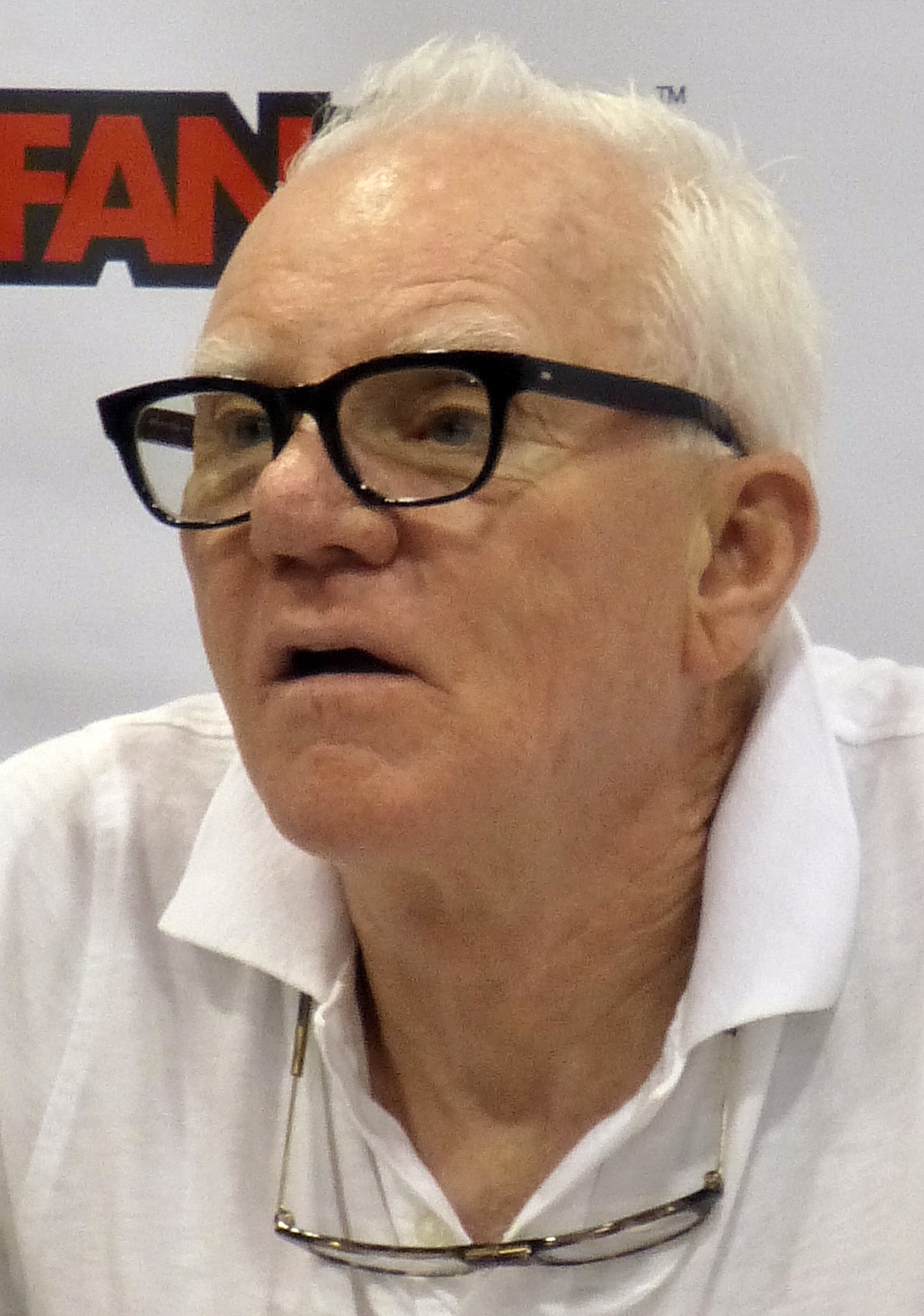
Malcolm McDowell

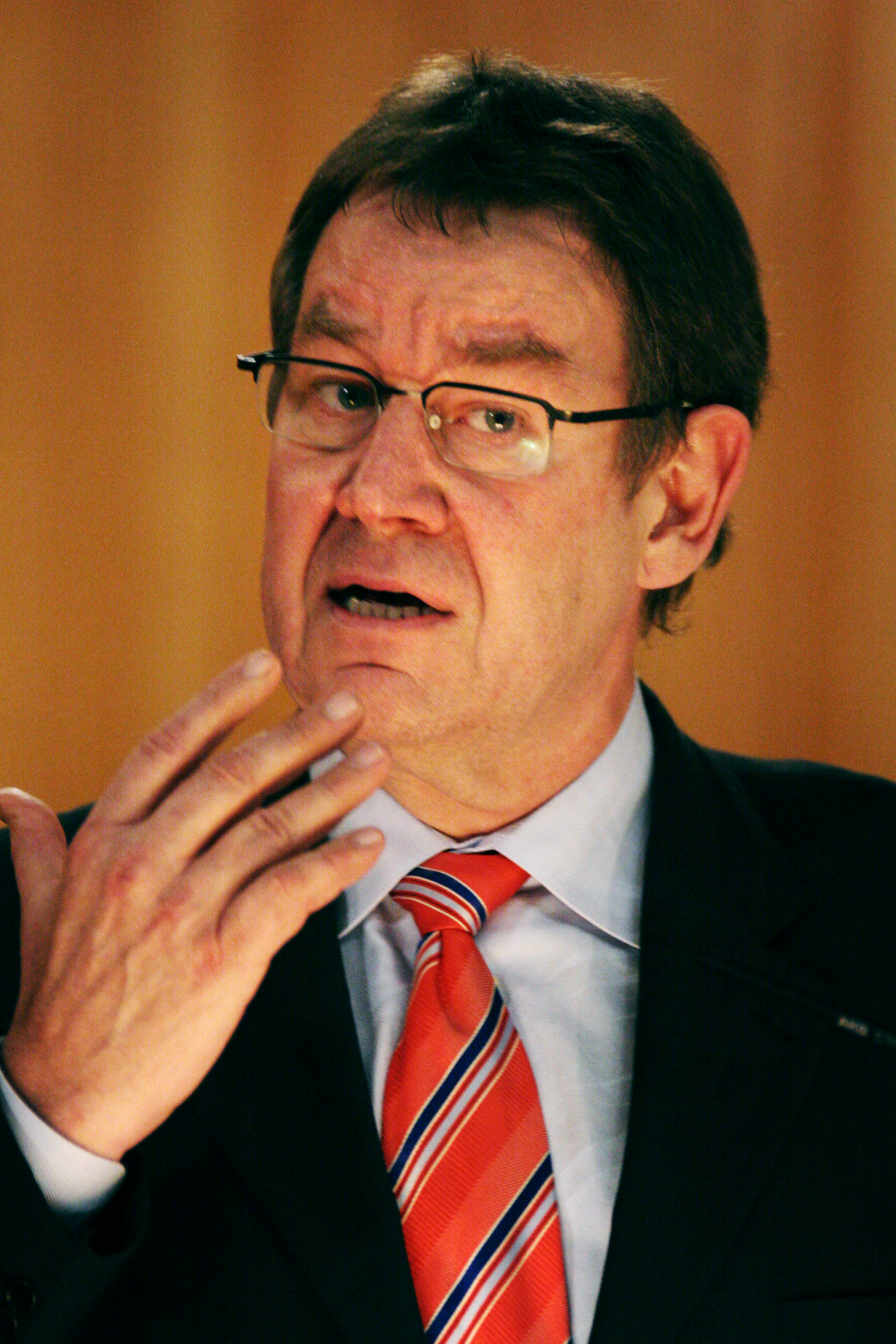
Poul Nyrup Rasmussen

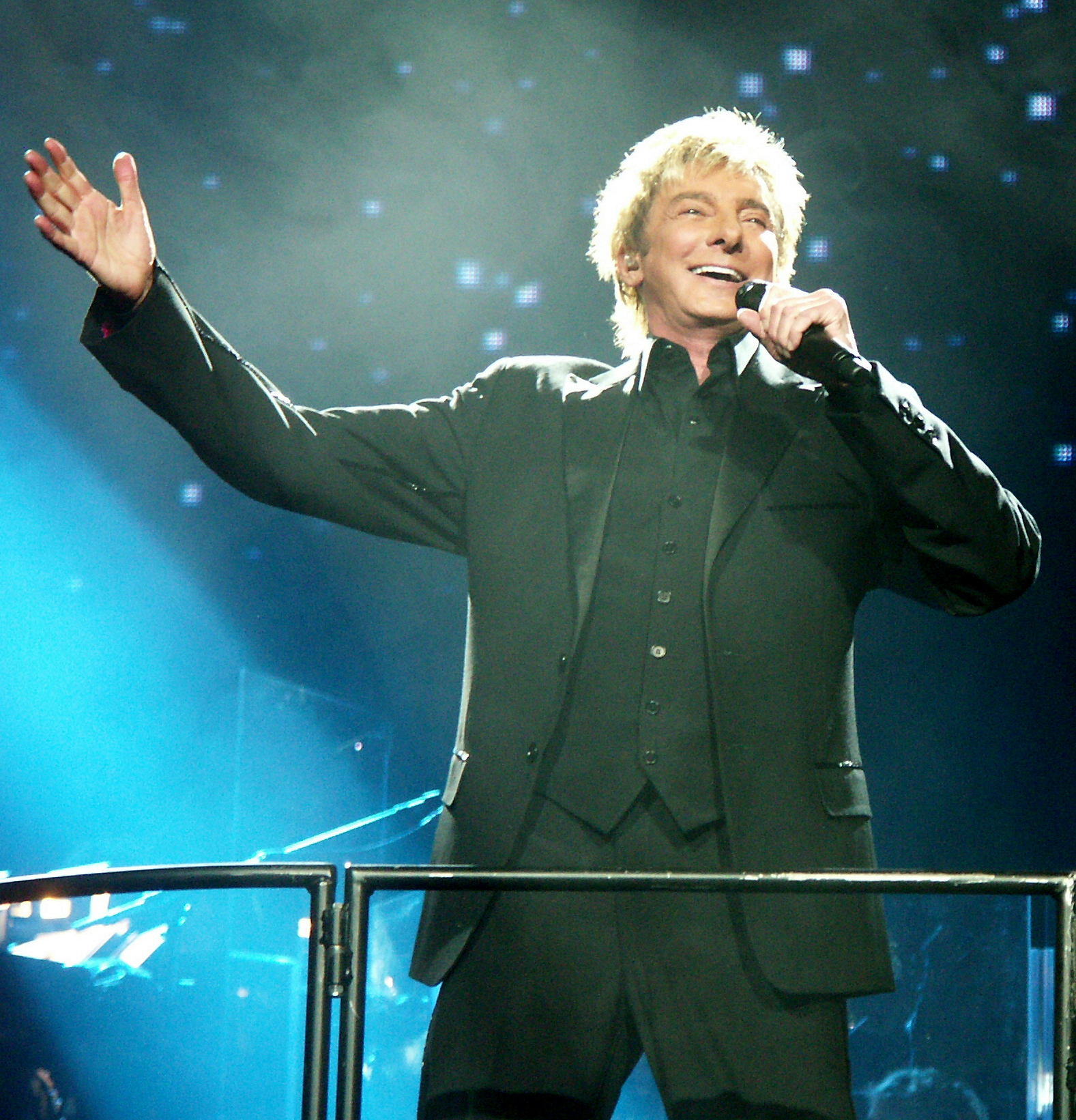
Barry Manilow

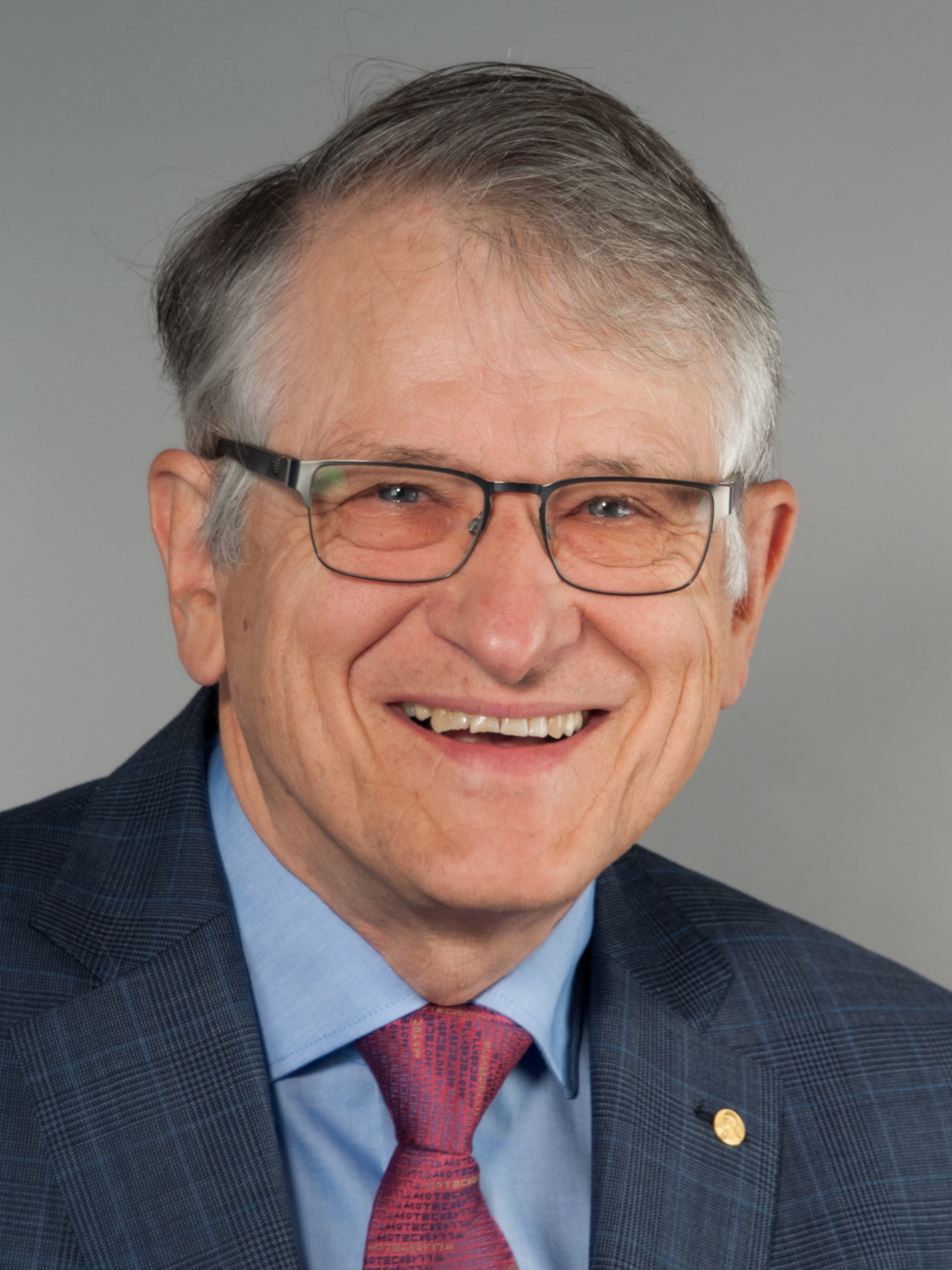
Klaus von Klitzing

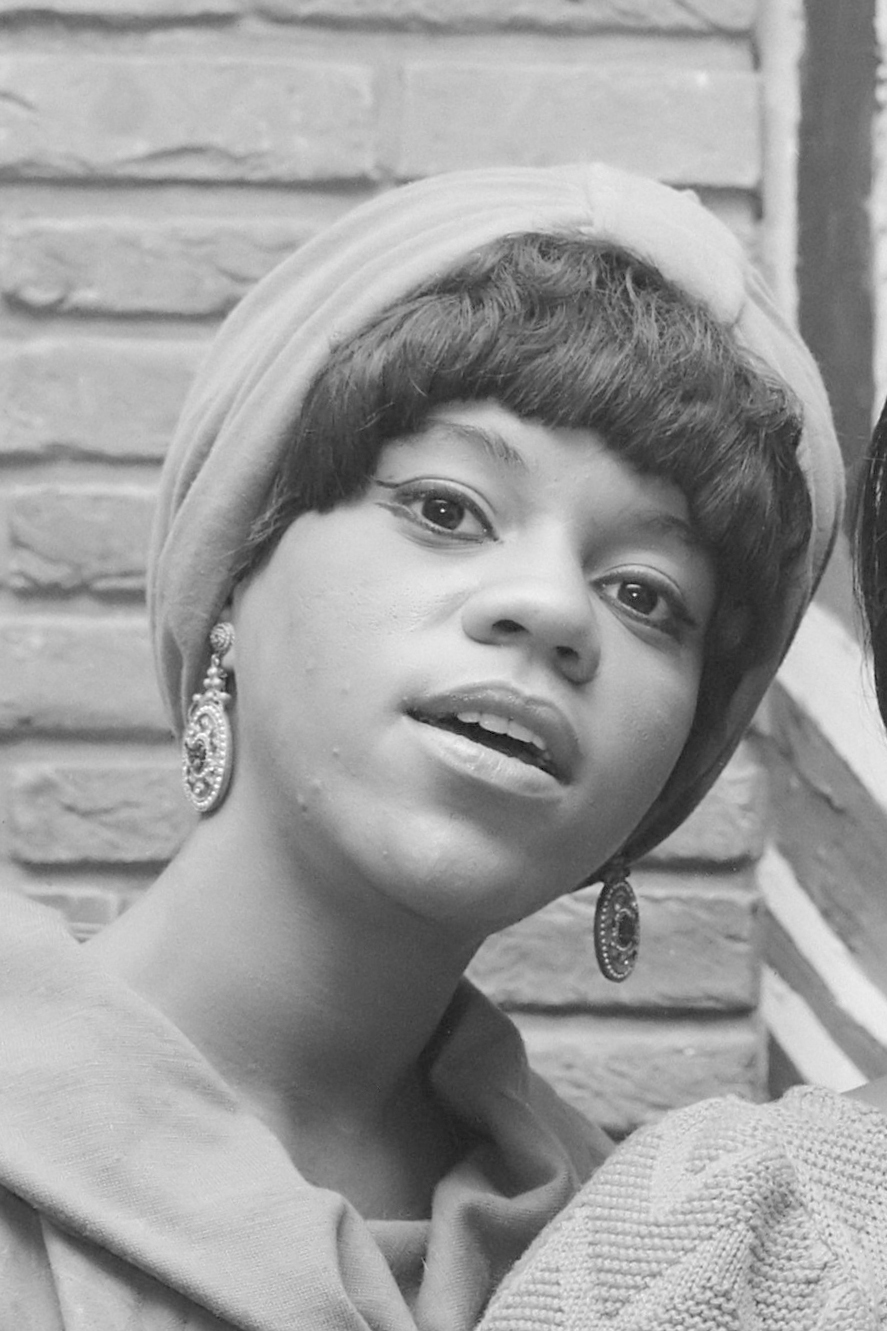
Florence Ballard

- June 1
  - Kuki Gallmann, Kenyan writer, poet
  - Richard Goode, American pianist
  - Lorrie Wilmot, South African cricketer (d. 2004)
- June 2 – Ilayaraaja, Indian composer
- June 3
  - John Burgess, Australian game show host, actor
  - Billy Cunningham, American basketball player and coach
- June 4 – Joyce Meyer, Christian author, speaker
- June 6 – Richard Smalley, American chemist, Nobel Prize laureate (d. 2005)
- June 7
  - Chan Hung-lit, Hong Kong actor (d. 2009)
  - Nikki Giovanni, American poet, writer, commentator, activist and educator (d. 2024)
  - Ken Osmond, American actor (d. 2020)
- June 8
  - Colin Baker, British actor
  - Şahan Arzruni, Armenian pianist
- June 11
  - Henry Hill, American gangster (d. 2012)
  - Oleg Vidov, Soviet Russian American actor (d. 2017)
- June 13 – Malcolm McDowell, English actor
- June 14
  - Eudoro Galindo, Bolivian businessman and politician (d. 2019)
  - Jim Sensenbrenner, American politician
- June 15
  - Johnny Hallyday, French pop singer, actor (d. 2017)
  - Poul Nyrup Rasmussen, 23rd Prime Minister of Denmark
- June 16
  - Raymond Ramazani Baya, Congolese politician (d. 2019)
  - Joan Van Ark, American actress
- June 17
  - Newt Gingrich, American politician, author and historian
  - Barry Manilow, American pop musician
- June 18
  - Raffaella Carrà, Italian singer, dancer and actress (d. 2021)
  - Barry Evans, English actor (d. 1997)
- June 21 – Marika Green, French-Swedish actress
- June 22
  - Klaus Maria Brandauer, Austrian actor
  - J. Michael Kosterlitz, Scottish-born condensed matter physicist, Nobel Prize laureate
- June 23
  - Patrick Bokanowski, French filmmaker
  - James Levine, American conductor (d. 2021)
  - Vint Cerf, American internet pioneer
- June 25
  - Carly Simon, American singer-songwriter
- June 26
  - John Beasley, American actor (d. 2023)
  - Warren Farrell, American educator, activist and author on gender issues
- June 27 – Rico Petrocelli, American baseball player
- June 28
  - Jens Birkemose, Danish painter
  - Klaus von Klitzing, German physicist, Nobel Prize laureate
- June 29
  - Maureen O'Brien, British actress
  - Leopold Grausam, Austrian footballer
  - Frank Zweerts, Dutch field hockey player
- June 30
  - Cees Kurpershoek, Dutch sailor
  - Daniel Kablan Duncan, Ivorian politician
  - Florence Ballard, African-American singer, founder of The Supremes (d. 1976)
  - Dieter Kottysch, West German Olympic boxer (d. 2017)
  - Dani Litani, Israeli musician and actor

=== July ===
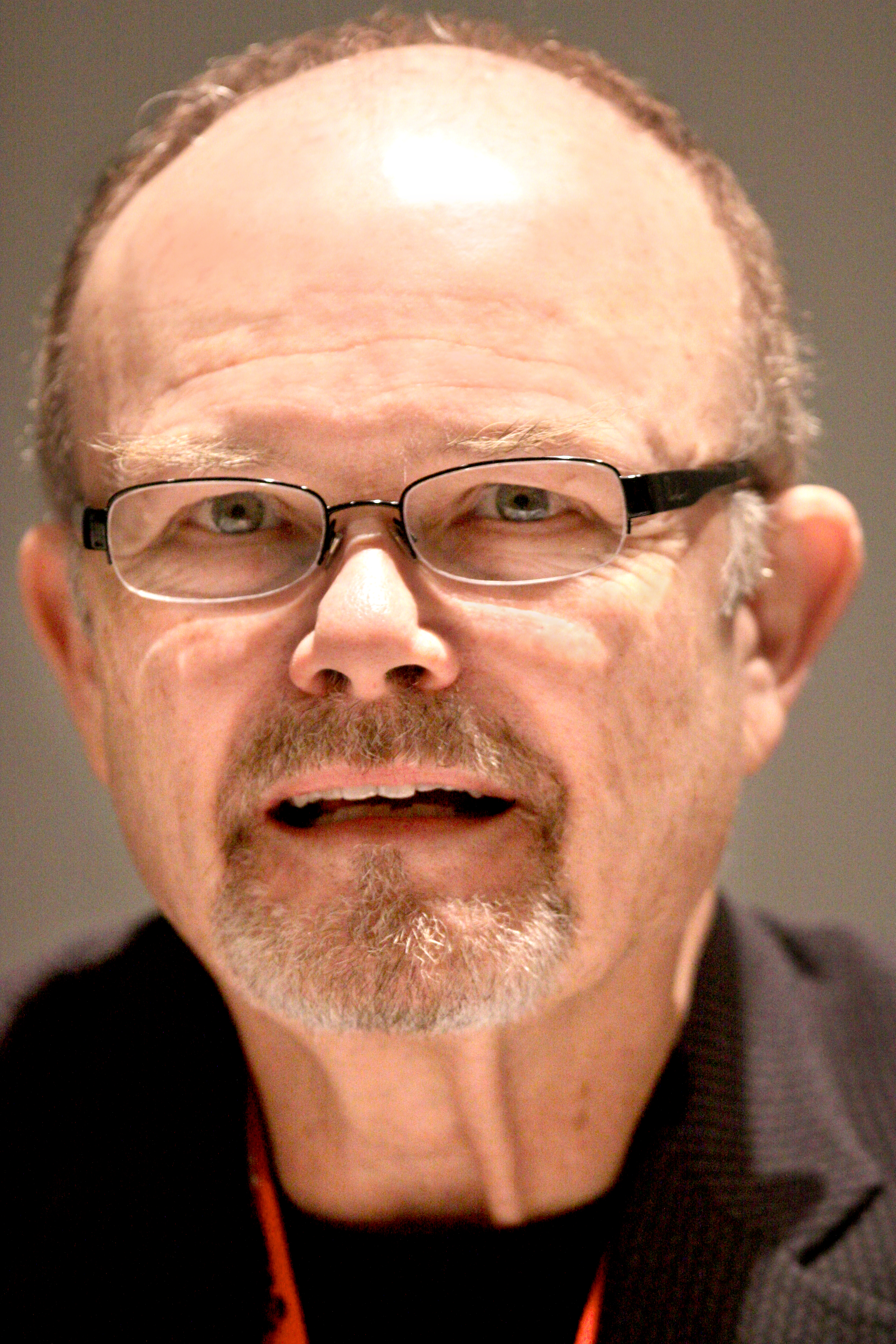
Kurtwood Smith

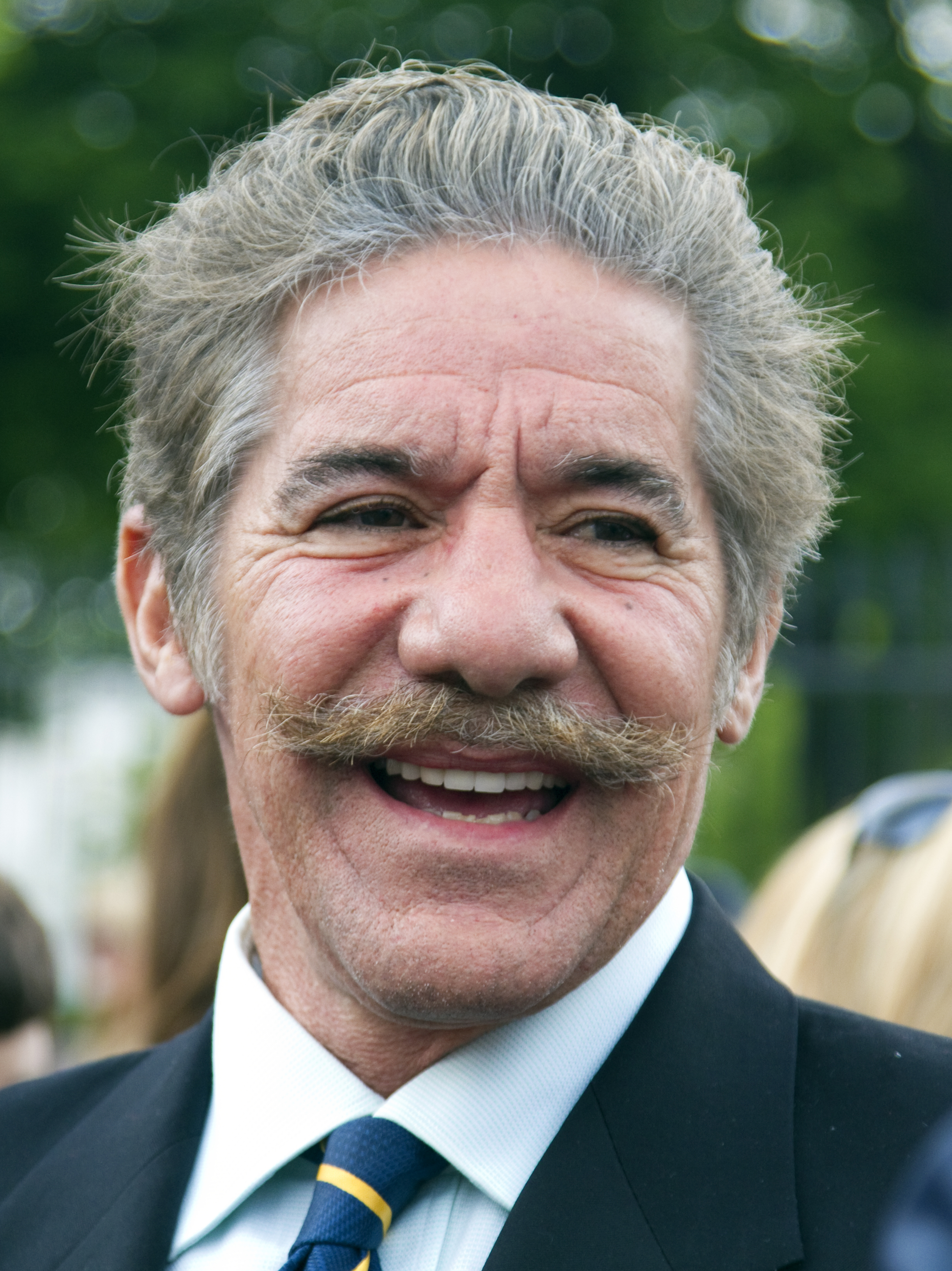
Geraldo Rivera

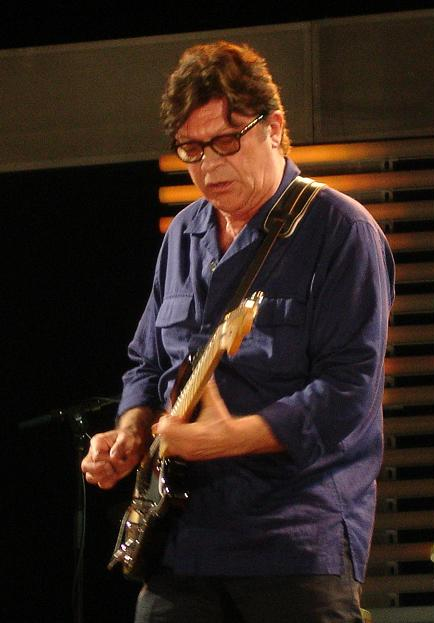
Robbie Robertson

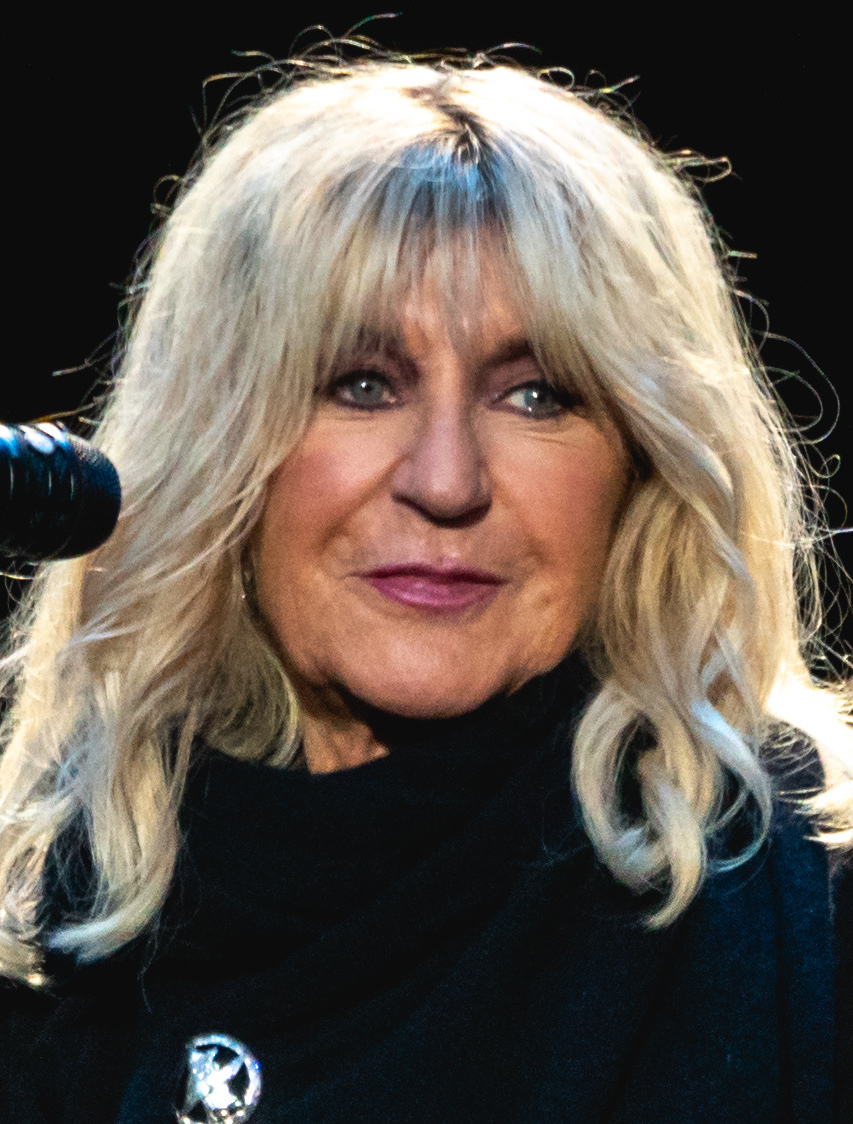
Christine McVie

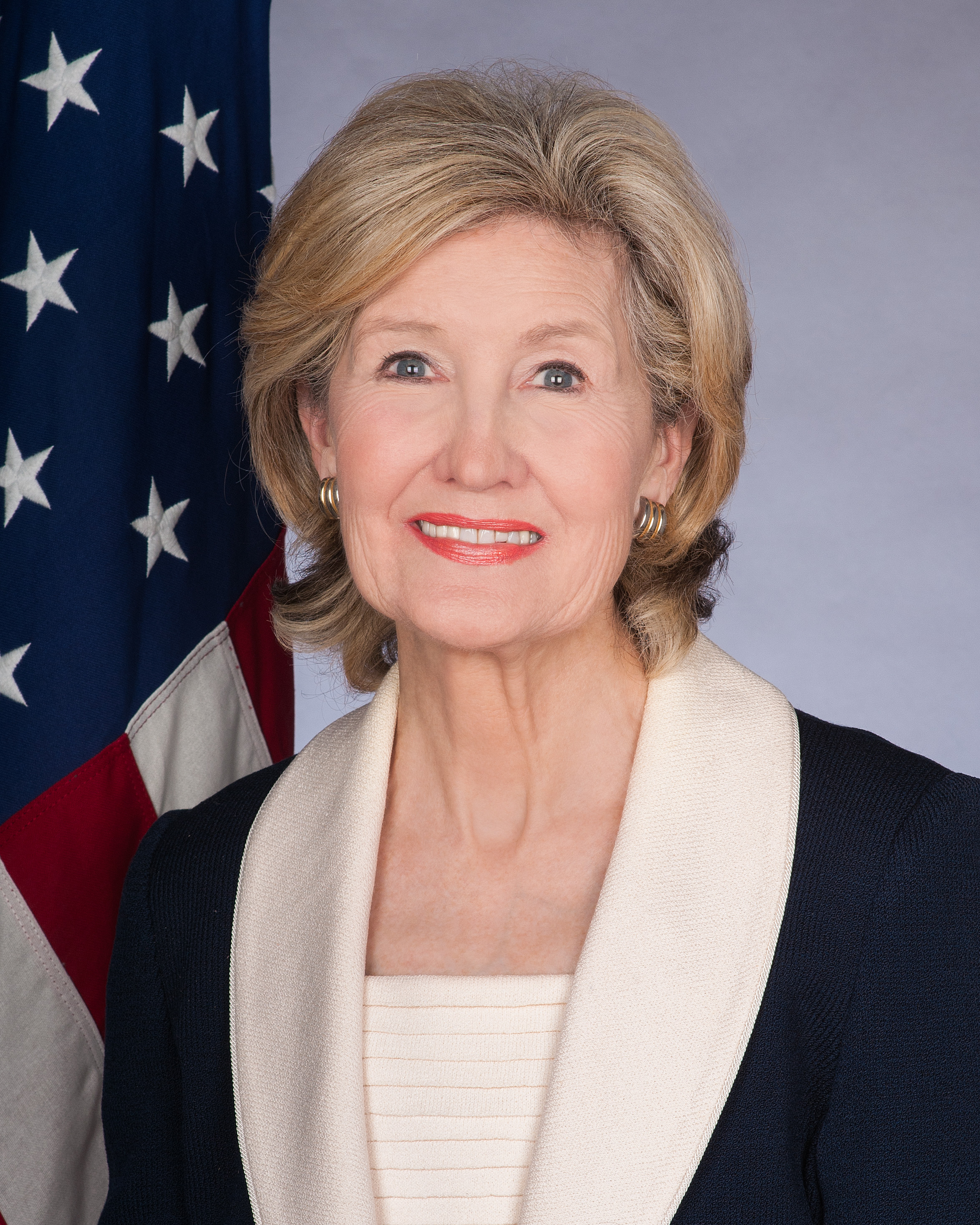
Kay Bailey Hutchison

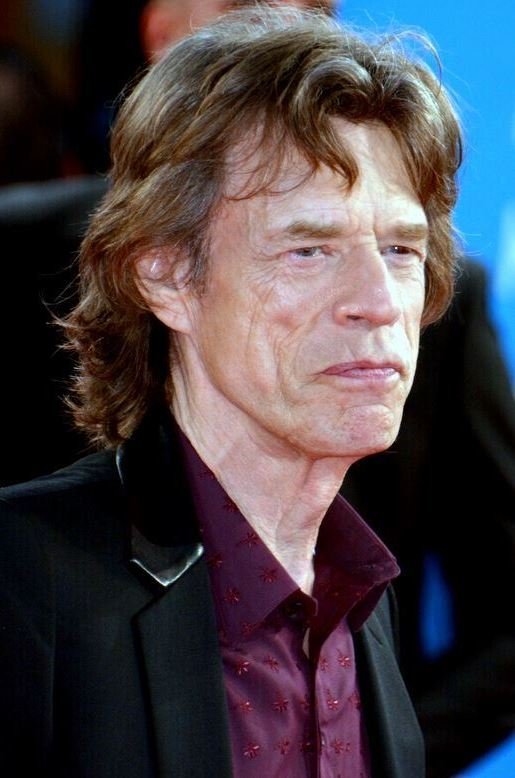
Mick Jagger

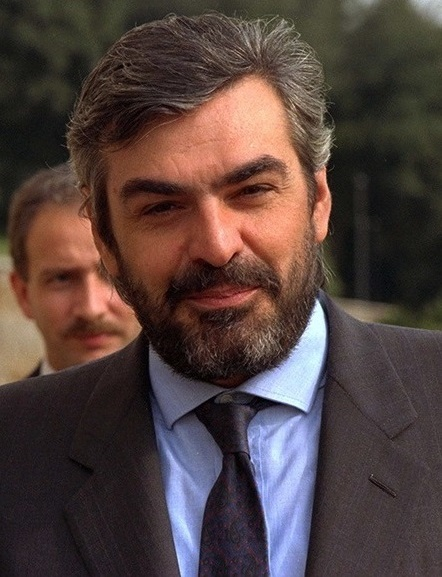
Giovanni Goria

- July 3
  - Judith Durham, folk pop singer (The Seekers) (d. 2022)
  - Kurtwood Smith, American actor (That '70s Show)
  - Norman Thagard, American astronaut
- July 4
  - Konrad "Conny" Bauer, German free jazz trombonist
  - Geraldo Rivera, American reporter, talk show host
  - Alan Wilson, American blues singer-songwriter (Canned Heat) (d. 1970)
- July 5
  - Curt Blefary, American baseball player (d. 2001)
  - István Gáli, Hungarian boxer
  - Robbie Robertson, Canadian folk rock songwriter and guitarist (The Band) (d. 2023)
- July 6
  - Rosemary Forsyth, Canadian-American actress, model
  - Muhammad Iqbal Gujjar, Pakistani politician
  - Kim Kye-gwan, North Korean diplomat
  - Tamara Sinyavskaya, Russian mezzo-soprano
- July 7
  - Jürgen Geschke, German track cyclist
  - M. Karathu, Malaysian football player, manager
  - Robert East, Welsh theatre, TV actor
  - Joel Siegel, American film critic (d. 2007)
  - Miguel Vila Luna, Dominican architect, painter (d. 2005)
- July 8
  - Guido Marzulli, Italian painter
  - Carmine Preziosi, Italian road bicycle racer
- July 9
  - Suzanne Rogers, American actress
  - Soledad Miranda, Spanish actress (d. 1970)
- July 10
  - Arthur Ashe, African-American tennis player (d. 1993)
  - Inonge Mbikusita-Lewanika, Zambian politician
- July 11
  - Edna Madzongwe, Zimbabwean politician
  - Tom Holland, American screenwriter, actor and filmmaker
  - Luciano Onder, Italian journalist
- July 12
  - Christine McVie, British musician (Fleetwood Mac) (d. 2022)
  - Walter Murch, American film editor, sound designer
- July 14
  - George Thomas Coker, United States Navy commander
  - Harold Wheeler, American orchestrator, composer, conductor, arranger, record producer and music director
  - David Burden, British Army officer
- July 15 – Jocelyn Bell Burnell, British astrophysicist
- July 16 – Reinaldo Arenas, Cuban writer (d. 1990)
- July 17
  - Shlomo Ben-Ami, Israeli diplomat, politician and historian
  - Alfredo Mantica, Italian politician
- July 18 – Jerry Chambers, American basketball player
- July 19
  - Carla Mazzuca Poggiolini, Italian journalist and politician
  - David Griffin, British actor
- July 20
  - Christopher Murney, American actor, vocal artist
  - Wendy Richard, British actress (d. 2009)
- July 21
  - Michael Caton, Australian actor, comedian and television presenter
  - Edward Herrmann, American actor (d. 2014)
  - Henry McCullough, Northern Irish musician (Paul McCartney & Wings) (d. 2016)
  - Bob Shrum, American political consultant
- July 22 – Kay Bailey Hutchison, American attorney, television correspondent, politician and diplomat
- July 23
  - Tony Joe White, American singer, songwriter and guitarist (d. 2018)
  - Zvonimir Vujin, Serbian amateur boxer (d. 2019)
  - Bob Hilton, American game show host
- July 24 – John Bryson, American businessman and Former 37th US Secretary of Commerce (2011–12)
- July 25 – Erika Steinbach, German politician
- July 26
  - Mick Jagger, English rock singer (The Rolling Stones)
  - Andrea True, American disco singer (d. 2011)
- July 28
  - Mike Bloomfield, American guitarist and composer (d. 1981)
  - Bill Bradley, American basketball player and politician
  - Richard Wright, British musician (d. 2008)
- July 29 – Bob Brunning, British musician (d. 2011)
- July 30 – Giovanni Goria, Prime Minister of Italy (d. 1994)

=== August ===
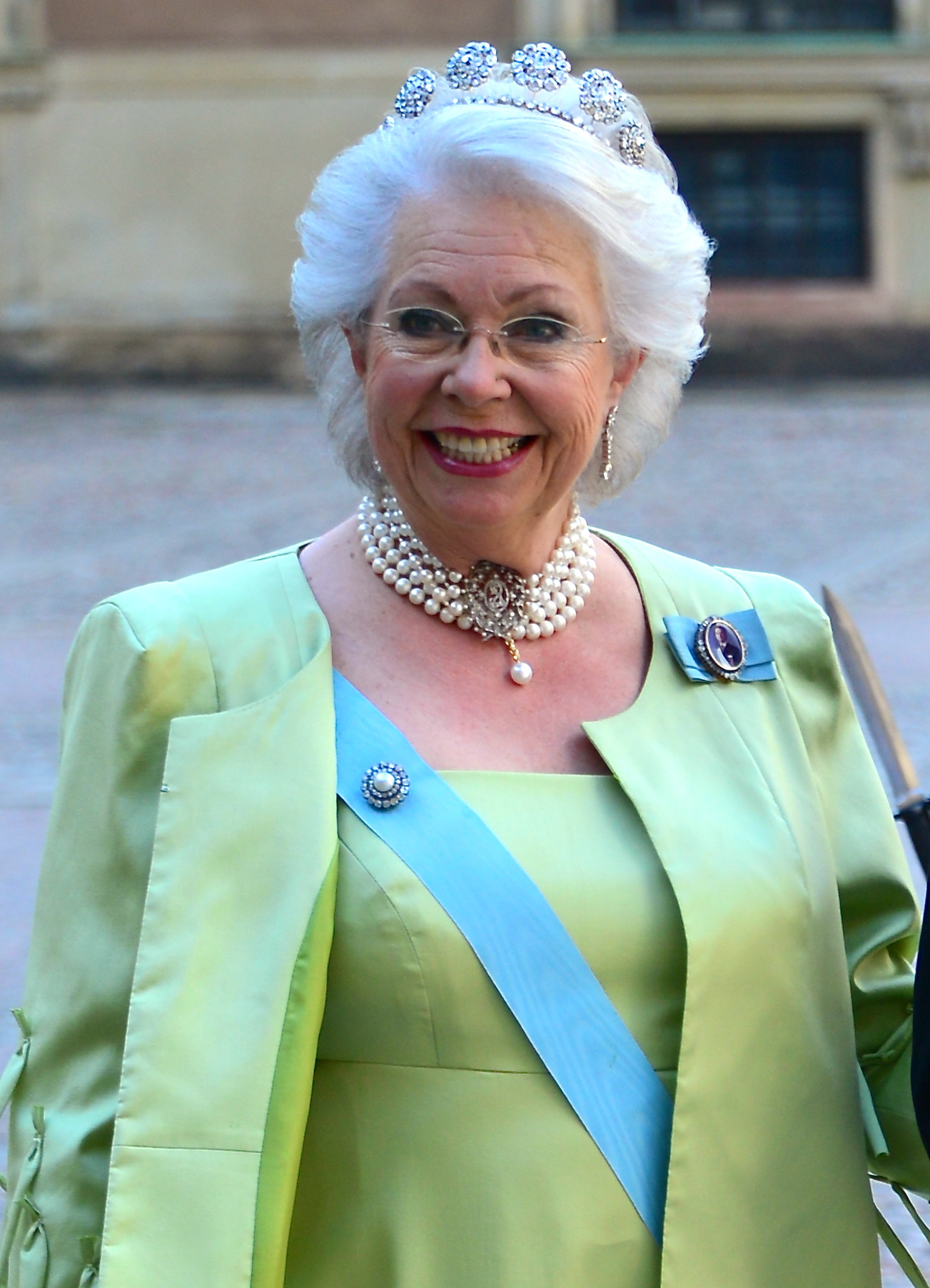
Princess Christina of Sweden

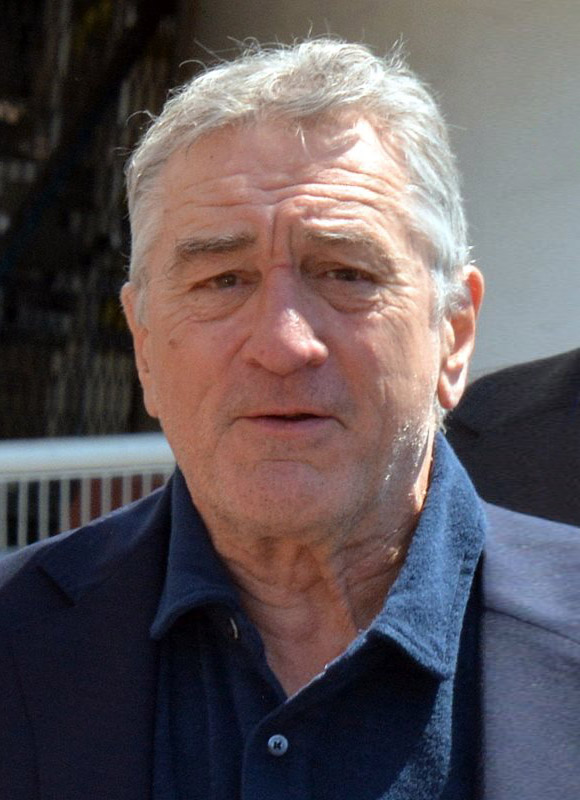
Robert De Niro

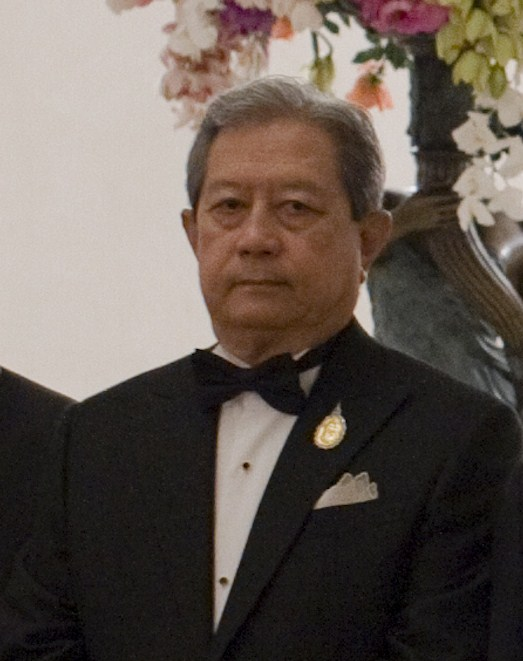
Surayud Chulanont

- August 2 – Max Wright, American actor (d. 2019)
- August 3
  - Princess Christina of Sweden
  - Clarence Wijewardena, Sri Lankan musician (d. 1996)
- August 4
  - Barbara Saß-Viehweger, German politician, lawyer and civil law notary
  - Bjørn Wirkola, Norwegian ski jumper
- August 5 – Nelson Briles, American baseball player (d. 2005)
- August 6 – Jim Hardin, American baseball pitcher (Baltimore Orioles, New York Yankees, Atlanta Braves) (d. 1991)
- August 8 – Luc Rosenzweig, French journalist (d. 2018)
- August 9 – Ken Norton, African-American boxer, actor (d. 2013)
- August 10
  - Louis E. Brus, American chemist, Nobel Prize laureate (d. 2026)
  - Frédéric Kyburz, Swiss judoka (d. 2018)
  - Ronnie Spector, American singer (The Ronettes) (d. 2022)
- August 11
  - Abigail Folger, American heiress, murder victim (d. 1969)
  - Pervez Musharraf, Pakistani general, leader and 10th President of Pakistan (d. 2023)
- August 13 – Roberto Micheletti, President of Honduras
- August 15 – Glória Maria, Brazilian journalist, reporter and television host
- August 17
  - Robert De Niro, American actor
  - Yukio Kasaya, Japanese ski jumper
- August 18
  - Martin Mull, American actor and comedian (d. 2024)
  - Gianni Rivera, Italian footballer
- August 19 – Edwin Hawkins, African-American gospel musician, pianist (d. 2018)
- August 20 – Sylvester McCoy, Scottish actor
- August 22 – Nahas Angula, Prime Minister of Namibia
- August 23
  - Rodney Alcala, American serial killer, kidnapper, and rapist (d. 2021)
  - Pino Presti, Italian bassist, arranger, composer, conductor, record producer
- August 27 – Tuesday Weld, American actress
- August 28
  - Surayud Chulanont, Thai politician, 24th Prime Minister of Thailand
  - Lou Piniella, American baseball player, manager
  - Jihad Al-Atrash, Lebanese actor, voice actor
- August 29 – Arthur B. McDonald, Canadian astrophysicist, Nobel Prize laureate
- August 30
  - Tal Brody, American-born Israeli basketball player
  - R. Crumb, American artist, illustrator
  - Altovise Davis, American entertainer (d. 2009)
  - Jean-Claude Killy, French skier
  - John Kani, South African actor
- August 31 – Leonid Ivashov, Russian general

=== September ===
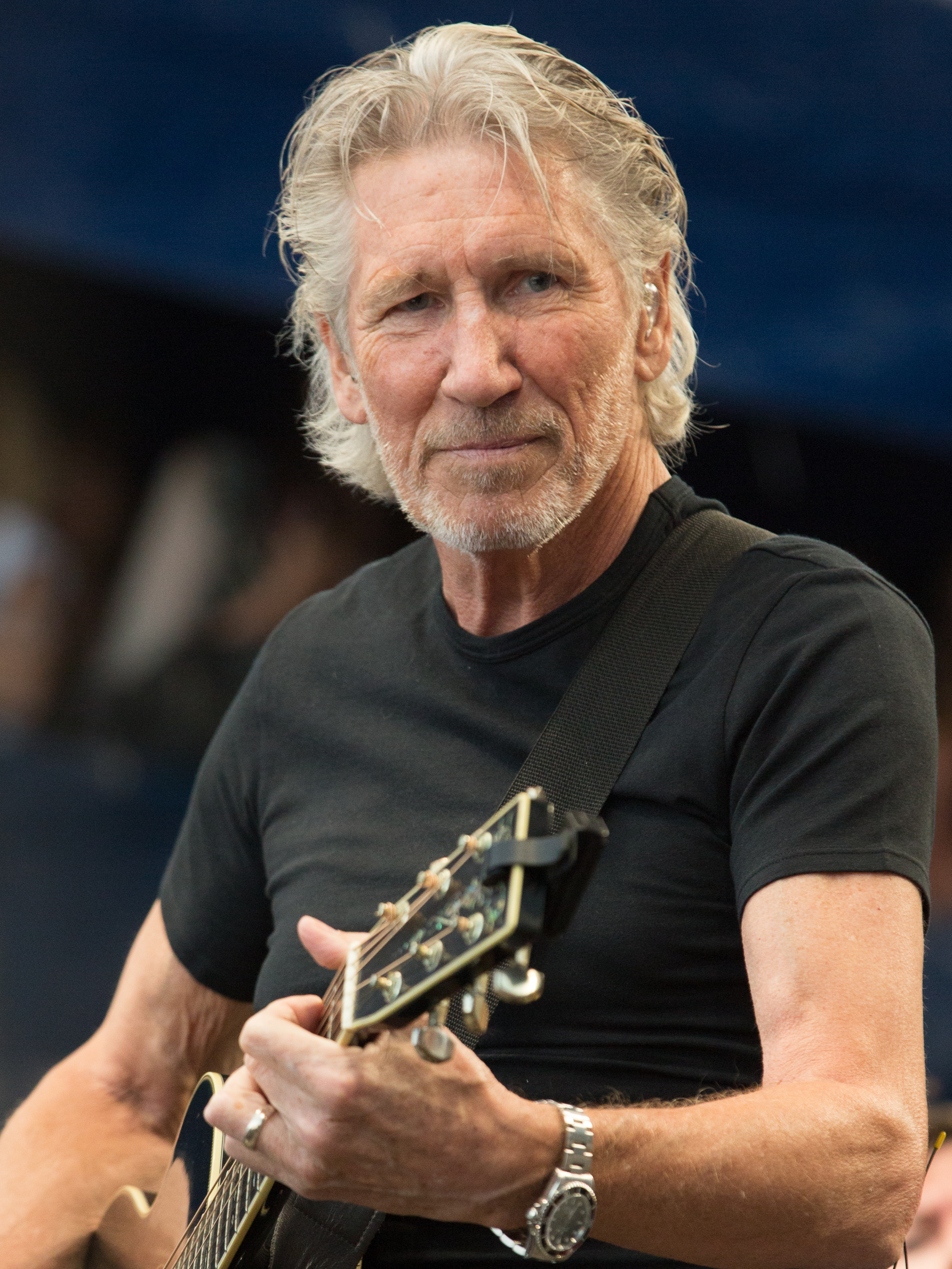
Roger Waters

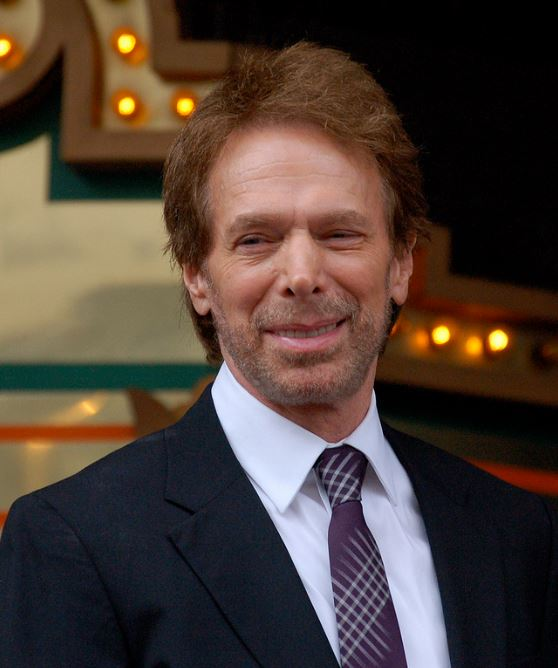
Jerry Bruckheimer

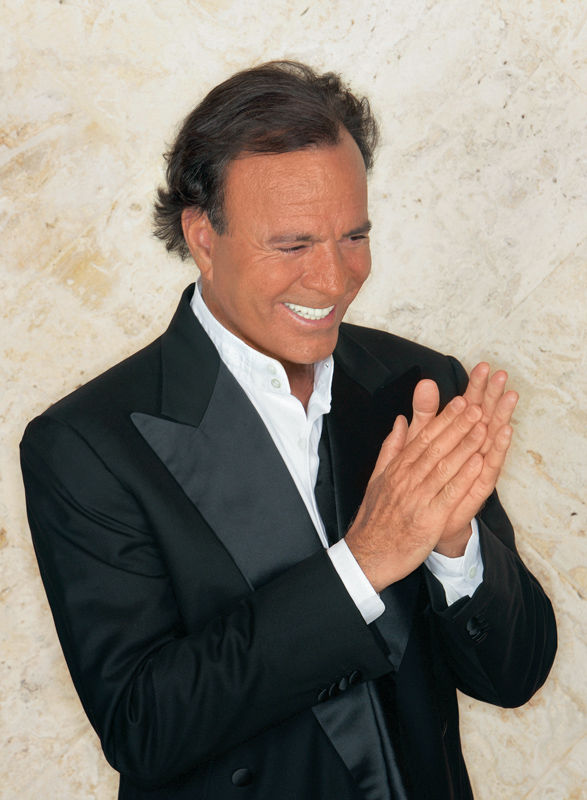
Julio Iglesias

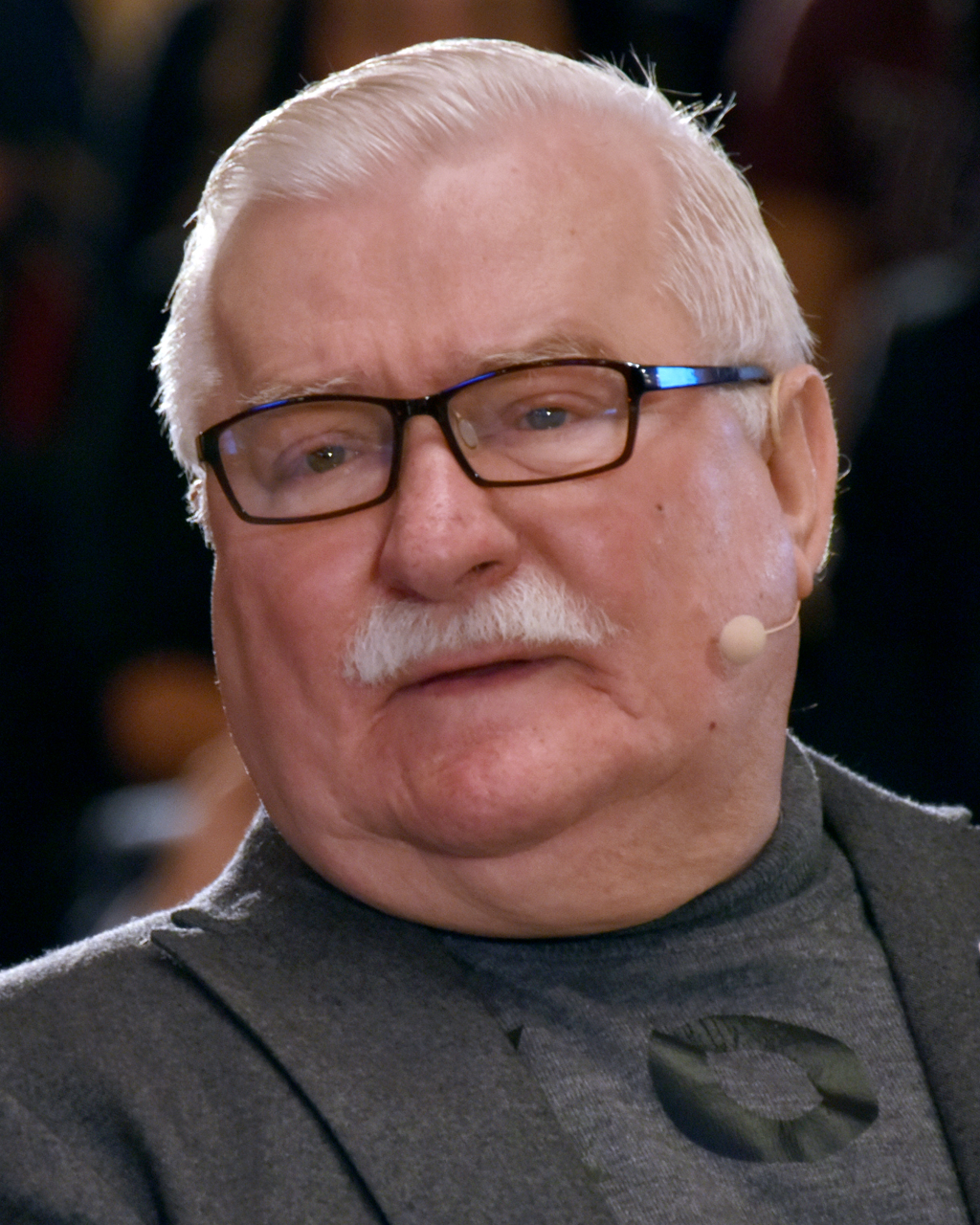
Lech Wałęsa

- September 5 – Dulce Saguisag, Filipino politician, former DSWD Secretary (d. 2007)
- September 6
  - Harris Hines, American judge (d. 2018)
  - Richard J. Roberts, English biochemist, molecular biologist and recipient of the Nobel Prize in Physiology or Medicine
  - Roger Waters, English musician (Pink Floyd)
- September 7
  - Lena Valaitis, Lithuanian-German Schlager singer
  - Gloria Gaynor, American disco singer
- September 9 – Art LaFleur, American actor (d. 2021)
- September 10
  - Daniel Truhitte, American actor
  - Neale Donald Walsch, American author (Conversations with God)
- September 11
  - Mickey Hart, American percussionist and musicologist (Grateful Dead)
  - Jaime Thorne León, Peruvian politician (d. 2018)
  - Gilbert Proesch, Italian-born artist (Gilbert and George)
  - Raymond Villeneuve, Canadian terrorist
- September 13 – Mildred D. Taylor, American writer
- September 14
  - Irwin Goodman, Finnish singer (d. 1991)
  - Tunde Idiagbon, Nigerian Army major general (d. 1999)
- September 16
  - Tadamasa Goto, Japanese yakuza boss
  - Oskar Lafontaine, German politician
- September 18 – Nina Wayne, American actress
- September 19 – Joe Morgan, American baseball player (d. 2020)
- September 20 – Sani Abacha, Nigerian Army officer and dictator (d. 1998)
- September 21
  - Jerry Bruckheimer, American film and television producer
  - David Hood, American session bassist and trombone player
  - Mathew Prichard, British philanthropist, the only child of literary guardian Rosalind Hicks and the only grandchild of author Agatha Christie
- September 22 – Toni Basil, American musician, video artist ("Mickey")
- September 23
  - Ernie Ackerley, British footballer (d. 2017)
  - Julio Iglesias, Spanish singer, songwriter
  - Tanuja, Indian actress
- September 28 – J. T. Walsh, American actor (d. 1998)
- September 29
  - Wolfgang Overath, German footballer
  - Lech Wałęsa, President of Poland, recipient of the Nobel Peace Prize
- September 30
  - Johann Deisenhofer, German biochemist, Nobel Prize laureate
  - Ian Ogilvy, British-American actor

=== October ===
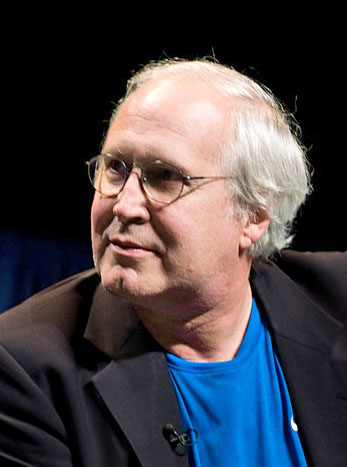
Chevy Chase

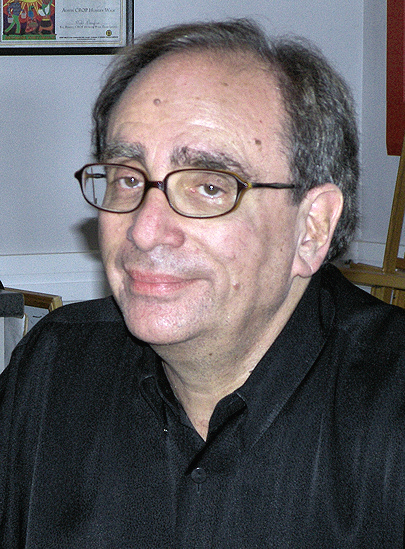
R.L. Stine

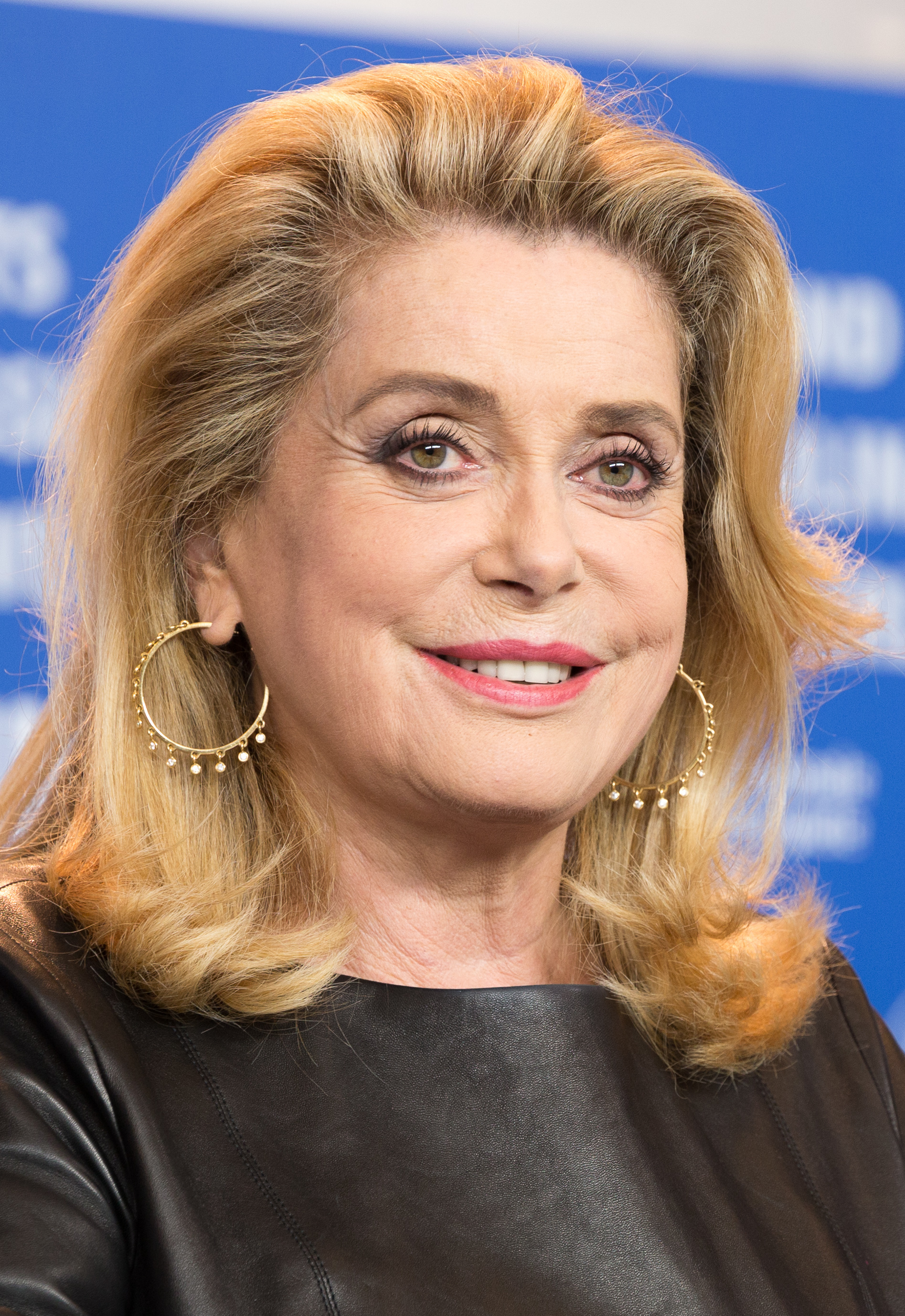
Catherine Deneuve

- October 1
  - Jerry Martini, American musician
  - Naushad Ali, Pakistani cricketer
  - Jean-Jacques Annaud, French film director
- October 2
  - Franklin Rosemont, American poet (d. 2009)
  - Henri Szeps, Australian actor
- October 3 – Jeff Bingaman, American politician
- October 4 – Buddy Roemer, American politician, investor and banker (d. 2021)
- October 5
  - Bonnie Bryant, American golfer
  - Ben Cardin, American politician
  - Inna Churikova, Soviet and Russian film and theatre actress (d. 2023)
- October 6 – Michael Durrell, American actor
- October 7 – Oliver North, American military officer, military historian, political commentator, author and television host
- October 8
  - Chevy Chase, American comedian, actor (Saturday Night Live)
  - R. L. Stine, American novelist (Goosebumps)
- October 9 - James Robison, American televangelist
- October 11
  - John Nettles, English actor, writer
  - Gene Watson, American country singer
- October 12
  - Jeffrey R. MacDonald, American physician and United States Army Officer
  - Köbi Kuhn, Swiss footballer and manager (d. 2019)
- October 14
  - Lois Hamilton, American model, actress and artist (d. 1999)
  - Mohammad Khatami, 5th President of Iran
  - Lance Rentzel, American football player
- October 15 – Penny Marshall, American actress, director and producer (d. 2018)
- October 18
  - Birthe Rønn Hornbech, Danish politician
  - Christine Charbonneau, Canadian francophone singer, songwriter (d. 2014)
- October 22 – Catherine Deneuve, French actress
- October 24
  - Theodor Stolojan, 54th Prime Minister of Romania
  - José E. Serrano, American politician
- October 25 – Roy Lynes, English keyboardist
- October 27 – Carmen Argenziano, American actor (d. 2019)
- October 28 – Cornelia Froboess, German actress
- October 29 – Don Simpson, American film producer, screenwriter and actor (d. 1996)

=== November ===
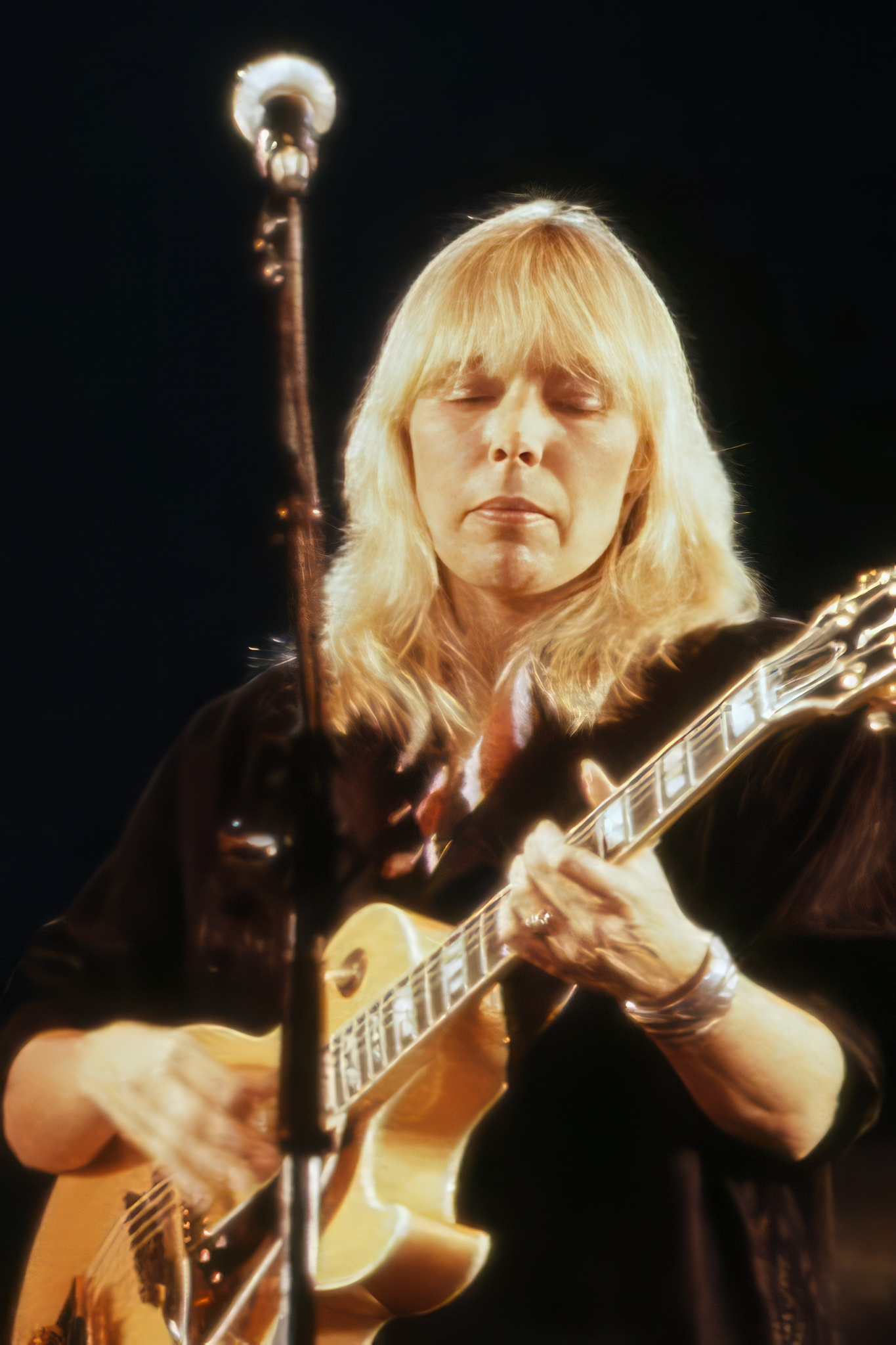
Joni Mitchell

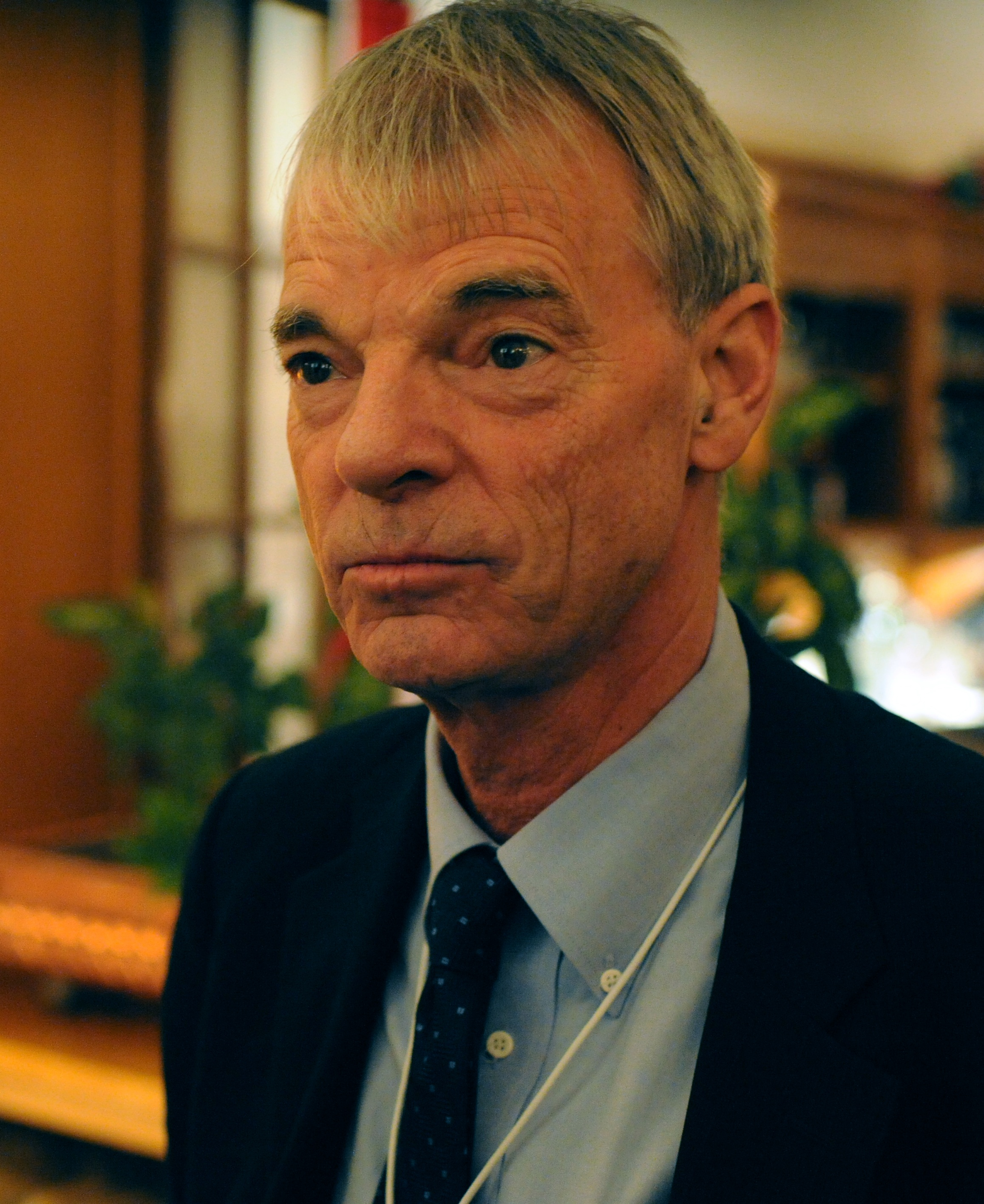
Michael Spence

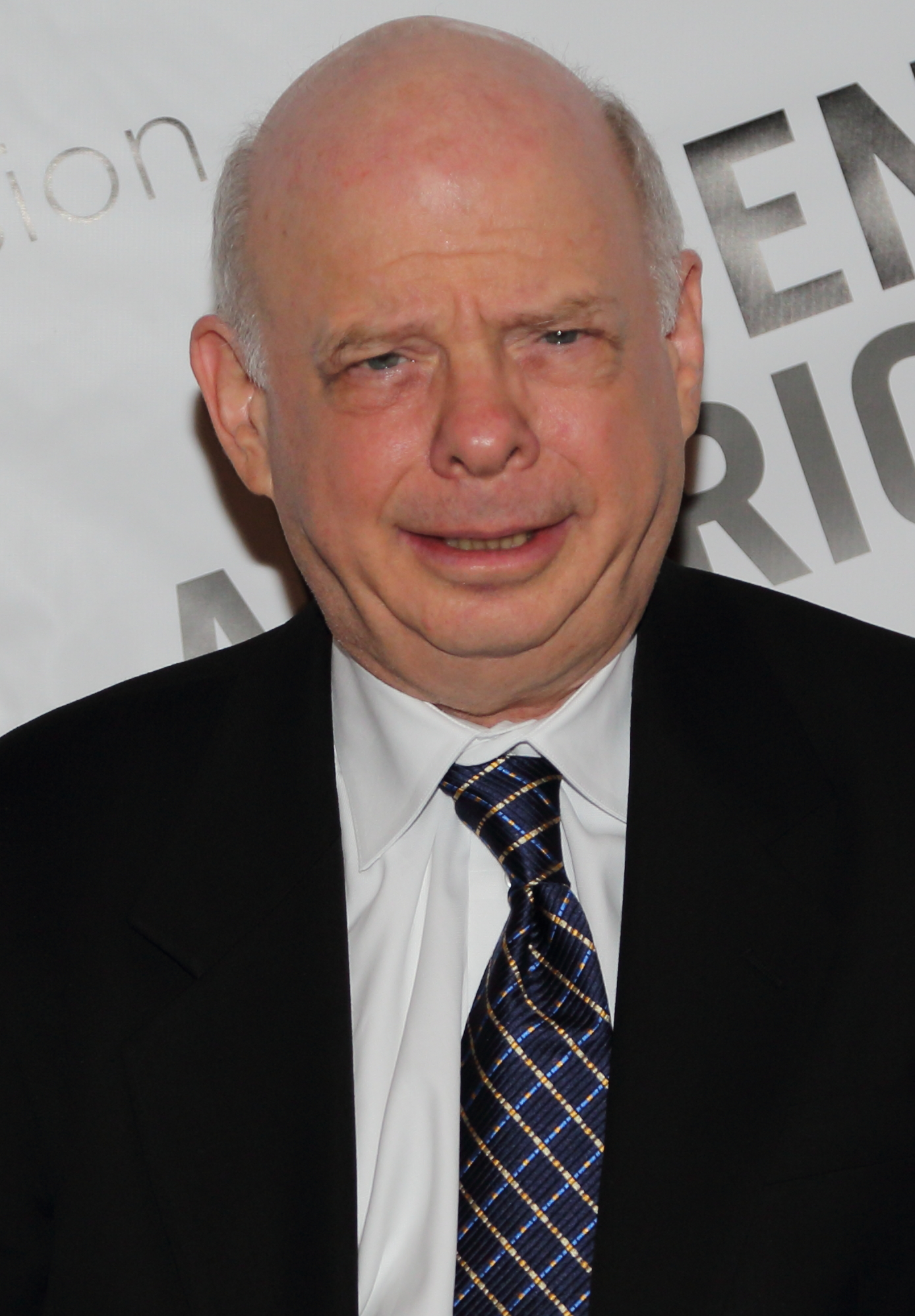
Wallace Shawn

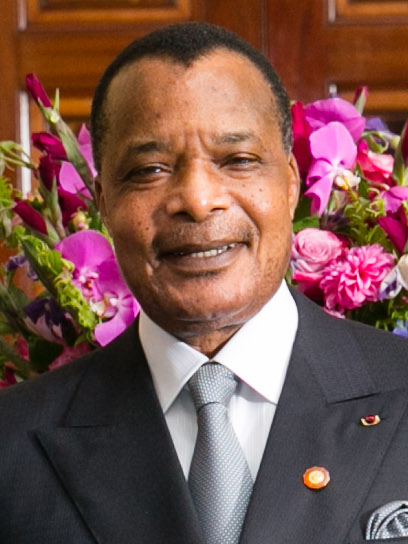
Denis Sassou Nguesso

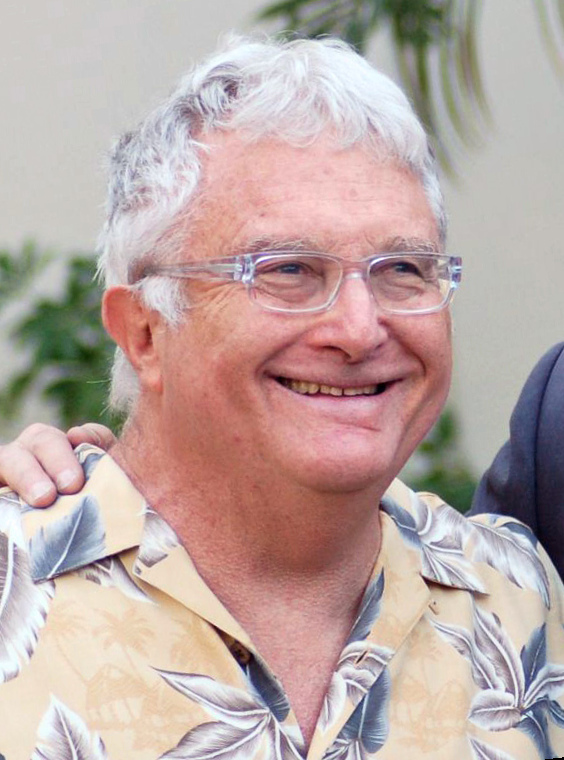
Randy Newman

- November 1 – Jacques Attali, French economist
- November 3 – Bert Jansch, Scottish folk musician (d. 2011)
- November 4
  - Sundar Popo, Indo-Trinidadian chutney musician (d. 2000)
  - Chuck Scarborough, American news anchor
- November 5
  - Friedman Paul Erhardt, German-American pioneering television chef (d. 2007)
  - Sam Shepard, American playwright, actor (d. 2017)
- November 7
  - Stephen Greenblatt, American literary critic
  - Nasirdin Isanov, 1st Prime Minister of Kyrgyzstan (d. 1991)
  - Joni Mitchell, Canadian musician (Big Yellow Taxi)
  - Michael Spence, American economist, Nobel Prize laureate
- November 8 – Martin Peters, English footballer (d. 2019)
- November 11 – Doug Frost, Australian swimming coach
- November 12 – Wallace Shawn, American actor
- November 13
  - Roberto Boninsegna, Italian footballer
  - Jay Sigel, American golfer
- November 14
  - Peter Norton, American software engineer, businessman
  - Rafael Leonardo Callejas, President of Honduras (d. 2020)
- November 17 – Lauren Hutton, American actress, model
- November 19 – Aurelio Monteagudo, Cuban Major League Baseball player (d. 1990)
- November 20
  - Mie Hama, Japanese actress
  - Marek Tomaszewski, Polish pianist
- November 21 – Larry Mahan, American rodeo cowboy
- November 22
  - Peter Adair, American filmmaker (d. 1996)
  - Yvan Cournoyer, Canadian ice hockey player
  - Billie Jean King, American tennis player
  - William Kotzwinkle, American novelist, screenwriter
  - Fouad Siniora, 32nd Prime Minister of Lebanon
- November 23
  - Denis Sassou Nguesso, President of the Republic of the Congo
  - Andrew Goodman
- November 24
  - Dave Bing, American mayor, longtime NBA player
  - Kuniwo Nakamura, 6th President of Palau (d. 2020)
- November 25 – Dante Caputo, Argentine diplomat, politician (d. 2018)
- November 26 – Marilynne Robinson, American writer
- November 28
  - Randy Newman, American musician
  - Susan Brookes, British television chef
- November 30 – Terrence Malick, American film director

=== December ===
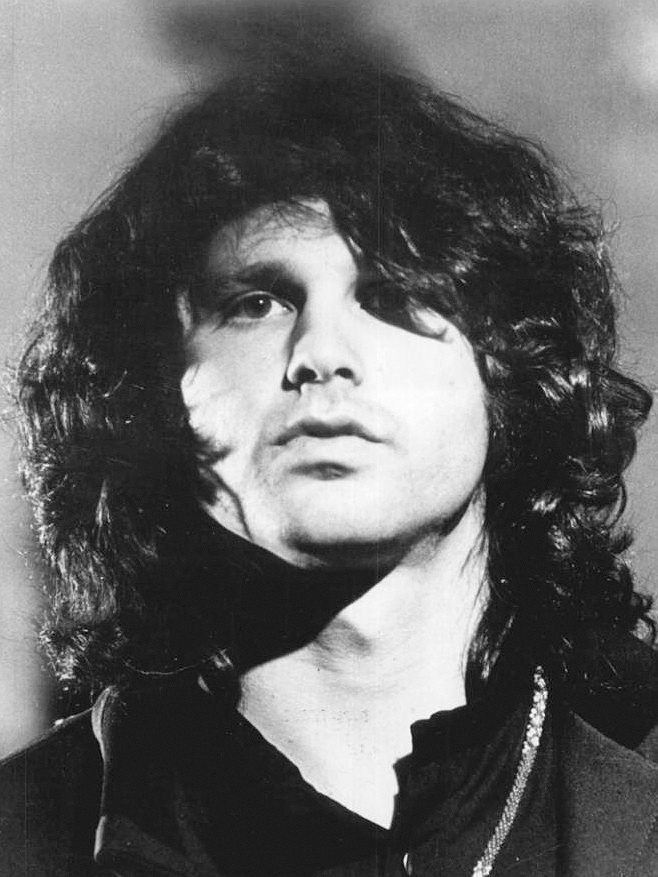
Jim Morrison

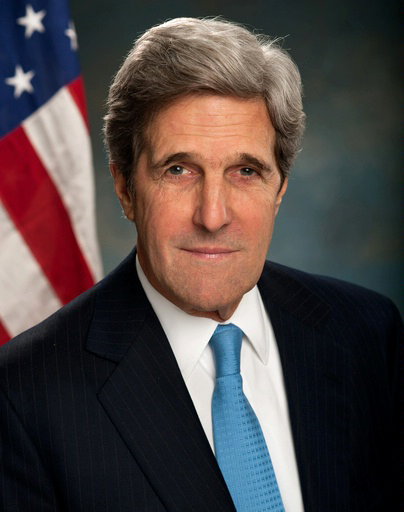
John Kerry

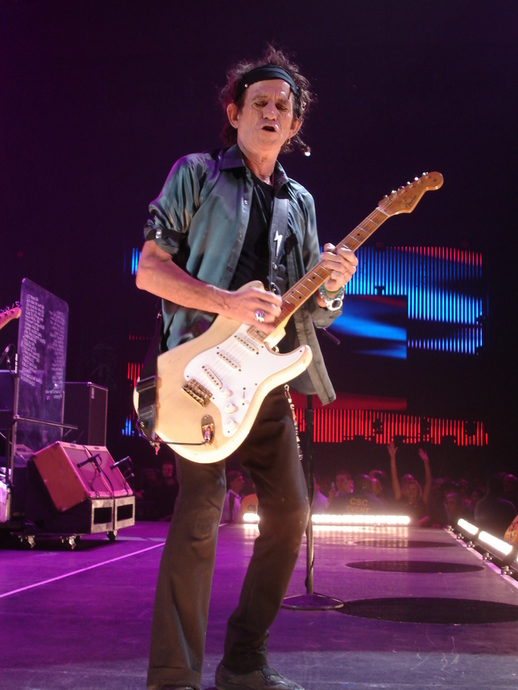
Keith Richards

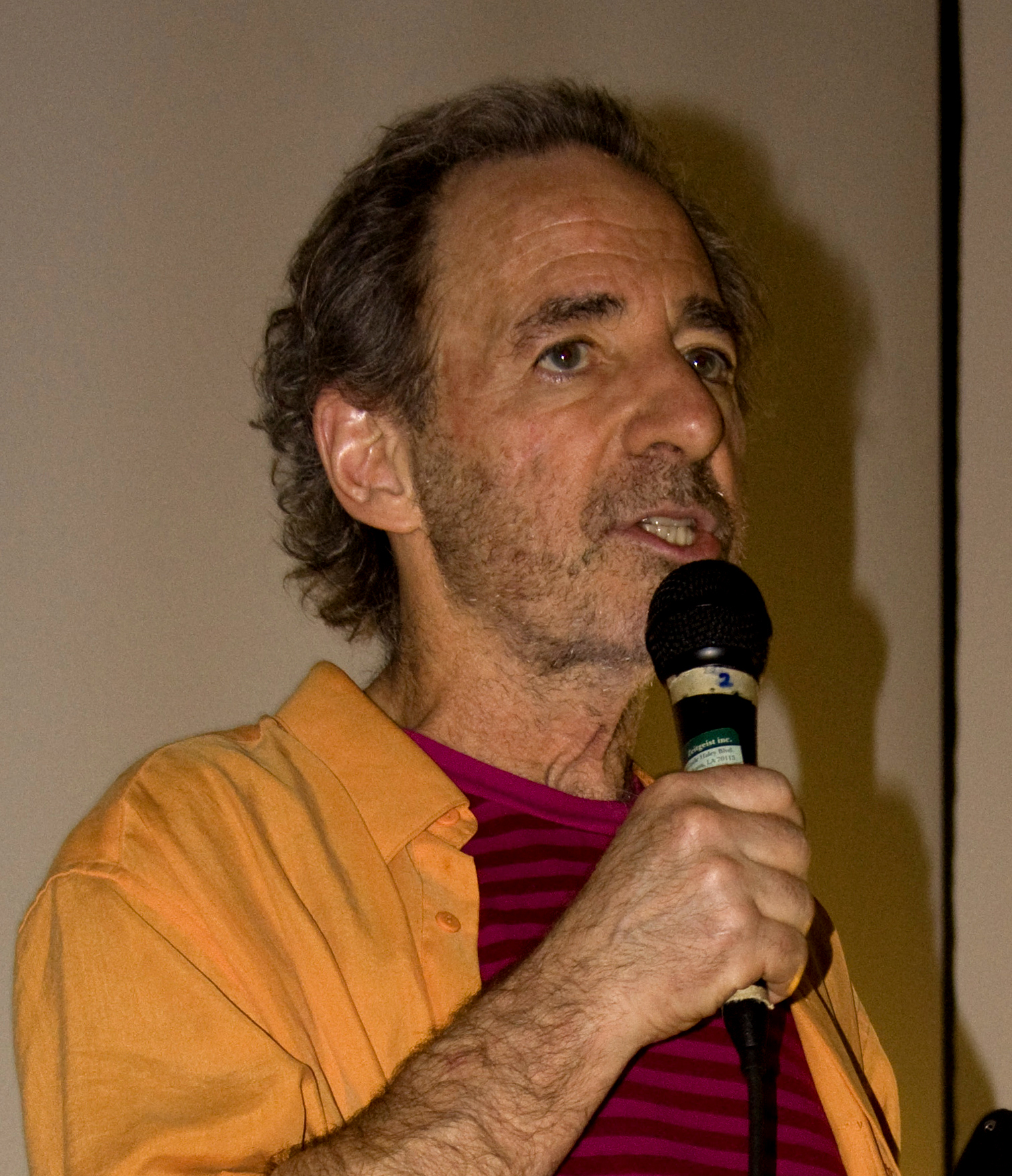
Harry Shearer

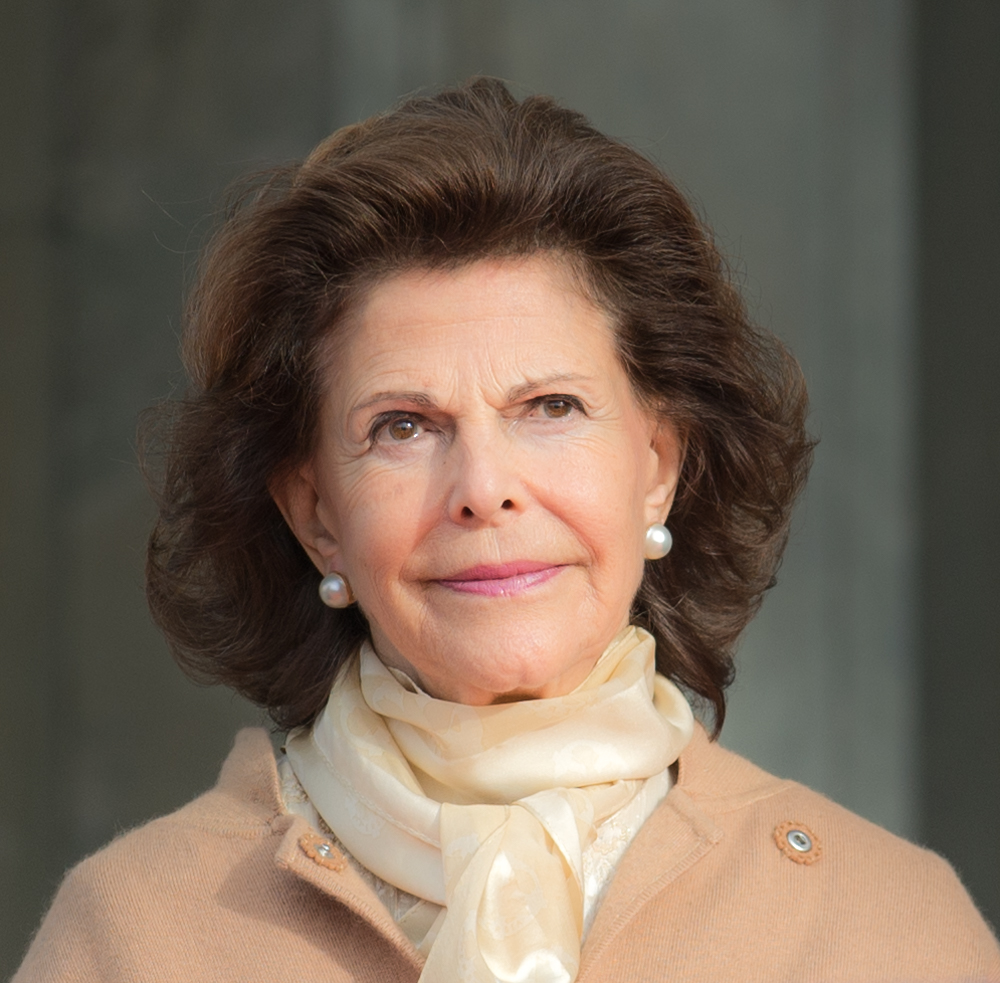
Queen Silvia of Sweden

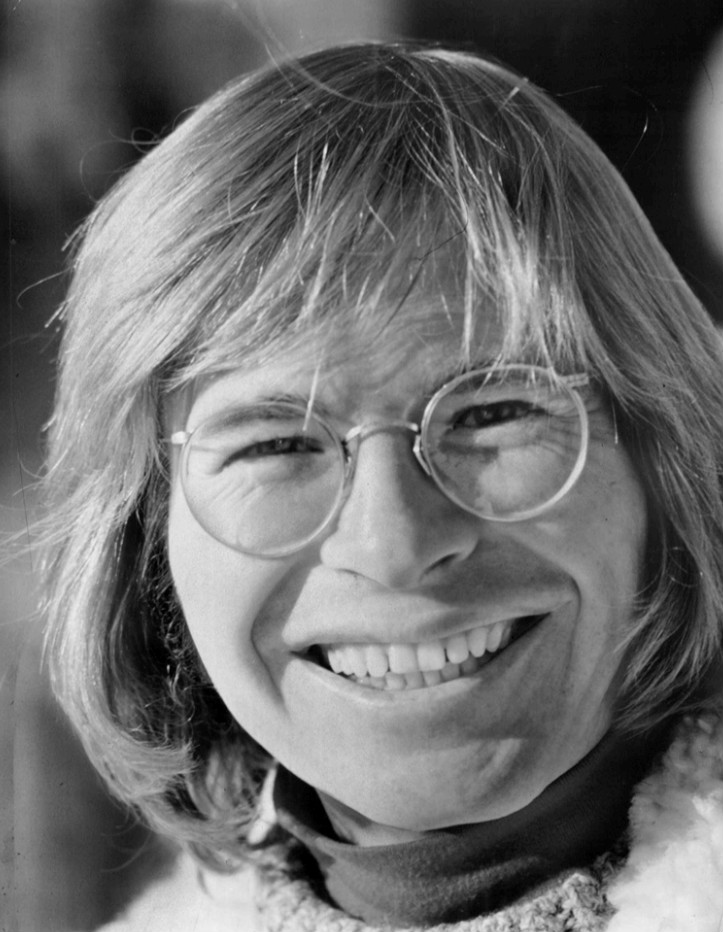
John Denver

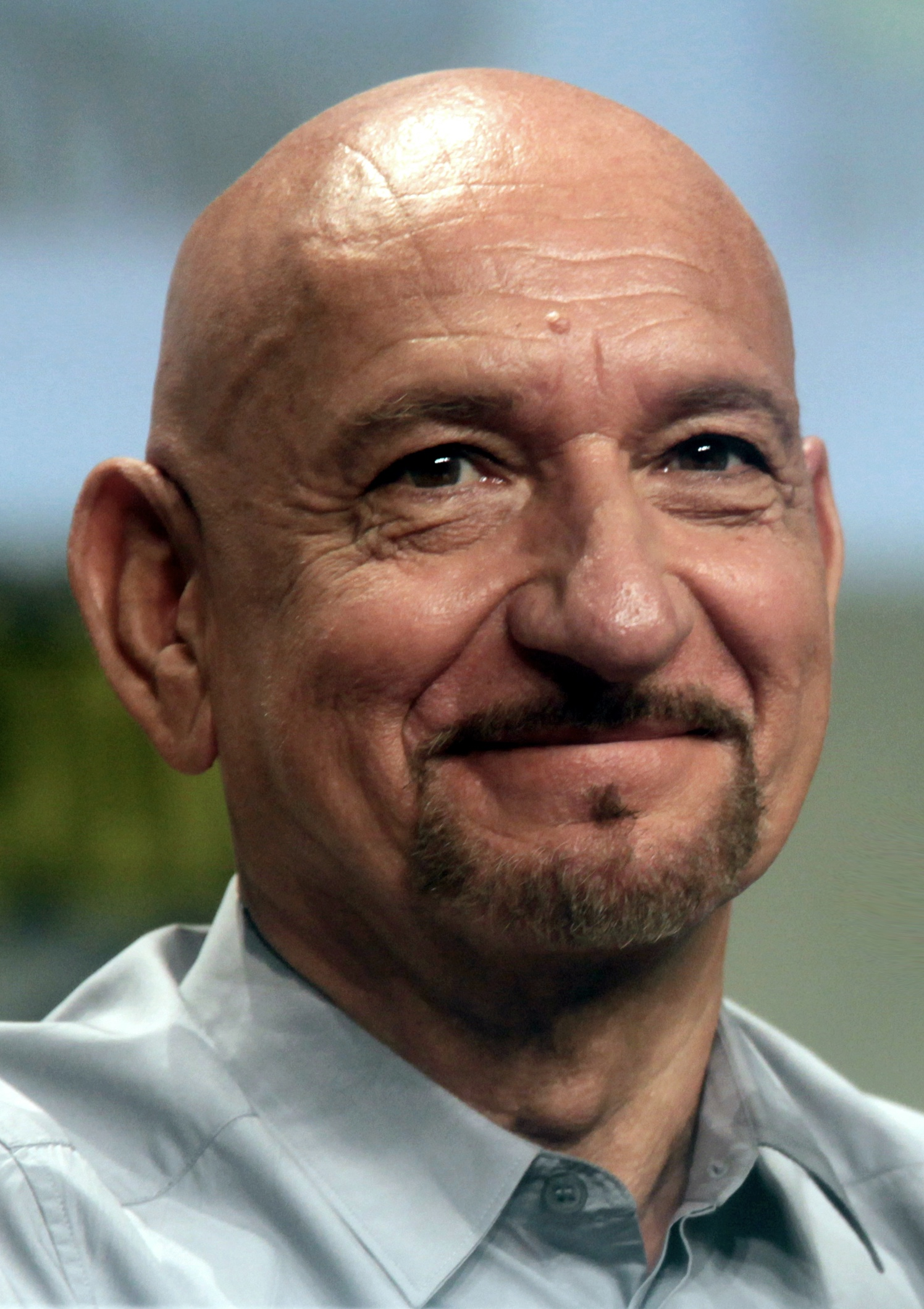
Ben Kingsley

- December 2
  - Wayne Allard, American politician
  - William Wegman, American photographer
- December 5
  - Eva Joly, Norwegian-born French magistrate
  - Nicolae Văcăroiu, 55th Prime Minister of Romania
- December 6 – Mike Smith (Dave Clark Five), English singer and songwriter (d. 2008)
- December 8
  - José Carbajal, Uruguayan singer, composer and guitarist (d. 2010)
  - Larry Martin, American paleontologist (d. 2013)
  - Jim Morrison, American rock musician (The Doors) (d. 1971)
  - Bodo Tümmler, German Olympic middle-distance runner
- December 11 – John Kerry, American politician, 68th U.S. Secretary of State
- December 12
  - Dickey Betts, American guitarist, singer, songwriter and composer (The Allman Brothers Band) (d. 2024)
  - Gianni Russo, American actor
  - Phyllis Somerville, American actress (d. 2020)
  - Grover Washington, Jr., African-American saxophonist (d. 1999)
- December 13
  - David W. Huff, American rock singer and guitarist (David and the Giants)
  - Ferguson Jenkins, Canadian baseball player
  - Mariví Ugolino, Uruguayan sculptor
- December 14
  - Britt Allcroft, British television producer, creator of Thomas & Friends (d. 2024)
  - António Simões, Portuguese footballer
- December 15 – Lucien den Arend, Dutch sculptor
- December 16 – Steven Bochco, American television producer (d. 2018)
- December 17
  - Pak Doo-ik, North Korean footballer
  - Ron Geesin, British musician, songwriter (Pink Floyd)
  - Rick Nolan, American politician
- December 18 – Keith Richards, English rock guitarist, songwriter (The Rolling Stones)
- December 19
  - Sam Kelly, English actor (d. 2014)
  - Ross M. Lence, American political scientist (d. 2006)
  - Jimmy Mackay, Australian football player (d. 1998)
- December 20 – Jacqueline Pearce, English screen actress (d. 2018)
- December 21 – Jack Nance, American actor (d. 1996)
- December 22 – Paul Wolfowitz, American political scientist
- December 23
  - Elizabeth Hartman, American actress (d. 1987)
  - Harry Shearer, American actor, comedian and screenwriter
  - Queen Silvia of Sweden, Queen consort of Sweden
- December 24
  - Tarja Halonen, 11th President of Finland
  - James A. Johnson, American business leader, philanthropist
- December 25 – Hanna Schygulla, German actress
- December 27 – Sam Hinds, 3-Time Prime Minister of Guyana
- December 28
  - Keith Floyd, British chef (d. 2009)
  - Chas Hodges, English musician and singer (d. 2018)
  - Craig MacIntosh, American illustrator
  - Billy Chapin, American child actor (d.2016)
  - Richard Whiteley, English television presenter (d. 2005)
- December 31
  - John Denver, American musician (d. 1997)
  - Sir Ben Kingsley, British actor (Gandhi)
  - Pete Quaife, English musician, artist and author (The Kinks) (d. 2010)

== Deaths ==
=== January ===
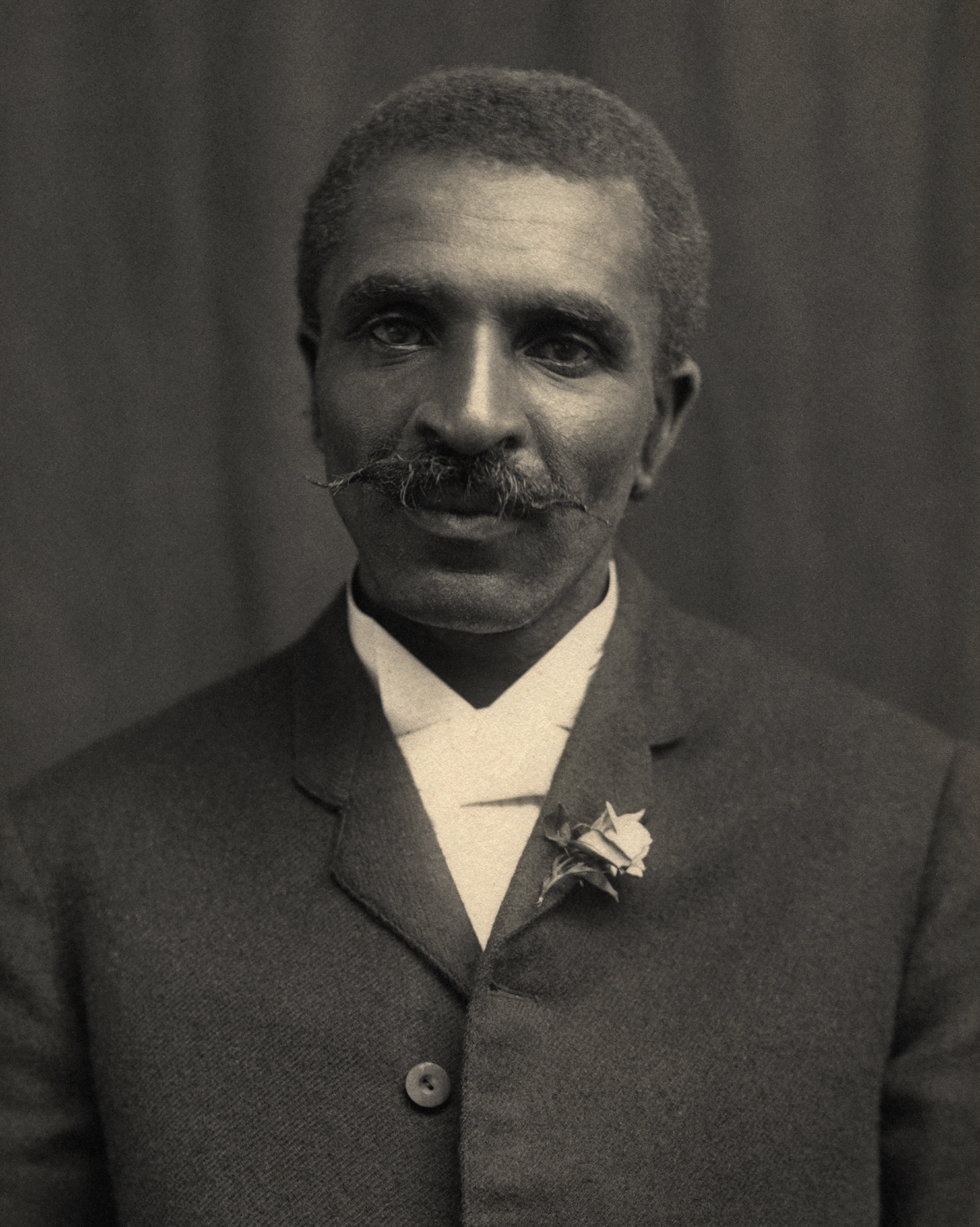
George Washington Carver

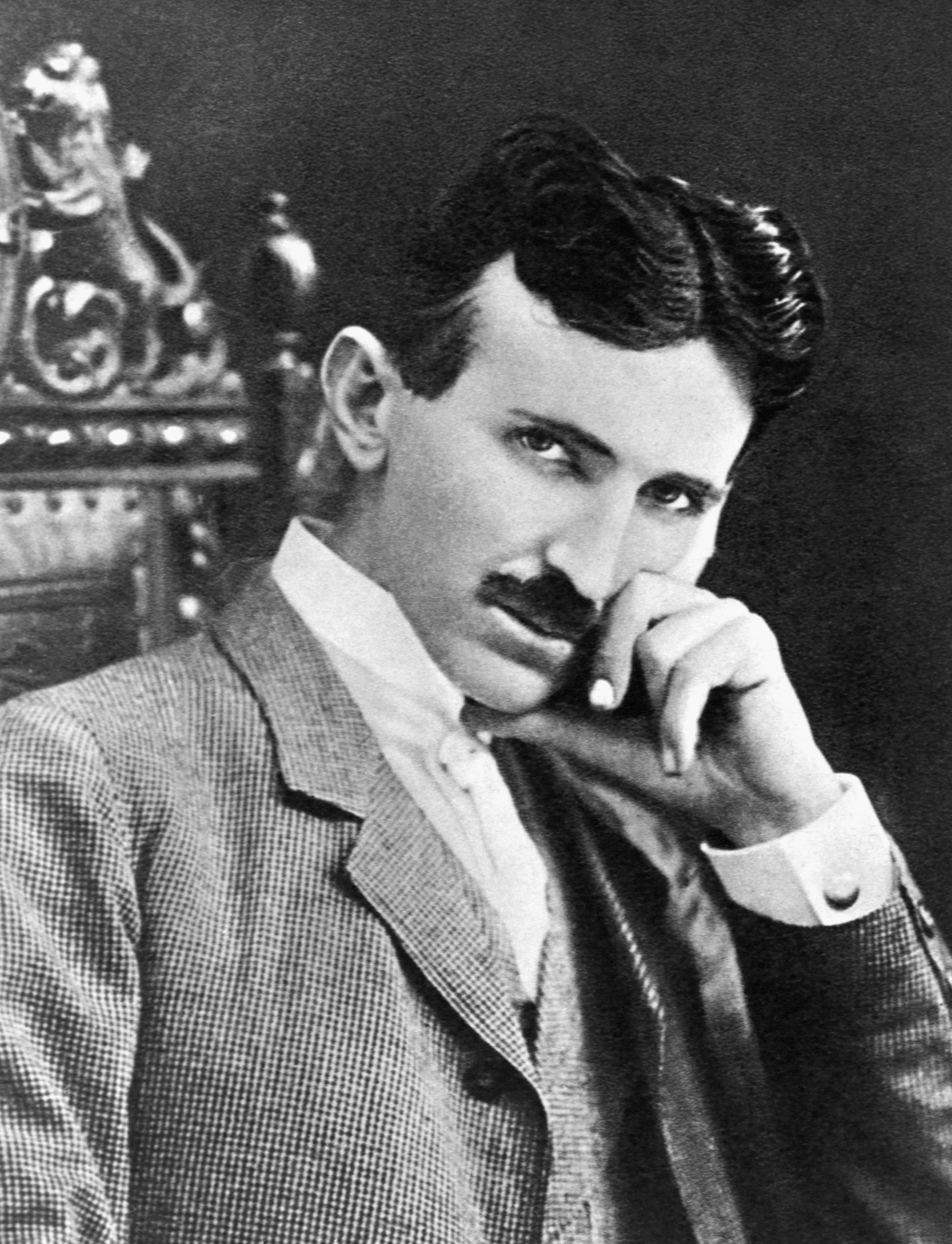
Nikola Tesla

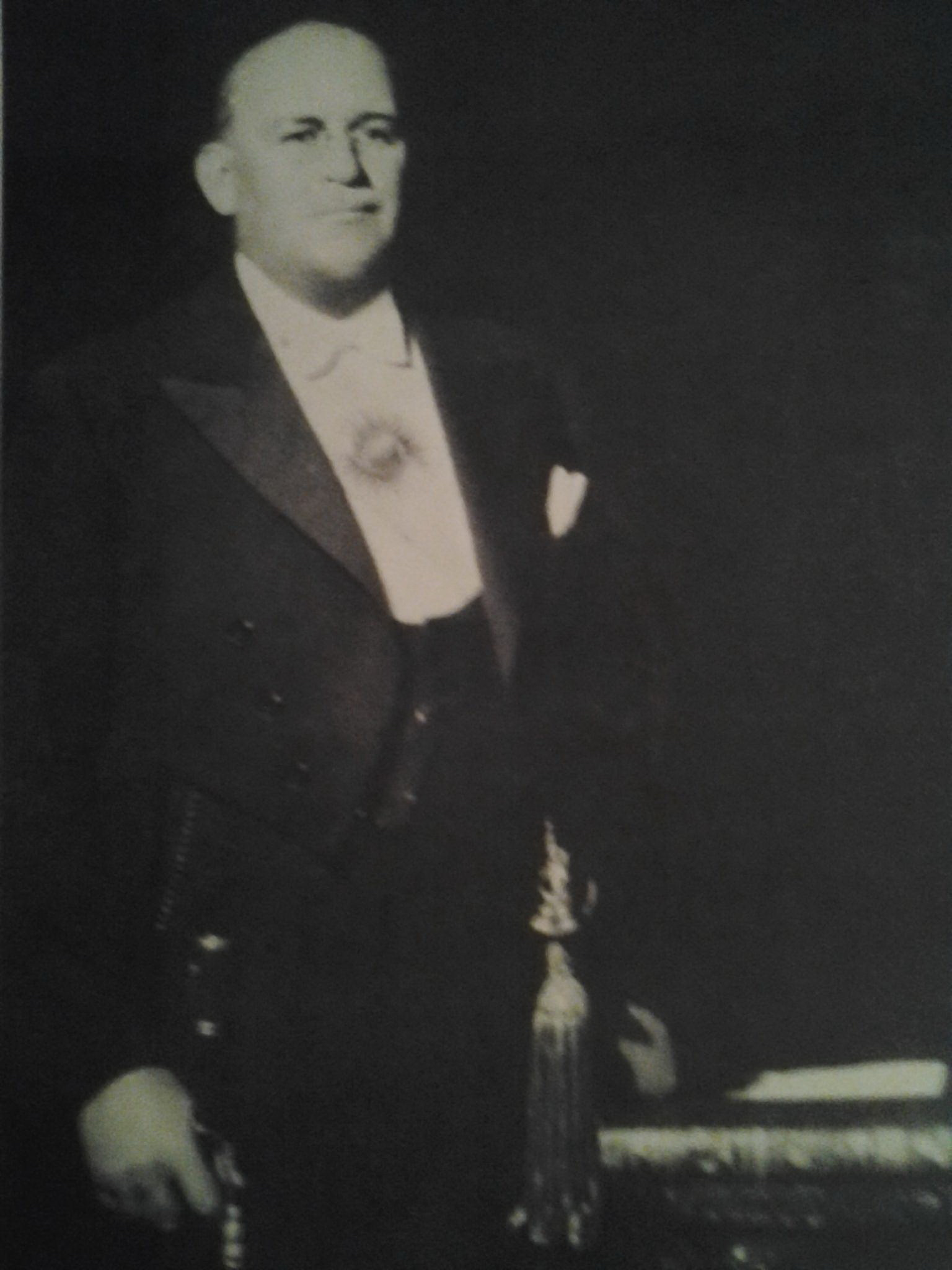
Agustin Pedro Justo

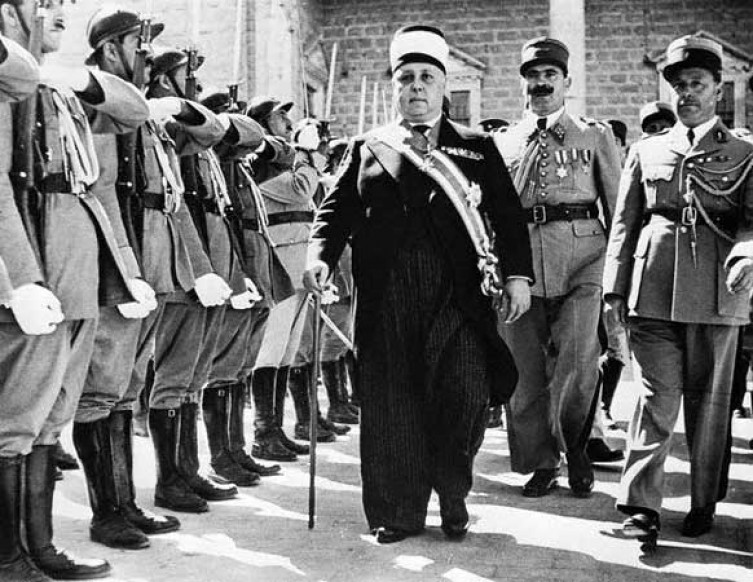
Taj al-Din al-Hasani

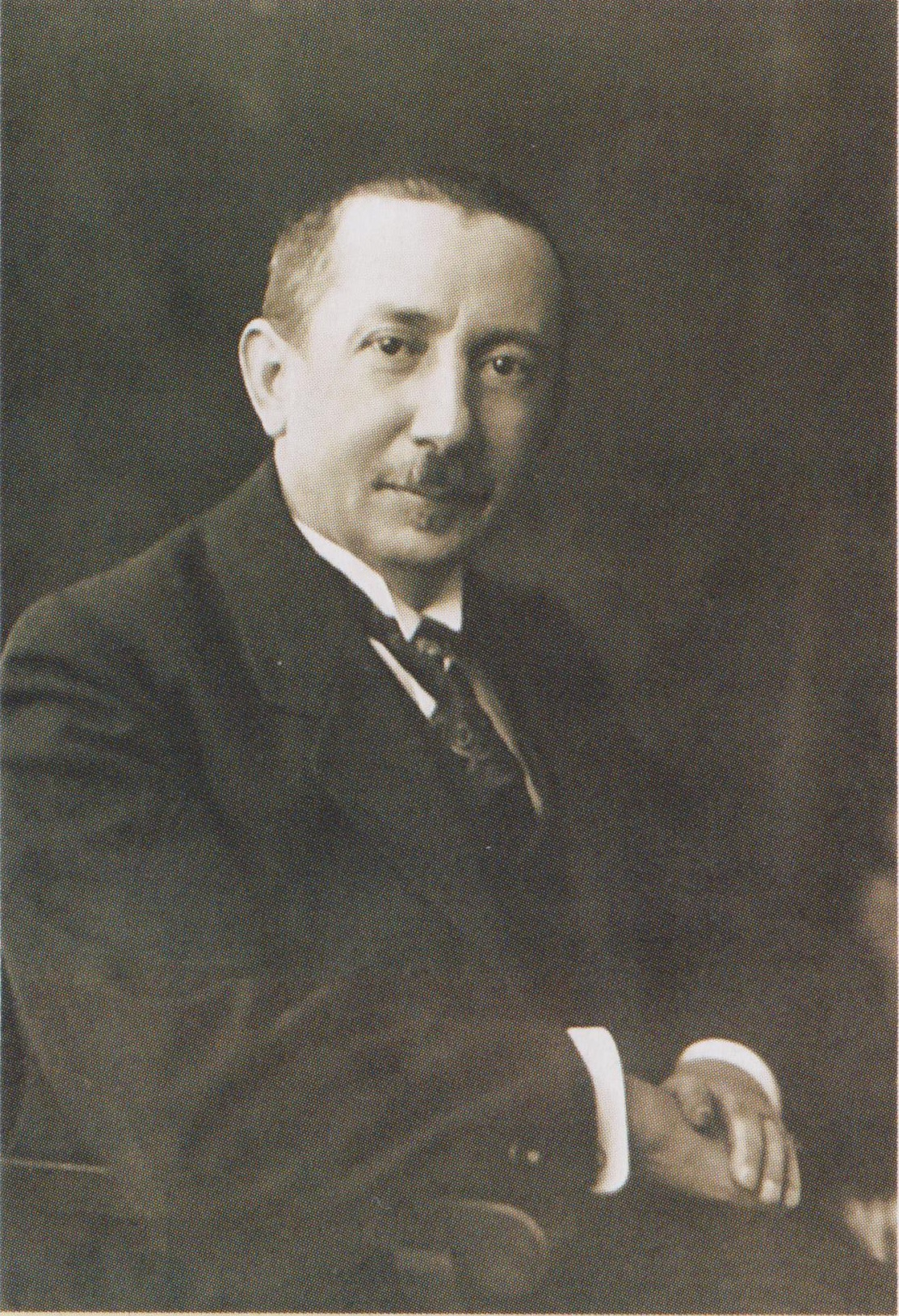
Gyula Peidl

- January 1 – Madeline Barclay, French SOE espionage agent (b. 1911)
- January 2
  - Qazim Koculi, Albanian politician, acting Prime Minister of Albania (murdered) (b. 1887)
  - Wilhelm Lorenz, German general (died of wounds) (b. 1894)
- January 3
  - Yusif Vazir Chamanzaminli, Azerbaijani statesman and writer (b. 1887)
  - Bid McPhee, American baseball player, MLB Hall of Famer (b. 1859)
- January 4
  - Hàm Nghi, Emperor of Vietnam (b. 1872)
  - Jerzy Iwanow-Szajnowicz, Greek-born Polish athlete, resistance member (executed) (b. 1911)
  - Kate Price, Irish-born American actress (b. 1872)
- January 5 – George Washington Carver, African-American botanist (b. c. 1864)
- January 7
  - George Washington Crile, founder of the Cleveland Clinic (b. 1864)
  - Nikola Tesla, Serbian-American electrical engineer, inventor (b. 1856)
- January 8 – Richard Hillary, Australian-born British Battle of Britain Spitfire pilot, author (killed on active service in aviation accident) (b. 1919)
- January 9 – R. G. Collingwood, English philosopher, historian and archaeologist (b. 1889)
- January 10 – Lewis Hall, American soldier (killed on active service) (b. 1895)
- January 11 – Agustín Pedro Justo, Argentinian military officer, diplomat and politician, 23rd President of Argentina (b. 1876)
- January 12 – Jan Campert, Dutch journalist, writer (in Neuengamme concentration camp) (b. 1902)
- January 13
  - Henner Henkel, German tennis champion (killed in action) (b. 1915)
  - Xavier Martinez, Mexican-born American painter (b. 1869)
  - Else Ury, German writer, children's book author (b. 1877)
- January 14 – Laura E. Richards, American author (b. 1850)
- January 15 – Eric Knight, American author (b. 1897)
- January 16 – Sir William Arbuthnot Lane, 1st Baronet, British surgeon (b. 1856)
- January 17
  - Jane Avril, French dancer (b. 1868)
  - Taj al-Din al-Hasani, Syrian politician, 6th Prime Minister of Syria and 6th President of Syria (b. 1885)
- January 18 – Urban Jacob Rasmus Børresen, Norwegian admiral and industry leader (b. 1857)
- January 19 – William Pettigrew, British Christian missionary (b. 1869)
- January 20
  - Giacomo Benvenuti, Italian composer (b. 1885)
  - Max Wladimir von Beck, former Minister-President of Austria (born 1854)
- January 21
  - Aimo Cajander, 7th Prime Minister of Finland (b. 1879)
  - Konstantinos Davakis, Greek army officer (died of wounds) (b. 1897)
- January 22 – Gyula Peidl, 23rd Prime Minister of Hungary (b. 1873)
- January 23 – Alexander Woollcott, American critic (b. 1887)
- January 26
  - Harry H. Laughlin, American eugenicist (b. 1880)
  - Nikolai Vavilov, Russian, Soviet botanist, geneticist (b. 1887)
- January 29
  - Henriette Caillaux, French murderer, socialite and wife of former French prime minister (b. 1874)
  - Vladimir Kokovtsov, 4th Chairman of the Council of Ministers of the Russian Empire (b. 1853)

=== February ===
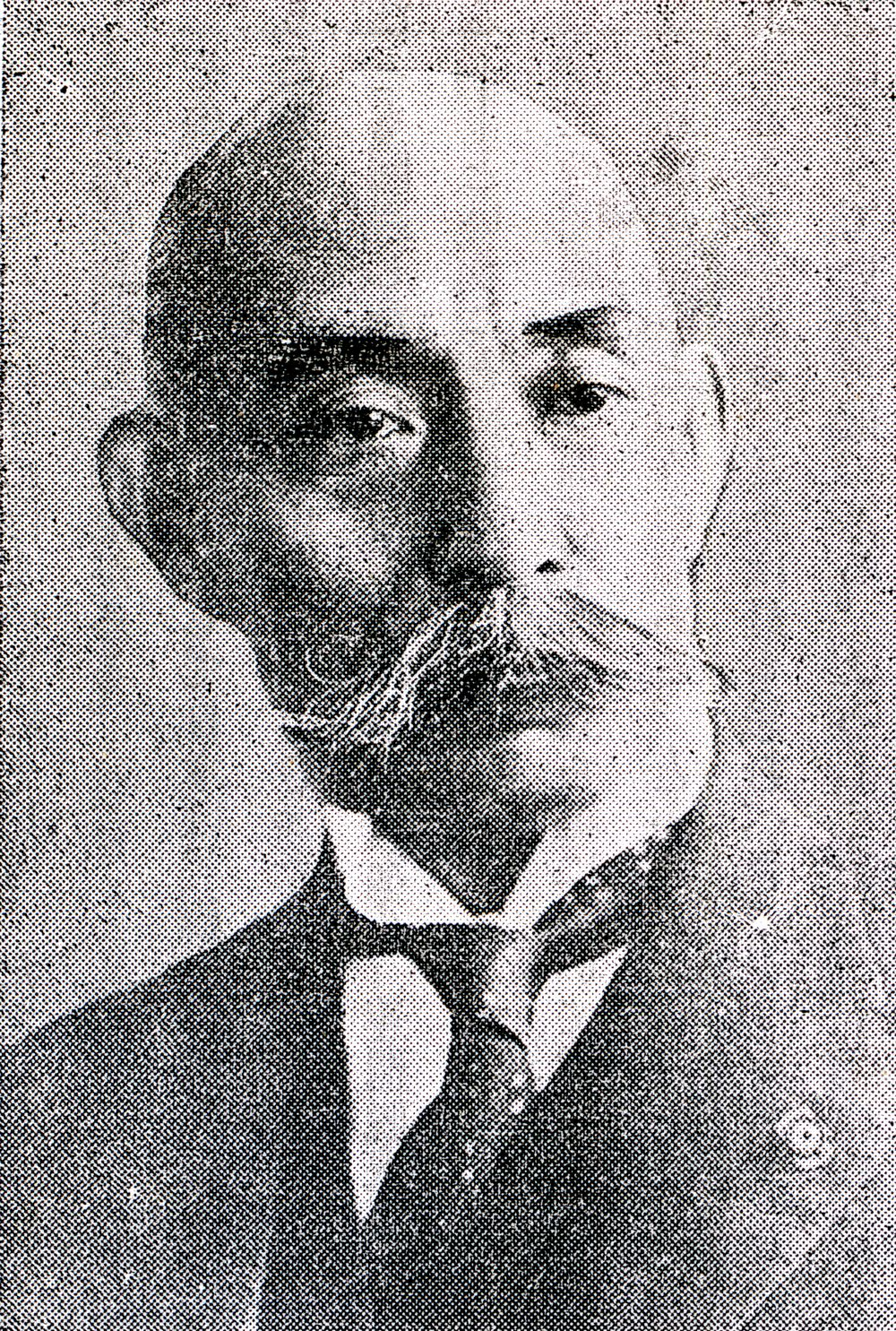
Senjūrō Hayashi

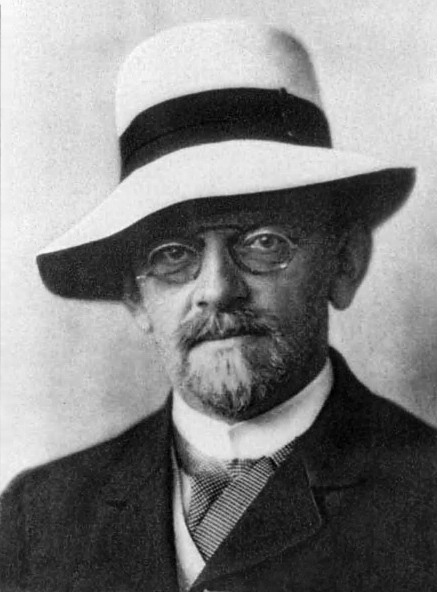
David Hilbert

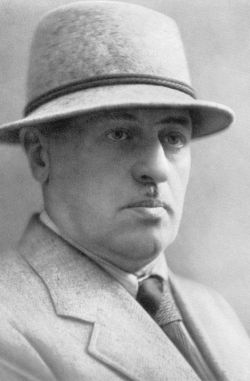
Karl Leopold von Möller

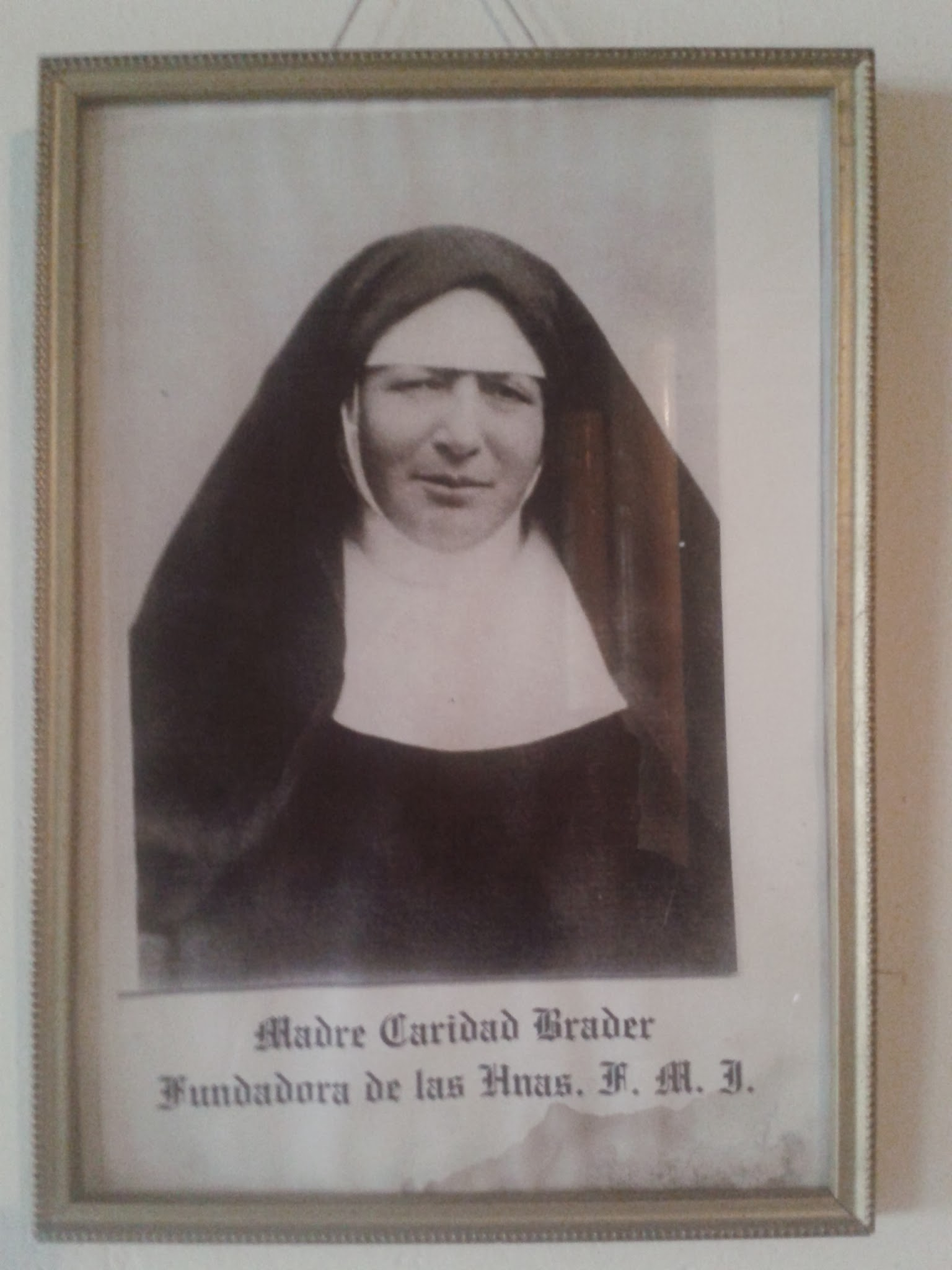
Blessed Maria Josefa Karolina Brader

- February 1 – Foy Draper, American Olympic athlete (killed in action) (b. 1911)
- February 2
  - Alfred Cavendish, British general (b. 1859)
  - Ganga Singh, Maharaja of Bikaner (b. 1880)
- February 4
  - Frank Calder, British-born Canadian ice hockey executive, first National Hockey League president (b. 1877)
  - Senjūrō Hayashi, Japanese army commander, politician and 22nd Prime Minister of Japan (b. 1876)
- February 5 – W. S. Van Dyke, American director (b. 1889)
- February 9
  - Eustace Fiennes, British soldier, politician (b. 1864)
  - Dmitry Kardovsky, Soviet painter, illustrator (b. 1866)
- February 10
  - Sverre Granlund, Norwegian general (b. 1918)
  - James T. Powers, American actor (b. 1862)
- February 11 – Bess Houdini, American wife of Harry Houdini (b. 1876)
- February 14
  - David Hilbert, German mathematician (b. 1862)
  - Aleksander Meysztowicz, Polish politician and landowner (bron 1864)
- February 15 – Charles Bennett, American actor (b. 1889)
- February 16 – Paul Ranous Greever, American politician (b. 1891)
- February 18 – Sir Reginald Pinney, British army general (b. 1863)
- February 19 – Jan Piekałkiewicz, Polish economist, statistician and politician (b. 1892)
- February 20
  - Ernest Guglielminetti, Swiss physician (b. 1862)
  - Donald Haines, American actor (b. 1919)
- February 22
  - Tamara Drasin, Russian-born American singer, actress (b. 1905)
  - Christoph Probst, German White Rose resistance member (executed) (b. 1919)
  - Hans Scholl, German White Rose resistance member (executed) (b. 1918)
  - Sophie Scholl, German White Rose resistance member (executed) (b. 1921)
- February 23
  - Sir Edward Heaton-Ellis, British vice-admiral (b. 1868)
  - Grigory Kravchenko, Soviet test pilot and air force general (killed in action) (b. 1912)
  - Karl Leopold von Möller, German officer, journalist, author and politician (b. 1876)
- February 26
  - Potato Creek Johnny, American gold prospector and pioneer (b. c. 1866)
  - Theodor Eicke, German Nazi official (killed in action) (b. 1892)
- February 27 – Maria Josefa Karolina Brader, Swiss Roman Catholic religious professed and blessed (b. 1860)

=== March ===
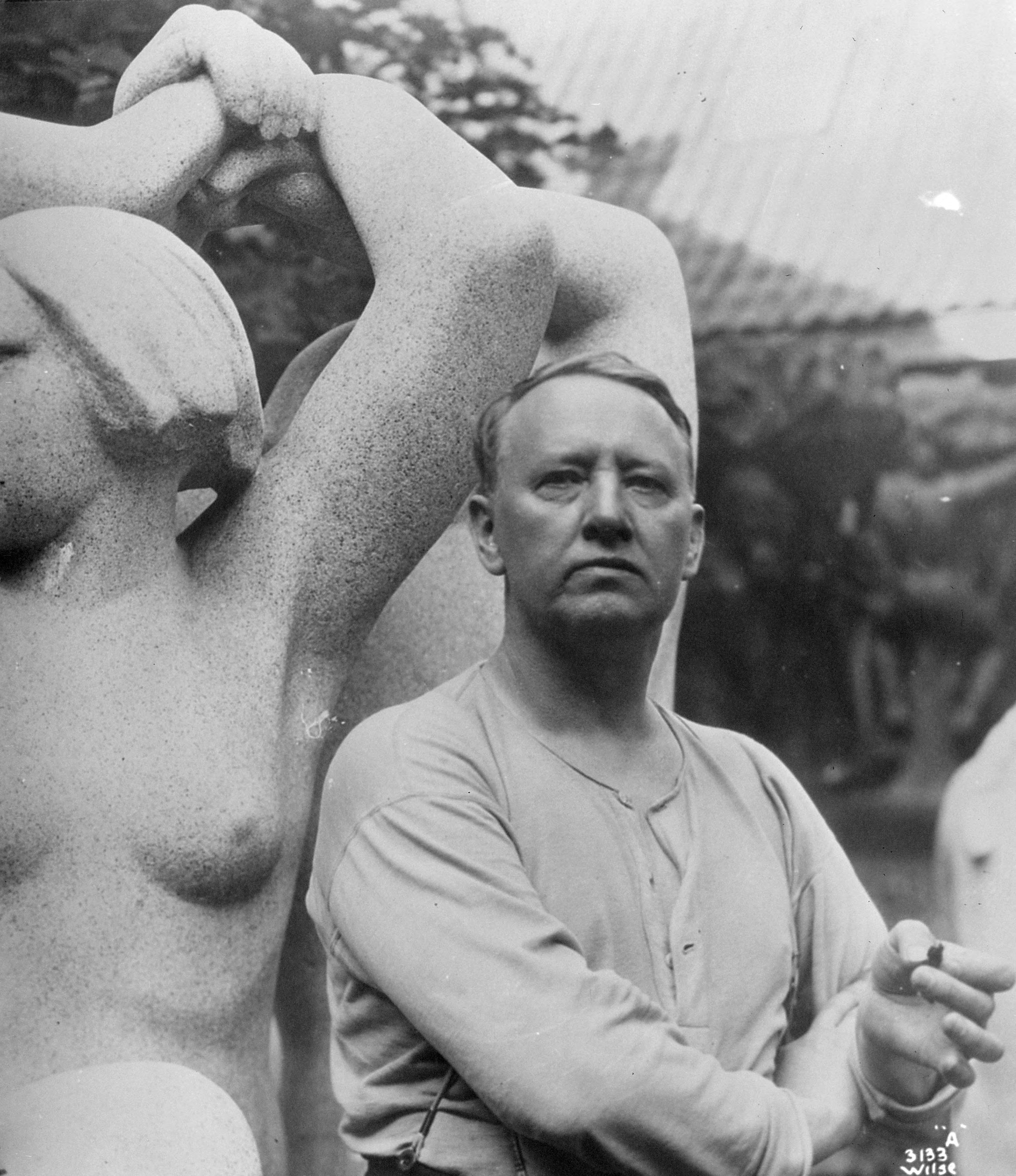
Gustav Vigeland

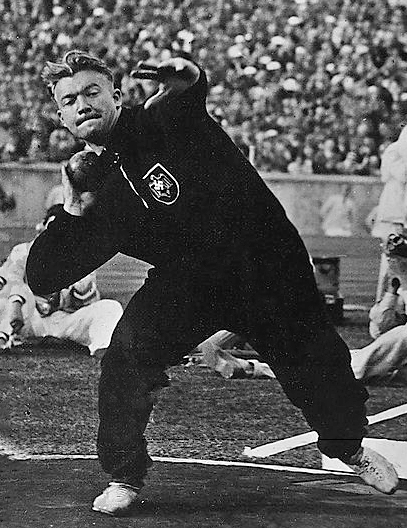
Hans Woellke

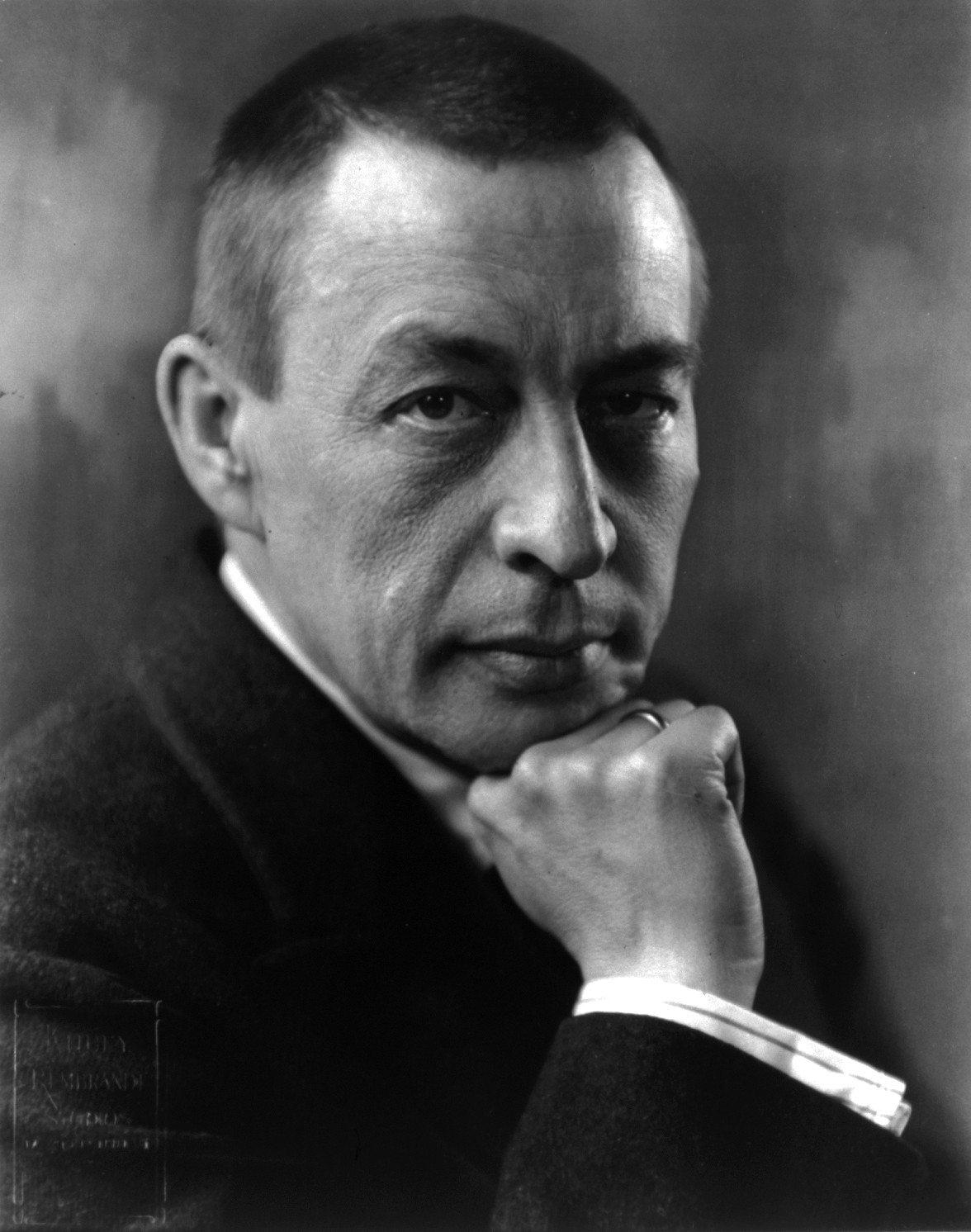
Sergei Rachmaninoff

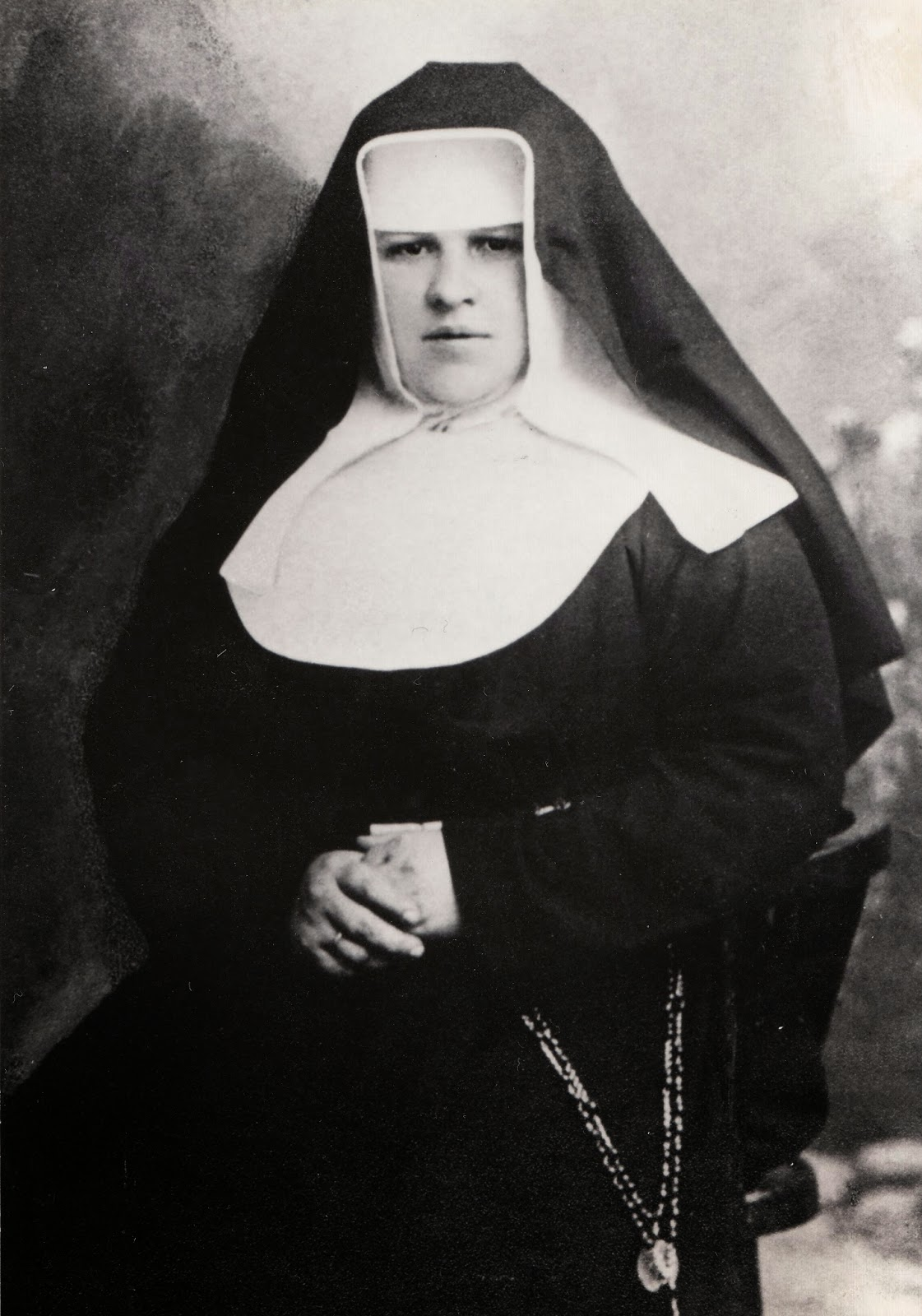
Blessed Maria Restituta Kafka

- March 1 – Alexandre Yersin, Swiss-French physician and bacteriologist (b. 1863)
- March 2 – Gisela Januszewska, Austrian physician (in Theresienstadt concentration camp) (b. 1867)
- March 3 – Rafael López Nussa, Puerto Rican physician (b. 1885)
- March 6 – Jimmy Collins, American baseball player, MLB Hall of Famer (b. 1870)
- March 8
  - Alma del Banco, German painter (suicide) (b. 1862)
  - Tjipto Mangoenkoesoemo, Indonesian independence leader (b. 1886)
- March 9 – Otto Freundlich, German painter, sculptor (killed in Majdanek concentration camp) (b. 1878)
- March 10
  - Laurence Binyon, English poet and scholar (b. 1869)
  - Tully Marshall, American character actor (b. 1864)
- March 12
  - Czesława Kwoka, Polish Roman Catholic religious sister and blessed (killed in Auschwitz concentration camp) (b. 1928)
  - Gustav Vigeland, Norwegian sculptor (b. 1869)
- March 13
  - Stephen Vincent Benét, American writer (b. 1898)
  - Jaap Nunes Vaz, Dutch journalist, writer and editor (killed in Sobibór extermination camp) (b. 1906)
- March 19 – Frank Nitti, Italian-born American gangster (suicide) (b. 1886)
- March 20
  - Lizika Jančar, Slovene Partisan, national hero (killed by militia) (b. 1919)
  - Heinrich Zimmer, German-born Indologist, historian (pneumonia) (b. 1890)
- March 22 – Hans Woellke, German Olympic athlete (killed by partisans) (b. 1911)
- March 23 – Mervyn Herbert, Viscount Clive, British peer, army officer (killed on active service in aviation accident) (b. 1904)
- March 27 – George Monckton-Arundell, 8th Viscount Galway, British politician, 5th Governor-General of New Zealand (b. 1882)
- March 28
  - Ben Davies, British tenor (b. 1858)
  - Lorenzo Gasparri, Italian admiral (killed on active service in accidental explosion) (b. 1894)
  - Edward Heron-Allen, British polymath, lawyer, scientist and scholar (b. 1861)
  - Robert W. Paul, British film director (b. 1869)
  - Sergei Rachmaninoff, Russian composer (b. 1873)
- March 30 – Maria Restituta Kafka, German Roman Catholic religious sister and blessed (executed) (b. 1894)
- March 31 – Pavel Milyukov, exiled Russian politician, founder and leader of the Constitutional Democratic Party (b. 1859)

=== April ===
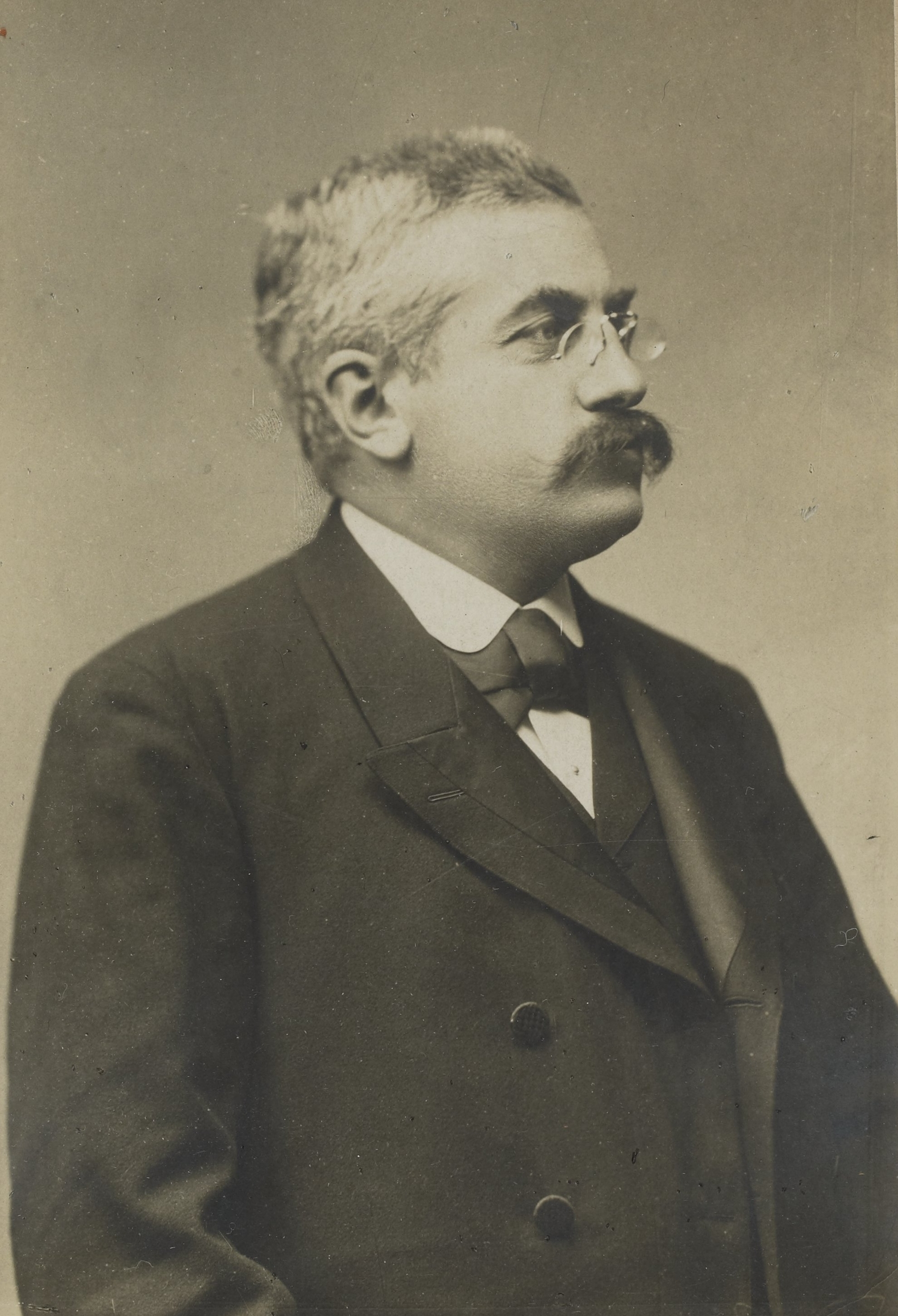
Alexandre Millerand

- April 1 – Vahida Maglajlić, Yugoslav partisan, national hero (killed in combat) (b. 1907)
- April 3 – Conrad Veidt, German actor (b. 1893)
- April 5 – W. G. Howard Gritten, British barrister, writer and conservative politician (b. 1870)
- April 6 – Alexandre Millerand, French politician, 41st Prime Minister of France and 11th President of France (b. 1859)
- April 7 – Auguste Audollent, French historian, archaeologist (b. 1864)
- April 8
  - Harry Baur, French actor (b. 1880)
  - Itamar Ben-Avi, Israeli activist (b. 1882)
  - Tomás Garrido Canabal, Mexican politician, revolutionary (b. 1891)
  - Otto and Elise Hampel, German anti-Nazi resistance members (executed) (b. 1897 & 1903)
  - Richard Sears, American tennis champion (b. 1861)
- April 9 – Philip Slier, Dutch Jewish typesetter (in Sobibór extermination camp) (b. 1923)
- April 11 – Kim Myeong-sik, Korean independence activist (b. 1890)
- April 13 – Oskar Schlemmer, German painter, sculptor, designer and choreographer (b. 1888)
- April 16 – Carlos Arniches, Spanish playwright (b. 1866)
- April 18 – Isoroku Yamamoto, Japanese admiral (b. 1884)
- April 21 – Rihard Jakopič, Yugoslav painter (b. 1869)
- April 24
  - Kenneth Whiting, United States Navy officer, submarine and naval aviation pioneer (b. 1881)
  - Kurt von Hammerstein-Equord, German general (b. 1878)
- April 30
  - Otto Jespersen, Danish linguist, creator of Ido and Novial languages (b.1860)
  - Beatrice Webb, British sociologist, economist, historian and social reformer (b. 1858)

=== May ===
Blessed Grzegorz Bolesław Frąckowiak

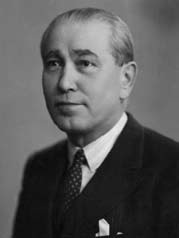
Fethi Okyar

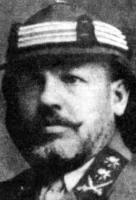
Rida Pasha al-Rikabi

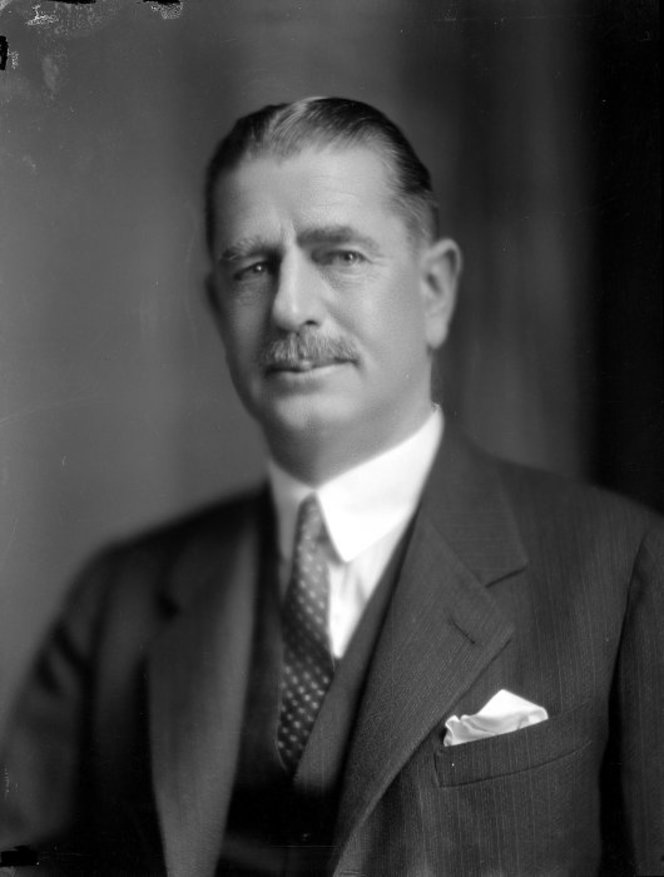
Gordon Coates

- May 1 – Johan Oscar Smith, Norwegian Christian leader, founder of Brunstad Christian Church (b. 1871)
- May 3 – Frank Maxwell Andrews, American general (plane crash) (b. 1884)
- May 4
  - Cesira Ferrani, Italian soprano (b. 1863)
  - Saverio Marotta, Italian naval officer (killed in action) (b. 1911)
- May 5
  - Grzegorz Bolesław Frąckowiak, Polish Roman Catholic priest, martyr and blessed (executed) (b. 1911)
  - Gordon Hewart, 1st Viscount Hewart, British politician, judge (b. 1870)
- May 7 – Fethi Okyar, Turkish diplomat, politician and 2nd Prime Minister of Turkey (b. 1880)
- May 8 – Miroslav Šalom Freiberger, Yugoslav rabbi, writer and spiritual leader (killed at Auschwitz concentration camp) (b. 1903)
- May 14
  - George, Crown Prince of Saxony, Catholic priest (b. 1893)
  - Henri La Fontaine, Belgian lawyer, author and Nobel Prize laureate (b. 1854)
- May 15 – Horst Hannig, German Luftwaffe fighter ace (b. 1921)
- May 17
  - Johanna Elberskirchen, German feminist (b. 1864)
  - Montagu Love, British actor (b. 1877)
- May 19 – Kristjan Raud, Soviet painter, drawer (b. 1865)
- May 20 – John Stone Stone, American physicist, inventor (b. 1869)
- May 22 – Helen Taft, First Lady of the United States (b. 1861)
- May 24 – Johannes Orasmaa, Estonian army general (in labour camp) (b. 1890)
- May 25 – Ali Rikabi, 1st Prime Minister of Syria, 2-time Prime Minister of Jordan (b. 1864)
- May 26 – Edsel Ford, American businessman, president of Ford Motor Company (b. 1893)
- May 27 – Gordon Coates, 21st Prime Minister of New Zealand (b. 1878)
- May 31
  - Prince Georg of Bavaria, Catholic priest (b. 1880)
  - Helmut Kapp, German Gestapo official (killed by partisans)

=== June ===
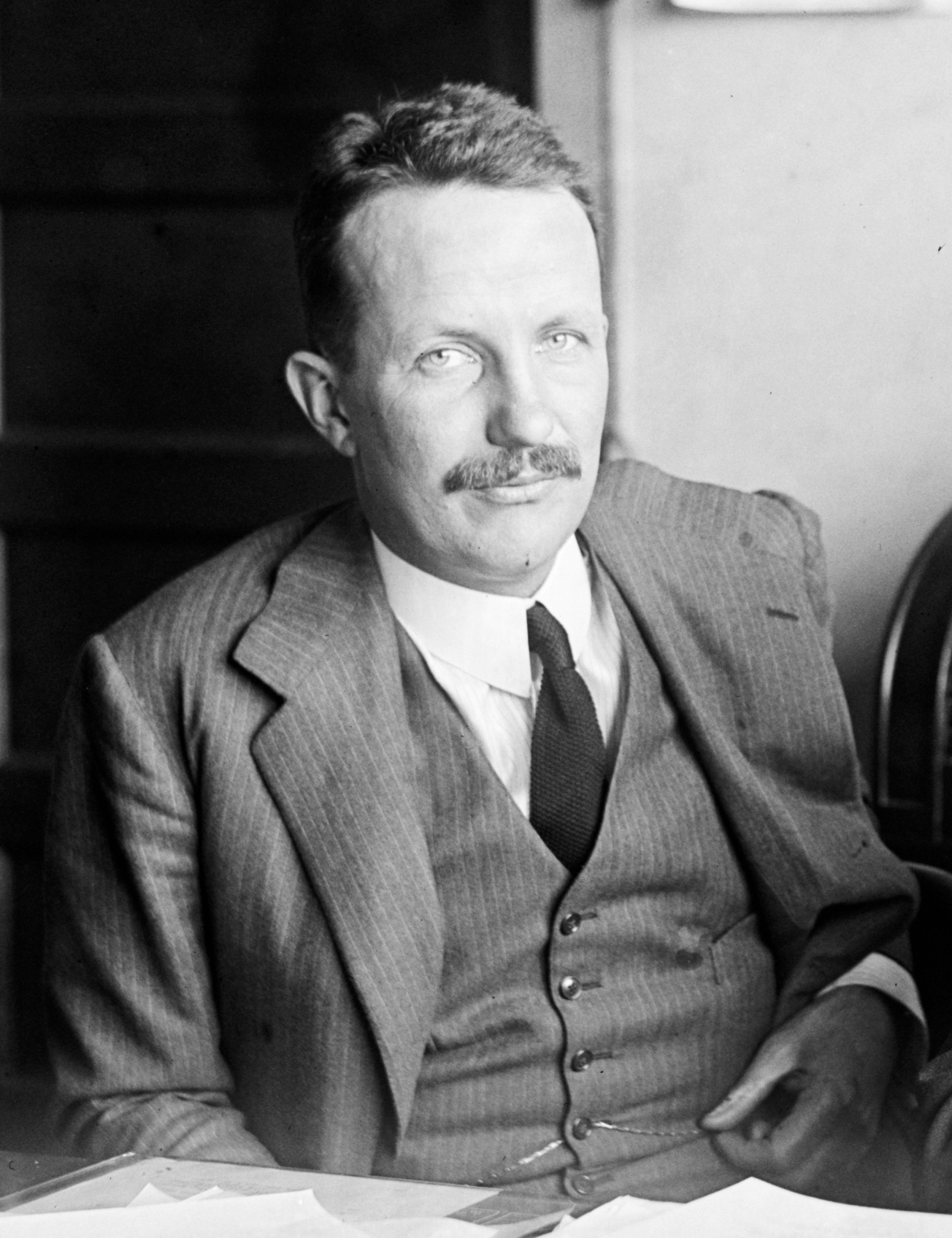
Kermit Roosevelt

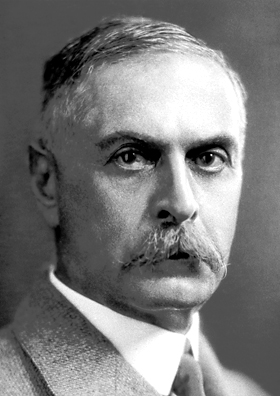
Karl Landsteiner

- June 1
  - István Bárczy, Hungarian politician (b. 1866)
  - Leslie Howard, British actor (aircraft shot down) (b. 1893)
- June 2 – Nile Kinnick, American athlete, Heisman Trophy winner (died on active service in aviation accident) (b. 1918)
- June 3 – Osgood Hanbury, British pilot (killed on active service) (b. 1917)
- June 4
  - Francesco Pianzola, Italian Roman Catholic priest and blessed (b. 1881)
  - Kermit Roosevelt, American explorer, author (suicide) (b. 1889)
- June 10 – Sultan Abdelaziz of Morocco (b. 1878)
- June 12 – Hans Junkermann, German actor (b. 1872)
- June 26 – Karl Landsteiner, Austrian biologist, physician (b. 1868)
- June 28 – Pietro Porcelli, Italian sculptor (b. 1872)
- June 30 – Kristian Kristiansen, Norwegian explorer (b. 1865)

=== July ===
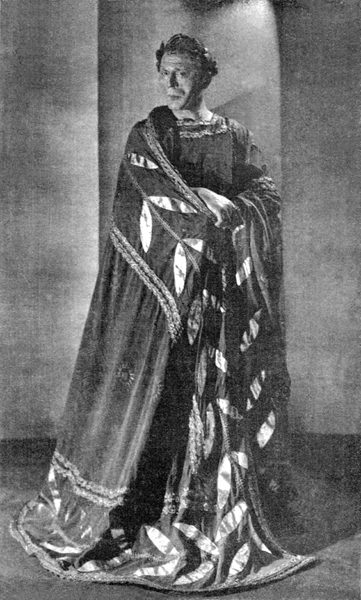
Kazimierz Junosza-Stępowski

Saint Ignacia Nazaria March Mesa

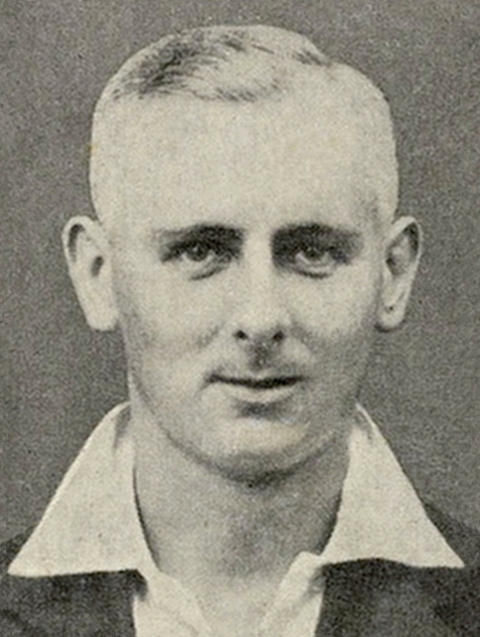
Hedley Verity

- July 2 – Alice Mary Dowd, American educator and poet (b. 1855)
- July 4
  - Cevat Abbas Gürer, Turkish army officer (b. 1887)
  - Gordon Sidney Harrington, Canadian politician (b. 1883)
  - Zofia Leśniowska, Polish army officer (aviation accident) (b. 1912)
  - Władysław Sikorski, Polish prime minister in exile (aviation accident) (b. 1881)
  - Charles Stevenson, American silent film actor (b. 1887)
- July 5
  - Leonardo Ferrulli, Italian pilot (killed in action) (b. 1918)
  - Kazimierz Junosza-Stępowski, Polish actor (b. 1880)
- July 6
  - Teruo Akiyama, Japanese admiral (killed in action) (b. 1891)
  - Nazaria Ignacia March Mesa, Spanish-born Roman Catholic religious sister, canonized (b. 1889)
- July 8
  - Jean Moulin, French resistance fighter (injuries from suicide attempt in custody) (b. 1899)
  - Sir Harry Oakes, American-born British gold mine owner (murdered) (b. 1874)
- July 11 – Eugen Lovinescu, Romanian critic, academic and novelist (b. 1881)
- July 12 – Cecilia Loftus, Scottish-born actress (b. 1876)
- July 13
  - Lorenzo Barcelata, Mexican composer (b. 1898)
  - Marianna Biernacka, Polish Roman Catholic religious sister, martyr and blessed (killed) (b. 1888)
  - Kurt Huber, German university professor, member of the White Rose resistance group in Nazi Germany (executed) (b. 1893)
  - Luz Long, German long jump athlete (killed in action) (b. 1913)
  - Alexander Schmorell, Russian-born German White Rose resistance member, Orthodox Church passion bearer and saint (executed) (b. 1917)
- July 14 – Mariya Borovichenko, Soviet medical officer (killed in action) (b. 1925)
- July 16 – Saul Raphael Landau, Polish Jewish lawyer, journalist, publicist and Zionist activist (b. 1870)
- July 19
  - Martin Faust, American film actor (b. 1886)
  - Giuseppe Terragni, Italian architect (b. 1904)
- July 20
  - Maria Gay, Spanish opera singer (b. 1879)
  - Charles Hazelius Sternberg, American fossil collector and paleontologist (b. 1850)
- July 21
  - José Jurado de la Parra, Spanish journalist, poet and playwright (b. 1856)
  - Charley Paddock, American sprinter (aviation accident) (b. 1900)
  - Louis Vauxcelles, French art critic (b. 1870)
  - Theodor von Guérard, German jurist, politician (b. 1863)
- July 23 – Mario Nicolis di Robilant, Italian general (b. 1855)
- July 26 – Luis Barros Borgoño, Chilean politician (b. 1858)
- July 28 – Charles Granval, French actor (b. 1882)
- July 29 – William Ewart Hart, Australian aviator, dentist (b. 1885)
- July 30 – Max Eitingon, Belarusian-German medical doctor and psychoanalyst (b. 1881)
- July 31
  - Zdzisław Lubomirski, Polish aristocrat, landowner, lawyer, politician and activist (b. 1865)
  - James MacLachlan, British flying ace (b. 1919)
  - Hedley Verity, British cricketer (b. 1905)
  - Rodger Young, American soldier, remembered in the song "The Ballad of Rodger Young" (killed in action) (b. 1918)

=== August ===
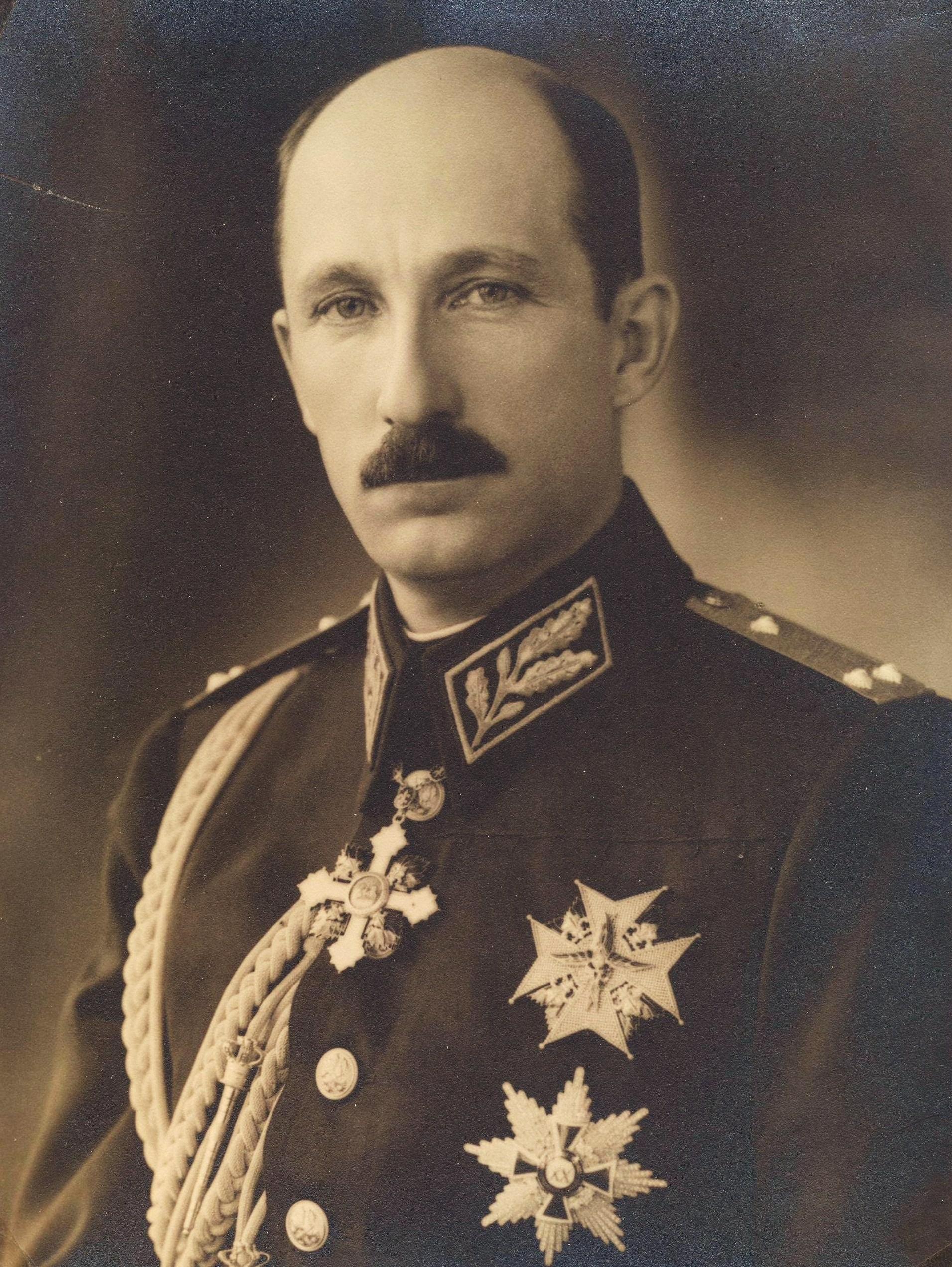
King Boris III of Bulgaria

- August 1
  - Martyrs of Nowogródek, Polish nuns, martyrs and blessed (executed) (b. 1888–1916)
  - Lin Sen, Chinese chairman of the National Government of China (b. 1868)
- August 5
  - Iosif Apanasenko, Soviet commander (killed in action) (b. 1890)
  - Eva-Maria Buch, German resistance leader (executed) (b. 1921)
- August 9
  - Franz Jägerstätter, Austrian conscientious objector, martyr and blessed (executed) (b. 1907)
  - Chaïm Soutine, Russian-born painter (b. 1893)
- August 18 – Hans Jeschonnek, German general (suicide) (b. 1899)
- August 21 – Henrik Pontoppidan, Danish writer, Nobel Prize laureate (b. 1857)
- August 22 – Virgilio Dávila, Puerto Rican poet, educator, businessman and politician (b. 1869)
- August 24
  - Ettore Muti, Italian Fascist politician (shot while under arrest) (b. 1902)
  - Hermannus Reydon, Dutch journalist and Nazi collaborator (shot by Dutch resistance) (b. 1896)
  - Simone Weil, French philosopher (b. 1909)
- August 26 – Ted Ray, British golfer (b. 1877)
- August 27 – Constantin Prezan, Romanian general, Marshal of Romania (b. 1861)
- August 28 – King Boris III of Bulgaria (b. 1894)
- August 29 – Baba Nand Singh ji, Punjabi Sikh religious leader, saint (b. 1870)

=== September ===
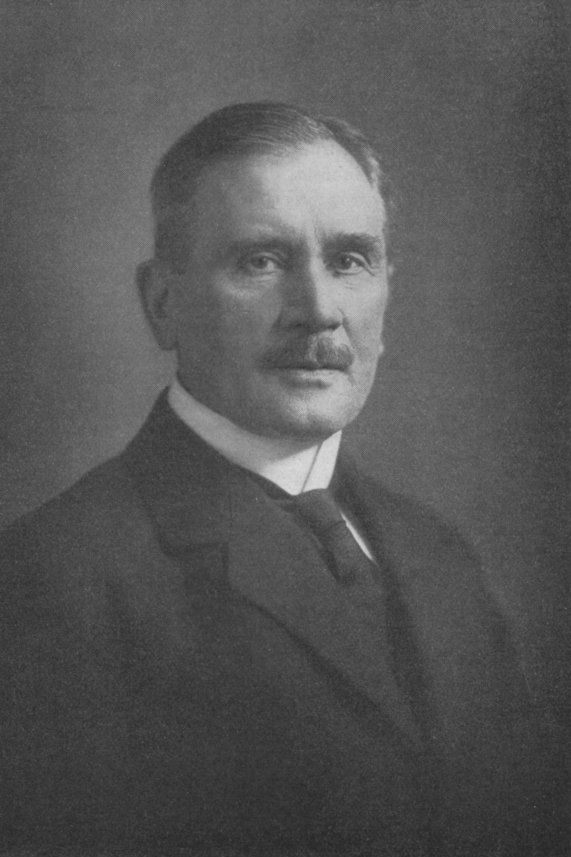
Ernst Trygger

- September 1 – Charles Atangana, Cameroonian chief (b. c.1880)
- September 2 – Marsden Hartley, American Modernist artist (b. 1877)
- September 6 – Reginald McKenna, British Chancellor of the Exchequer 1915–1916 (b. 1863)
- September 7
  - Géza Grünwald, Hungarian mathematician (b. 1910)
  - Karlrobert Kreiten, German pianist (executed) (b. 1916)
- September 8 – Julius Fučík, Czech resistance fighter (executed) (b. 1903)
- September 9
  - Carlo Bergamini, Italian admiral (killed in action) (b. 1888)
  - Federico Martinengo, Italian pilot (killed in action) (b. 1899)
- September 11 – Oswald Teichmüller, German mathematician (b. 1913)
- September 13
  - David Bacon, American film actor (b. 1914)
  - Ugo Cavallero, General of the Italian Army (assassinated or suicide) (b. 1880)
- September 17 – (killed in Ponary massacre)
  - Kazimierz Pelczar, Polish oncologist, academic (b. 1894)
  - Mieczysław Witold Gutkowski, Polish lawyer (b. 1893)
- September 19 – Germaine Cernay, French mezzo-soprano (b. 1900)
- September 23
  - Elinor Glyn, British writer, critic (b. 1864)
  - Ernst Trygger, Swedish professor, politician and 19th Prime Minister of Sweden (b. 1857)
- September 26 – Henri Fertet, French Resistance fighter (b. 1926)
- September 28
  - Sam Ruben, American chemist (b. 1913)
  - Filippo Illuminato, Italian partisan, Gold Medal of Military Valour (b. 1930)
- September 27 – Willoughby Hamilton, Irish tennis player (b. 1864)
- September 29 – Mariano Goybet, French army general (b. 1861)
- September 30
  - Johan Ludwig Mowinckel, Norwegian businessman, Prime Minister of Norway (b. 1870)
  - Adolf Paul, Swedish novelist, playwright (b. 1863)

=== October ===
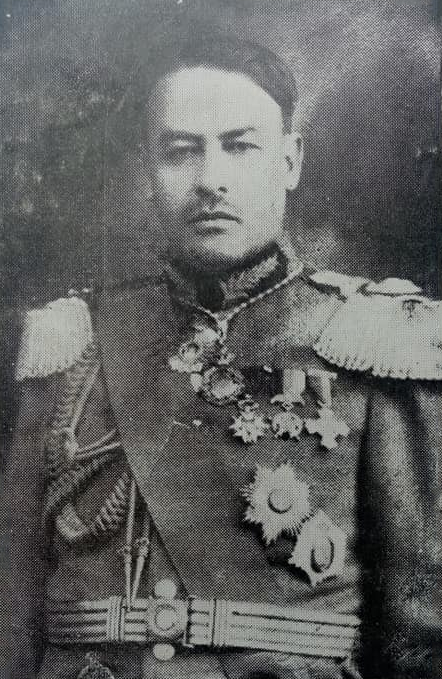
Carlos Blanco Galindo

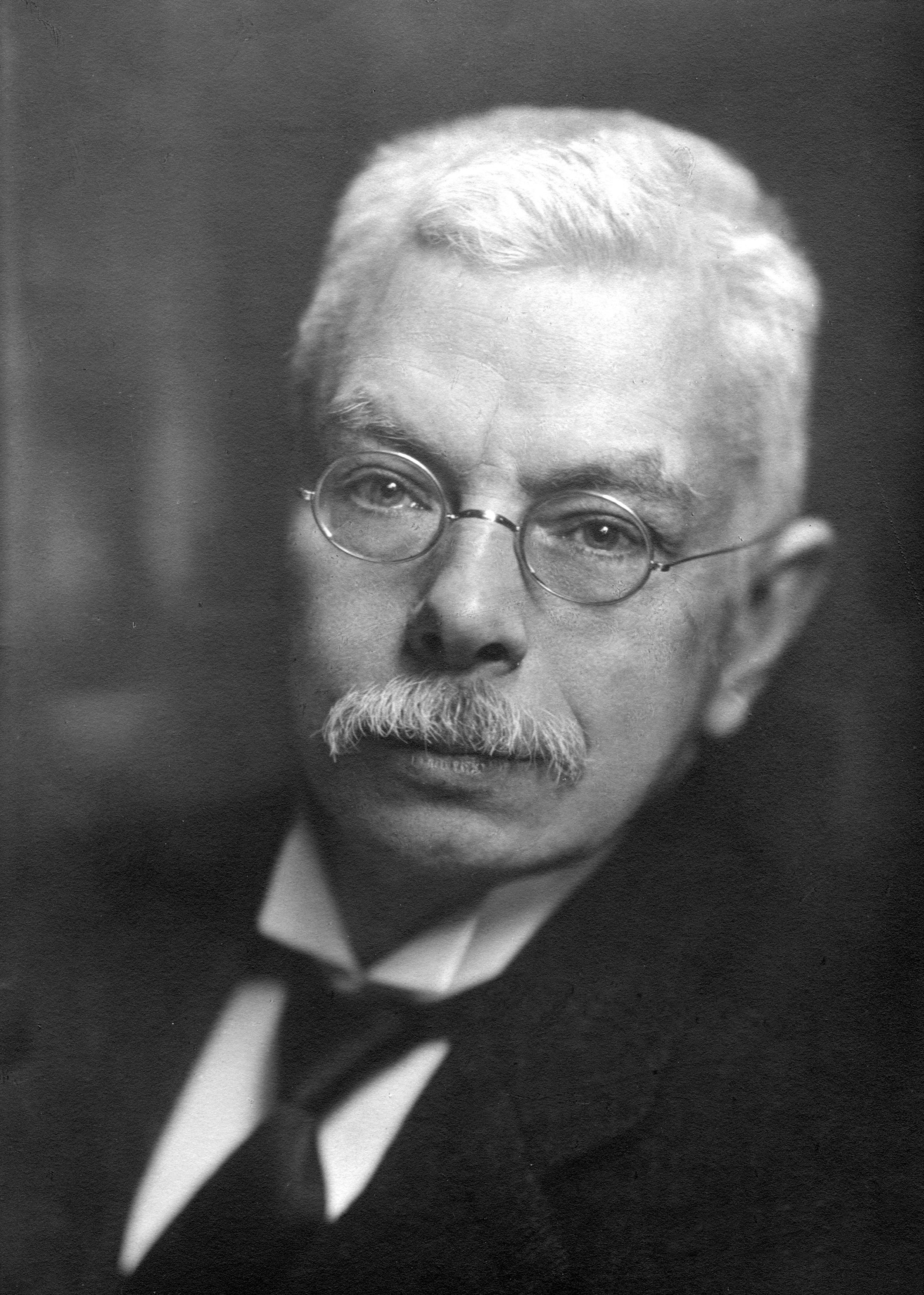
Pieter Zeeman

- October 2
  - Carlos Blanco Galindo, 32nd President of Bolivia (b. 1882)
  - Muhamed Hadžiefendić, Yugoslav army officer (killed by partisans) (b. 1898)
- October 4 – Irena Iłłakowicz, Polish general (murdered) (b. 1906)
- October 5 – Leon Roppolo, American jazz clarinetist (b. 1902)
- October 6 – Ignaz Trebitsch-Lincoln, Hungarian adventurer (b. 1879)
- October 7
  - Eugeniusz Bodo, Polish actor (b. 1899)
  - Prince Christoph of Hesse (aviation accident) (b. 1901)
- October 8
  - Marianne Golz, Austrian-born opera singer, World War II resistance member (executed) (b. 1895)
  - Wilhelm Hegeler, German novelist (b. 1870)
- October 9 – Pieter Zeeman, Dutch physicist, Nobel Prize laureate (b. 1865)
- October 12
  - Willi Graf, member of the White Rose resistance group in Nazi Germany (executed) (b. 1918)
  - Max Wertheimer, Austro-Hungarian psychologist (b. 1880)
- October 14
  - Rudolf Beckmann, German SS officer (Sobibór uprising) (b. 1910)
  - Siegfried Graetschus, German SS officer (Sobibór uprising) (b. 1916)
  - Johann Niemann, German SS officer (Sobibór uprising) (b. 1913)
- October 15 – William Penhallow Henderson, American painter, architect and furniture designer (b. 1877)
- October 18
  - Pere Areny, Andorran convicted murderer, last person to be executed by Andorra (b 1913)
  - Margaret Bartholomew, American Civil Air Patrol officer (aviation accident on mission) (b. 1903)
- October 19 – Camille Claudel, French sculptor (b. 1864)
- October 21 – Sir Dudley Pound, British admiral (b. 1877)
- October 22 – Sir Reginald Hall, British admiral (b. 1870)
- October 23
  - André Antoine, French actor (b. 1858)
  - Ben Bernie, American jazz violinist (b. 1891)
  - Antonio Legnani, Italian admiral (automobile accident) (b. 1888)
  - Franceska Mann, Polish dancer (killed in Auschwitz concentration camp) (b. 1917)
- October 24 – Hector de Saint-Denys Garneau, Canadian poet, lawyer (b. 1912)
- October 26
  - Joseph E. Widener, American art collector and philanthropist (b. 1871)
  - Sir Aurel Stein, Hungarian-born British archaeologist (b. 1862)
- October 30 – Max Reinhardt, Austrian director (b. 1873)

=== November ===
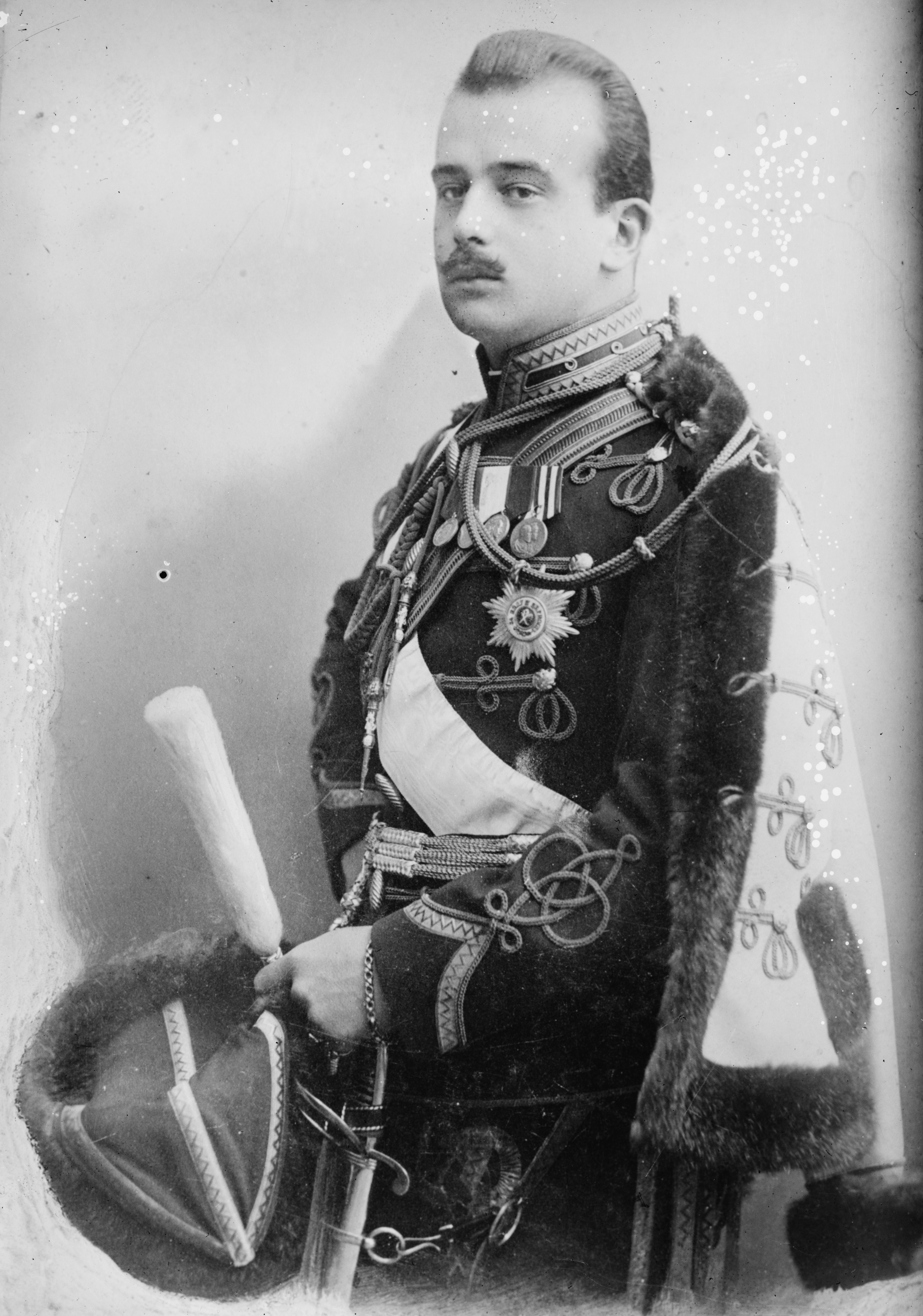
Grand Duke Boris Vladimirovich of Russia

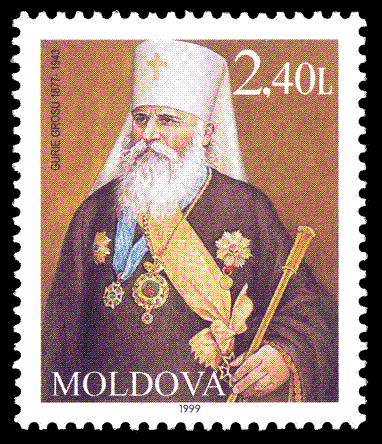
Metropolitan Gurie Grosu

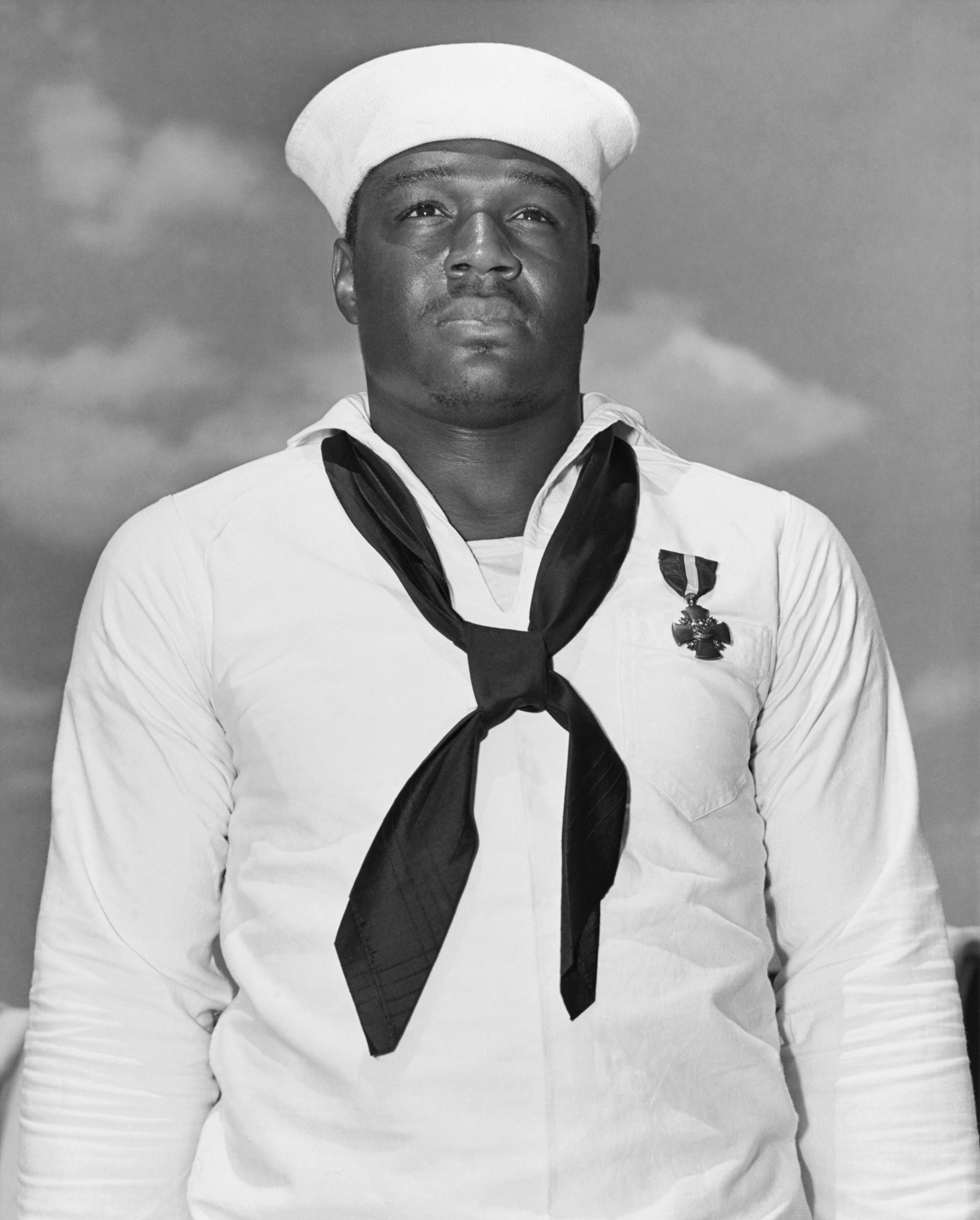
Doris Miller

- November 5
  - Samad Abdullayev, Soviet army officer (killed in action) (b. 1920)
  - Frank Campeau, American actor (b. 1864)
  - Idhomene Kosturi, Albanian politician, acting Prime Minister of Albania (b. 1873)
- November 7 – Dwight Frye, American character actor (b. 1899)
- November 9 – Grand Duke Boris Vladimirovich of Russia (b. 1877)
- November 10 – Blessed Lübeck martyrs, German Roman Catholic priests (executed):
  - Johannes Prassek (b. 1911)
  - Eduard Müller (b. 1911)
  - Hermann Lange (b. 1912)
  - Karl Friedrich Stellbrink (b. 1894)
- November 13 – Maurice Denis, French painter (b. 1870)
- November 14 – Gurie Grosu, Romanian Orthodox priest and metropolitan (b. 1877)
- November 19 – Baruch Lopes Leão de Laguna, Dutch painter (b. 1864)
- November 22
  - Lorenz Hart, American lyricist (b. 1895)
  - Keiji Shibazaki, Japanese admiral (killed in action) (b. 1894)
- November 23 – Charles Ray, American actor (b. 1891)
- November 24
  - France Balantič, Yugoslav poet (killed in action) (b. 1921)
  - Doris Miller, African-American sailor, Pearl Harbor survivor (killed in action) (b. 1919)
- November 25 – Renato Cialente, Italian film actor (b. 1897)
- November 26
  - Prince Hubertus of Saxe-Coburg and Gotha (b. 1909)
  - Edward "Butch" O'Hare, American fighter pilot (killed in action) (b. 1914)
- November 28 – Aleksander Hellat, Soviet politician (b. 1881)
- November 29 – Zsolt Harsányi, Hungarian author, dramatist, translator and writer (b. 1887)

=== December ===
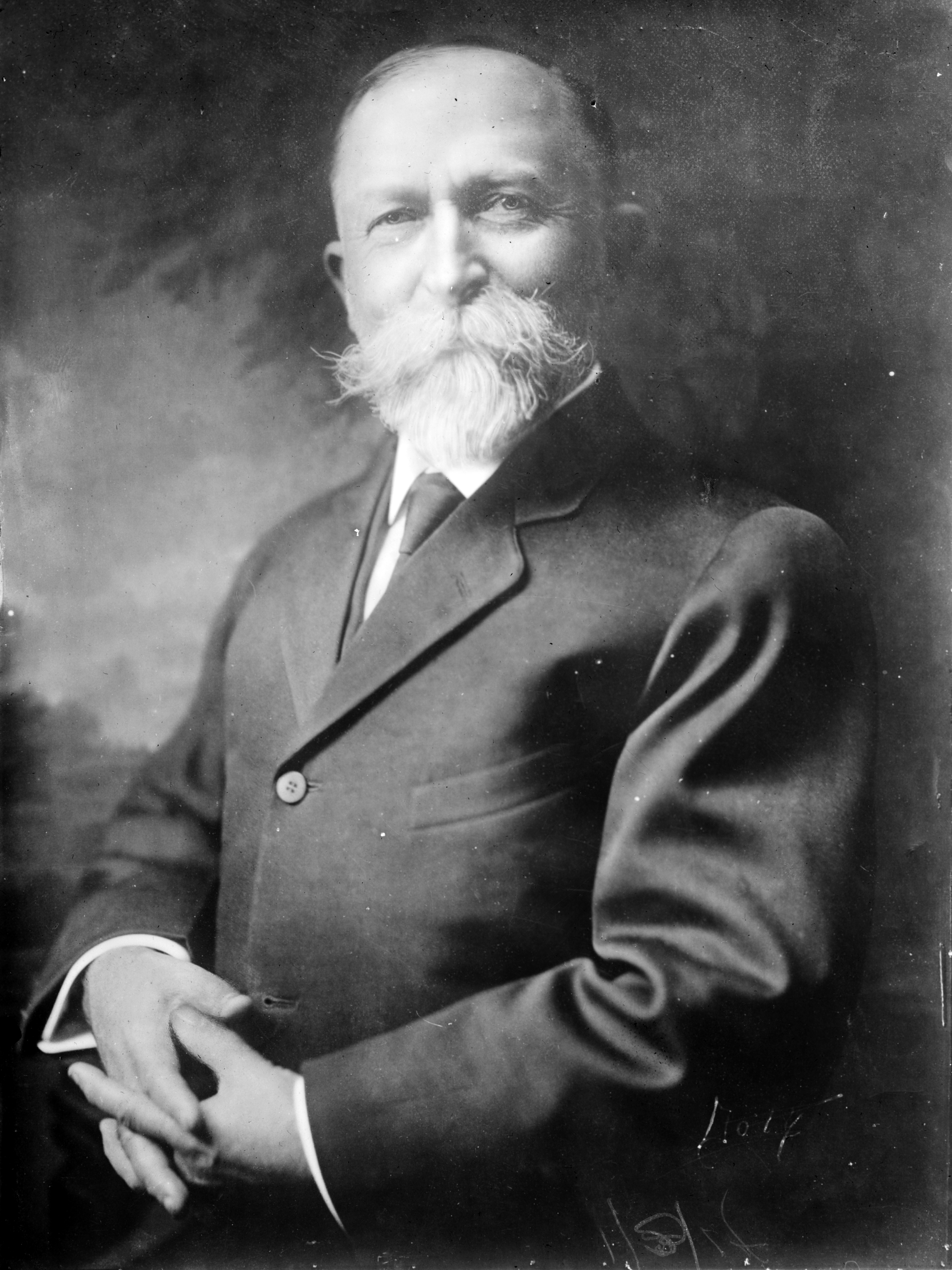
John Harvey Kellogg

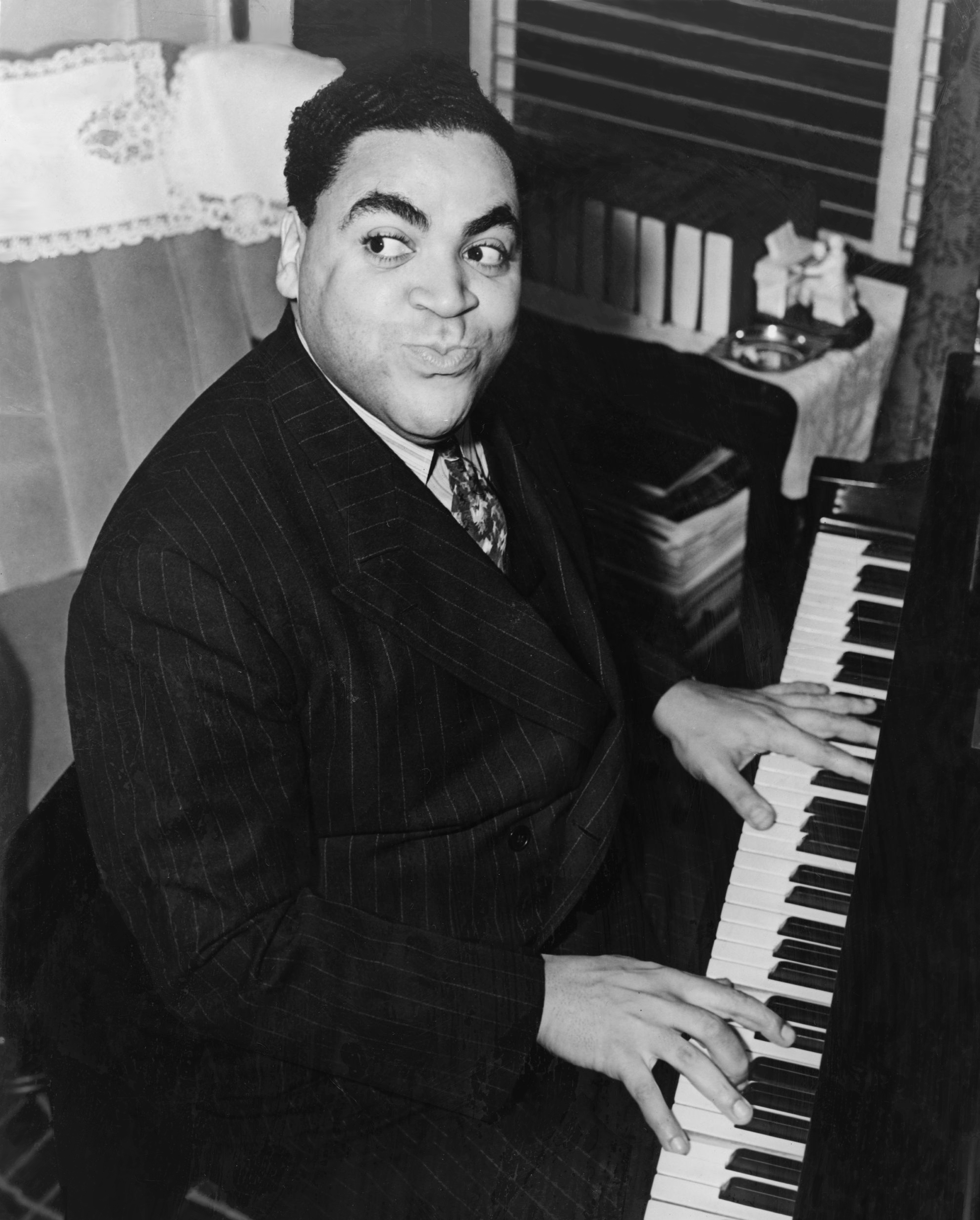
Fats Waller

- December 1
  - Antonio de Viti de Marco, Italian economist (b. 1858)
  - Damrong Rajanubhab, Thai prince, historian (b. 1862)
- December 2 – Nordahl Grieg, Norwegian poet, novelist, journalist and activist (killed in action as war correspondent) (b. 1902)
- December 6 – G. O. Smith, English sportsman (b. 1872)
- December 7 – Hamilton Lamb, Australian politician, soldier (in Japanese POW camp) (b. 1900)
- December 8 – Donald Mackintosh, British clergyman, Roman Catholic bishop and reverend (b. 1876)
- December 9
  - George Cooper, American silent film actor (b. 1892)
  - Georges Dufrénoy, French post-impressionist painter (b. 1870)
- December 10 – Charles Belcher, American film actor (b. 1872)
- December 13 – Erich Garske, German political activist (executed) (b. 1907)
- December 14 – John Harvey Kellogg, American physician, nutritionist (b. 1852)
- December 15 – Fats Waller, African-American jazz pianist (pneumonia) (b. 1904)
- December 18 – Hector Gray, British Royal Air Force officer (executed in Japanese Prisoner of War camp) (b. 1911)
- December 20 – Edward L. Beach Sr., American naval officer, author (b. 1867)
- December 22 – Beatrix Potter, British children's author, illustrator (b. 1866)
- December 23 – Sir Frederic Fisher, British admiral (b. 1851)
- December 25 – William Irving, German-born American film actor (b. 1893)
- December 26 – Erich Bey, German admiral (killed in action) (b. 1898)
- December 27
  - Rupert Julian, New Zealand actor, director (b. 1879)
  - Creelman MacArthur, Canadian businessman, politician (b. 1874)
- December 30 – Hobart Bosworth, American film actor, director, writer and producer (b. 1867)

== Nobel Prizes ==

- Physics – Otto Stern
- Chemistry – George de Hevesy
- Physiology or Medicine – Carl Peter Henrik Dam, Edward Adelbert Doisy
- Literature – not awarded
- Peace – not awarded
