= Stolterfoht =

Surname

Stolterfoht is a surname which may refer to:

- Barbara Stolterfoht, née Steger (1940; 2021), German politician (SPD) and Hessian State Minister for Women, Labour
- Jacob Stolterfoht (also Jacobus Stolterfot: 1600–1668), German Lutheran theologian and pastor
- Ulf Stolterfoht (born 1963), German writer
