= Bombing of Lübeck in World War II =

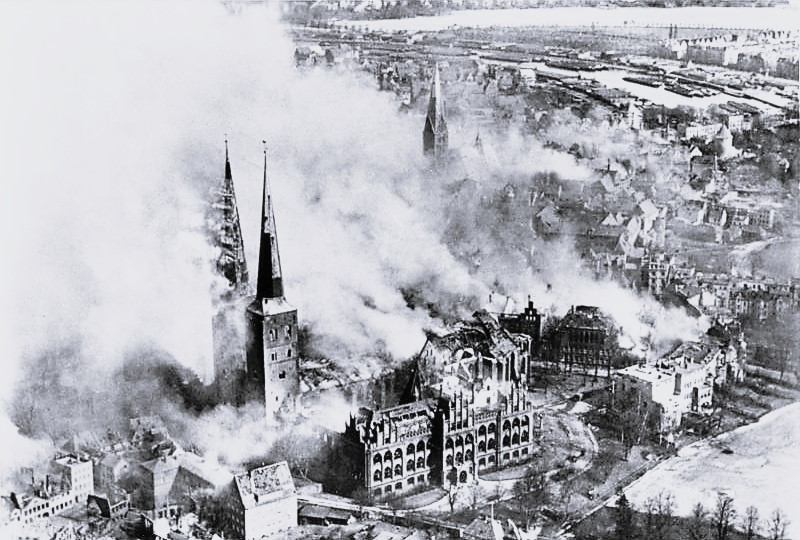
Lübeck Cathedral burning following the raids

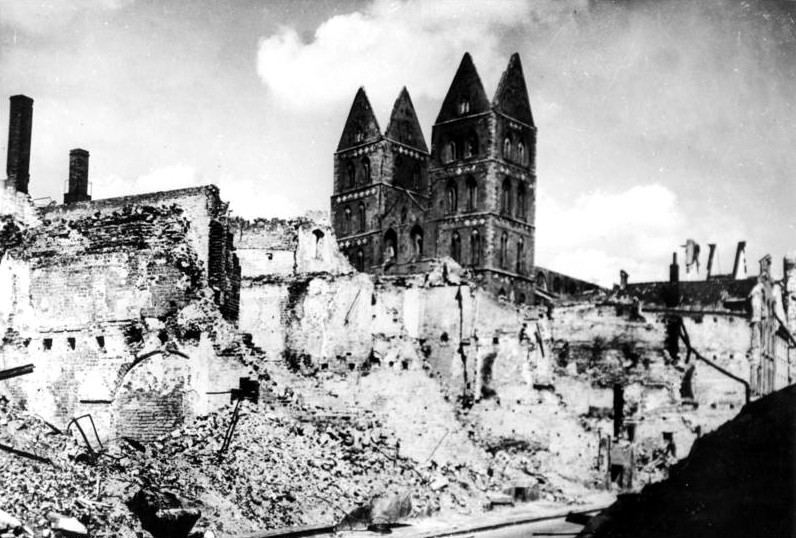
Ruins of the merchants' quarter west of St. Mary's

During World War II, the city of Lübeck was the first German city to be attacked in substantial numbers by the Royal Air Force. The attack on the night of 28 March 1942 created a firestorm that caused severe damage to the historic centre, with bombs destroying three of the main churches and large parts of the built-up area. It led to the retaliatory "Baedeker" raids on historic British cities.

Although a port, and home to several shipyards, including the Lübecker Flender-Werke, Lübeck was also a cultural centre and only lightly defended. The bombing followed the Area Bombing Directive issued to the RAF on 14 February 1942 which authorised the targeting of civilian areas.

== Main raid ==
Lübeck, a Hanseatic city and cultural centre on the shores of the Baltic Sea, was easy to find under the light of the full moon on the night of Saturday 28 March 1942 and the early hours of 29 March (Palm Sunday). Because of the hoar frost there was clear visibility and the waters of the Trave, the Elbe-Lübeck Canal, Wakenitz and the Bay of Lübeck were reflecting the moonlight. 234 Wellington and Stirling bombers dropped about 400 tons of bombs including 25,000 incendiary devices and a number of 1.8 tonne landmines. RAF Bomber Command lost twelve aircraft in the attack.

There were few defences, so some crews attacked as low as 600 metres (2,000 feet) although the average bombing height was just over 3000 metres (10,000 feet). The attack took place in three waves, the first, which arrived over Lübeck at 23:18, consisting of experienced crews in aircraft fitted with Gee electronic navigation systems (Lübeck was beyond the range of Gee but it helped with preliminary navigation). The raid finished at 02:58 on Sunday morning. 191 crews claimed successful attacks.

Blockbuster bombs in the first wave of the raid opened the brick and copper roofs of the buildings and the following incendiaries set them afire. 1,468 (or 7.1%) of the buildings in Lübeck were destroyed, 2,180 (10.6%) were seriously damaged and 9,103 (44.3%) were lightly damaged; these represented 62% of all buildings in Lübeck. The bombing of Lübeck struck a corridor about 300 metres (330 yards) wide from Lübeck Cathedral to St. Peter's Church, the town hall and St. Mary's Church. There was another minor area of damage north of the Aegidienkirche. St. Lorenz, a residential suburb in the west of the Holstentor, was severely damaged. The German police reported 301 people dead, three people missing, and 783 injured. More than 15,000 people lost their homes. (Note: 312 or 320 people killed (accounts conflict), 136 seriously and 648 slightly injured.)

The fires also reached parts of the old merchants' quarter, where homes, shops, offices, and warehouses stood packed close together. Firms in that district lost their premises, along with stock and records, to the blaze.

Arthur Harris, Air Officer Commanding Bomber Command, described Lübeck as "built more like a fire-lighter than a human habitation". He wrote of the raid that "[Lübeck] went up in flames" because "it was a city of moderate size of some importance as a port, and with some submarine building yards of moderate size not far from it. It was not a vital target, but it seemed to me better to destroy an industrial town of moderate importance than to fail to destroy a large industrial city". “However”, he continued, “the main object of the attack was to learn to what extent a first wave of aircraft could guide a second wave to the aiming point by starting a conflagration”. It was thus an experimental raid for the developing Bomber Command force. He goes on to describe that the loss of 5.5% of the attacking force was no more than to be expected on a clear moonlit night, but if that loss rate was to continue for any length of time RAF Bomber Command would not be able to "operate at the fullest intensity of which it were capable".

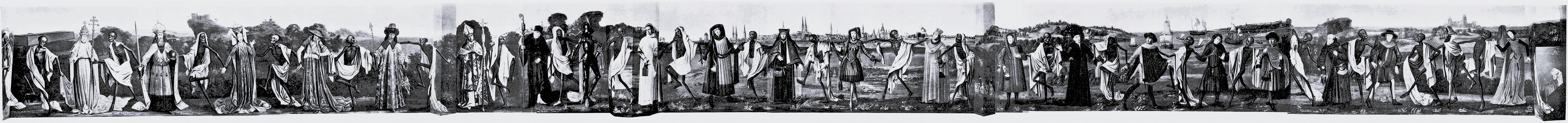
Bernt Notke's painting Totentanz (Danse macabre)

=== Aftermath and retaliation ===
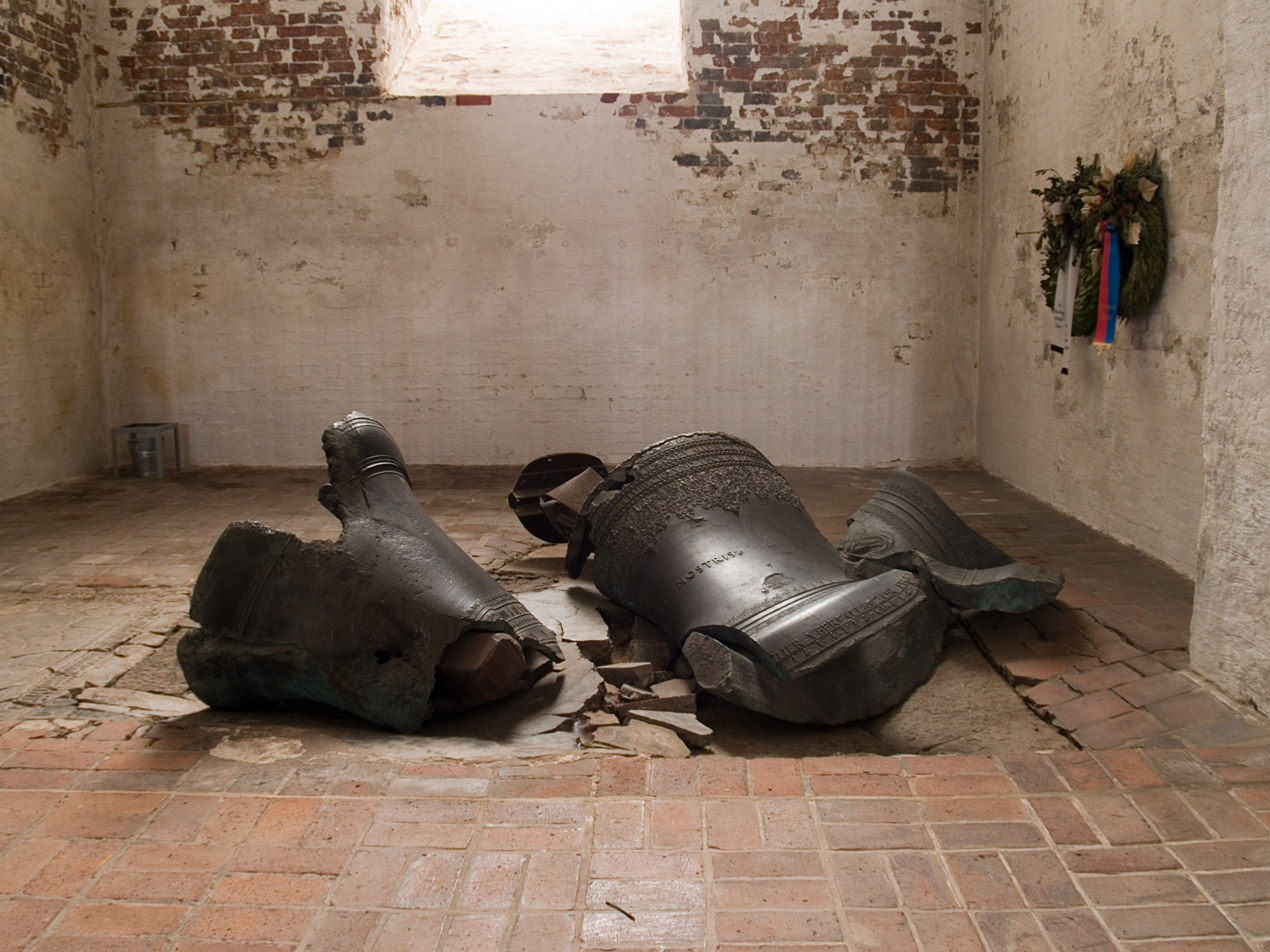
The broken bells of St. Mary's Church, which fell during the bombing of 1942, remain on the ground in the South Tower.

A. C. Grayling in his book, Among the Dead Cities, makes the point that as the Area Bombing Directive issued to the RAF on 14 February 1942 focused on undermining the "morale of the enemy civil population", Lübeck – with its many timbered medieval buildings – was chosen because the RAF "Air Staff were eager to experiment with a bombing technique using a high proportion of incendiaries" to help them carry out the directive. The RAF was well aware that the technique of using a high proportion of incendiaries during bombing raids was effective because cities such as Coventry had been subject to such attacks by the Luftwaffe during the Blitz. Winston Churchill wrote to the US President Franklin D. Roosevelt to inform him that similar "Coventry-scale" attacks would be mounted throughout the summer. The Soviet leader Joseph Stalin congratulated Churchill on the outcome, expressing his satisfaction at the "merciless bombing" and expressing the hope that such attacks would cause severe damage to German public morale – a key objective for Churchill. A series of follow-up attacks, taking much the same pattern, was mounted against Rostock between 24 and 27 April 1942.

The German authorities mounted a prompt relief operation for the city's dispossessed. 25,000 people had been left homeless by the raid. The local branch of the National Socialist People's Welfare (NSV) organisation opened food stores and distributed 1.8 million oranges, 10 tonnes of apples, 40,000 loaves of bread, 16,000 eggs, 5,000 pounds of butter, 3,500 cans of food, 2,800 boxes of smoked herring and 50 barrels of Bismarck herring. However, substantial amounts of luxury goods such as champagne, spirits, chocolates, clothing and shoes were pilfered by NSV officials. A number of them were arrested and in August 1942 three were sentenced to death for embezzlement with a further eleven jailed. The incident harmed the NSV's image, which had been positive up to that point.

The Nazi leadership was alarmed at the possible impact of the raid on civilian morale. In the opinion of Joseph Goebbels, the Propaganda Minister, the raid fulfilled the RAF's directive, as he wrote in his diary: "The damage is really enormous, I have been shown a newsreel of the destruction. It is horrible. One can well imagine how such a bombardment affects the population." He commented: "Thank God, it is a North German population, which on the whole is much tougher than the Germans in the south or south-east. We can't get away from the fact that the English air-raids have increased in scope and importance; if they can be continued on these lines, they might conceivably have a demoralising effect on the population." Despite Goebbels' fears, civilian morale in Lübeck held up and the effect of the bombing on the city's economic life was soon overcome. To help offset the damage the raid had on German morale, the German hierarchy launched a well publicized raid on Exeter on 23 April 1942, which was the first of the "Baedeker raids".

== Red Cross port ==
In 1944 Eric Warburg, liaison officer between US Army Air Forces and RAF, and Swiss diplomat Carl Jacob Burckhardt, as president of the International Committee of the Red Cross, declared the Lübeck port a Red Cross port to supply (under the Geneva Convention) allied prisoners of war in German custody with ships under Swedish flag from Gothenburg, which protected the city from further Allied air strikes. The mail and the food was brought to the POW camps all over Germany by truck under supervision of the Swedish Red Cross and its vice president Folke Bernadotte, who was in charge of the White Buses too. (Bernadotte met Heinrich Himmler in Lübeck in spring 1945, when Himmler made his offer of surrender to the allies.)

== Lübeck martyrs ==
A group of three Catholic clergymen, Johannes Prassek, Eduard Müller and Hermann Lange, and an Evangelical Lutheran pastor, Karl Friedrich Stellbrink, were arrested following the raid, tried by the People's Court in 1943 and sentenced to death by decapitation; all were beheaded on 10 November 1943, in the Hamburg prison at Holstenglacis. Stellbrink had explained the raid next morning in his Palm Sunday sermon as a "trial by ordeal", which the Nazi authorities interpreted to be an attack on their system of government and as such undermined morale and aided the enemy.

== Film ==
The bombing of the city served as the climax of the 1944 German film The Degenhardts directed by Werner Klingler. The film, featuring the home front activities of a family in Lübeck, attempted to use the raid as moral justification for continued resistance against the Allies.

== Reconstruction and memorial ==
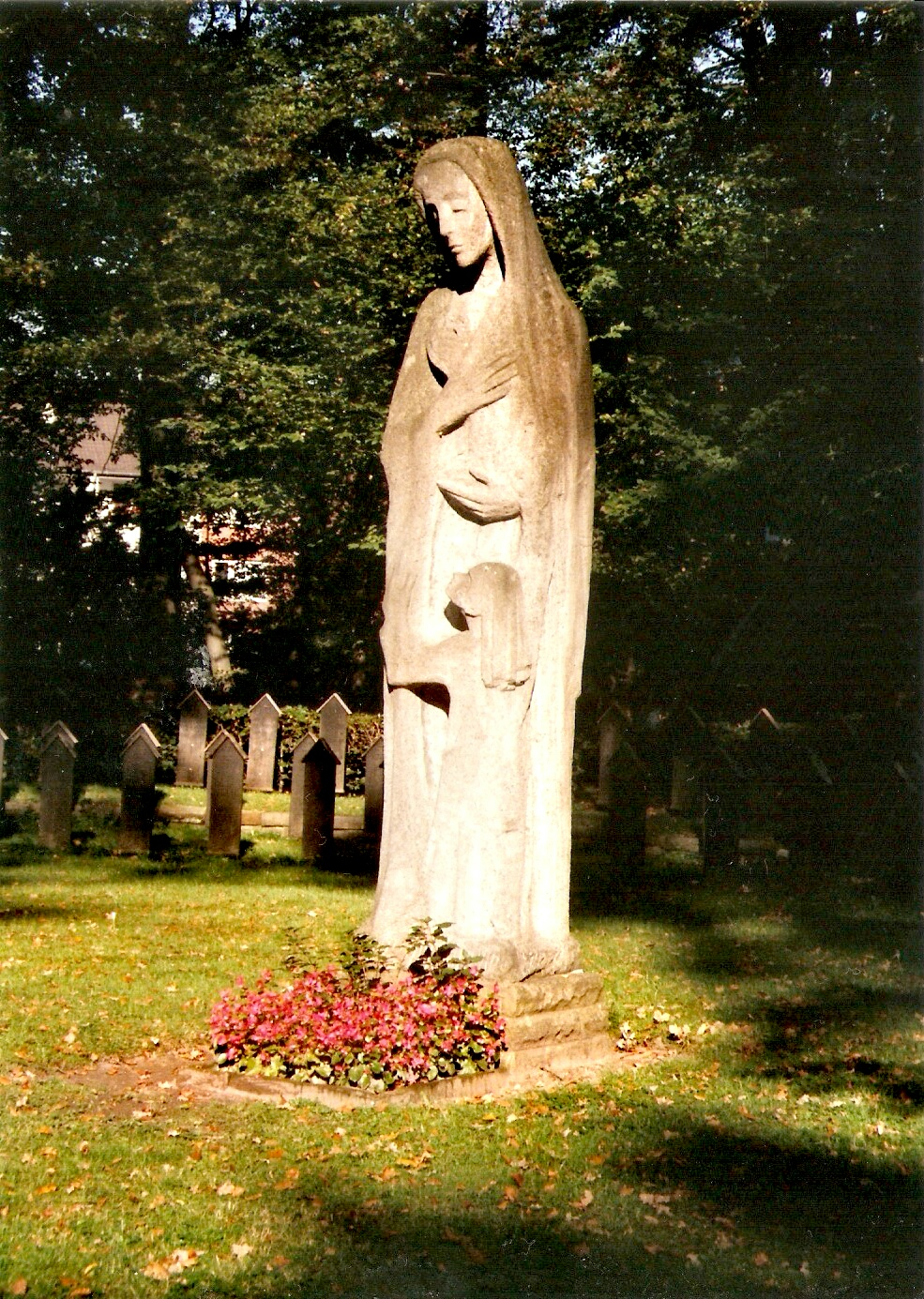
Joseph Krautwald's The Mother

Under wartime and postwar conditions it took until 1948 to remove most of the construction waste and demolition rubble. The remaining and the rebuilt parts of the old town are now part of the World Heritage Site. The bells that fell from the burning tower of St. Mary's church in a partly melted state have been left in the south tower as a memorial to the event. (See above) Since the reconstruction of St. Mary had priority, the reconstruction of the cathedral was not finished before 1982, the reconstruction of St. Peter not before 1986.

Another memorial to the people who were killed or displaced by the bombing is found in the Lübeck Ehrenfriedhof (cemetery) where there is a cenotaph and memorials to both wars. The memorial of the bombing of Lübeck is a statue by the sculptor Joseph Krautwald, who was commissioned in the 1960s to produce a work that reflected the experience of the victims. The statue, named Die Mutter (the mother), was carved from local coquina and shows a mourning woman with two little children. It is placed in the center of the circle surrounded by the tombstones of those who died that night.

== Chronology of air raids on Lübeck ==
- 28/29 March 1942: first and main RAF raid, followed by some minor raids in connection with the bombing of other north German cities as targets.
- 16 July 1942: 21 Stirlings in an RAF raid. Only 8 aircraft reported bombing the main target; 2 Stirlings were lost.
- 24/25 July 1943: first raid of the Battle of Hamburg, 13 RAF Mosquitos carried out diversionary and nuisance raids to Bremen, Kiel, Lübeck and Duisburg.
- 25 August 1944 (Eighth Air Force Mission 570): 81 B-24s bombed aircraft component plants, a rifle factory and steel fabrication plant in Lübeck – local sources reported 110 dead including 39 Zwangsarbeiter (forced (slave) laborers).
- 15/16 September 1944: diversionary raid by 9 RAF Mosquitoes. The main raid was on Kiel with other cities hit by diversionary raids.
- 2/3 April 1945: training raid by one RAF aircraft.
- 3 May 1945 in a tactical operation the USAAF Ninth Air Force flew armed reconnaissance around Kiel and Lübeck, and A-26 Invaders of the XXIX Tactical Air Command (Provisional) hit shipping in the Kiel-Lübeck area.

== See also ==
- The tragedy of the sinking of the SS Cap Arcona on 3 May 1945 happened on the Bay of Lübeck close to the port of Neustadt in Holstein and not in Lübeck itself.
- Bath Blitz

== General references ==
- Graßmann, Antjekathrin (1989). Lübeckische Geschichte. (Lübeck's history). 934 p., Lübeck. ISBN 3-7950-3203-2
- Grayling, Anthony Clifford (2006). Among the Dead Cities: Was the Allied Bombing of Civilians in WWII a Necessity or a Crime?. London: Bloomsbury Publishing. pp. 50–51. ISBN 978-0-7475-7671-6. OCLC 1391179967. OL 22239519M. Wikidata Q136472797.
- Harris, Arthur (1947). Bomber Offensive, Pen & Sword, (Paperback 2005), ISBN 1-84415-210-3; p. 105
- Royal Air Force Bomber Command 60th Anniversary: Bomber Command Campaign Diary
