= Bord (surname) =

Bord is a surname. Notable people with the surname include:

- André Bord, French politician
- James Bord (born 1981), English poker player and entrepreneur
- Stefanie Bord, American politician

== See also ==
- Bords
- Bording
