= Bording =

Bording may refer to:

== People ==
- Anders Bording (1619–1677), Danish poet
- Jacob Bording (1511–1560), Flemish medical doctor and physician
- Jakob Bording (1547–1616), German-born Danish politician

== Places ==
- Bording, Denmark, a railway town in Central Jutland, Denmark
