= Lübeck martyrs =

Pastors executed by the Nazi regime

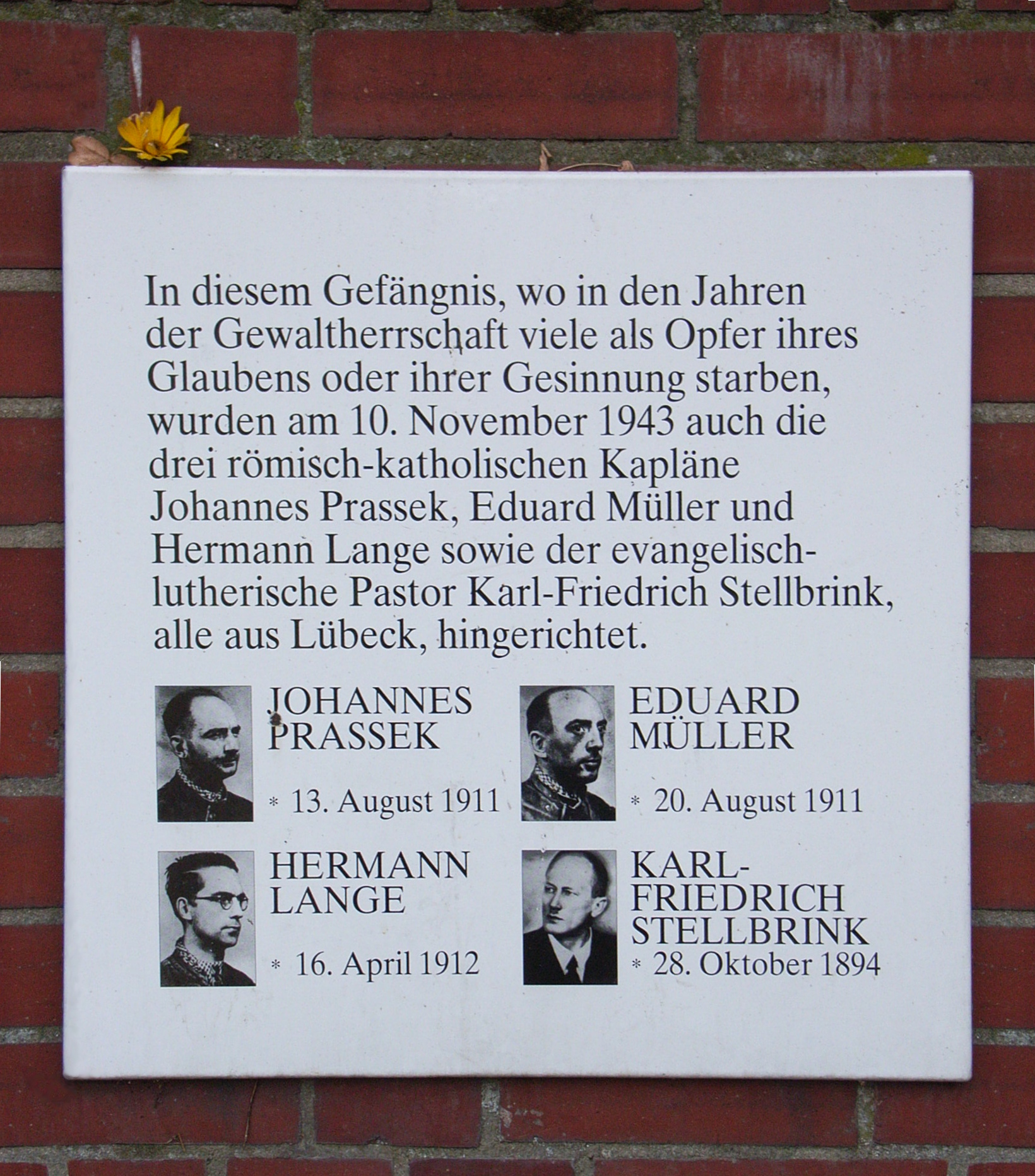
Memorial plaque, prison walls, Hamburg investigative custody centre

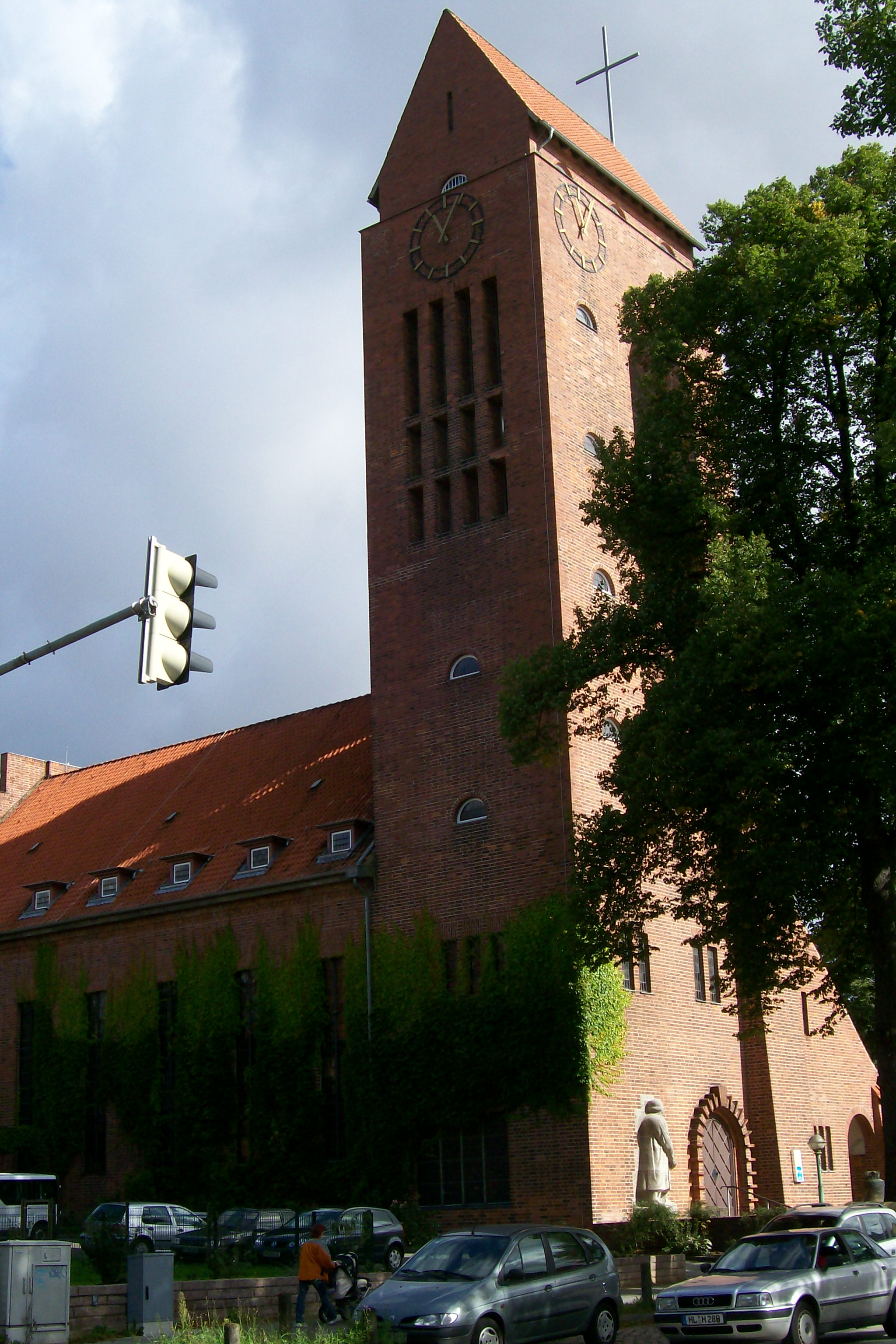
The Lutherkirche in Lübeck is dedicated to the three Catholic clerics and their Evangelical Lutheran colleague Karl Friedrich Stellbrink

The Lübeck Martyrs were three Roman Catholic priests – Johannes Prassek, Eduard Müller and Hermann Lange – and the Evangelical-Lutheran pastor Karl Friedrich Stellbrink. All four were executed by beheading on 10 November 1943 less than 3 minutes apart from each other at Hamburg's Holstenglacis Prison (then called Untersuchungshaftanstalt Hamburg-Stadt, in English: Investigative Custody Centre of the City of Hamburg). Eyewitnesses reported that the blood of the four clergymen literally ran together on the guillotine and on the floor. This impressed contemporaries as a symbol of the ecumenical character of the men's work and witness. That interpretation is supported by their last letters from prison, and statements they themselves made during their time of suffering, torture and imprisonment. "We are like brothers," Hermann Lange said.

== History ==
The Catholic priests worked at the Sacred Heart Church in the centre of Lübeck, Prassek as a chaplain, Müller as assistant minister and Lange as vicar. Stellbrink was pastor of the city's Lutherkirche (Luther Church). The four had been close friends since 1941, exchanging information and ideas, and sharing sermons, including those of Clemens August Graf von Galen, Catholic bishop of Münster.

In his Palm Sunday sermon, 29 March 1942, Stellbrink said "In the misery of our home city we hear God's voice" [quoted from Stellbrink's Statement given during interrogation 9 April 1942] which some had interpreted then as Stellbrink meaning God's judgment upon the city was expressed in the effects of a British air raid on Lübeck the previous night. More than 300 people had been killed, the worst civilian casualties in an Allied bombing raid up to that time in the war.

Stellbrink was arrested on 7 April 1942, followed by Prassek on 18 May, Lange on 15 June, and Müller on 22 June. In addition to the clerics, a further 18 Catholic lay people were arrested, including Stephan Pfürtner, who later became a moral theologian.

A year later, between 22 and 23 June 1943, the trial of the four men took place before the second chamber of the People's Court, with Wilhelm Crohne presiding. He had journeyed to Lübeck specifically for the trial. Following Joseph Goebbels' directive that the People's Court's judges "must base their decisions less on law and more on the basic idea that the law-breakers be removed from the national community", the clerics were sentenced to death for 'broadcasting crime [specifically, listening to enemy broadcasts], treasonable support for the enemy and demoralisation of the Armed Forces'. Some of their co-accused lay brethren received long prison sentences. The trial became known as the "Lübeck Christians' Trial", an indication of the anti-Christian bias in the proceedings.

The clerics were immediately transferred to Hamburg's Holstenglacis Prison, which had become the regional center for executions in 1936 and had added an execution building with permanently mounted guillotine in 1938. The Catholic bishop under whose care the Catholic priests fell, Wilhelm Berning (Diocese of Osnabrück) visited the priests in prison and wrote a plea for clemency, which was rejected. Pastor Stellbrink received no support from his Province's church authorities, and prior to his execution was ejected from Holy Orders because of his conviction. The four clerics were guillotined on 10 November 1943.

== Karl Friedrich Stellbrink (28 October 1894 – 10 November 1943) ==
Son of a customs official, Karl Friedrich Stellbrink served in the First World War until he was medically discharged in 1917 with a crippling wound to his hand. After completing his Lutheran theology studies, he was ordained in 1921 to the Evangelical Church of Prussia's older Provinces. In the early days of the Nazi regime he was briefly caught up by the political movement and joined the Party. He soon realized, however, its inhumanity and incompatibility with Christian teaching. He was called before a Nazi Party investigative board when he refused to break off his friendships with Jews. He quit the Party in 1937.

After his death, Stellbrink's widow was billed for his court costs, imprisonment, and execution.

Fifty years would pass before the North Elbian Evangelical Lutheran Church, successor of the Lübeck Lutheran church body, would initiate court proceedings to clear Stellbrink's name and admit their shame at how this noble martyr had been treated. In November 1993, the German courts officially overturned the guilty verdict against him.

== Johannes Prassek (13 August 1911 – 10 November 1943) ==
Johannes Prassek was ordained to the Catholic priesthood in 1937. Father Prassek was assigned to Herz-Jesu Church together with Eduard Müller and Hermann Lange. He openly warned soldiers and youth groups against antisemitism, and protested the shooting of prisoners and Jews. Under German law at that time, such words were subject to the death penalty if reported to the Gestapo. Because of his sympathy for Polish workers who were forced laborers in the area, Father Prassek learned Polish so he could minister to them. Again, such ministry was illegal and could have led to his arrest, but the Gestapo never found out.

== Eduard Müller (20 August 1911 – 10 November 1943) ==
Eduard Müller grew up in a very poor family, and he first trained to become a joiner, prior to studying for the priesthood. Ordained as a Catholic priest in 1940, he served at the Herz-Jesu Church. His youth group work and a discussion group he directed were very popular. Having experienced trade training himself probably gave him special rapport with young journeymen of the discussion group he led.

== Hermann Lange (16 April 1912 – 10 November 1943) ==
Hermann Lange was an intellectual preacher. He told young soldiers, in discussions, that participation in a war was strongly against the Christian faith. He wrote in a letter from prison on 25 July 1943 about the ecumenical consequences of the sufferings he and his fellow Catholics had shared with their Lutheran neighbors, even prior to the shared arrests and imprisonment: "The common sufferings of the past few years have brought about a rapprochement of the two Churches. The imprisonment of the Catholic and Protestant clergy is a symbol both of their joint suffering and of the rapprochement."

== Honors and Beatification ==
On the 60th anniversary of the executions, the Catholic archbishop of Hamburg Werner Thissen announced the start of the beatification process for the Lübeck Martyrs. At the same time, bishop Bärbel Wartenberg-Potter, bishop for the Holstein-Lübeck district of the North Elbe province of the Evangelical Lutheran church, announced the setting up of an ecumenical campaign group to ensure a memorial for all four men. The beatification took place on 25 June 2011.

The crypt of the Herz-Jesu Kirche and the gallery of the Lutherkirche in Lübeck are dedicated to the memory of the four clerics.

== Literature ==
- Josef Schäfer (ed.): Wo seine Zeugen sterben ist sein Reich: Briefe der enthaupteten Lübecker Geistlichen und Berichte von Augenzeugen. Hamburg 1946 (in German).

English meaning: Where his witnesses die, there is his kingdom: letters of the beheaded Lübeck clerics and eyewitness reports

- Else Pelke: Der Lübecker Christenprozess 1943., Mainz 1961/1974 (in German).

English meaning: The 1943 trial of Lübeck Christians

- Ingaburgh Klatt: 'Lösch mir die Augen aus ...': Leben und gewaltsames Sterben der vier Lübecker Geistlichen in der Zeit des Nationalsozialismus, eine Ausstellung im Burgkloster zu Lübeck vom 8. November 1993 bis zum 10. November 1994. In: Demokratische Geschichte: Jahrbuch zur Arbeiterbewegung und Demokratie in Schleswig-Holstein 8 (1993), S. 205–280 (in German).

English meaning: Close my eyes in death: the life and violent death of four Lübeck clerics during the National Socialist period. An exhibition in Lübeck's Burgkloster church 8 November 1993 – 10 November 1994. In Democratic history: annals of the workers' movement and democracy in Schleswig-Holstein 8 (1993), pp 205 – 280

- Martin Merz: 'Die Pfaffen aufs Schafott': ein Lübecker Prozess vor 50 Jahren, Begleitheft zur Ausstellung 'Lösch mir die Augen aus ...'; Leben und gewaltsames Sterben der vier Lübecker Geistlichen in der Zeit des Nationalsozialismus; überarb. Manuskript einer Rundfunksendung im Rahmen der Reihe 'Religion und Gesellschaft' am 6. August 1993 im Dritten Programm des Norddeutschen Rundfunks, Lübeck 1993 (in German).

English meaning: Priests on the scaffold: a Lübeck trial from 50 years ago. Guidebook to the exhibition 'Close my eyes in death: the life and violent death of four Lübeck clerics during the National Socialist period'. Edited manuscript of radio broadcast as part of the series Religion and society, 6 August 1993, NDR 3rd programme

- Zeugen für Christus. Das deutsche Martyrologium des 20. Jahrhunderts, hrsg. von Helmut Moll im Auftrag der Deutschen Bischofskonferenz. Bd. 1., Paderborn 1999. S. 249–257 (in German).

English meaning: Witnesses for Christ: a list of 20th century German martyrs. Published by Helmut Moll on behalf of the German Bishops' Conference. Vol. 1 (Paderborn, 1999), pp 249 – 257

- Ökumene im Widerstand. Der Lübecker Christenprozeß 1943., Lübeck 2001 (in German).

English meaning: The churches resisting together: the 1943 trial of Christians in Lübeck

- Peter Voswinckel: Nach 61 Jahren komplett. Abschiedsbriefe der Vier Lübecker Märtyrer im historischen Kontext. In: Zeitschrift des Vereins für Lübeckische Geschichte und Altertumskunde 85 (2005), S. 279 – 330 (in German)

English meaning: The full story after 61 years: the final letters of the four Lübeck martyrs in their historical context. In Journal of the Lübeck Society for the Study of History and Antiquity, vol. 85 (2005), pp 279 – 330

- Isabella Spolovjnak-Pridat und Helmut Siepenkort (publishers): Ökumene im Widerstand. Der Lübecker Christenprozess 1943, Lübeck 2006 (in German).

English meaning: The churches resisting together: the 1943 trial of Christians in Lübeck

- Peter Voswinckel: Geführte Wege. Die Lübecker Märtyrer in Wort und Bild, Butzon & Bercker / St. Ansgar Verlag, Hamburg 2010 (in German).

English meaning: He guided their paths: the Lübeck martyrs in word and deed

- Sebastian von Melle: Hermann Lange, in: Hirschberg, published by Bund Neudeutschland (Catholic youth organisation) - KMF e. V., 09-2010, p 572-577 (in German).
