= Lucas Bacmeister (theologian) =

Lutheran theologian and church music composer

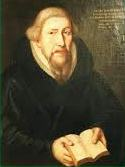
- Lucas Bacmeister
- Born: 18 October 1530; Lüneburg, Germany
- Died: 9 July 1608 (aged 77)
- Occupations: theologian and church music composer

Lucas Bacmeister (18 October 1530 – 9 July 1608) was a Lutheran theologian and church music composer.

Alternative spellings of Bacmeister which may be encountered in sources include Backmeister and Bacmeisterus. Lucas Bacmeister (1530–1608) is sometimes identified as Lucas Bacmeister the elder in order to differentiate him from his younger son, Lucas Bacmeister the younger (1570–1638) who was also a Lutheran Theologian of note.

== Life ==
Lucas Bacmeister was born in Lüneburg, a short distance inland/upriver from Hamburg. Johannes Bacmeister, his father, was a master brewer. His mother, born Anna Lübbing, also came from a prominent family in the town. In 1548 he enrolled at the Leucorea University in Wittenberg. In order to avoid the plague which was lingering in Wittenberg he moved again in 1552, this time to the court of King Christian of Denmark where he was employed till 1555 as a tutor to the king's children, the princes Magnus and Johann. In 1555 he returned to Wittenberg and resumed his own studies, obtaining a Magister degree in 1557. In 1558 he was accepted as an Adjunct to the Philosophy faculty and switched to the study of Jurisprudence and then Theology.

In 1559 he relocated to Kolding where he was employed by the widowed Dorothea of Saxe-Lauenburg as court preacher. On the recommendation of Philip Melanchthon he then went on to Rostock where at Easter 1562 he took over the post of Superintendent, simultaneously also becoming a Teacher/Professor of Theology at the university. To validate his appointment as a professor he was required to achieve a doctorate, which he did in 1564. In 1574 he was in Lübeck on account of the Saliger Conflicts ("... wegen des Saligerschen Streites ").

In 1581 the Protestant authorities ("evangelischen Stände") in Lower Austria appointed Bacmeister to lead a visitation during the course of which he examined the preaching in four synodical assemblies: for the Manhartisberg region in Horn, for the Wienerwald region in Schallaburg, for the "unter dem Wienerwald" region in Castle Rodaun and for the "unter dem Manhartsberg" region in Feldsberg and Enzersdorf. In the context of the intensification of the political tensions arising from the Reformation, the exercise can be seen as part of a larger push to counter the rise of Flacian fundamentalism. Later in 1581 he visited Bremen in connection with issues involving the Sacrament. (The city was experiencing intense rivalries between different interpretations of protestantism at this time.) 1582 found Bacmeister in Güstrow in connection with the Apologetics over the Book of Concord.

Of particular significance for Mecklenburg church history was Bacmeister's "Bann", written for the Rostock church ministry, which retained canonical legal authority for a long time. Later he also controlled the final version of the Mecklenburg Church Ordinance of 1602, after its original author, David Chytraeus, left it incomplete when he died in 1600. Bacmeister had also produced, in 1577, the Rostock Hymnal which opened the way for Joachim Burmeister church music publications. Bacmeister's own hymn "Ach leue Her im höchsten thron" appeared in 1565 during the depths of the Rostock plague outbreak.

== Patriarch ==
Through the fecundity of his first marriage Lucas Bacmeister became the ancestor of some distinguished branches of the Bacmeister family, several of which continue to flourish. His first marriage took place in Kolding in 1560. His bride was Johanna Bording (1544–1584), the daughter of the Rostock Professor of Medicine Jacob Bording and his Avignon born wife, Francesca Negrone.

This first marriage produced ten recorded sons and one daughter. These included the Hebrew scholar and Lutheran theologiamn Jacob Bacmeister (1562–1591), the medical professor Johann Bacmeister (1563–1631), the theologian Lucas Bacmeister the younger (1570–1638)) and the physician Matthäus Bacmeister (1580–1626). Another son, Heinrich Bacmeister (1584–1628), became a lawyer and married Sara Dorothea Reiser (1599–1634) from Lübeck, becoming the progenitor of what became the Württemberg Bacmeister line. The daughter, Margaretha (1568–1641), married the Lübeck pastor Johann Stolterfoht, becoming the mother of Jacob Stolterfoht.

After his first wife died Lucas Bacmeister married Katharina Beselin (1536–1593), widow of the Rostock municipal leader Johannes Herverden. When she died he married Anna Vischer (ca. 1560–1638) from Aalst in Flanders. As far as is known, however, the second and third marriages were childless.

== Output (selection) ==
- Formae precationum piarum collectae ex scriptis Ph. Melanchthonis. Wittenberg 1559, 1560, 1588
- Von christlichen Bann, kurtzer und gründlicher Bericht aus Gottes Wort und aus Dr. M. Lutheri Schriften, durch die Diener der Kirche Christie zu Rostock zusammengetragen. Rostock 1565
- De modo concionandi. Rostock 1570, 1598
- Historia ecclesiarum Rostoch s. narratio de initio et progressu Lutheranismi Rostochio. (bei Westphalen vol. I., Sp. 1553)
- Verschiedene Disputationen über biblisch theologische Fragen (so 1569 üb. sacerdotium u. sacrificium Christi nach d. Hebräerbrief) und einige bibelkundliche Arhh.; Hist. ecclesiae et Ministerii Rostochiensis. herausgegeben von E. J. von Westphalen. In: Monumenta inedita rerum Germanicarum praecipue Cimbricarum et Megalopolitensium. vol. 1, Leipzig 1739, Sp.1553-1656.
