= Sacred Heart Church, Lübeck =

Main Roman Catholic church in Lübeck

Coordinates: 53°51′45″N 10°41′04″E

Sacred Heart Church
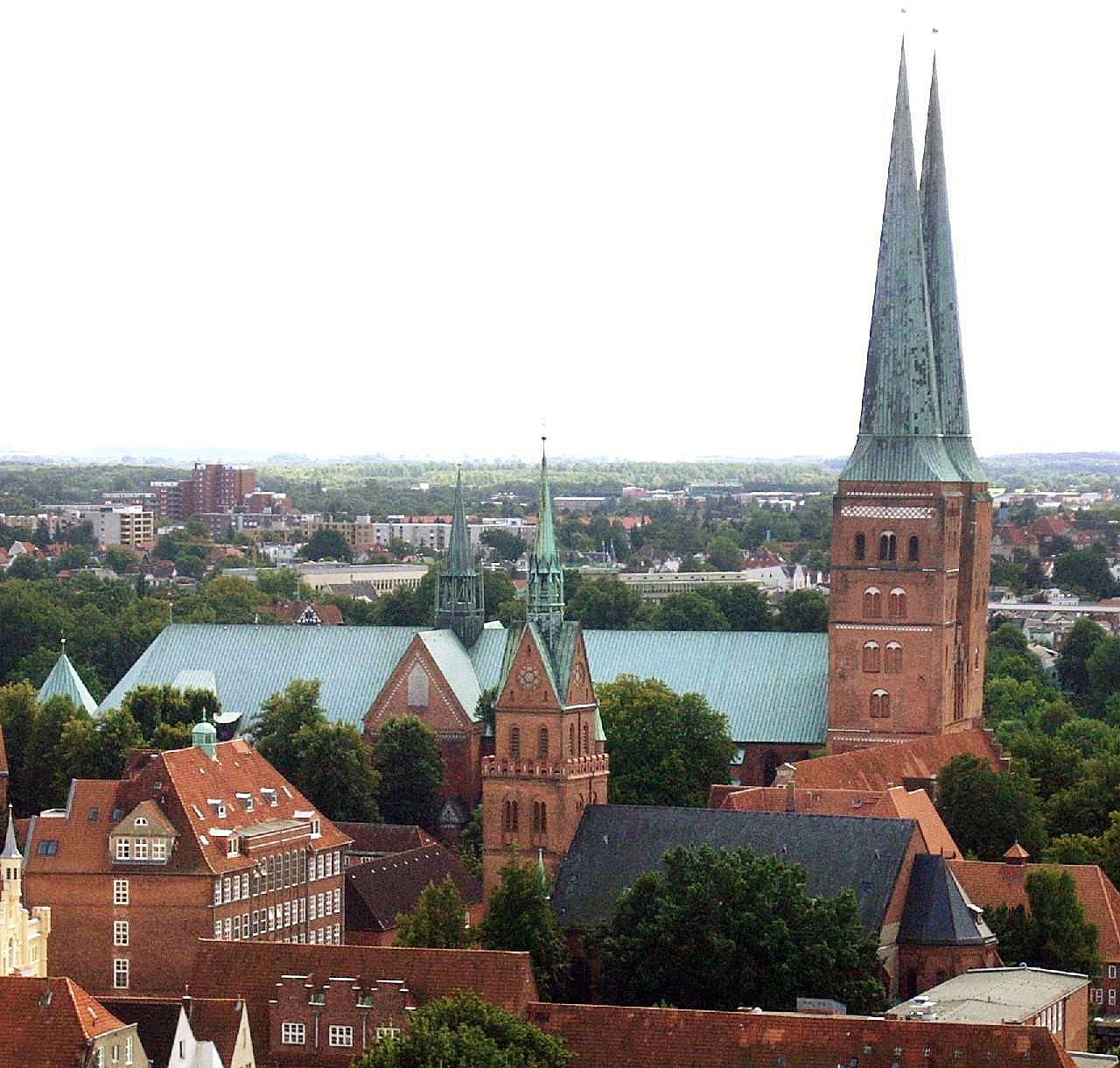
- Sacred Heart Church, with Lübeck Cathedral in the background.
- Interactive map of the Sacred Heart Church area

General information
- Architectural style: Gothic
- Location: Lübeck, Germany
- Construction started: 1888
- Completed: 10 May 1891

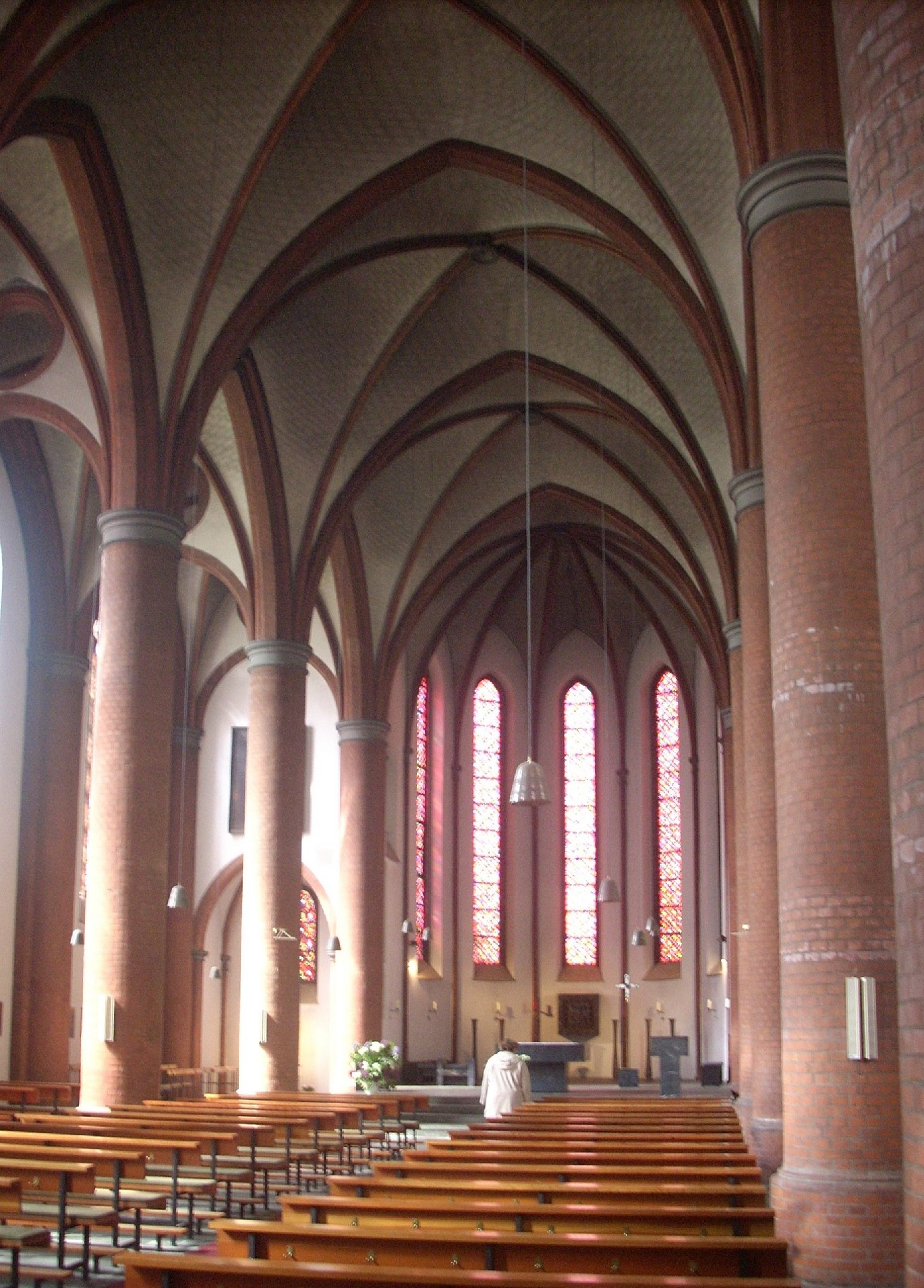
Interior of the church

The Sacred Heart Church (German: Propsteikirche Herz Jesu) is the main Roman Catholic church in Lübeck. It was built in 1888 and consecrated on 10 May 1891.

The three Catholic priests among the Lübeck martyrs served at Sacred Heart Church.
