= Jacob Stolterfoht =

German Lutheran theologian and leading pastor

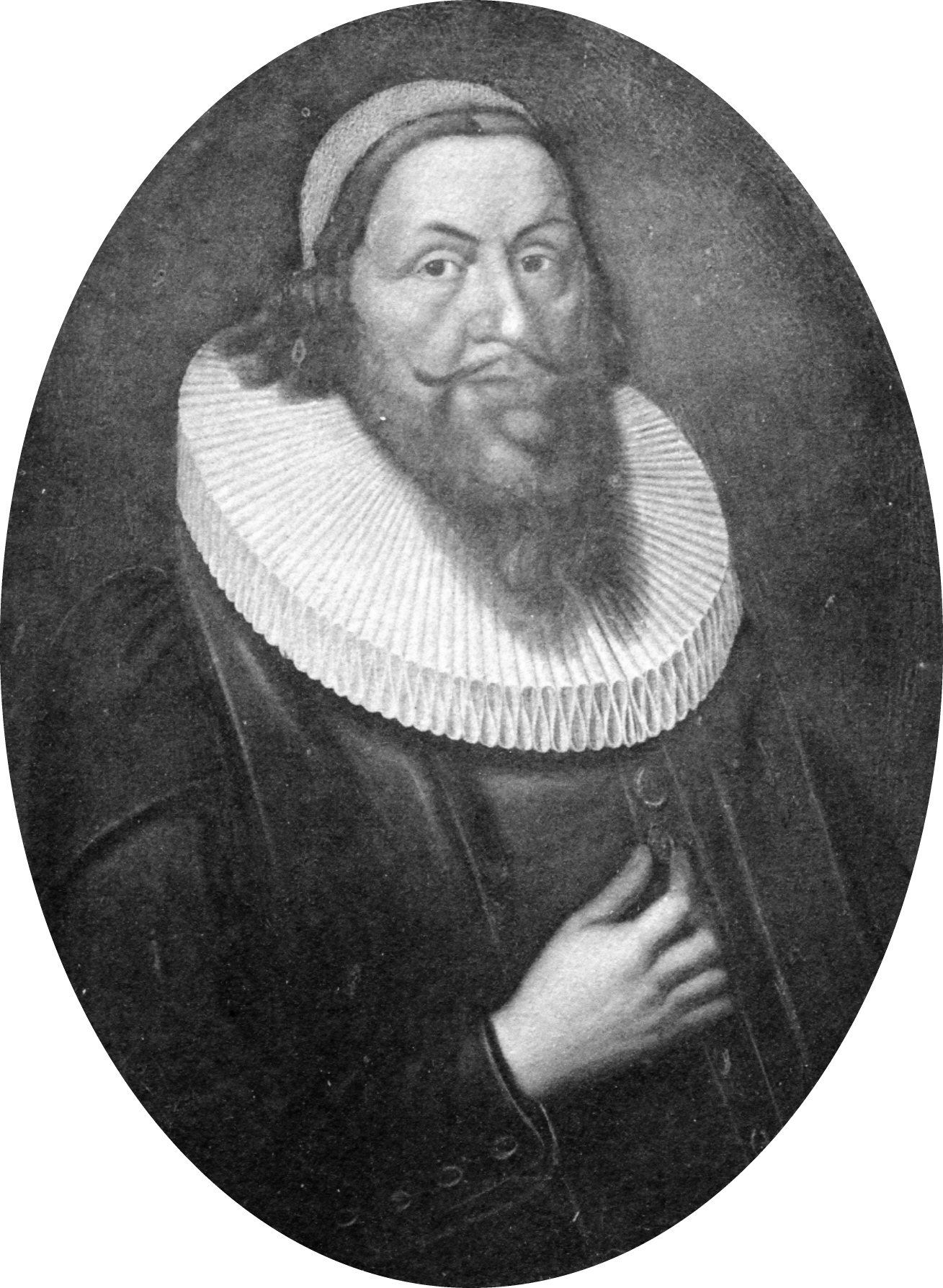
Jacob Stolterfoht Matthias Black, 1668)

Jacob Stolterfoht (also Jacobus Stolterfot: 20 July 1600 – 4 March 1668) was a German Lutheran theologian and leading pastor in Lübeck during and directly following the Thirty Years' War. (The city remained neutral, but its trade and prosperity were nevertheless devastated by the war and its aftermath.)

== Life ==
Stolterfoht was one of the youngest of the ten children of the Lübeck pastor Johann Stolterfoht (1555–1622) and his wife, born Margaretha Bacmeister (1568–1641), the only daughter of another north German theologian. In the first part of 1620 Jacob enrolled at the University of Rostock to study theology. He moved on to Wittemberg in 1621 and from there to Greifswald, where he studied between 1622 and 1623. He then returned to Rostock, where he concluded his university-level education and in 1624 received his Master's degree.

On 2 June 1626 he was appointed a deacon and joined the team of preachers at Lübeck's Marienkirche (St. Mary's Church), the principal church in the city. (His father, at the time of his death in 1622, had been a leading member of the pastoral team at the church.) On 27 September 1649 he was selected to succeed Michael Siricius (who had died the previous December) as chief pastor (Hofprediger) of the Marienkirche. Stolterfoht was an important priest and theologian: his reputation meant that he was offered a number of senior church posts in other north German cities. He was offered the post of Chief Pastor at Schwerin and that of the regional superintendent for Schleswig. He rejected all these offers because he wished to remain in Lübeck. Despite the persistence of post-war economic austerity across western Europe, he was well paid in his existing posts, and loved by the city community.

== Family ==
Jacob Stolterfoht was married three times. On 2 October 1626 he married Dorothea Kirchmann, daughter of the Lübeck polymath-philologist Johann Kirchmann. She died on 18 June 1637, by which time the marriage had yielded seven recorded children. Three further recorded children resulted from Stolterfoht's second marriage, which took place on 25 June 1638 and was to Anna Hackhusen. His third marriage, on 3 August 1664, was to Gertrud Steinmann who the following year also predeceased him. Jacob Stolterfoht is known to have died in Lübeck on 4 March 1668. His portrait, by Matthias Black, bore his epitaph and survived in the Marienkirche till 1942.

Matthäus Stolterfoht, a son of Jacob Stolterfoht, became secretary to the powerful Bergenfahrer association of Lübeck merchants. Another son, Jacob (1633–1696), became a leading pharmacist in the city and was himself the father of the physician Johann Jacob Stolterfoht (1665–1718).
