= Jacob Bording =

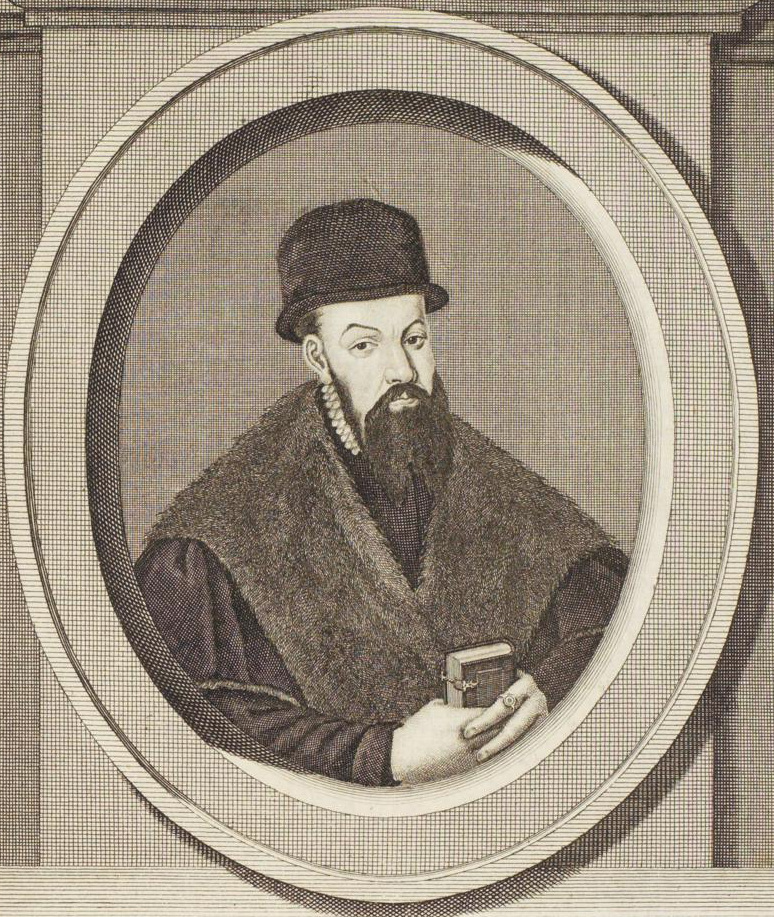
Jakob Nikolaus Bording (1511-1560) J.M.B. Lips. fecit, ca. 1541

Jacob Bording (15 July 1511 – 5 September 1560) was a Flemish medical doctor and personal physician.

== Life ==
Jacob (Nikolaus) Bording was the son of the Antwerp merchant Nikolaus Bording (1449–1520). His mother, born Adriane d’Adriani, was a daughter of an influential family from Utrecht. Her uncle, Adriaen Floriszoon Boeiens, later became (briefly) Pope Hadrian VI, the first and till now last pope from what subsequently became known as The Netherlands. After concluding his schooling in Antwerp he moved on to study classical languages at Leuven/Louvain.

In 1530 Bording moved on to Paris where he studied Aristotelian philosophy and medicine with the anatomist Jacques Dubois (1478–1555). After that he pursued his medical studies further at the University of Montpellier. While there he made the acquaintance of Jacopo Sadoleto, at this time the Bishop of Carpentras. Evidently the bishop was impressed. Through the bishop's mediation in 1537, Bording obtained a teaching post and relocated to Carpentras, a short distance to the east, becoming rector of the school, still aged only 26.

In 1538 he married. His bride, Franzisca Negroni (1523–1582), was the daughter of a Genoese aristocrat. Soon after that he travelled to Antwerp for a family visit. On returning south, in 1540 Bording moved on to the University of Bologna, where he received his doctorate in medicine the same year. That concluded his formal education, and he embarked on a career in teaching. By 1541, however, he had read and been convinced by the writings of Philip Melanchthon, an intellectual heavyweight of the Lutheran reformation. As an adherent of the "new doctrines" he could no longer remain in France without putting his life in danger. He returned with his medical qualification to Antwerp where for the next five years was able to combine work as a physician with lecturing on anatomy and surgery.

From the point of view of the young emperor, the growth of a popular alternative to the mainstream church represented a growing threat, and he became more stalwart in his defence of the true religion. In Antwerp Protestants were discouraged and persecuted, and Bording found it necessary to move on. By 1546 he had reached Hamburg where he settled for a few years, supporting himself as a city physician. Then, in 1549, he received an invitation from Henry V, Duke of Mecklenburg to accept a full professorship in medicine at Rostock. The professorship was to be combined with a post as personal physician to the duke. He relocated in 1550 and remained in Mecklenburg for seven years. In 1553 he had the chance to visit Wittenburg and meet up with Philip Melanchthon, by whose theological work his life had already been so much affected.

In 1557 he moved again, this time to Copenhagen in response to an offer received in April of that year, not dissimilar to the one he had received slightly less than a decade earlier from the Duke of Mecklenburg (who by this time had died). In Copenhagen Bording became personal physician to King Christian III. He was also appointed to a professorship in medicine at the university. A couple of years later, Bording served as university rector during 1559–1560. He was still the rector in September 1560 when his life came to its end. In 1558, as a mark of sincere appreciation, the king had given him a house at Hvidøre on the north side of Copenhagen. Bording's widow settled with the children back in Rostock, however.

== Family ==
Jacob Bording and his wife had nine recorded children. Jakob Bording the younger (1547–1616) became Chancellor of Mecklenburg and mayor of Lübeck. His daughter Johanna (1544–1584) married the theologian and composer, Lucas Bacmeister (1530–1608).
