= Barbara Stolterfoht =

German politician (1940-2021)

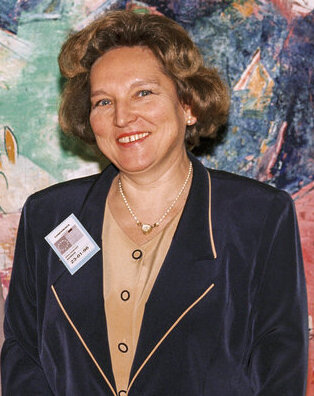
- Born: March 16, 1940; Duchcov, Germany
- Died: February 20, 2021 (aged 80); Berlin, Germany
- Occupation: Politician
- Office: Hessian State Minister for Women, Labour and Social Affairs
- Political party: SPD

Barbara Stolterfoht, née Steger (born 16 March 1940; died 20 February 2021), was a German politician (SPD) and Hessian State Minister for Women, Labour and Social Affairs from 1995 to 1999.

== Career ==
Born in Dux, Reichsgau Sudetenland, Stolterfoht, grew up in Bielefeld and initially trained as an educator. She then completed her Abitur in 1963 on the second educational path. She studied economics, social sciences and political science in Göttingen and Paris, from 1965 in Berlin.

Stolterfoht later worked as a graduate political scientist at the German Institute of Urban Affairs and as deputy managing director at the Science Centre in Berlin, then as head of department at the Federal Centre for Health Education in Cologne and finally at the Federal Executive Committee of the SPD as health officer. In 1984, she became the first municipal Women's Representative in Kassel (until 1985). From 1985 to 1991, she was a full-time city councillor for women, health, social affairs and hospitals in Kassel.

From 1992 to 1995, she was state director of the State Welfare Association in Kassel. In April 1995, Hans Eichel appointed her Hessian State Minister for Women, Labour and Social Affairs. After the change of government in 1999, she was a member of the state parliament for the SPD (from February 1999) and deputy leader of the parliamentary group. She did not stand for re-election in the 2003 state elections.

From 2000 to 2008, she was Chairwoman of the German Parity Welfare Association (DPWV). In 2003/2004, she was also a member of the government commission to ensure sustainability in the financing of the social security systems (so-called Rürup Commission). In December 2004, she was re-elected for a four-year term. In addition, she was elected President of the Federal Association of Non-statutory Welfare (BAGFW) for two years with effect from 1 January 2005. Later, she was honorary chairwoman of the advisory board of Transparency International.

In 2005, she was honoured with the Federal Cross of Merit on ribbon. In 2012, she received the Wilhelm Leuschner Medal of the State of Hesse.

In 2020, she criticised tendencies to marginalise older people in the wake of the Corona crisis. She died in February 2021 in Berlin at the age of 80.
