= Karl Friedrich Stellbrink =

German Lutheran pastor

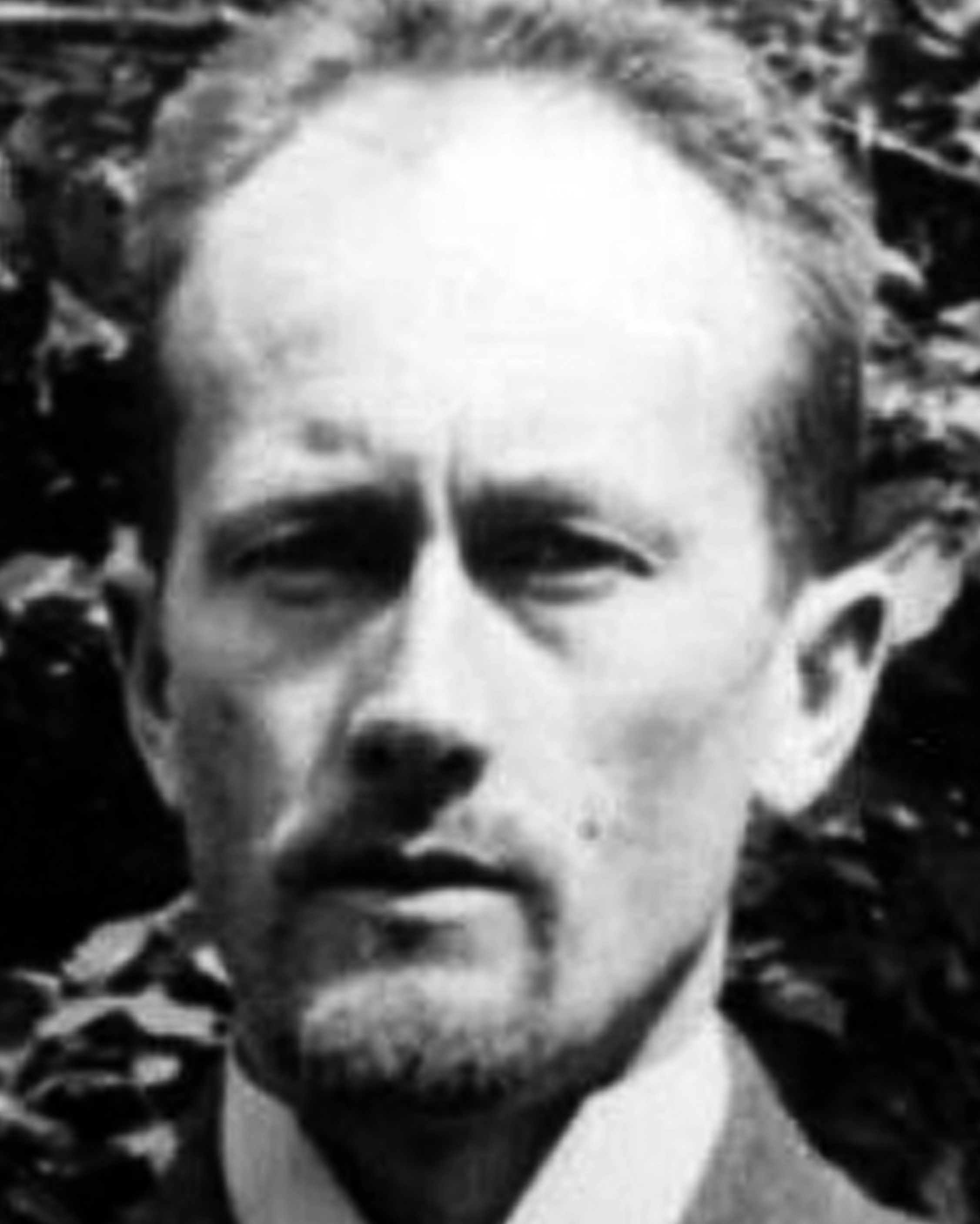
Karl Friedrich Stellbrink

Karl Friedrich Stellbrink (28 October 1894 – 10 November 1943) was a German Lutheran pastor, and one of the Lübeck martyrs, guillotined for opposing the Nazi regime of Adolf Hitler.

== Biography ==
Born in Münster, Germany in 1894, son of a customs official, Karl Friedrich Stellbrink served in the First World War until he was medically discharged in 1917 with a crippling wound to his hand. After completing his Lutheran theology studies, he was ordained in 1921 to the Evangelical Church of Prussia's older Provinces. He resided in Brazil from 1921 to 1929, where he served as a foreign vicar. In 1934, he was appointed as a pastor of the Lutheran Church in Lübeck, Germany. He initially identified with the National Socialist movement but was not involved with the Confessing Church, which arose to resist Hitler's efforts to subjugate German Protestantism under a unified Reich Church. However, the Nazi kirchenkampf campaign against the Churches altered his conviction, and he was expelled from the Nazi party in 1936. Later he was interrogated several times by the Gestapo "for helping persecuted Jews".

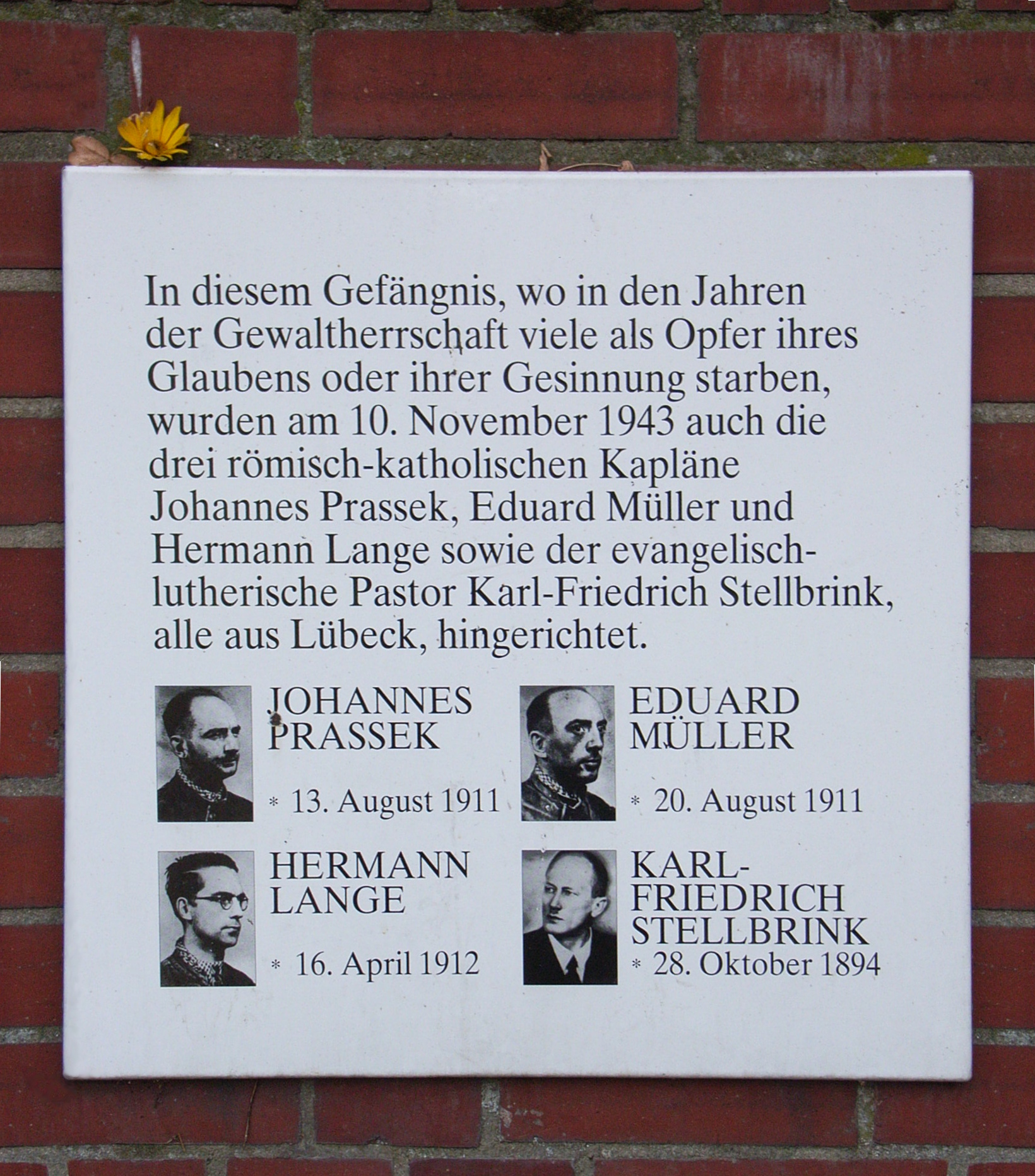
Memorial of four Lübeck martyrs in Hamburg

In 1941, while serving as a pastor in Lübeck, he met Johannes Prassek, a Catholic priest from the nearby Sacred Heart Catholic Church (de). They shared their disapproval of the Nazi regime, and Prassek introduced Stellbrink to his Catholic colleagues, Frs Hermann Lange and Eduard Mueller. The four priests spoke publicly against the Nazis – initially discreetly – distributing pamphlets to friends and congregants. They copied and distributed the anti-Nazi sermons of the Catholic Bishop Clemens August von Galen of Münster. Then, following the RAF air raid on the city, after which Stellbrink tended wounded, he delivered a Palm Sunday sermon which attributed the bombing to divine punishment. Stellbrink was arrested, followed by the three Catholic priests. He was sentenced to death by the People’s Court on 23 June 1943, and executed in Hamburg on 10 November 1943, along with the three Catholics. The mingling of the blood of the four guillotined martyrs has become a symbol of German Ecumenism. After his death, Stellbrink's widow was billed for his court costs, imprisonment, and execution.

Fifty years would pass before the North Elbian Evangelical Lutheran Church, successor of the Lübeck Lutheran church body, would initiate court proceedings to clear Stellbrink's name and admit their shame at how this noble martyr had been treated. In November 1993, the German courts officially overturned the guilty verdict against him. He was honoured by inclusion in the Lutheran Calendar of Saints on his day of death, 10 November.

== See also ==
- Lübeck martyrs
- Kirchenkampf
