= Jakob Bording =

German politician and professor (1547–1616)

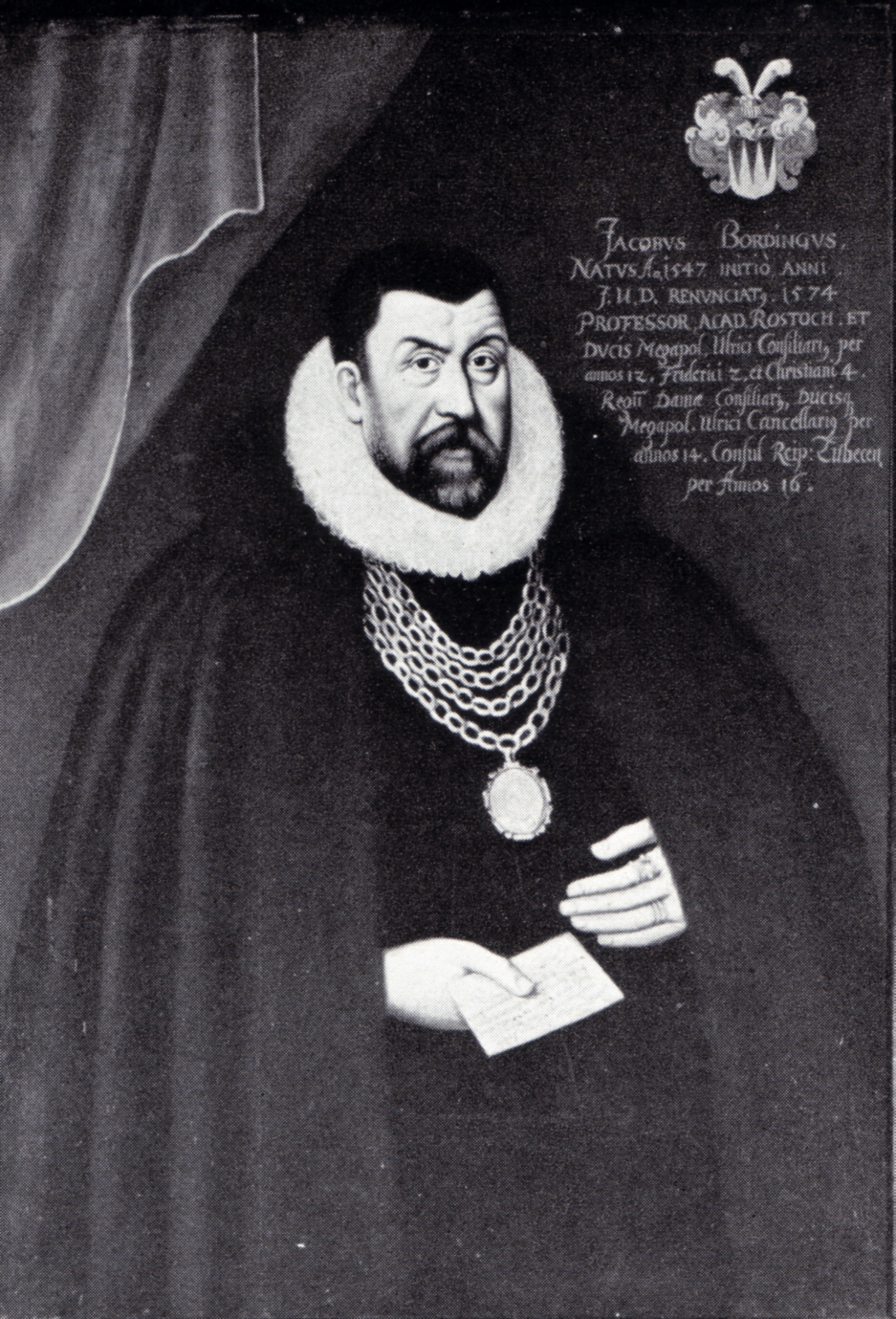
Jakob Bording (1547–1616) Bürgermeistergalerie, Lübeck town hall

Jakob Bording the younger (27 January 1547 – 21 February 1616) was professor for feudal law at the University of Rostock, chancellor for the Duke of Mecklenburg, advisor to the King of Denmark and, during the final part of his life, Mayor of Lübeck.

== Life ==
Bording was one of the nine recorded children of the Flemish physician Jacob Bording (1511-1560) and his Genoese-born wife, born Franzisca Negroni (1523–1582). At the time of his birth his father was living and working in Hamburg but in 1549 the family moved to Rostock in connection with his father's work. His father became a professor at the University of Rostock and then rector at the University of Copenhagen and personal physician to the king of Denmark.

The younger Jakob Bording embarked on the study of jurisprudence at Rostock in 1561. He continued his studies at Paris, Heidelberg and Louvain, then ending up at Leipzig from where he emerged in 1574 as an extraordinary professor of feudal law, with an appropriate Licentiate (degree). At the same time he was working as an advisor to John Albert I and Ulrich, Dukes of Mecklenburg-Güstrow. In 1682 he received his doctorate of law from the University of Rostock. By this time he was in great favour with Ulrich of Mecklenburg, whom in 1582 he accompanied to the Imperial Diet, held, on this occasion, at Augsburg. The emperor created him a Count palatine.

Later he also served as a councillor to Duke Ulrich's son in law, King Frederick III of Denmark, and then to Frederick's successor, King Christian IV of Denmark. In 1686 he achieved a significant promotion when he became Chancellor of Mecklenburg-Güstrow. After he resigned from that post and from his other jobs in Mecklenburg he moved to Lübeck where he became a city councillor and, in 1600, was elected mayor. It is a reflection both of his own qualities and contacts and of the role of Lübeck as an important power in the region that during his sixteen years as mayor Bording undertook a number of significant international visits, notably to Denmark in 1604 (twice) and 1610. The office of mayor was an unpaid one, but Lübeck councillors expressed their own appreciation of Bording's contribution to the city's interests by granting him full use (ususfructus) of the Gut Strecknitz estate as a life-time benefice.

Jakob Bording is commended by one source for his sense of fairness, his direct dealing, and for his sheer ability as a teacher, lawyer and statesman. His funeral oration was written by the distinguished academic and rector of the Katharineum, Johann Kirchmann.
