= Johannes Prassek =

German Catholic priest and Lübeck martyr

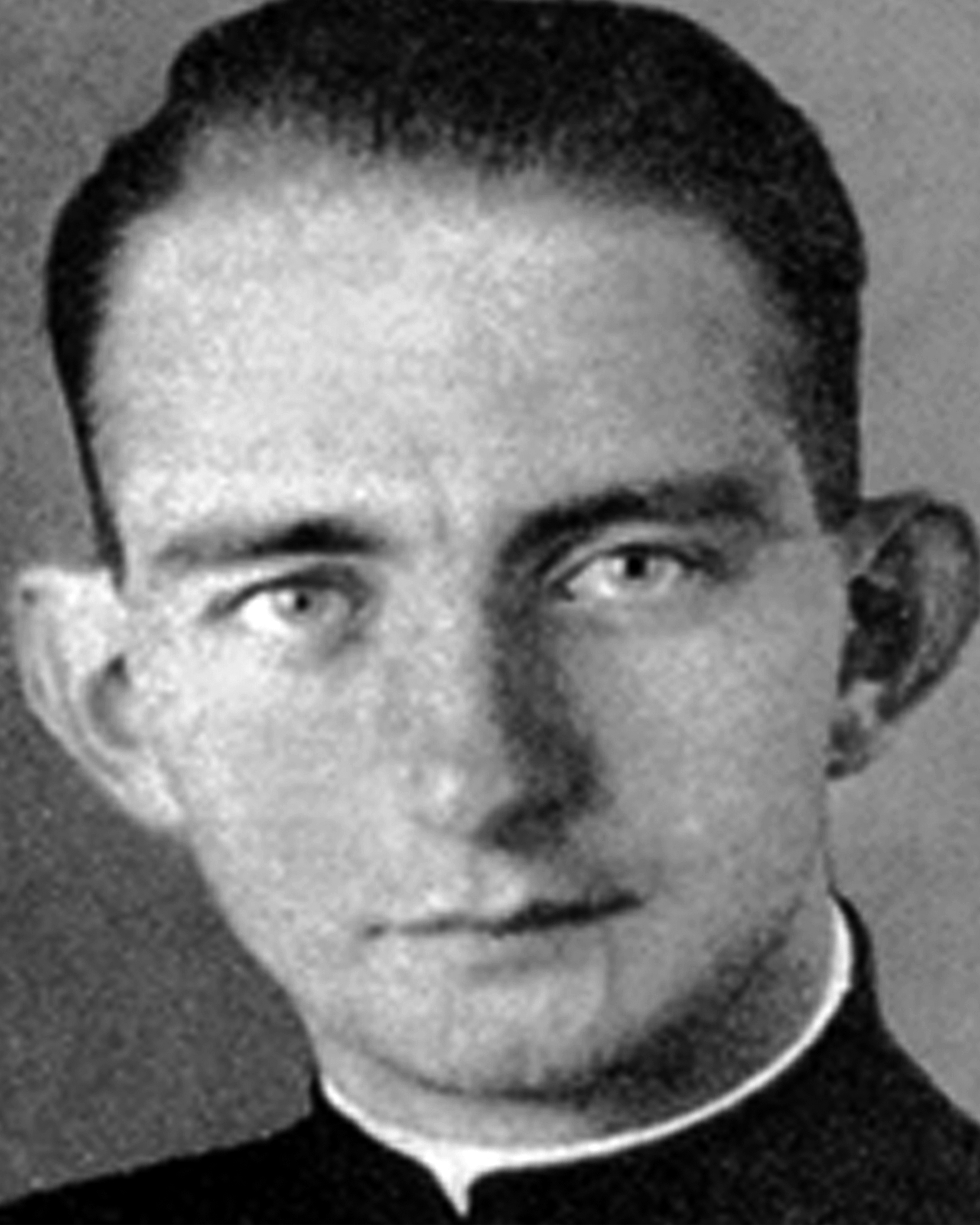
Johannes Prassek

Johannes Prassek (13 August 1911 – 10 November 1943) was a German Catholic priest, and one of the Lübeck martyrs, guillotined for opposing the Nazi regime of Adolf Hitler in 1943. Prassek was beatified by Pope Benedict XVI in 2011.

== Biography ==
Born in Barmbek, Prassek came from a working class Hamburg family, and financially struggled through his studies in theology. Ordained a priest at Osnabrück in 1937, he became a chaplain at Lübeck in 1939. A popular pastor, Prassek, impressed his congregation with his sermons, and work with young people. Adolf Hitler's Nazi regime was governing Germany, and in his theological discussion groups, Prassek often openly spoke of irreconcilable contradictions between Catholicism and Nazi ideology. He also established contact with forced labourers, and learned the Polish language in order to assist in his ministry work with them.

Aged 30, in 1941, Prassek met Karl Friedrich Stellbrink, a pastor at the nearby Lutheran Church. They shared disapproval of the Nazi regime, and Prassek introduced Stellbrink to his Catholic colleagues, Hermann Lange and Eduard Mueller. The four priests spoke publicly against the Nazis – initially discreetly – distributing pamphlets to friends and congregants. They copied and distributed the anti-Nazi sermons of Bishop Clemens August von Galen of Münster. Then, following the 28 March 1942 RAF air raid, after which Stellbrink tended wounded, he delivered a Palm Sunday sermon which attributed the bombing to divine punishment. Stellbrink was arrested, followed by the three Catholic priests. Prassek had been denounced by a Gestapo informer. Arrested in May 1942, he was sentenced to death by the People's Court in June 1943, in the "Lübeck Christians’ Trial", and executed on 10 November 1943 in Hamburg, alongside the other priests. Resigned to martyrdom, Prassek wrote to his family: "Who can oppress one who dies". The mingling of the blood of the four guillotined martyrs has become a symbol of German Ecumenism.

Prassek is remembered in his home city of Hamburg by having a park named after him.

== See also ==
- Kirchenkampf
- Catholic Church and Nazi Germany
