= Hermann Lange =

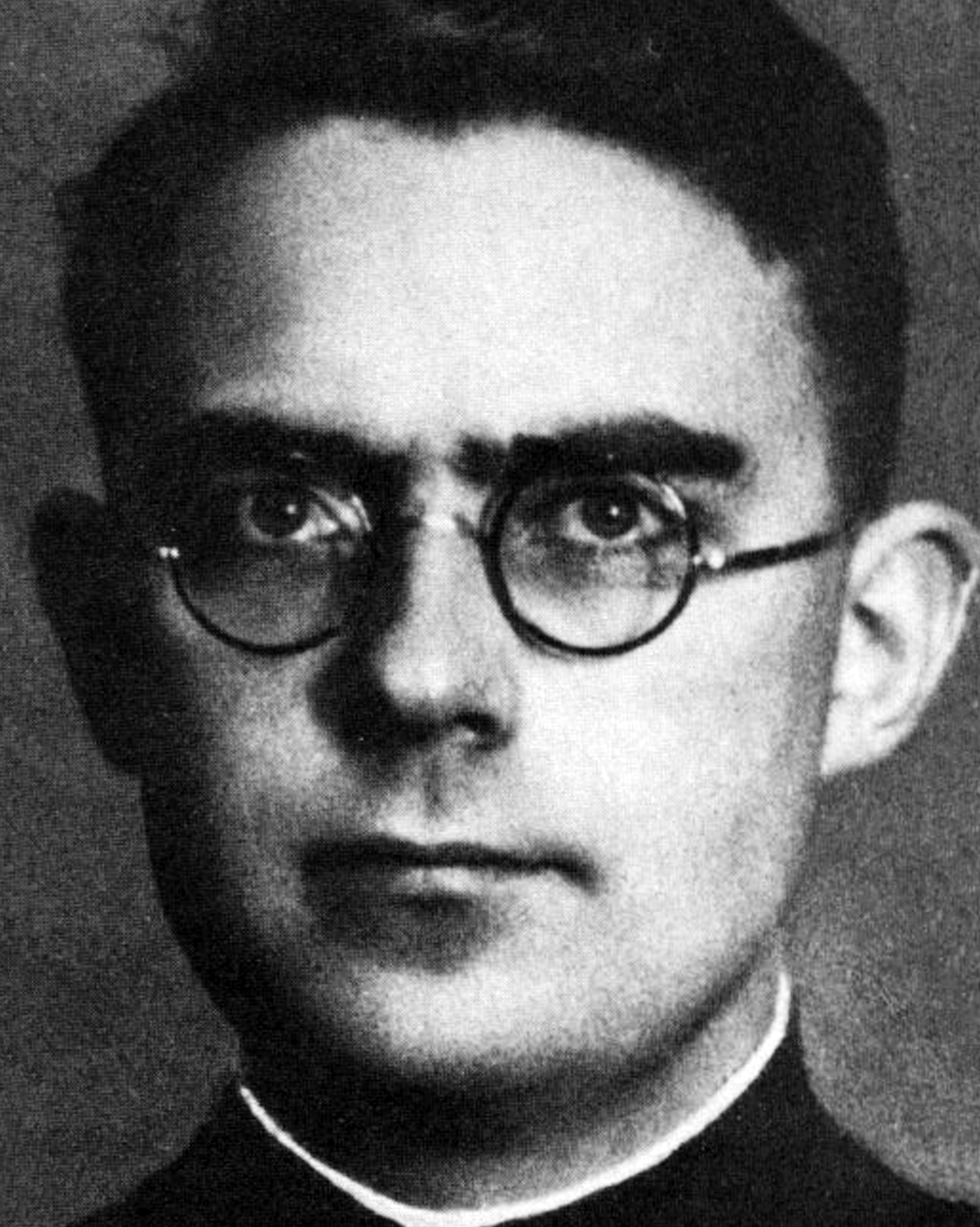
Hermann Lange

Hermann Lange (16 April 1912 – 10 November 1943) was a Roman Catholic priest and martyr of the Nazi period in Germany. He was guillotined in a Hamburg prison by the Nazi authorities in November 1943, along with the three other Lübeck martyrs. Lange was beatified by Pope Benedict XVI in 2011.

Lange along with two Catholic priest colleagues – Johannes Prassek and Eduard Müller – along with Lutheran Pastor Karl Friedrich Stellbrink, spoke publicly against the Nazis – initially discreetly – distributing pamphlets to friends and congregants. They copied and distributed the anti-Nazi sermons of Bishop Clemens August von Galen of Münster. Then, following a March 28, 1942 RAF air raid, after which Stellbrink tended wounded, he delivered a Palm Sunday sermon which attributed the bombing to divine punishment. Stellbrink was arrested, followed by the three Catholic priests, and each were sentenced to death. The mingling of the blood of the four guillotined martyrs has become a symbol of German Ecumenism.

== See also ==
- Lübeck martyrs
- Kirchenkampf
- Catholic Church and Nazi Germany
