= Eduard Müller (martyr) =

German Catholic priest and Lübeck martyr (1911–1943)

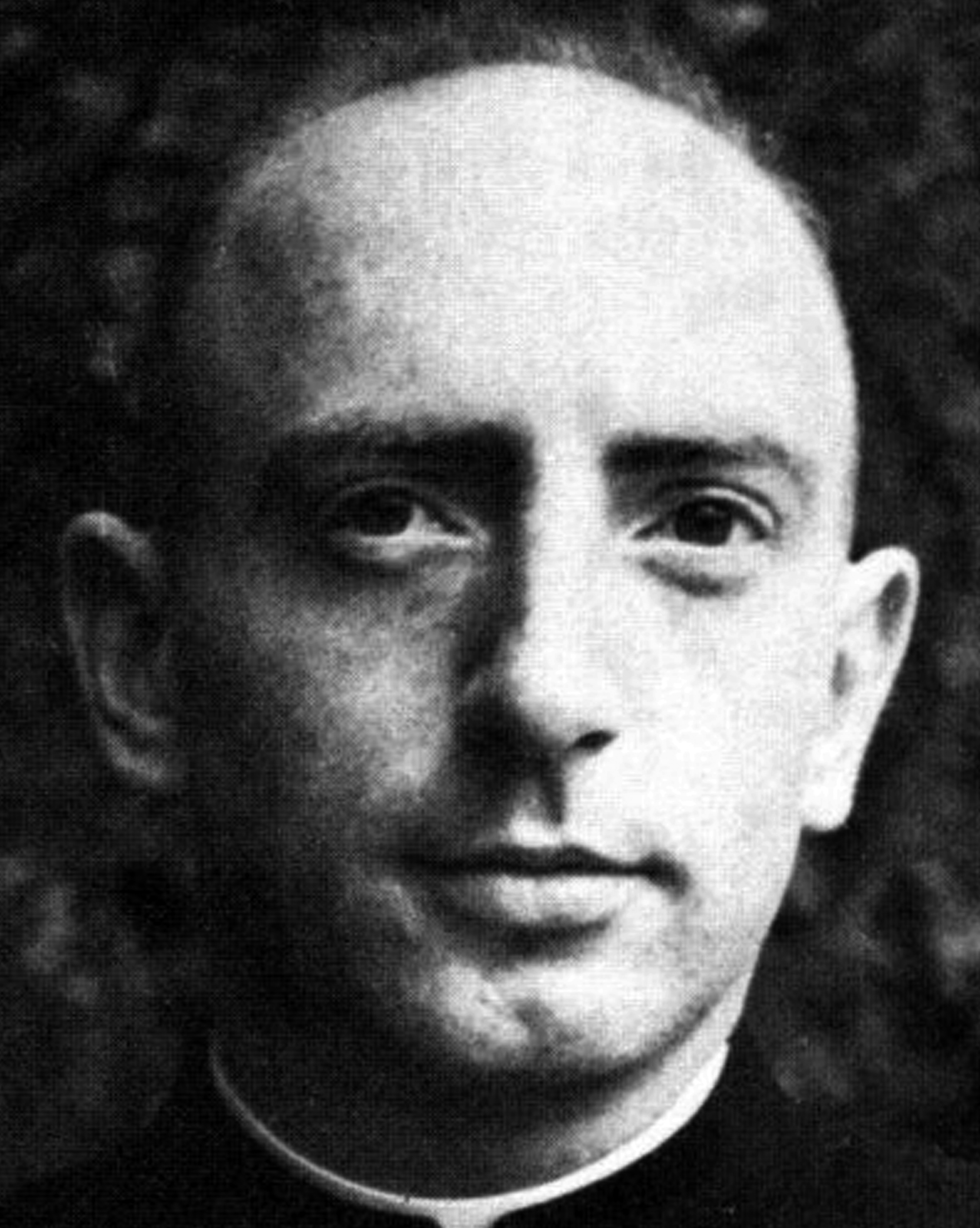
- Eduard Müller
- Born: August 20, 1911; Neumünster, Germany
- Died: November 10, 1943 (aged 32); Hamburg, Germany
- Cause of death: Guillotined by Nazis

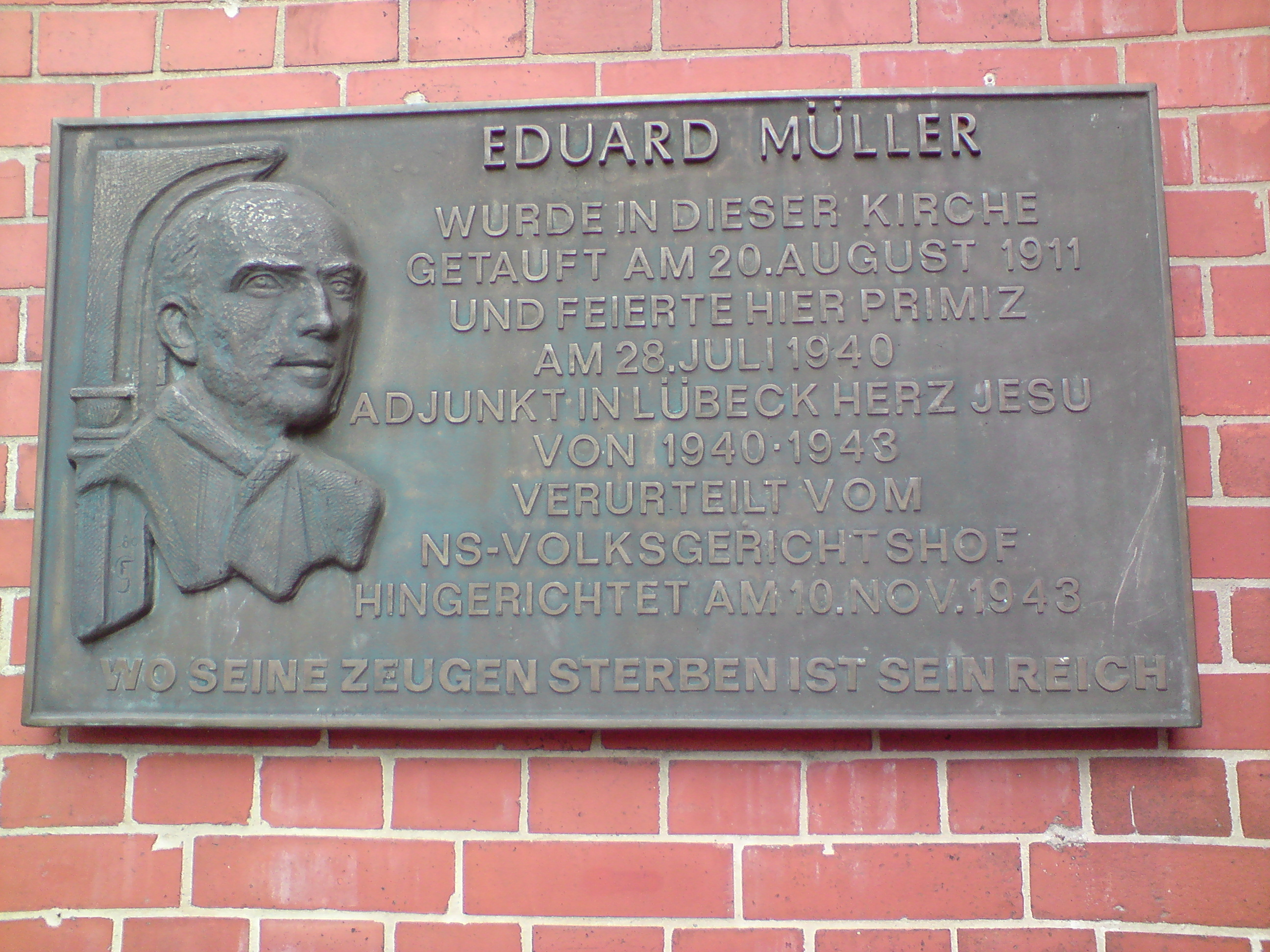
Memorial to Eduard Müller

Eduard Müller (20 August 1911 – 10 November 1943) was a German Catholic priest and martyr. He was guillotined in a Hamburg prison by the Nazi authorities in November 1943, along with the three other Lübeck martyrs. Müller was beatified by Pope Benedict XVI in 2011.

== Life ==
Born in Neumünster, his family were shoemakers. Müller grew up in poverty. After leaving school, he learned the trade of joiner and became a member of the Catholic youth movement. Members of Neumünster Parish assisted him to attend high school and study theology and he was ordained in Osnabrück in 1939, and appointed as a minister for young people at the Church of the Sacred Heart of Jesus in Lübeck. The Nazis had banned Church federation work with young people, but Müller took care of youth groups and led a discussion circle whose topics included National Socialism, political events and the military situation. Müller used information from British radio in his discussion and provided leaflets including copies of the sermons of Bishop Clemens August von Galen, which he duplicated with the prelate Hermann Lange and chaplain Johannes Prassek.

Müller, along with Prassek and Lange and the Lutheran pastor Karl Friedrich Stellbrink, spoke publicly against the Nazis – initially discreetly – distributing pamphlets to friends and congregants. Then, following a 28 March 1942 RAF air-raid, after which Stellbrink tended wounded, he delivered a Palm Sunday sermon which attributed the bombing to divine punishment. Stellbrink was arrested, followed by the three Catholic priests, each of whom were sentenced to death. The mingling of the blood of the four guillotined martyrs has become a symbol of German Ecumenism.

== See also ==
- Lübeck martyrs
- Kirchenkampf
- Catholic Church and Nazi Germany
